= 18 Field Ambulance =

18 (Thunder Bay) Field Ambulance
- Active: 1906 - present
- Country: Canada
- Branch: Royal Canadian Medical Service Primary Reserve
- Type: Field ambulance
- Role: Medical service
- Garrison/HQ: Thunder Bay, Ontario
- Engagements: Second World War

18 Field Ambulance is one of the 16 Royal Canadian Medical Service (RCMS) reserve medical units. Situated in Thunder Bay, Ontario.

== History ==
The 18 Field Ambulance was formed in 1921 in Winnipeg. Originally it was designated 4 Field Ambulance in order to perpetuate the First World War service of 4 Canadian Field Ambulance, Canadian Expeditionary Force. Its war-time predecessor had been formed in Winnipeg on 7 November 1914 and served in France and Flanders 1915–1919 as part of the 2nd Canadian Division. During the Second World War, 4 Field Ambulance formed another active service unit, which served first in Italy and later in France and Belgium.

Timeline:

- 1921: Formation authorized at Winnipeg, Manitoba
- 1923: Relocated to Port Arthur, Ontario, upon full organization
- 1937: Relocated to Fort William and lodged at the Simpson Street Armoury (Fort William is now a part of the city Thunder Bay), Ontario
- 15 December 1939: Left Fort William for Halifax
- 19 December 1939: Sailed to Glasgow, Scotland, to be stationed at Camp Aldershot
- 6 June 1940: Finished training at Aldershot
- 13 June 1940: Landed in France
- 15 June 1940: Left France after collapse of French forces
- August 1942: Moved to Brighton to help Dieppe casualties
- 27 June 1943: Sailed to Sicily
- 10 July 1943: Landed in Sicily as part of the Allied invasion of Sicily
- 6 August 1943: Prepared for the invasion of Italy
- 7 September 1943: Landed in Italy
- 1 March 1945: Reached banks of Senio River
- 9 March 1945: Sailed for Belgium
- 18 April 1945: Occupied Apeldoorn, the Netherlands
- 8 May 1945: Left the Netherlands after German surrender
- 2 September 1945: Returned home to Fort William Armouries
- 1954: Reorganized as 17 Medical Company
- 1965: Unit becomes a sub-unit of the Lake Superior Service Battalion
- 1970: Lake Superior Service Battalion disbanded, Medical Section transferred to 138 Company RCASC (Thunder Bay)
- 1975: Reorganized as an independent unit designated 18 Medical Company
- 1980: Command passed to Lieutenant-Colonel JL Remus (Thunder Bay)
- 1985: Command passed to Lieutenant-Colonel EC Diem (Thunder Bay)
- 1991: Command passed to Major G Perales (Thunder Bay)
- 1994: Command passed to Lt(N) ID Sweet (Thunder Bay)
- 1995: Command passed to Major DP Gresko (Thunder Bay)
- 2004: Re-organized as 18 Field Ambulance
- 2006: Command passed to Major M Thibert (Thunder Bay)
- 2015: Command passed to Major DP Gresko (Thunder Bay)

== World War I ==
Assigned as Medical unit for 6th Canadian Infantry Brigade and provided their medical needs at the following battles: The Somme, Amiens, Vimy Ridge, Fosse, Passchendaele, and Arras.

== World War II ==
During World War II, 18 Field Ambulance was assigned as Medical unit for the 1st Infantry Brigade (Royal Canadian Regiment, Hastings and Prince Edward Regiment, 48th Highlanders) and provided their medical needs at the following battles.

=== Italy, 1943-1945 ===
- Allied invasion of Sicily
- Valguarnera Caropepe
- Grammichele
- Assoro
- Agira
- Adrano
- Regalbuto
- Landing at Reggio Calabria

Medical staff, who were involved early in the planning of the invasion of Italy, developed a plan to evacuate casualties back to the landing beaches where additional clearing stations and field surgical units, as well as special beach medical sections would be located. These would be available for the care of the casualties until they could be evacuated by landing craft to Sicily itself or to nearby hospital ships. The units which would put this plan into effect included a field ambulance accompanying each brigade, two field surgical units, a field dressing station and a field transfusion unit. Their role was to set up an advanced surgical center near the advanced dressing station in Reggio. All of the remaining divisional medical resources were to have crossed to Italy by D-Day +7. In addition, plans were made for landing strips to be made available and prioritization of those casualties who might require air transport.

Malaria treatment and prophylaxis was a high priority and many proposals were put forth to reduce the incidence rate. One such proposal was to withdraw the issue of short pants from the troops as they tended to leave these on after dark when mosquitoes became active. 4 Field Ambulance was given the task of caring for the wounded being ferried to Sicily on landing craft. This tasking was in addition to the normal duties of providing medical care.

The Canadians landed on 3 September 1943 with negligible opposition and secured their objectives by the end of the day. The first casualty to be treated by 4 Field Ambulance in Italy was on 7 September when the unit was set up in Delianuova along with No. 1 Field Surgical Unit and No. 1 Field Transfusion Unit. On 8 September the surrender of Italy was announced. At this time the Canadian axis of advance was moving mainly to the east coast road and soon Locri was in 3rd Brigade hands. By the 13th the Unit moved into Marina di Catanzaro and were joined by their rear-party with additional vehicles and equipment. This brought them up to war establishment for the first time since the original landing.

- Motta Montecorvino
- Campobasso
- Torella del Sannio
- Moro River
- San Leonardo, Italy
- The Gully
- Ortona - San Nicola and San Tommaso (villages in Ortona)
- Naviglio Canal
- Fosso Vecchio
- Cassino II
- Gustav Line
- Liri Valley
- Hitler Line
- Gothic Line
- Lamone Crossing
- Misano Ridge
- Rimini Line
- San Fortunato
- Bulgaria Village
- San Martino – San Lorenzo
- Pisciatello

=== North-West Europe, 1945 ===
- Apeldoorn

== Notable members ==
- Colonel Robert Angus Keane DSO OBE ED CD. First enlisted with 4 Field Ambulance as a private in 1930 at age 15. Later Commissioned as a Lieutenant in The Lake Superior Regiment and would Command The Lake Superior Regiment (Motor) during the Second World War. Would later Command the newly raised 2nd Battalion, The Royal Canadian Regiment during the Korean War and serve in various senior roles until retiring from the Canadian Army in 1965.
