= 119th =

119th is the ordinal form of the number 119. 119th or One hundred and [spell out] may also refer to:

- A fraction, 1/119, equal to one of 119 equal parts

== Geography ==
- 119th meridian east, a line of longitude
- 119th meridian west, a line of longitude

== Military ==
- 119th Brigade (disambiguation)
- 119th Division (disambiguation)
- 119th Regiment (disambiguation)

== See also ==
- April 29, 119th day of the year in a standard year
