= Northern Pioneers =

The Northern Pioneers
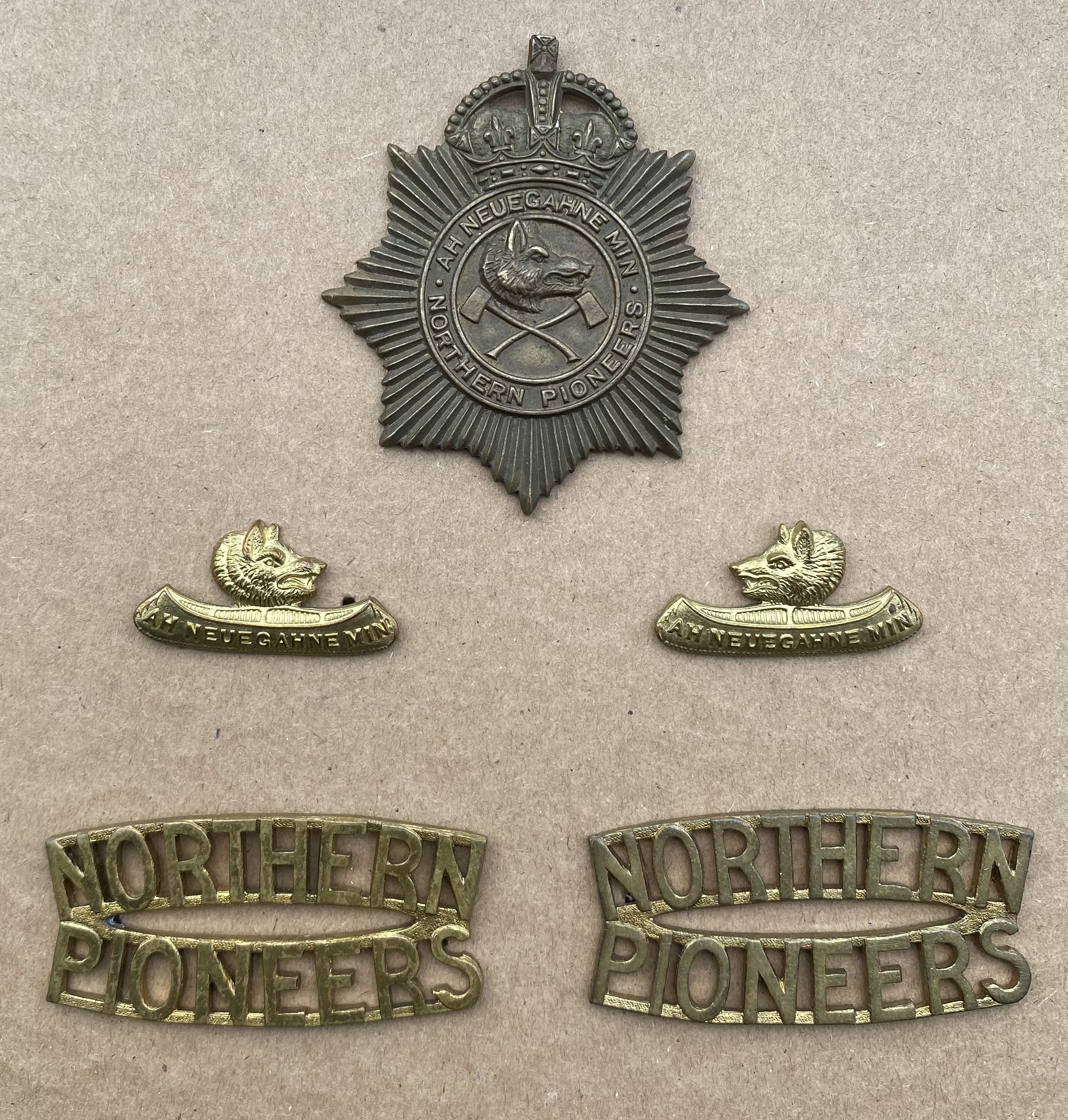
- Northern Pioneers insignia 1920s
- Active: 1903–1936
- Country: Canada
- Branch: Canadian Militia
- Role: Infantry
- Part of: Non-Permanent Active Militia
- Garrison/HQ: Parry Sound, Ontario
- Motto: Ah neuegahne min ('We go in front')
- Engagements: First World War
- Battle honours: See #Battle honours

The Northern Pioneers was an infantry regiment of the Non-Permanent Active Militia of the Canadian Militia (now the Canadian Army). In 1936, the regiment was amalgamated with the Algonquin Regiment.

== Lineage ==
- Originated on 1 September 1903, in Parry Sound, Ontario, as the 23rd Regiment, The Northern Fusiliers.
- Redesignated on 1 January 1904, as the 23rd Regiment "The Northern Pioneers".
- Redesignated on 1 May 1920, as The Northern Pioneers.
- Amalgamated on 15 December 1936, with The Algonquin Regiment.

== Perpetuations ==
- 122nd (Muskoka) Battalion, CEF
- 162nd (Parry Sound) Battalion, CEF

== Organization ==
=== 23rd Regiment, The Northern Fusiliers (01 September, 1903) ===
- Regimental Headquarters (Parry Sound, Ontario)
- No. 1 Company (Parry Sound, Ontario)
- No. 2 Company (Kearney, Ontario)
- No. 3 Company (Sundridge, Ontario; later moved on 1 May 1911 to Bracebridge, Ontario)
- No. 4 Company (Powassan, Ontario) (later redesignated on 2 May 1904 as No. 6 Company)
- No. 5 Company (Callendar, Ontario; later moved on 1 May 1908, to Utterson, Ontario)
- No. 6 Company (Loring, Ontario) (later redesignated on 2 May 1904 as No. 4 Company)
- No. 7 Company (North Bay, Ontario)
- No. 8 Company (North Bay, Ontario; later moved on 1 February 1906, to McKellar, Ontario)

=== The Northern Pioneers (15 February 1921) ===
- 1st Battalion (perpetuating the 162nd Battalion, CEF)
- 2nd (Reserve) Battalion (perpetuating the 122nd Battalion, CEF)

== Battle honours ==
- Arras, 1917
- Hill 70
- Ypres, 1917

== Notable members ==
- Francis Pegahmagabow MM
