= 256th Battalion, CEF =

Battalion of the Canadian Expeditionary Force

The 256th Battalion, CEF was a unit in the Canadian Expeditionary Force during the First World War. Based in Toronto, Ontario, the unit began recruiting in late 1916 in that city. The unit later became the 10th Battalion, Canadian Railway Troops. The battalion received no battle honours and was disbanded on 15 September 1920. The 256th Battalion, CEF had one Officer Commanding: Lieut-Col. W. A. McConnell.

Fred Ogilvie Loft was a part of this battalion.

The battalion is perpetuated by The Algonquin Regiment (Northern Pioneers).
