= Algonquin Regiment (Northern Pioneers) =

The Algonquin Regiment Northern Pioneers
- Algonquin Regiment cap badge
- Active: 1 July 1900–present
- Country: Canada
- Branch: Canadian Army
- Type: Line infantry
- Role: Light role
- Size: Two companies
- Part of: 33 Canadian Brigade Group
- Garrison/HQ: Fort Chippewa Barracks, North Bay, Ontario
- Nickname: The Gonqs
- Motto: Ne-kah-ne-tah ('Let us lead')
- March: "We Lead, Others Follow"
- Engagements: First World War; Second World War; War in Afghanistan
- Battle honours: See #Battle honours
- Website: canada.ca/en/army/corporate/4-canadian-division/the-algonquin-regiment.html

Commanders
- Current commander: Lieutenant-Colonel T. East

Insignia
- Abbreviation: ALQ R

The Algonquin Regiment (Northern Pioneers) is a primary reserve infantry regiment of the Canadian Army comprising two companies. "A" Company is in North Bay, Ontario, and "B" Company is in Timmins, Ontario. The regiment falls under the command of the 4th Canadian Division's 33 Canadian Brigade Group.

== Lineage ==
The regimental colour of The Algonquin Regiment.

The camp flag of the Algonquin Regiment.

=== The Algonquin Regiment ===
- Originated 1 July 1900 in Sault Ste. Marie, Ontario as the 97th Regiment of Rifles. Sub-units were in Thessalon, Sudbury and Sturgeon Falls.
- Redesignated 1 June 1903 as the 97th Regiment (Algonquin Rifles).
- Redesignated 1 May 1920 as The Algonquin Rifles.
- Redesignated 15 February 1929 as The Algonquin Regiment.
- 15 December 1936, "B", "C" and "D" Companies amalgamated with The Northern Pioneers, retaining the same regimental designation. At the same time, the "Headquarters"' and "A" Companies were amalgamated with The Sault Ste. Marie Regiment to become The Sault Ste. Marie and Sudbury Regiment (MG) (currently the 49th Field Artillery Regiment, RCA).
- Redesignated 7 November 1940 as the 2nd (Reserve) Battalion, The Algonquin Regiment.
- Redesignated 15 February 1946 as The Algonquin Regiment.
- 1 October 1954 converted to armour and redesignated as The Algonquin Regiment (26th Armoured Regiment).
- Redesignated 19 May 1958 as The Algonquin Regiment (RCAC).
- 19 March 1965, converted to infantry and redesignated The Algonquin Regiment.
- Redesignated on 23 June 2016, as The Algonquin Regiment (Northern Pioneers).

=== The Northern Pioneers ===
- Originated 1 September 1903 in Parry Sound, Ontario as the 23rd Regiment, The Northern Fusiliers.
- Redesignated 1 January 1904 as the 23rd Regiment "The Northern Pioneers".
- Redesignated 1 May 1920 as The Northern Pioneers.
- Amalgamated 15 December 1936 with The Algonquin Regiment.
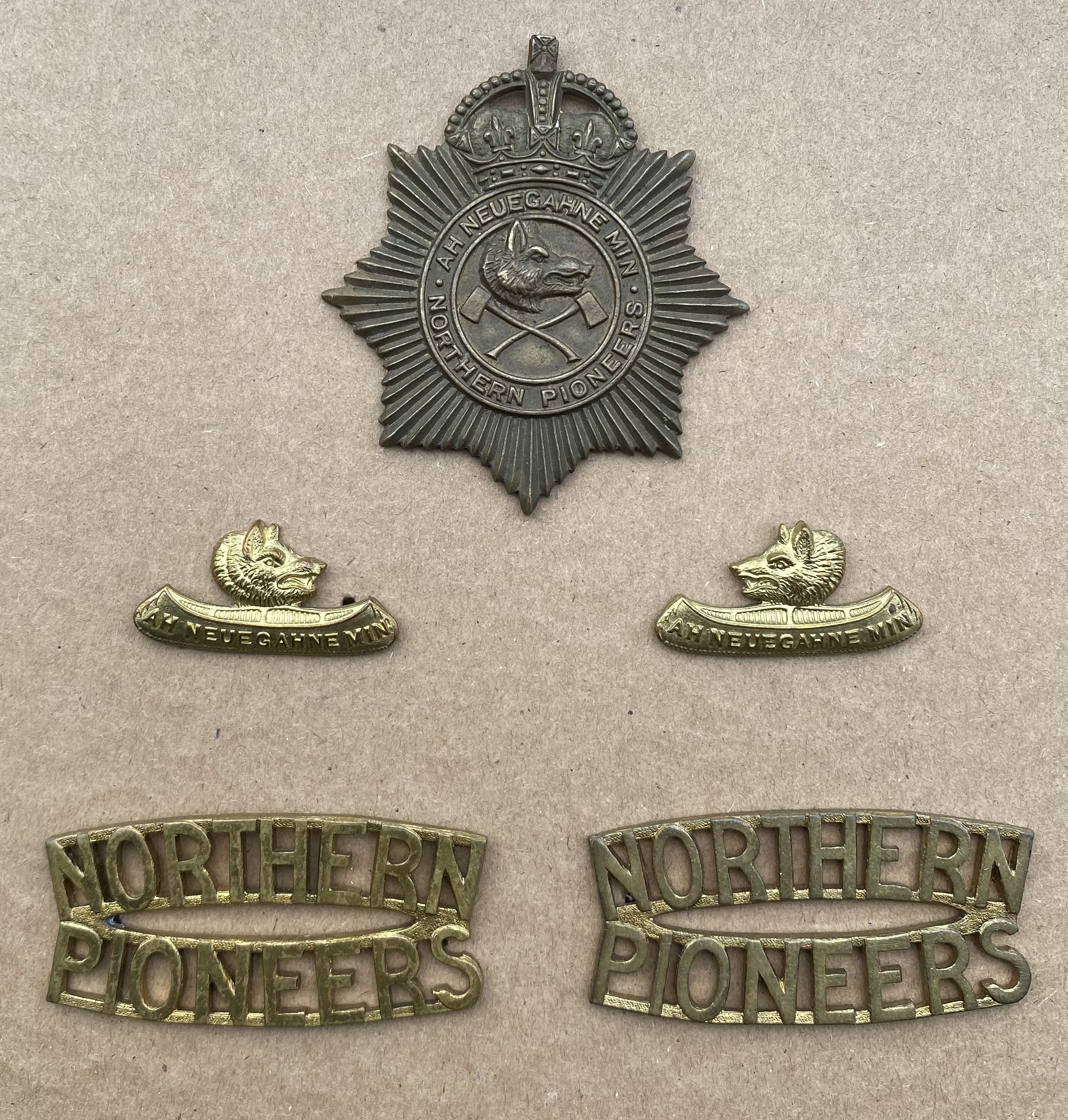
Northern Pioneers insignia 1920's

=== Lineage chart ===
Lineage chart

1865	Volunteer Infy Coy at Sault Ste. Marie
1886	No. 6 Coy, 96th "District of Algoma" Bn of Rifles
1896	Sault Ste. Marie Rifle Coy	Sudbury Rifle Coy
1899	Thessalon Rifle Coy
1900	97th Regt of Rifles
1903	97th Regt "Algonquin Rifles"	23rd Regt "The Northern Fusiliers"
1904	23rd Regt "The Northern Pioneers"
1915	159th "Overseas" Bn, CEF	122nd "Overseas" Bn, CEF
1916	228th "Overseas" Bn, CEF	162nd "Overseas" Bn, CEF
1917	Absorbed by 8th Reserve Bn	6th Bn, CRT	256th "Overseas" Railway Construction Bn, CEF	Absorbed by 3rd and 4th Reserve Bn	Absorbed by Canadian Forestry Depot
1917	10th Bn, CRT
1920	Disbanded	Disbanded
1920	1st Bn (159th Bn, CEF), The Algonquin Rifles	2nd Bn (228th Bn, CEF), (Note: Reserve) The Algonquin Rifles	3rd Bn (256th Bn, CEF), The Algonquin Rifles	1st Bn (162nd Bn, CEF), The Northern Pioneers	2nd Bn (122nd Bn, CEF), The Northern Pioneers
1929	1st Bn (159th Bn, CEF), The Algonquin Regt	2nd Bn (228th Bn, CEF), The Algonquin Regt	3rd Bn (256th Bn, CEF), The Algonquin Regt
1936	Disbanded	Disbanded	Disbanded
1936	The Algonquin Regt (Note: Headquarters and A Company, The Algonquin Regiment, amalgamate with The Sault Ste. Marie and Sudbury Regiment (MG))
1940	The Algonquin Regt, CASF
1940	1st Bn, The Algonquin Regt, CASF	2nd (Reserve) Bn, The Algonquin Regt
1946	Disbanded	The Algonquin Regt
1951	"E" Coy, (Note: Regular Force) The Algonquin Regt	"F" Coy, The Algonquin Regt
1951	Absorbed by 1st Canadian Infy Bn
1952	Absorbed by 2nd Canadian Infy Bn
1954	The Algonquin Regt (26th Armd Regt)
1958	The Algonquin Regt (RCAC)
1965	The Algonquin Regt
2016	The Algonquin Regt (Northern Pioneers)

== Perpetuations ==
=== Great War ===
- 122nd Battalion (Muskoka), CEF
- 159th Battalion (1st Algonquins), CEF
- 162nd Battalion (Parry Sound), CEF
- 228th Battalion (Northern Fusiliers), CEF
- 256th Battalion, CEF

== Operational history ==
=== Great War ===
Details of the 23rd Regiment "The Northern Pioneers" were called out on active service on 6 August 1914 for local protection duties.

The 122nd Battalion (Muskoka), CEF was authorized on 22 December 1915 and embarked for Great Britain on 2 June 1917. There, its personnel were absorbed by the Canadian Forestry Depot, CEF on 10 June 1917 to provide reinforcements. The battalion disbanded on 1 September 1917.

The 159th Battalion (1st Algonquins), CEF was authorized on 22 December 1915 and embarked for Great Britain on 31 October 1916. There, its personnel were absorbed by the 8th Reserve Battalion, CEF on 20 January 1917 to provide reinforcements for the Canadian Corps in the field. The battalion disbanded on 27 July 1917.

The 162nd Battalion (Parry Sound), CEF was authorized on 22 December 1915 and embarked for Great Britain on 31 October 1916. There, its personnel were absorbed by the 3rd Reserve Battalion, CEF and the 4th Reserve Battalion, CEF on 4 January 1917 to provide reinforcements for the Canadian Corps in the field. The battalion disbanded on 15 September 1920.

The 228th Battalion (Northern Fusiliers), CEF was authorized on 15 July 1916 and embarked for Great Britain on 16 February 1917. There, it was redesignated as the 6th Battalion, Canadian Railway Troops, CEF on 8 March 1917. The battalion landed in France on 3 April 1917, where it provided railway construction support on the British sector of the Western Front until the end of the war. The battalion disbanded on 23 October 1920.

The 256th Battalion, CEF was authorized on 1 May 1917 as the 256th "Overseas" Railway Construction Battalion, CEF, and embarked for Great Britain on 28 March 1917. There, it was redesignated as the 10th Battalion, Canadian Railway Troops, CEF on 30 May 1917. It disembarked in France 19 June 1917, where it provided railway construction support on the British sector of the Western Front until the end of the war. The battalion disbanded on 23 October 1920.

=== Second World War ===
The regiment mobilized as The Algonquin Regiment, CASF for active service on 24 May 1940. It was redesignated as the 1st Battalion, The Algonquin Regiment, CASF on 7 November 1940. The battalion initially served in Canada in a home defence role as part of the 20th Infantry Brigade, 7th Canadian Division and in Newfoundland from 7 February 1942 to 6 February 1943. It embarked for Great Britain on 11 June 1943 and landed in France on 25 July 1944, as part of the 10th Infantry Brigade, 4th Canadian Armoured Division, and continued to fight in North-West Europe until the end of the war. The overseas battalion disbanded on 15 February 1946.

=== Post-War: NATO and Korea ===
On 4 May 1951, the regiment mobilized two temporary Active Force companies, designated "E" and "F" Companies. "E" Company was reduced to nil strength when its personnel were absorbed into the 1st Canadian Infantry Battalion (later the 3rd Battalion, The Canadian Guards) for service in Germany with NATO. It disbanded on 29 July 1953. "F" Company was initially used as a reinforcement pool for "E" Company. On 15 May 1952, it was reduced to nil strength when its personnel were absorbed by the newly formed 2nd Canadian Infantry Battalion (later the 4th Battalion, The Canadian Guards) for service in Korea with the United Nations. "F" Company disbanded on 29 July 1953.

=== War In Afghanistan ===
The regiment contributed an aggregate of more than 20% of its authorized strength to the various Task Forces which served in Afghanistan between 2002 and 2014.

== History ==
=== Great War ===
The 97th Regiment (Algonquin Rifles) recruited to its full active strength and supplied 12 officers and 251 other ranks to the 15th Battalion, CEF.

Captain E.F. Armstrong began recruiting in Nipissing and Sudbury in late 1915, resulting in the formation of the 159th (First Algonquins) Battalion. The battalion was mobilized on 5 July 1916, trained at Camp Borden in Angus, Ontario, during that summer and fall of 1916, and embarked for England on 1 November 1916, with a strength of 1,004 men. The battalion remained intact until 20 January 1917, when it was absorbed into the 8th Reserve Battalion and used to reinforce units already in France and Flanders. As a result of not having enough men at any particular battle, the unit received only the general "The Great War, 1916–17" battle honour.

=== 1920s-1930s ===
Following the end of the war the 159th (First Algonquins), 228th (Northern Fusiliers) and 256th (Toronto) were perpetuated in the Algonquin Rifles. In 1929, the unit was renamed The Algonquin Regiment. The regiment decided to keep the bull moose symbol of the 97th Regiment (Algonquin Rifles) on a redesigned cap badge. In 1936, "A" Company in Sudbury was removed from the regiment and amalgamated with The Sault Ste. Marie Regiment to become the Sault Ste. Marie and Sudbury Regiment (MG), and The Northern Pioneers were amalgamated into The Algonquin Regiment.

=== Second World War ===
==== Home Defence ====
When war broke out the Algonquin Regiment was only 250 men strong. Recruitment and training soon became their primary concern. The regiment recruited from an area extending from Bracebridge and Parry Sound to the south and Timmins and Cochrane to the north. It was not until 22 July 1940, that the regiment went into active service. On 4 September 1940, the first battalion loaded up, the Algonquin Regiment (Active Force), and arrived at Camp Borden three days later. There was not enough space, however, for training exercises and they were moved to Current River Camp in Port Arthur, Ontario, and again to Camp Shilo in Manitoba on 4 June 1941. The regiment was transferred to Niagara-on-the-Lake and assigned guard duty on the Niagara River and the Welland Canal in November 1941, before finally being asked for their first draft for overseas enforcements on 14 January 1942. In February 1942, the regiment was transferred to Newfoundland and assigned protection duties at Torbay Airport and Cape Spear. In January 1943, the regiment was chosen for operations overseas, was moved to Debert Camp in Nova Scotia and, for administration purposes, was assigned to the 20th Brigade of the 7th Canadian Infantry Division. The regiment embarked on the RMS Empress of Japan in Halifax on 10 June 1943, and sailed the following day for England with a complement of 4,500 troops. Upon arriving in Liverpool the regiment proceeded to Heathfield and was made part of the 10th Canadian Infantry Brigade of the 4th Canadian (Armoured) Division.

==== North-West Europe ====
On 16 July 1944, an advance party left for Normandy, France, with the regiment as a whole arriving a couple of days later. The morning of 25 July, all four companies of the Algonquin Regiment landed on Juno Beach where, in the following days, learnt of their ensuing mission to support the 4th Canadian (Armoured) Division in closing the Falaise Gap. On 9 August, the regiment, supporting BCR (28th Armoured Regiment (The British Columbia Regiment (Duke of Connaught's Own))), jointly formed 'Worthington Force', which was tasked with taking Hill 195. Taking an unfortunate wrong turn at 02:00, they ended up 4 miles (6.4 km) east of Hill 195, closer to Hill 140, deep in German territory. The regiment suffered heavy losses with total casualties of 128 men and 47 tanks. The leader of the force, BCR commander Lieutenant-Colonel Don Worthington, was killed, and the Algonquins' commander, Lieutenant-Colonel Art Hay, was seriously wounded. Regimental Sergeant Major A. J. Primeau was killed by the same mortar bomb that seriously wounded Hay. Leading up to 31 August, the Algonquin Regiment, moving within the 4th CAD, were tasked with filling the gap to the south at Hill 240, fighting alongside the 1st Polish Armoured Division. The period from 31 August to 8 September was a period of rapid movement into Belgium, halted on the 8th at the Ghent–Brugge Canal. The fighting, all day and suffering multiple setbacks resulting in numerous casualties across all the regiments, ended 10 September with the Allies across the Ghent–Brugge Canal after holding back the German counterattacks. A few days later the attempt of the regiment to cross the Leopold Canal was successfully repelled at Moerkerke by the German 245th Infantry Division. The Canadians pulled back after a tremendous covering artillery barrage. The regiment continued with the 4th Division north out of Belgium into the Netherlands in a progression of battles for the north shore of the Scheldt Estuary eventually leading to the liberation of Welberg and Steenbergen. The operation to liberate Welberg was initiated on 31 October; however, with "D" Company resting, all "A", "B" and "C" Companies fell short of their objectives facing massive German counterattacks. Fighting continued on until November 1 when the regiment retreated back to a few kilometres outside of Welberg. On 2 November they launched their second attack, this time along the right side of the town, and fighting continued throughout the night.

By the end of 3 November all four companies had reached their target objectives and succeeded in the liberation of Welberg. From 5 to 8 November the Algonquin Regiment rested in the Steenbergen area; the period proceeding became known as the "winter war" (November 1944–February 1945). Leading into Operation Blockbuster, this dislodgment of the German hinge in Hochwald on 27 February 1945, fighting to close the Hochwald gap began. By midday of 3 March, the allies had completed their objectives. Over the next couple of months, the Algonquin Regiment continued to fight, as they had been the entire war, under the 4th Division, crossing the Rhine with the last round-up (16 April–4 May) and cease-fire called just past Rastede, Germany. As of January 1946, the Algonquin Regiment's final death toll was 65 officers and 1235 other soldiers.

=== Post war to the present ===
On 23 June 2016, the regiment's name was changed to The Algonquin Regiment (Northern Pioneers).

== Organization ==
=== 97th Regiment of Rifles (1 July 1900) ===
- Regimental Headquarters (Sault Ste. Marie)
- No. 1 Company (Sault Ste. Marie) (formerly No. 6 Company, 96th District of Algoma Battalion of Rifles, first raised on 27 January 1865 as the Volunteer Rifle Company of Sault St. Marie)
- No. 2 Company (Sudbury) (first raised on 24 August 1896, as the Sudbury Rifle Company)
- No. 3 Company (Thessalon) (first raised on 1 July 1899, as the Thessalon Rifle Company)
- No. 4 Company (Sturgeon Falls)

=== 97th Regiment (Algonquin Rifles) (1 April 1908) ===
- Regimental Headquarters (Sudbury)
- A Company (Sault Ste. Marie) (later transferred on 15 November 1913 to form the 51st Regiment (Soo Rifles); new A Company formed on 1 April 1914 at Cobalt)
- B Company (Sudbury)
- C Company (Thessalon)
- D Company (Sturgeon Falls) (later moved on 1 July 1910 to Elk Lake)
- E Company (Massey) (raised on 1 April 1908; moved on 3 July 1910 to Blind River; later moved on 1 April 1914 to Cochrane)
- F Company (Gore Bay) (raised on 1 April 1908; moved on 1 October 1910 to Haileybury)
- G Company (North Bay) (raised on 1 May 1911)
- H Company (New Liskeard) (raised on 1 April 1908 as an independent company; regimented in 1912)

=== The Algonquin Rifles (1 June 1922) ===
- 1st Battalion (perpetuating the 159th Battalion, CEF)
- 2nd (Reserve) Battalion (perpetuating the 228th Battalion, CEF)
- 3rd (Reserve) Battalion (perpetuating the 256th Battalion, CEF)

=== The Algonquin Regiment (15 December 1936) ===
- Regimental Headquarters (North Bay)
- HQ Company (Haileybury)
- A Company (Parry Sound)
- B Company (North Bay)
- C Company (Kirkland Lake)
- D Company (Timmins)

=== The Algonquin Regiment (1946) ===
- Regimental Headquarters (North Bay)
- HQ Company (Haileybury)
- A Company (North Bay)
- B Company (Timmins)
- C Company (Kirkland Lake)
- D Company (Kapuskasing)

=== The Algonquin Regiment (1970) ===
- Regimental Headquarters (North Bay)
- A Company (North Bay)
- B Company (Timmins)

=== The Algonquin Regiment (1987) ===
- Regimental Headquarters (North Bay)
- A Company (North Bay)
- B Company (Timmins)
- C Company (Cobalt)

=== The Algonquin Regiment (Northern Pioneers) (2024) ===
- Regimental Headquarters (North Bay)
- A Company (North Bay)
- B Company (Timmins)

== Alliances ==
- United Kingdom – The Rifles

== Battle honours ==
In the list below, battle honours in capitals were awarded for participation in large operations and campaigns, while those in lowercase indicate honours granted for more specific battles. Those battle honours followed in bold type are emblazoned on the regimental colour.

The regimental colour of The Algonquin Regiment.

=== Great War ===
- **Ypres, 1915, '17**
- **Festubert, 1915**
- Arras, 1917
- Hill 70
- **Somme, 1918**
- **St. Quentin**
- **Bapaume, 1918**
- **Hindenburg Line**
- Epéhy
- **St. Quentin Canal**
- **Beaurevoir**
- **Cambrai, 1918**
- **France and Flanders 1915, 1917–18**

=== Second World War ===
- Falaise
- **Falaise Road**
- The Laison
- Chambois
- **The Seine, 1944**
- **Moerkerke**
- **The Scheldt**
- Breskens Pocket
- **The Lower Maas**
- **The Rhineland**
- **The Hochwald**
- **Veen**
- **Küsten Canal**
- **Bad Zwischenahn**
- **North-West Europe, 1944–1945**

=== War in Afghanistan ===
- Afghanistan

== Notable soldiers ==
- William Merrifield VC MM
- Francis Pegahmagabow MM

== Recognition ==
Freedom of the city was exercised by The Algonquin Regiment in Timmins, Ontario, on September 22, 2012, and on September 22, 1977.

== Media ==
- I’ve Had Good Innings by Paul A. Mayer, OBE, GM, CD. Renfrew, ON: General House Publishing (autobiography of Paul Mayer who served in The Algonquin Regiment during World War Two).
- Sons of the Pioneers: Memories of Veterans of the Algonquin Regiment by John Macfie. Parry Sound, ON: The Hay Press, 2001
- Warpath : The Story of the Algonquin Regiment 1939–1945 by G. L. Cassidy, Cobalt ON: Highway Book Shop (1990)

== Music ==
"Molly" by Honorary Chaplain Edward H. Capp, published in Ottawa by Orme & Son, circa 1906 was dedicated to the 97th Regiment, Canada (Algonquin rifles). First line: "Hear the tramp of soldiers marching" Chorus: "One kiss, Molly e'er I go"

== Order of precedence ==
Preceded by The Cape Breton Highlanders	The Algonquin Regiment	Succeeded by The Argyll and Sutherland Highlanders of Canada (Princess Louise's)
