= 119 Squadron =

119 Squadron or 119th Squadron may refer to:

- No. 119 (Netherlands East Indies) Squadron RAAF, a unit of the Royal Australian Air Force
- No. 119 Squadron RAF, a unit of the United Kingdom Royal Air Force
- 119th Fighter Squadron, a unit of the United States Air Force
- 119th Command and Control Squadron, a unit of the United States Air Force
- 119 Squadron (Israel), the Israeli Air Force "Bat" Squadron

== See also ==
- 119th Division (disambiguation)
- 119th Battalion
- 119th Company
