= 119th Regiment =

119th Regiment or 119th Infantry Regiment may refer to:

- 119th Infantry (The Mooltan Regiment), a unit of the Indian Army
- Sassuntsi-Davit Tank Regiment (119th 'Sassuntsi-Davit' Separate Engineer Tank Regiment), a unit of the Soviet Army
- 119th (The Prince's Own) Regiment of Foot, a unit of the British Army
- 119th Regiment of Foot (1794), a unit of the British Army
- 119th Infantry Regiment (United States), a unit of the United States Army

== See also ==
- 119th Brigade (disambiguation)
- 119th Division (disambiguation)
- 119th Battalion
- 119th Company
- 119 Squadron (disambiguation)
