= Byce =

Surname list

Byce is a surname. Notable people with the surname include:

- Charles Henry Byce (1916–1994), Cree-Canadian soldier
- John Byce (born 1967), American ice hockey player

== See also ==
- Boyce (surname)
- Ryce
