= Babe Donnelly =

Canadian ice hockey player

- Born: December 22, 1894; Sault Ste. Marie, Ontario, Canada
- Died: July 27, 1968 (aged 73); Sault Ste. Marie, Ontario, Canada
- Height: 5 ft 7 in (170 cm)
- Weight: 180 lb (82 kg; 12 st 12 lb)
- Position: Defence
- Shot: Left
- Played for: Montreal Maroons
- Playing career: 1916–1936

James Joseph "Babe" Donnelly (December 22, 1894 – July 27, 1968) was a Canadian professional ice hockey player who played 34 games in the National Hockey League for the Montreal Maroons during the 1926–27 season. The rest of his career, which lasted from 1916 to 1935, was spent in various minor leagues. He was born in Sault Ste. Marie, Ontario, and died there in 1968.

== Career statistics ==
=== Regular season and playoffs ===
			Regular season					Playoffs
Season	Team	League	GP	G	A	Pts	PIM	GP	G	A	Pts	PIM
1916–17	Hamilton 227th Battalion	OHA Sr	9	7	0	7	—	—	—	—	—	—
1916–17	Toronto 204th Battalion	OHA Sr	—	—	—	—	—	—	—	—	—	—
1948–49	St. Catharines Teepees	OHA	45	24	20	44	37	5	2	2	4	4
1919–20	Edmonton Eskimos	BIG-4	11	3	1	4	6	2	0	1	1	2
1920–21	Sault Ste. Marie Greyhounds	NOHA	9	3	4	7	18	5	2	3	5	—
1920–21	Sault Ste. Marie Greyhounds	NMHL-NA	14	8	4	12	—	—	—	—	—	—
1921–22	Sault Ste. Marie Greyhounds	NOHA	8	9	3	12	12	2	1	1	2	6
1921–22	Sault Ste. Marie Greyhounds	NMHL-NA	11	9	4	13	—	—	—	—	—	—
1922–23	Sault Ste. Marie Greyhounds	NOHA	7	3	0	3	25	2	1	0	1	4
1922–23	Sault Ste. Marie Greyhounds	Al-Cup	—	—	—	—	—	5	2	2	4	4
1923–24	Sault Ste. Marie Greyhounds	NOHA	7	8	2	10	18	—	—	—	—	—
1923–24	Sault Ste. Marie Greyhounds	Al-Cup	—	—	—	—	—	7	6	1	7	21
1924–25	Sault Ste. Marie Greyhounds	NOHA	—	—	—	—	—	—	—	—	—	—
1925–26	Sault Ste. Marie Greyhounds	CHL	32	8	2	10	40	—	—	—	—	—
1926–27	Montreal Maroons	NHL	34	0	1	1	14	2	0	0	0	0
1926–27	Stratford Nationals	Can-Pro	1	0	0	0	2	—	—	—	—	—
1926–27	Detroit Greyhounds	AHA	6	1	0	1	13	—	—	—	—	—
1927–28	Minneapolis Millers	AHA	26	1	2	3	32	—	—	—	—	—
1928–29	Philadelphia Arrows	Can-Am	22	1	1	2	20	—	—	—	—	—
1929–30	London Panthers	IHL	12	4	1	5	16	—	—	—	—	—
1929–30	Toronto Millionaires	IHL	3	0	0	0	2	—	—	—	—	—
1930–31	Buffalo Americans	AHA	39	5	9	14	90	—	—	—	—	—
1931–32	Buffalo Majors	AHA	16	4	2	6	21	—	—	—	—	—
1931–32	Tulsa Oilers	AHA	21	1	0	1	30	—	—	—	—	—
1932–33	Falconbridge Falcons	NOHA	—	—	—	—	—	—	—	—	—	—
1933–34	Falconbridge Falcons	NOHA	—	—	—	—	—	—	—	—	—	—
1934–35	Falconbridge Falcons	NOHA	5	0	1	1	8	2	1	0	1	0
AHA totals			108	12	13	25	186	—	—	—	—	—
NHL totals			34	0	1	1	14	2	0	0	0	0
