= Robert Angus Keane =

Canadian Army officer (1914–1977)

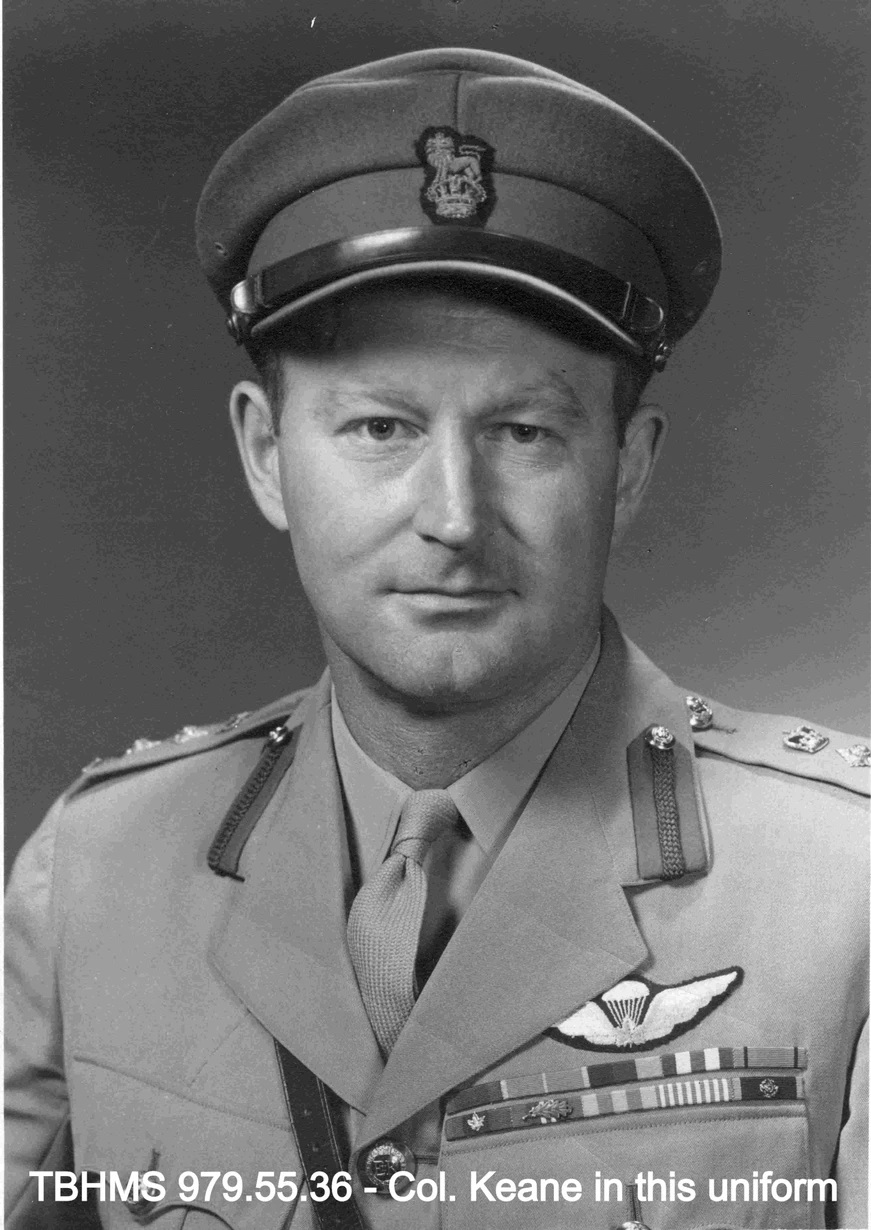
- Born: May 14, 1914; Fort William, Ontario
- Died: August 16, 1977 (aged 63); Thunder Bay, Ontario
- Military career
- Allegiance: Canada
- Branch: Canadian Army
- Service years: 1930-1965
- Rank: Colonel
- Nickname: "Bob Keane"
- Units: 4 Field Ambulance; The Lake Superior Regiment
- Commands: The Lake Superior Regiment (Motor); 2nd Battalion, The Royal Canadian Regiment
- Conflicts: Second World War: Normandy Campaign; Korean War
- Awards: Distinguished Service Order; Officer of the Order of the British Empire; 1939–1945 Star; France and Germany Star; Defence Medal; Canadian Volunteer Service Medal; War Medal 1939–1945 with MiD; Korea Medal; United Nations Korea Medal; Canadian Efficiency Decoration; Canadian Forces' Decoration

Colonel Robert Angus Keane DSO OBE ED CD (14 May 1914 – 16 August 1977) was a Canadian military officer and commander who served with the Canadian Army in both World War II and the Korean War.

== Career ==
First enlisting at age 15 in the Canadian Militia, Keane was commissioned in 1935 as a Lieutenant with The Lake Superior Regiment. Already a captain and the LSR's Adjutant at the start of World War II, Keane was mobilized for active service along with the rest of regiment. Promoted to major and serving as the LSR's second in command when the regiment was sent to Normandy after the Normandy landings, Keane was promoted to lieutenant colonel and commanded the Lake Superior Regiment (Motor) from August 1944 until the end of the war in May 1945. He joined the Regular Force after the war, Keane served with the Directorate of Military Operations and Plans at the National Defence Headquarters. When the Korean War broke out, he was personally chosen to command the Royal Canadian Regiment for service with the 25th Canadian Infantry Brigade in Korea. After commanding 2RCR in Korea, Keane returned to Canada and promoted to the rank of colonel, serving in various senior capacities until retiring from the army in 1965.

== Later life ==
Keane died from cancer in Thunder Bay in 1977 at age 63.
