= 49th Field Artillery Regiment, RCA =

- 49^{e} Régiment d'artillerie de campagne, ARC
- Active: 1913–present
- Country: Canada
- Branch: Canadian Army
- Role: Field artillery
- Size: 1 field battery of 4 guns
- Part of: 33 Canadian Brigade Group
- Garrison/HQ: Sault Ste. Marie, Ontario
- Website: www.canada.ca/en/army/corporate/4-canadian-division/49-field-artillery-regiment.html

49th Field Artillery Regiment, RCA, is a Canadian Forces Primary Reserve regiment based in Sault Ste. Marie, Ontario. The regiment is part of 4th Canadian Division's 33 Canadian Brigade Group.

It draws much of its history from the Sault Ste. Marie Regiment, an infantry regiment of the Non-Permanent Active Militia of the Canadian Militia (now the Canadian Army). First organized in 1913 as the 51st Soo Rifles, a rifle regiment, at Sault Ste. Marie, volunteers from the regiment fought in the First World War. It was renamed in 1920 as The Soo Rifles, and for the final time in 1923, as The Sault Ste. Marie Regiment. In 1936, the regiment was amalgamated with A Company of The Algonquin Regiment to form The Sault Ste Marie and Sudbury Regiment.

In 1946, the regiment was converted to artillery, and continues to exist today as the 49th Field Artillery Regiment, RCA.

== History ==
=== The Sault Ste. Marie and Sudbury Regiment ===
The beginnings of the regiment start in 1802 when a detachment of the 49th Regiment of Foot was stationed in the area at Fort St. Joseph. The numeric designation of today's unit is derived from the original regiment of foot. In 1879, the first active militia infantry company was divided with 21 men being formed into a half battery of mountain artillery armed with two seven-pounder mountain guns.

In 1889, a half company of infantry was raised to company strength becoming No. 6 Company of the 96th District of Algoma Battalion of Rifles. In 1892, the company of infantry became independent and at the end of 1892, the half battery of artillery was disbanded.

In 1900, a new regiment called the 97th Regiment Algonquin Rifles was formed with regimental headquarters in Sault Ste. Marie. The regiment sent volunteers to the Second Boer War and also furnished aid to the civilian government by quelling a riot at a paper mill. The regiment had companies in Thessalon, Sudbury and Sturgeon Falls.

In 1913, the 51st Regiment, known as the Soo Rifles, was formed. In October 1914, one company, 125 all ranks, under Captain J. Johnston went to England with the 2nd Battalion, CEF. Later in 1915, a second company of 125 men went overseas with the 19th Battalion, CEF. This was followed in 1916 by a third detachment from Sault Ste. Marie of 150 men joining the 37th Battalion, CEF.

Previously, in November 1915, the 119th Battalion, CEF, was organized and was followed in March 1916 by the organization of 227th Battalion, CEF. Upon arrival in England, these battalions were broken up and the men were sent as replacements to other units.

=== First World War ===
On 6 August 1914, Details from the 51st Regiment (Soo Rifles) were placed on active service for local protection duties.

On 22 December 1915, the 119th (Algoma) Battalion, CEF was authorized for service and on 8 August 1916, the battalion embarked for Great Britain. After its arrival in the UK, the battalion provided reinforcements to the Canadian Corps in the field. In February 1917, the battalion was allotted to the 15th Canadian Brigade, 5th Canadian Division in England. On 16 April 1918, the battalion's personnel were absorbed by the 8th Reserve Battalion, CEF. On 29 November 1918, the 119th Battalion, CEF was disbanded.

On 15 July 1916, the 226th Battalion (Men of the North), CEF was authorized for service and on 16 December 1916, the battalion embarked for Great Britain. After its arrival in the UK, on 20 January 1917, the battalion's personnel were absorbed by the 14th Reserve Battalion, CEF to provide reinforcements for the Canadian Corps in the field. On 27 July 1917, the 226th Battalion, CEF was disbanded.

On 15 July 1916, the 227th (Sudbury-Manitoulin-Algoma) Battalion (Men o' the North), CEF was authorized for service and on 11 April 1917, the battalion embarked for Great Britain. After its arrival in the UK, on 23 April 1917, the battalion's personnel were absorbed by the 8th Reserve Battalion, CEF to provide reinforcements for the Canadian Corps in the field. On 11 April 1918, the 227th Battalion, CEF was disbanded.

=== Second World War ===
On 26 August 1939, Details from The Sault Ste. Marie and Sudbury Regiment (MG) were called out for service and on 1 September 1939, were then placed on active service for local protection duties under the designation The Sault Ste. Marie and Sudbury Regiment (MG), CASF. On 31 December 1940, the details called out on active service were disbanded.

On 29 July 1941, the regiment mobilized the 1st Battalion, The Sault Ste. Marie and Sudbury Regiment, CASF for active service. The battalion served within Canada in a home defence role as part of the 18th Canadian Infantry Brigade, 6th Canadian Infantry Division. On 30 October 1945, the battalion was disbanded.

=== 49th Field Artillery Regiment, RCA ===
The 49th Field Regiment was authorized on 1 April 1946 first as the 58th Light Anti-Aircraft Regiment (Sault Ste. Marie and Sudbury Regiment), RCA, through the conversion of the 2nd (Reserve) Battalion, The Sault Ste. Marie and Sudbury Regiment. In 1947 the regiment was renumbered as the 49th going through a number of name changes. From 1947 to 1952, it was designated the 49th Heavy Anti-Aircraft Regiment (Sault Ste. Marie Regiment), RCA and consisted of three batteries: 30th, 148th and 153rd. The designation was then changed to the 49th (Sault Ste Marie) Medium Anti-Aircraft Regiment, RCA, then 49th (Sault Ste. Marie) Field Artillery Regiment, RCA in 1962, and re-designated 49th Field Artillery Regiment, RCA in January 1981.

As of 2022 the 49th Field Regiment was commanded by Lieutenant-Colonel Brian Nadon. The regimental sergeant major was Chief Warrant Officer Christopher Predum.

== Allocated batteries ==
- 30th Field Battery, RCA
- 148th Field Battery, RCA

== Lineage ==
=== The Sault Ste. Marie Regiment ===
- Originated on 15 November 1913, in Sault Ste. Marie, Ontario, as 8-Company Infantry Regiment, City Corps.
- Redesignated on 10 February 1914, as the 51st Regiment Rifles.
- Redesignated on 16 February 1914, as the 51st Regiment (The Soo Rifles).
- Redesignated on 15 August 1914, as the 51st Regiment (Soo Rifles).
- Redesignated on 1 May 1920, as The Soo Rifles.
- Redesignated on 1 September 1923, as The Sault Ste. Marie Regiment.
- Amalgamated on 15 December 1936, with the Headquarters and A Company of The Algonquin Regiment and redesignated The Sault Ste. Marie and Sudbury Regiment (MG) (now the 49th Field Artillery Regiment, RCA).

=== 49th Field Artillery Regiment, RCA ===
- Originated on 15 November 1913, in Sault Ste. Marie, Ontario, when an eight-company infantry regiment, City Corps was authorized to be formed.
- Redesignated on 10 February 1914, as the 51st Regiment Rifles.
- Redesignated on 16 February 1914, as the 51st Regiment (The Soo Rifles).
- Redesignated on 15 August 1914, as the 51st Regiment (Soo Rifles).
- Redesignated on 1 May 1920, as The Soo Rifles.
- Redesignated on 1 September 1923, as The Sault Ste. Marie Regiment.
- Amalgamated on 15 December 1936, with the Headquarters and "A" Company of The Algonquin Regiment and redesignated The Sault Ste. Marie and Sudbury Regiment (MG).
- Redesignated on 7 November 1940, as the 2nd (Reserve) Battalion, The Sault Ste. Marie and Sudbury Regiment (MG).
- Redesignated on 24 March 1942, as the 2nd (Reserve) Battalion, The Sault Ste. Marie and Sudbury Regiment.
- Converted to Artillery on 1 April 1946, and redesignated as the 58th Light Anti-Aircraft Regiment (Sault Ste. Marie and Sudbury Regiment), RCA.
- Redesignated on 3 July 1947, as the 49th Heavy Anti-Aircraft Regiment (Sault Ste. Marie Regiment), RCA. At this time the Sudbury component became 58th Light Anti-Aircraft Regiment, RCA.
- Redesignated on 16 May 1949, as the 49th (Sault Ste. Marie) Heavy Anti-Aircraft Regiment, RCA.
- Redesignated on 22 August 1955, as the 49th (Sault Ste. Marie) Medium Anti-Aircraft Regiment, RCA.
- Redesignated on 12 April 1960, as the 49th (Sault Ste. Marie) Medium Anti-Aircraft Artillery Regiment, RCA.
- Redesignated on 10 December 1962, as the 49th (Sault Ste. Marie) Field Artillery Regiment, RCA.
- Redesignated on 1 January 1981, as the 49th Field Artillery Regiment, RCA.

== Organization ==
=== 51st Regiment (The Soo Rifles) (16 February 1914) ===
- Regimental Headquarters (Sault Ste. Marie, ON)
- A Company
- B Company
- C Company
- D Company
- E Company
- F Company
- G Company
- H Company

=== 51st Regiment (Soo Rifles) (1 March 1916) ===
- Regimental Headquarters (Sault Ste. Marie, ON)
- A Company
- B Company
- C Company
- D Company

=== The Soo Rifles (1 May 1920) ===
- Regimental Headquarters (Sault Ste. Marie, ON)
- A Company
- B Company
- C Company
- D Company

=== The Sault Ste. Marie Regiment (3 July 1923) ===
- 1st Battalion (perpetuating the 119th Battalion, CEF)
- 2nd (Reserve) Battalion (perpetuating the 227th Battalion, CEF)

== Alliances ==
- The Hampshire Regiment (1932-1936)

== Battle honours ==
In 1930, the Sault Ste. Marie Regiment was awarded these battle honours, which became dormant when the regiment converted to artillery in 1946, being subsumed under the RCA's honorary distinction ubique ('everywhere').

- Arras, 1917, '18
- Hill 70
- Ypres, 1917
- Amiens
- Hindenburg Line
- Pursuit to Mons

=== Lineage chart ===
Lineage chart

1913	8-coy infy regt, city corps
1914	51st Regt "Rifles"
1914	51st Regt "The Soo Rifles"
1914	51st Regt (Soo Rifles)
1915	119th "Overseas" Bn, CEF
1916	226th "Overseas" Bn, CEF	227th "Overseas" Bn, CEF
1917	Absorbed by 14th Reserve Bn	Absorbed by 8th Reserve Bn
1918	Absorbed by 8th Reserve Bn
1920	1st Bn (119th Bn, CEF), The Soo Rifles	2nd Bn (226th Bn, CEF), (Note: Reserve) The Soo Rifles
1923	1st Bn (119th Bn, CEF), The Sault Ste. Marie Regt	2nd Bn (227th Bn, CEF), The Sault Ste. Marie Regt
HQ and A Coy, The Algonquin Regt
1936	Disbanded
1936	The Sault Ste. Marie and Sudbury Regt (MG)
1940	2nd (Reserve) Bn, The Sault Ste. Marie and Sudbury Regt (MG)
1941	1st Bn, The Sault Ste. Marie and Sudbury Regt, CASF
1942	2nd (Reserve) Bn, The Sault Ste. Marie and Sudbury Regt
1945	Disbanded
1946	58th Light Anti-Aircraft Regt (Sault Ste. Marie and Sudbury Regt), RCA
1947	49th Heavy Anti-Aircraft Regt (Sault Ste. Marie Regt), RCA	58th Light Anti-Aircraft Regt, RCA
1949	49th (Sault Ste. Marie) Heavy Anti-Aircraft Regt, RCA
1955	49th (Sault Ste. Marie) Medium Anti-Aircraft Regt, RCA
1960	49th (Sault Ste. Marie) Medium Anti-Aircraft Arty Regt, RCA
1962	49th (Sault Ste. Marie) Fd Arty Regt, RCA
1981	49th Fd Arty Regt, RCA

== Perpetuations ==
- 119th (Algoma) Battalion, CEF
- 226th Battalion (Men of the North), CEF
- 227th (Sudbury-Manitoulin-Algoma) Battalion (Men o' the North), CEF

== Recognition ==
The regiment was granted the Freedom of the City of Sault Ste. Marie on 1 July 1967 and on 26 May 2012.

== Order of precedence ==
Preceded by 42nd Field Artillery Regiment (Lanark and Renfrew Scottish), RCA	49th Field Artillery Regiment, RCA	Succeeded by 56th Field Artillery Regiment, RCA
