= 159th Battalion (1st Algonquins), CEF =

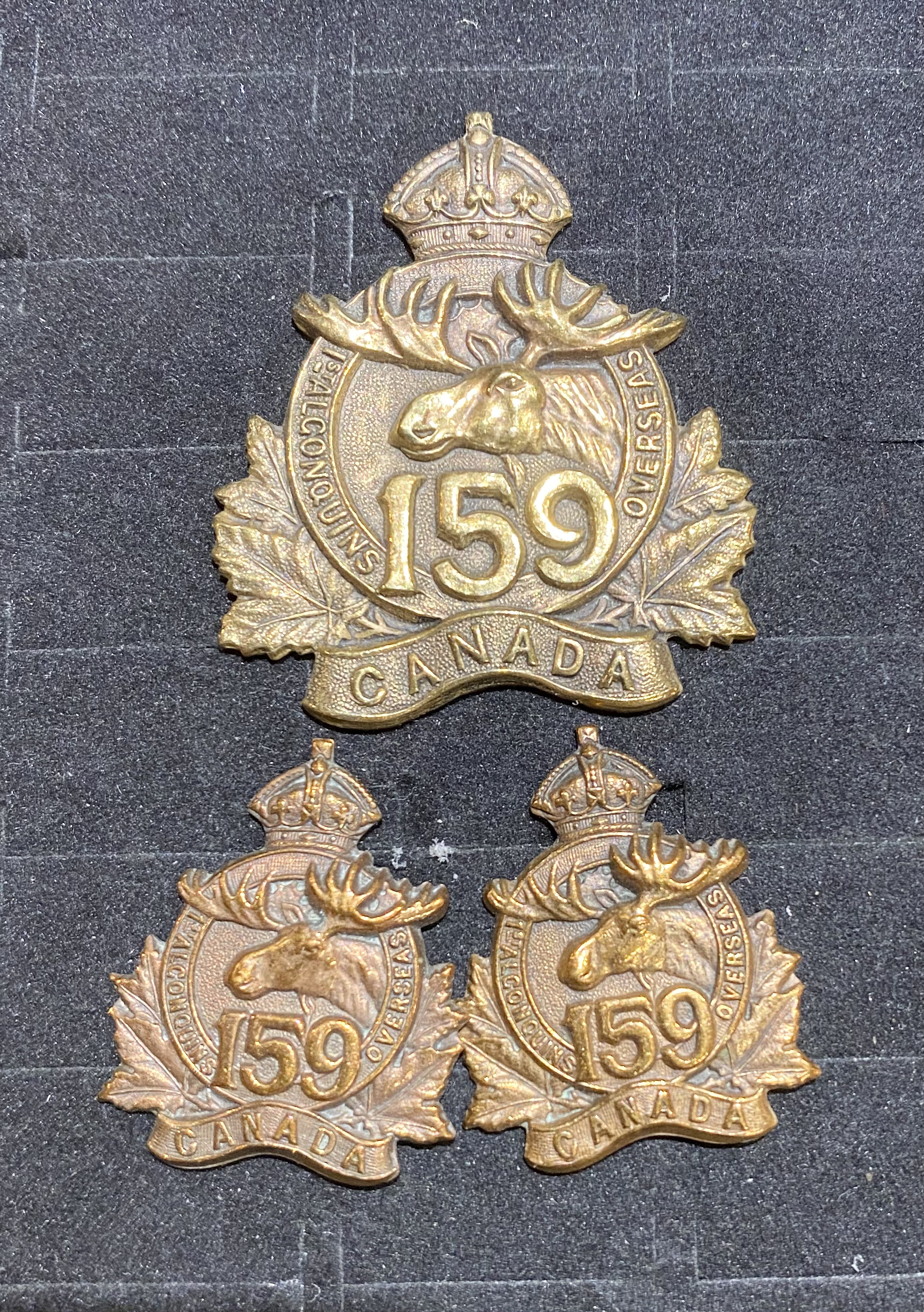
159 Algonquin NCM

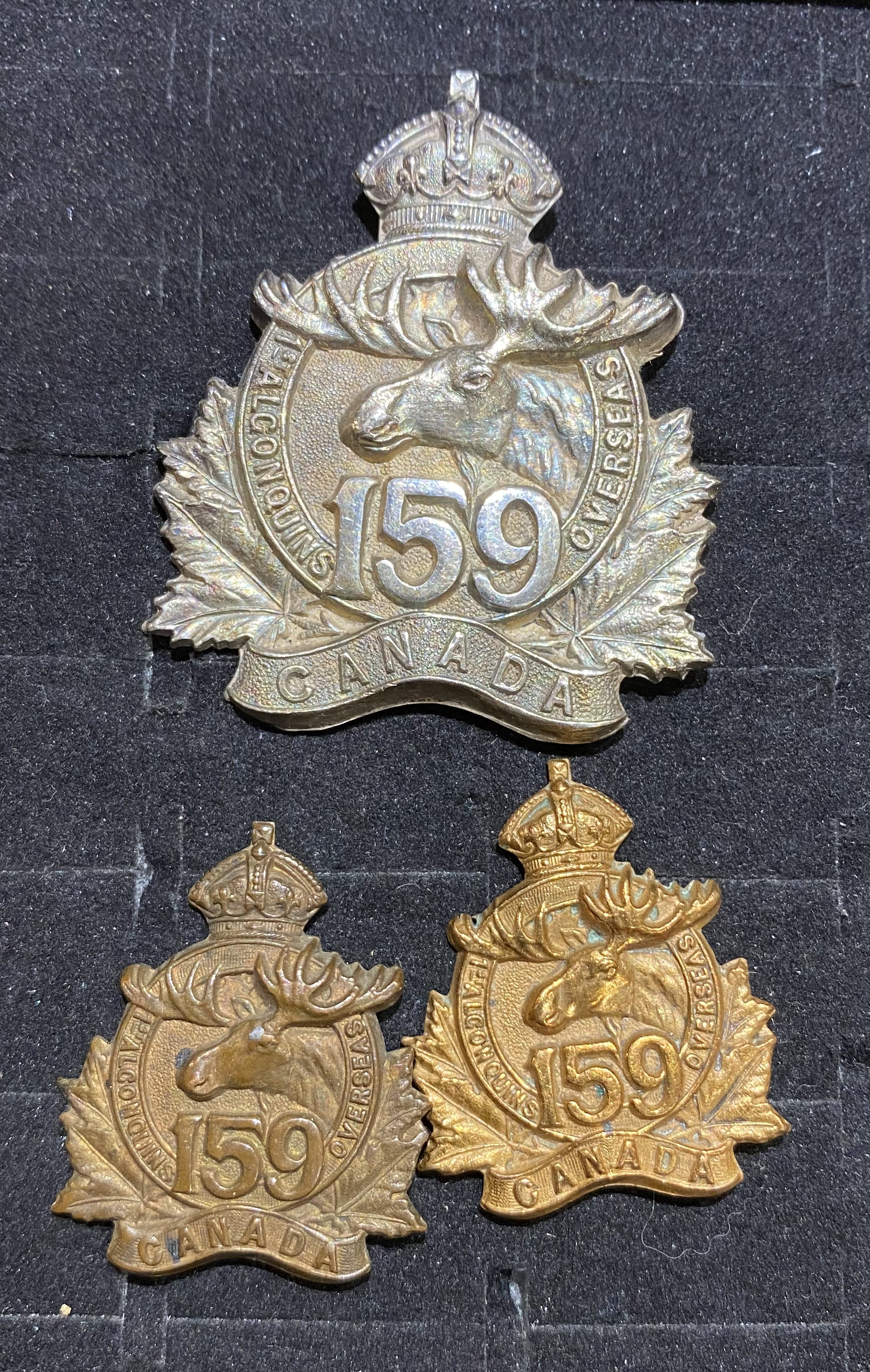
159 Algonquin NCO

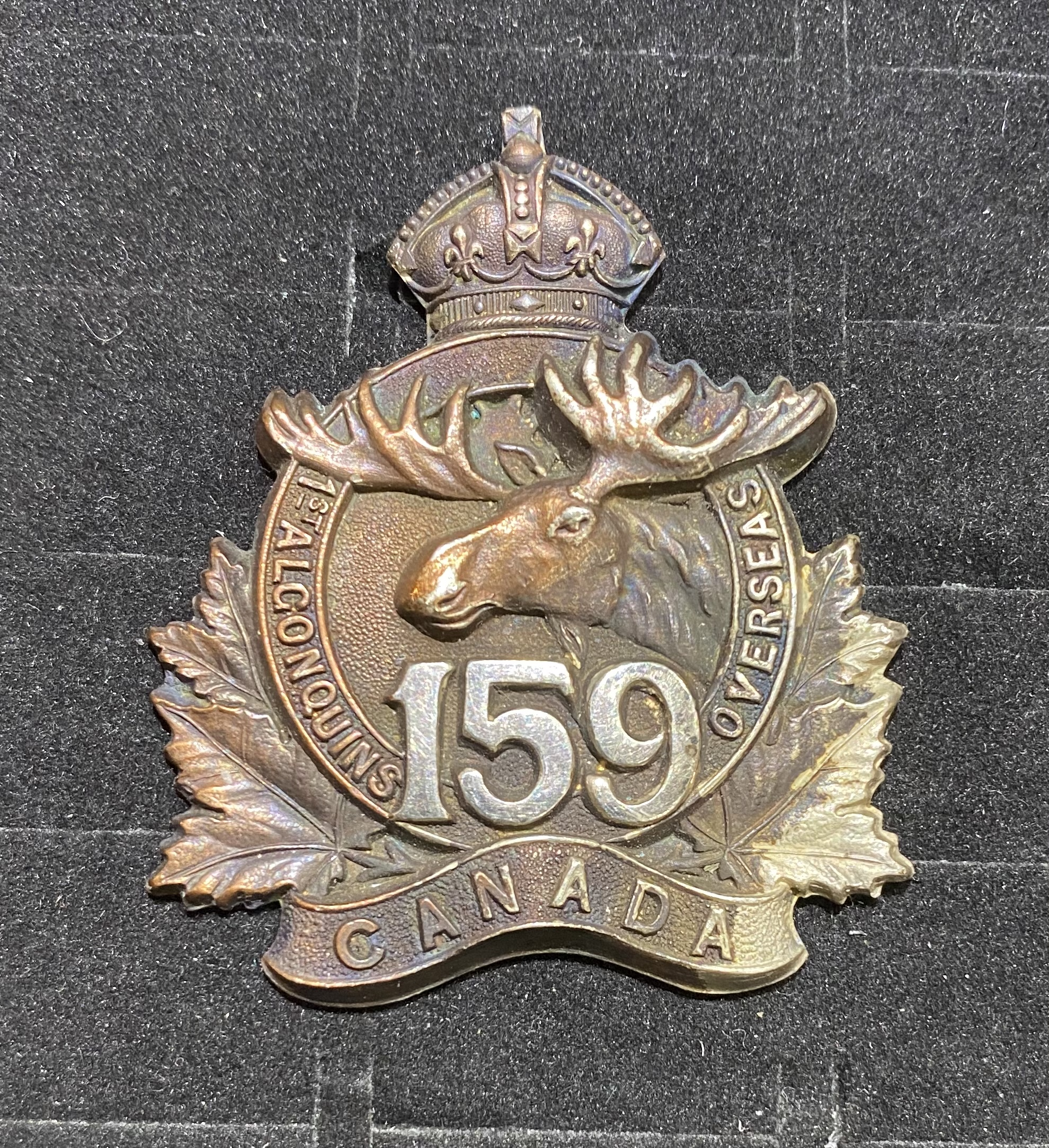
159 Algonquin Officer

The 159th (1st Algonquins) Battalion, CEF, was a unit in the Canadian Expeditionary Force during the First World War. Based in Haileybury, Ontario, the unit began recruiting in late 1915 in the districts of Nipissing and Sudbury. After sailing to England in November 1916, the battalion was absorbed into the 8th Reserve Battalion on January 20, 1917. The 159th (1st Algonquins) Battalion, CEF, had one Officer Commanding: Lieut-Col. Ernest Frederick Armstrong.

The battalion is perpetuated by The Algonquin Regiment (Northern Pioneers).
