= 257th Battalion, CEF =

The 257th Battalion, CEF was a unit in the Canadian Expeditionary Force during the First World War. Mobilized in Saint John, New Brunswick, the unit recruited from that province as well as along with Quebec Ontario. Commanded by Lieut-Col. L. T. Martin, the battalion sailed from Halifax, Nova Scotia on 17 February 1917 aboard S.S. Missanabie and arrived in England on 26 February 1917 with a strength of 29 officers and 902 other ranks. Re-designated as 7th Battalion, Canadian Railway Troops serving in France and Flanders from 1917 to 1919.

Most of the late war formations were smaller groups some less than 400 men. The 257th however could be considered on the large side of the general battalion numbers with over 900 men. This battalion served in the field in France until the end of the war, and was disbanded in the fall of 1920.
