= Lake Superior Scottish Regiment =

The Lake Superior Scottish Regiment
- Regimental badge
- Active: 1885-1896 (96th District of Algoma Battalion); 1905–present
- Country: Canada
- Branch: Canadian Army
- Type: Line infantry
- Role: Light infantry
- Size: One battalion
- Part of: 38 Canadian Brigade Group
- Garrison/HQ: O'Kelly VC Armoury, Thunder Bay, Ontario
- Nickname: "The Lake Sups"
- Motto: Inter pericula intrepidi (Latin for 'Fearless in the face of danger')
- March: Quick: "Hielan' Laddie"
- Engagements: First World War; Second World War; War in Afghanistan
- Battle honours: See #Battle Honours
- Website: canada.ca/en/army/corporate/3-canadian-division/the-lake-superior-scottish-regiment.html

Commanders
- Commanding officer: LCol J Davis
- Regimental sergeant major: CWO Jonathon O'Connor
- Honorary colonel: HCol Michel S. Beaulieu
- Honorary lieutenant-colonel: HLCol Gail Brescia
- Notable commanders: Colonel Robert Angus Keane, DSO

Insignia
- Tartan: McGillivray
- Abbreviation: LSSR

The Lake Superior Scottish Regiment is a Primary Reserve infantry regiment of the Canadian Forces. The regiment is in Thunder Bay, Ontario, and is part of the 3rd Canadian Division's 38 Canadian Brigade Group. Also known as "The Lake Sups" (pronounced soups), the regiment was active during the First and Second World Wars. During the latter, the regiment, then known as The Lake Superior Regiment or LSR, mobilized a motorized infantry battalion for the 4th Canadian (Armoured) Division; The Lake Superior Regiment (Motor) or LSR(M).

The LSR(M) and 28th Armoured Regiment (The British Columbia Regiment) were the only Canadian land-based units to score a naval victory during the Second World War. On November 5, 1944, the units sank three small German ships and destroyed a fourth in the port of Zijpe. One of the ships was likely the AF-92, a landing-craft-type vessel, about 153 feet (47 m) long, equipped to lay mines, and armed with two 88 mm guns. One legend suggests a mortar round fired by the infantry made its way down the funnel of one of the ships. The ship's bell from one of the sunken vessels was recovered, and is in the Officer's Mess of the British Columbia Regiment (Duke of Connaught's Own).

Since World War II, its soldiers have served throughout the world on numerous peacekeeping operations. Most recently, the LSSR has had several soldiers serve in Afghanistan. The regiment lost one soldier, Corporal Anthony "T-Bone" Boneca on July 9, 2006, fighting Taliban insurgents during Operation Zahar ("sword") in Zhari District, Kandahar Province.

== Regimental information ==
The regimental colour of The Lake Superior Scottish Regiment.

The camp flag of The Lake Superior Scottish Regiment.

=== Armoral description ===
A large maple leaf in center charged with a beaver, encircled by an annulus, inscribed THE LAKE SUPERIOR SCOTTISH REGIMENT and surmounted by the Crown; below a scroll inscribed INTER PERICULA INTREPIDI; on each side of the annulus with six maple leaves.

=== Motto ===
Inter Pericula Intrepidi Fearless in the face of danger

=== Official abbreviation ===
Lake Sup Scot R

=== Tartan ===
MacGillivary

== Lineage ==
=== 96th District of Algoma Battalion of Rifles ===
- Originated 24 April 1885, as the Port Arthur Rifle Company in Port Arthur, Ontario when an independent company of rifles was authorized to be formed
- Designated 10 December 1886 as the Provisional Battalion of Rifles with companies in Port Arthur, Fort William, Rat Portage, and Gore Bay
- Redesignated on 29 April 1887 as the 96th District of Algoma Battalion of Rifles
- Disbanded on 21 August 1896

=== The Lake Superior Scottish Regiment ===
- Originated 3 July 1905 in Port Arthur, Ontario when a "regiment of infantry" was authorized to be formed
- Designated 1 December 1905 as the 96th The Lake Superior Regiment
- Redesignated 12 March 1920 as The Lake Superior Regiment
- Redesignated 7 November 1940 as the 2nd (Reserve) Battalion, The Lake Superior Regiment
- Redesignated 1 April 1946 as The Lake Superior Regiment (Motor)
- Redesignated 29 June 1949 as The Lake Superior Scottish Regiment (Motor)
- Redesignated 11 April 1958 as The Lake Superior Scottish Regiment

=== Lineage chart ===
Lineage chart

1905	96th The Lake Superior Regt
1914	52nd Bn, CEF
1915	141st "Overseas" Bn, CEF
1917	Absorbed by 18th Reserve Bn, CEF
1920	Disbanded	1st Bn (52nd Bn, CEF), The Lake Superior Regt	2nd Bn (94th Bn, CEF), (Note: Reserve) The Lake Superior Regt
1921	2nd Bn (141st Bn, CEF), The Lake Superior Regt
1936	The Lake Superior Regt	Disbanded
1940	The Lake Superior Regt, CASF
1940	1st Bn, The Lake Superior Regt, CASF	2nd (Reserve) Bn, The Lake Superior Regt
1942	1st Bn, The Lake Superior Regt (Motor), CASF
1946	Disbanded	The Lake Superior Regt (Motor)
1949	The Lake Superior Scottish Regt (Motor)
1958	The Lake Superior Scottish Regt

== Perpetuations ==
=== 1885-1896 ===
96th District of Algoma Battalion of Rifles

=== The Great War ===
- 52nd Battalion (New Ontario), CEF
- 141st (Rainy River District) Battalion (Border Bull Moose), CEF

== Operational history ==
=== North-West Rebellion ===
The Port Arthur Rifle Company was originally raised on 24 April 1885 in response to the outbreak of the North-West Rebellion. The company and the subsequent 96th District of Algoma Battalion of Rifles served in defense of the area following the rebellion.

=== The Great War ===
Details of the 96th The Lake Superior Regiment were placed on active service on 6 August 1914 for local protective duty.

The 52nd Battalion (New Ontario), CEF, was authorized on 7 November 1914 and embarked for Britain on 23 November 1915. The battalion disembarked in France on 21 February 1916, where it fought as part of the 9th Infantry Brigade, 3rd Canadian Division in France and Flanders until the end of the war. The battalion disbanded on 30 August 1920.

The 141st (Rainy River District) Battalion (Border Bull Moose), CEF, was authorized on 22 December 1915 and embarked for Britain on 29 April 1917, where its personnel were absorbed by the 18th Reserve Battalion, CEF on 7 May 1917 to provide reinforcements for the Canadian Corps in the field. The battalion disbanded on 17 July 1917.

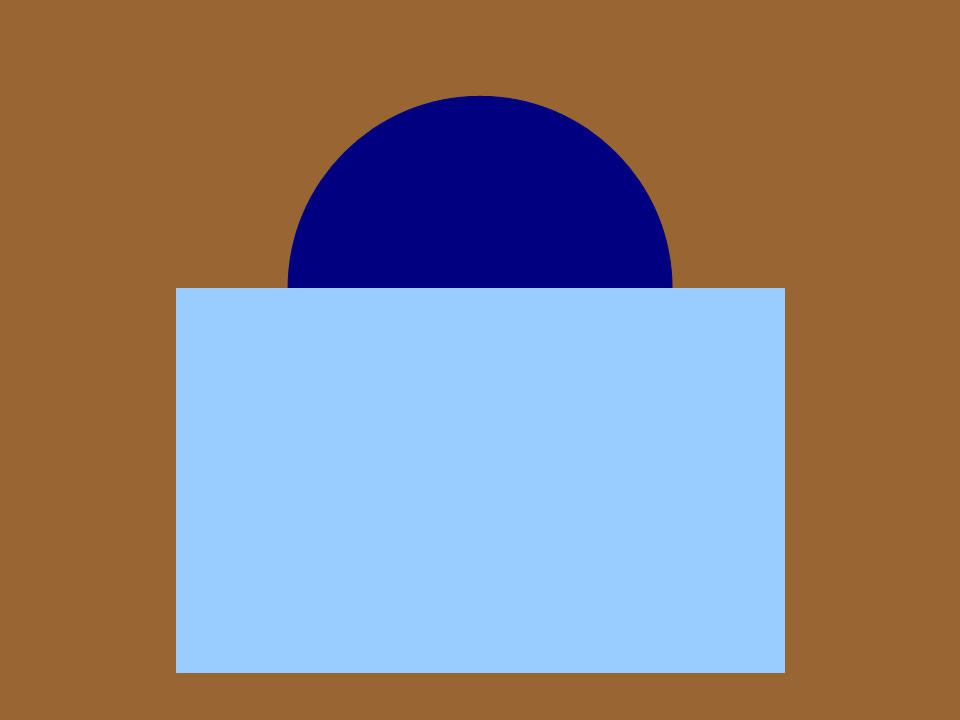
The distinguishing patch of the 52nd Battalion (New Ontario), CEF.

=== The Second World War ===
The regiment mobilized The Lake Superior Regiment, CASF, on 24 May 1940. It was redesignated as the 1st Battalion, The Lake Superior Regiment, CASF, on 7 November 1940 and as the 1st Battalion, The Lake Superior Regiment (Motor), CASF, on 26 January 1942. It embarked for Britain on 22 August 1942. On 26 and 27 July 1944, it landed in France as part of the 4th Canadian Armoured Brigade, 4th Canadian (Armoured) Division, and it continued to fight in northwest Europe until the end of the war. The overseas battalion disbanded on 15 February 1946.

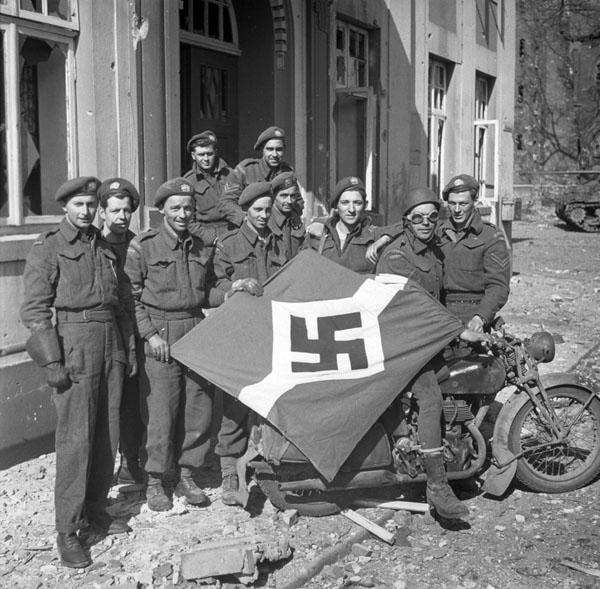
Lake Superior Regiment with captured Hitler Youth flag, Friesoythe, Germany, 16 April 1945

=== War In Afghanistan ===
The regiment contributed an aggregate of more than 20% of its authorized strength to the various Task Forces which served in Afghanistan between 2002 and 2014.

== Alliances ==
- United Kingdom – The Royal Anglian Regiment
- Australia – 5th/6th Battalion, The Royal Victoria Regiment

== Battle honours ==
In the list below, battle honours in capitals were awarded for participation in large operations and campaigns, while those in lowercase indicate honours granted for more specific battles. Those battle honours followed by a "+" are emblazoned on the regimental colour.

The regimental colour of The Lake Superior Scottish Regiment.

=== The Great War ===
- Ypres, 1915, '17+
- Festubert, 1915
- Mount Sorrel+
- Somme, 1916+
- Flers-Courcelette
- Ancre Heights
- Arras, 1917, '18
- Vimy, 1917+
- Hill 70+
- Passchendaele+
- Amiens+
- Scarpe, 1918
- Drocourt-Quéant
- Hindenburg Line+
- Canal du Nord
- Cambrai, 1918+
- Valenciennes+
- France and Flanders, 1915–18

=== The Second World War ===
- Falaise+
- Falaise Road+
- The Laison
- Chambois
- The Scheldt+
- The Lower Maas+
- The Rhineland+
- The Hochwald+
- Veen
- Twente Canal+
- Friesoythe+
- Küsten Canal+
- Bad Zwischenahn
- North-West Europe, 1944–1945+

=== War in Afghanistan ===
- Afghanistan

== Notable soldiers ==
- Major Christopher O'Kelly, VC MC
- Colonel Robert Angus Keane, DSO OBE ED CD
- Sergeant Charles Henry Byce, DCM MM
- Lieutenant-General Omer Lavoie, CMM MSC CD

== See also ==
- Canadian-Scottish regiment
- List of armouries in Canada
- Military history of Canada
- History of the Canadian Army
- Canadian Forces
- Razing of Friesoythe

== Order of precedence ==
Preceded by The Argyll and Sutherland Highlanders of Canada (Princess Louise's)	The Lake Superior Scottish Regiment	Succeeded by The North Saskatchewan Regiment

== Armoury ==
Site	Date(s)	Designated	Description	Image
O'Kelly VC Armoury; 317 Park Avenue; Thunder Bay, Ontario	1913 David Ewart	Canada's Register of Historic Places	Housing The Lake Superior Scottish Regiment, this two-storey, gable-roofed Baronial style drill hall is centrally located.	
