= Corps of Canadian Railway Troops =

- Active: 1917–1920
- Country: Canada
- Branch: Canadian Expeditionary Force
- Role: Railway troops
- Size: 1,500 (Initial full strength) 13,000 (overall)
- Garrison/HQ: Saint John, NB

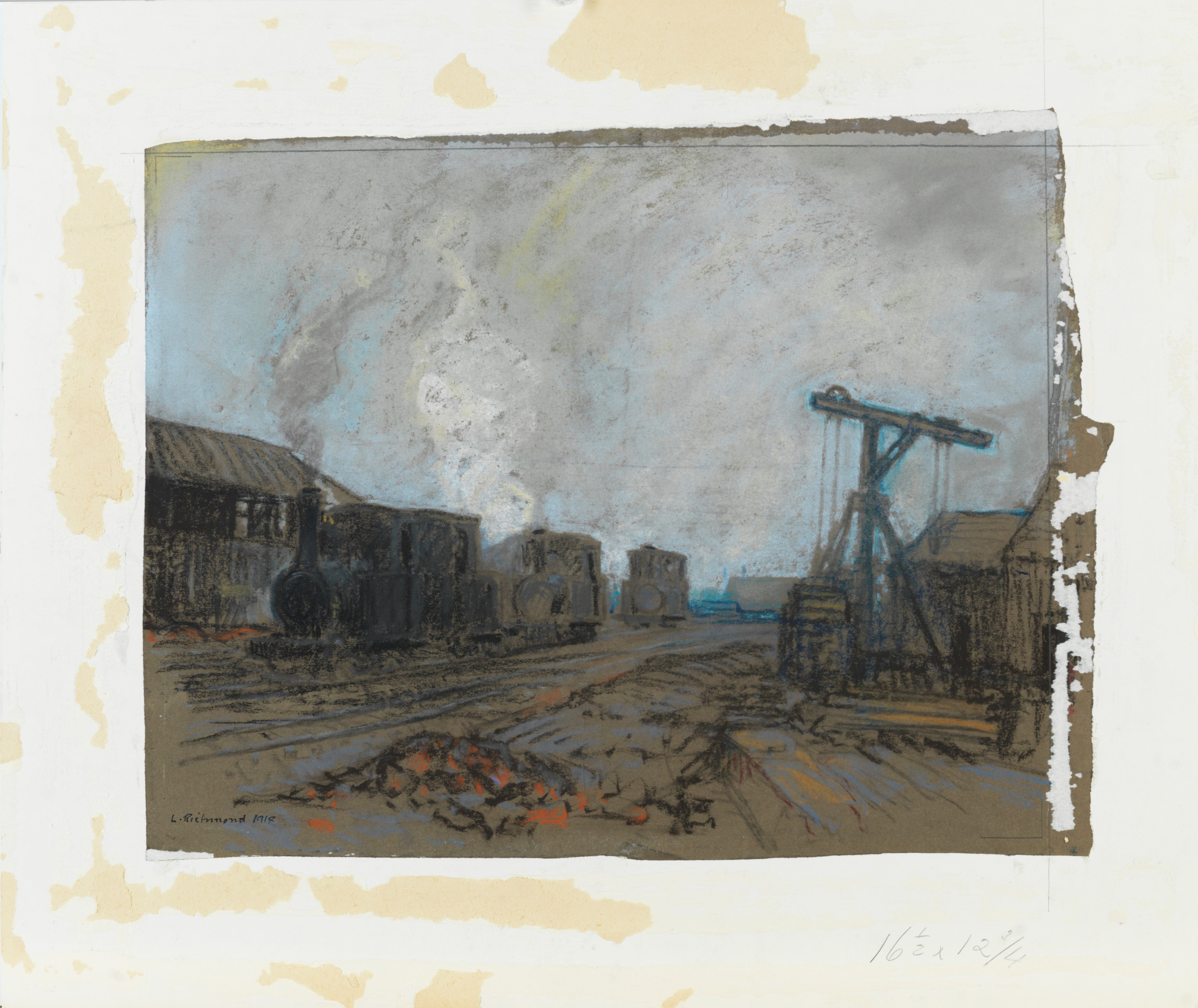

The Corps of Canadian Railway Troops were part of the Canadian Expeditionary Force (CEF) during World War I. Although Canadian railway units had been arriving in France since August 1915, it was not until March 1917 that the units were placed under a unified headquarters named the Canadian Railway Troops. They were redesignated as the "Corps of ..." on 23 April 1918. The corps was disbanded along with the rest of the CEF on 1 November 1920.

== Organization ==
The initial 500 men came from the Canadian Pacific Railway, but overall the railway troops had 13,000 members.

- Canadian Overseas Railway Construction Corps
- 1st Construction Battalion
- 2nd CRT Battalion – formed from 127th Battalion (12th York Rangers), CEF
- 3rd CRT Battalion – 239th Battalion
- 4th CRT Battalion – Depot unit
- 5th CRT Battalion – Depot unit
- 6th CRT Battalion – 228th Battalion
- 7th CRT Battalion – 257th Battalion
- 8th CRT Battalion – 218th and 211th Battalions
- 9th CRT Battalion – 1st Pioneer
- 10th CRT Battalion – 256th Battalion
- 11th CRT Battalion – 3rd Labour Battalion
- 12th CRT Battalion – 2nd Labour Battalion
- 13th CRT Battalion – Depot unit
