= 162nd (Parry Sound) Battalion, CEF =

The 162nd (Parry Sound) Battalion, CEF was a unit in the Canadian Expeditionary Force during the First World War. Based in Parry Sound, Ontario, the unit began recruiting in late 1915 in that city. After sailing to England in November 1916, the battalion was absorbed into the 3rd and 4th Reserve Battalions on January 4, 1917. The 162nd Battalion, CEF had one Officer Commanding: Lieut-Col. J. M. Arthurs.

== Pre-War Militia ==
The Northern Pioneers, or the "23rd Regiment, The Northern Fusiliers" was formed on September 1, 1903. The Department of Militia and Defence authorized the formation in 1903 in order to fill the geographical gap between the 35th Simcoe Foresters in Huntsville and the 97th Algonquin Rifles in Sudbury. The Northern Pioneers headquarters in Parry Sound, embraced Muskoka-Parry Sound and as far north as North Bay. To cover the vast territory the regiment was sub-divided into various companies. Parry Sound, geographically speaking, was not an idealistic military district. Other regiments in more urban centres drilled in armouries throughout the year, the Northern Pioneers would get together in summer months for two-week training periods in regular army bases such as Niagara–on-the-Lake. To get to Parry Sound for the summer camp of 1912, the company from Loring had to travel west for 48 km on a wagon road through the bush to catch a CNR train at Salines (later called Drocourt).

=== Regiment command ===
When the regiment was first activated it was under the command of Lieutenant-Colonel John Henry Knifton who first came to Parry Sound 1895 as the new town clerk. He had 24 years of militia experience with the Queen's Own Rifles of Canada and another nine years with the 36th Peel Regiment. Lieutenant Colonel J.B. Miller was promoted Lieutenant Colonel to command the regiment on 15 September 1909. Miller was the President of the Parry Sound Lumber Company and was appointed Commanding Officer following the retirement of Knifton.

=== Regiment badge ===
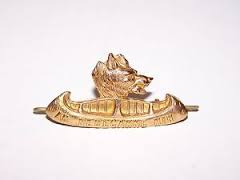
Northern Pioneers Collar Badge

Lieutenant-Colonel Knifton commissioned Duncan F. Macdonald to create a badge to represent the regiment. He tried to combine northern objects into the badge; a canoe is recognizable in the final product.

=== War is declared ===
War was declared on 4 August 1914. Hundreds of men were members of the Northern Pioneers, yet only a fraction, just a little over 100 members, enlisted in the Great War. The members who did join left Parry Sound on August 20, 1914, for Valcartier near Quebec City. The Northern Pioneers, being too small of a group to form a battalion, had to blend with the London-based 1st Canadian Infantry Battalion, 1st Brigade, 1st Canadian Contingent. Francis Pegahmagabow was one of the men who voluntarily enlisted in Parry Sound days after war had been declared and became a member of this 1st battalion.

=== After the war ===
The Northern Pioneers came back into existence after the war and remained in existence until 1936 when it was absorbed into The Algonquin Regiment, based out of North Bay.

== The 162nd Battalion ==
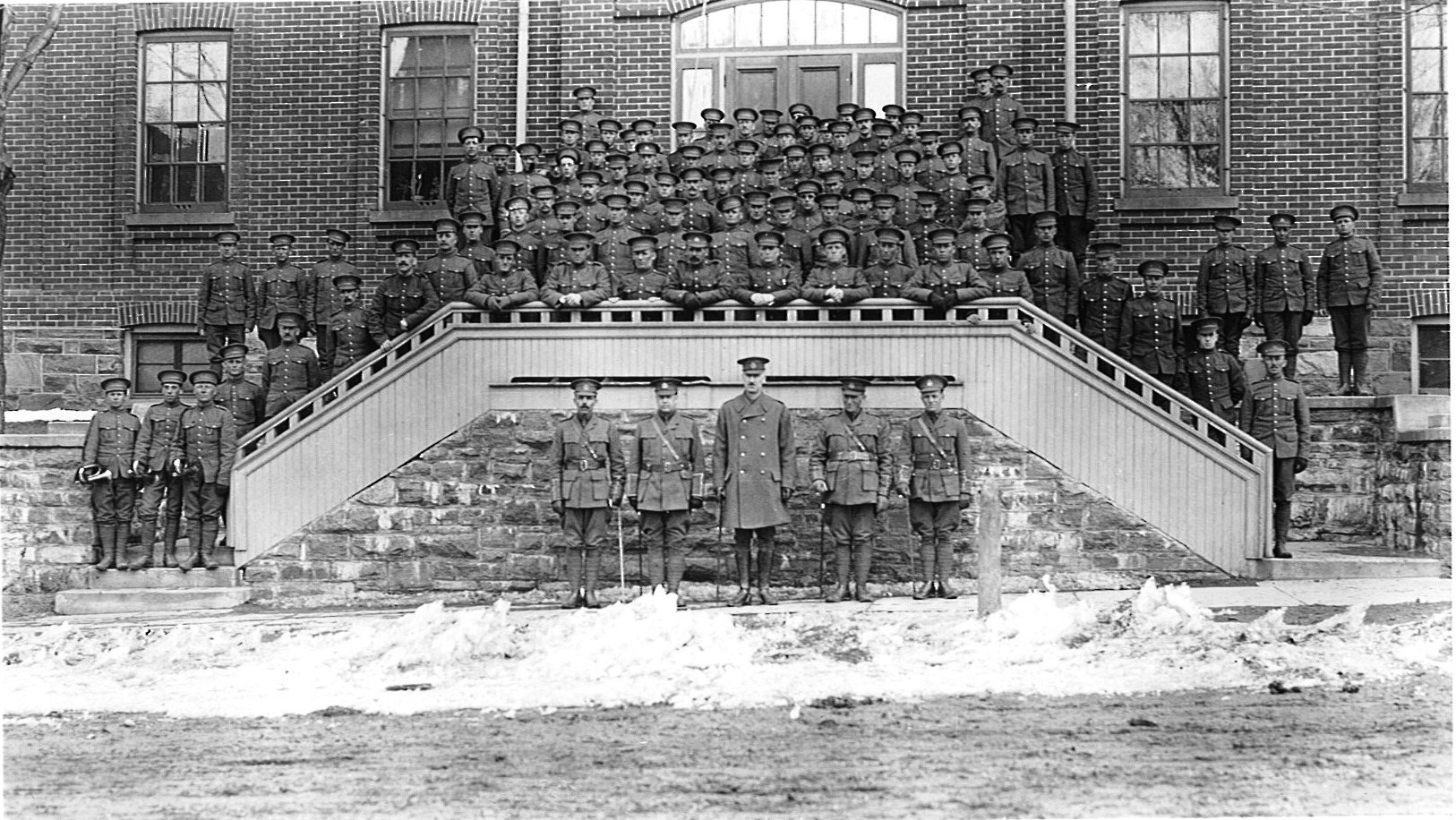
The 162nd Battalion on the Court House steps in Parry Sound Ontario, 1916

A year into the First World War the Prime Minister of Canada, Robert Borden, decided the Canadian forces were to be doubled in size to half a million soldiers. This number was going to be difficult to garner since the total population of Canada at the time was around 8 million. A plan was devised by Minister of Militia, Sam Hughes, to turn each electoral district into a battalion area. The thought process was that more people would be willing to enlist if they knew they would be going overseas with their friends and neighbours. The plan worked and on 2 December 1915 the 23rd Regiment in Parry Sound was authorized to raise the 162nd Battalion.

=== Battalion Numbers and Insignia ===
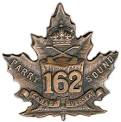
The pin given to the 162nd Battalion.

Numbers and insignia were randomly drawn for each battalion; Parry Sound drew 162 whereas the neighbouring Muskoka drew 122. The 162nd Battalion badge was a pair of axes parked in a pine stump. The battalion referred to themselves as the "Timber Wolves from Parry Sound" due to their lineage tracing back to the 23rd Northern Pioneers, whose badge had the head of a wolf on it.

=== Call to Arms and Absorption ===
Over 700 men enlisted and went to war. On 11 August 1916 the Battalion made its way to Camp Niagara-on-the-Lake for advanced training. On October 31, 1916, the ranks in training in Niagara sailed from Halifax on the Caronia. The 162nd Battalion existed for a short time though. They operated out of Canada from 2 December 1915 to November 1, 1916. They then went to Europe but were only a whole group from 11 November 1916 to 4 January 1917. From that point on they were broken up and absorbed into the 3rd and 4th battalion, used as reinforcement for the Canadian Corps. out in the field.

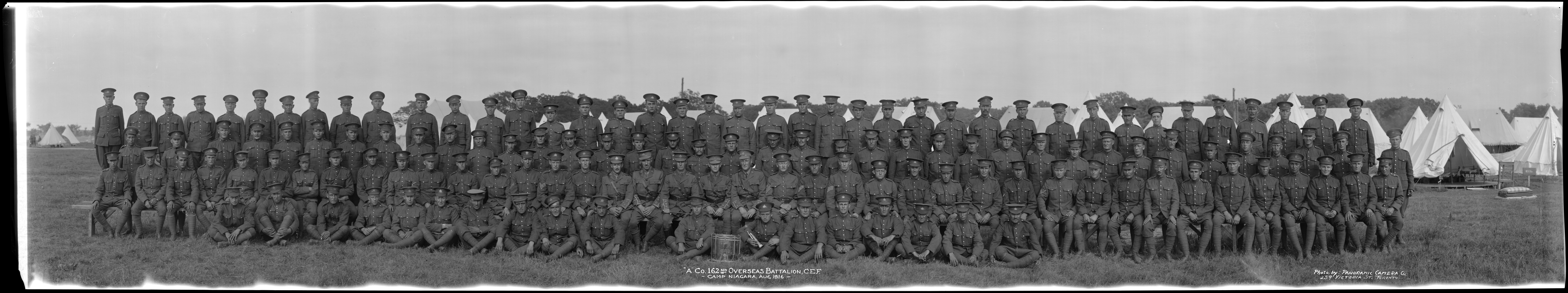
The 162nd Battalion in training at the new camp in Niagara-on-the-Lake
