= 228th Battalion (Northern Fusiliers), CEF =

228th Battalion, CEF; 6th Battalion, Canadian Railway Troops, CEF
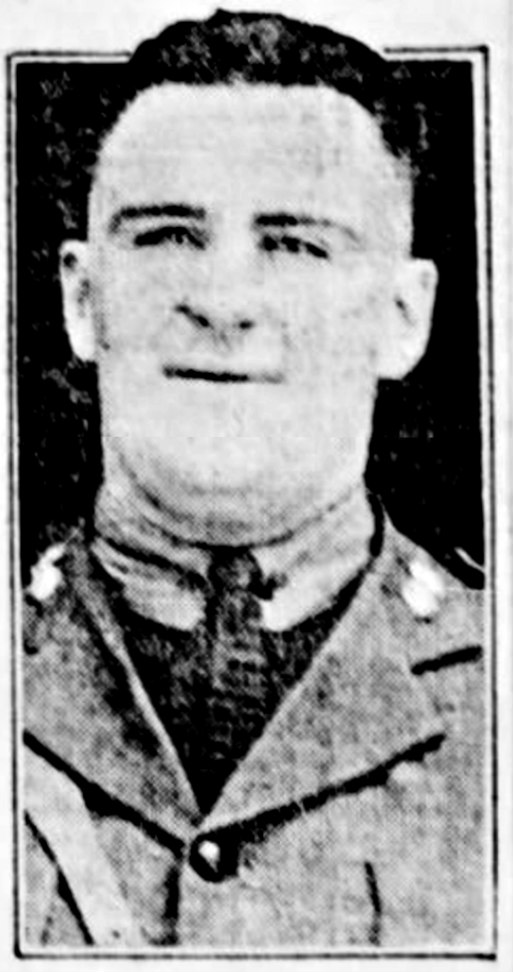
- Howard McNamara of the 228th Battalion
- Active: 1916–1920
- Disbanded: 1920
- Country: Canada
- Branch: Canadian Expeditionary Force
- Type: Infantry 1916–1917; Railway construction 1917–1920
- Part of: Corps of Canadian Railway Troops 1917–1920
- Mobilization headquarters: North Bay, Ontario

Commanders
- Commanding officer: LCol Archie Earchman

The 228th (Northern Fusiliers) Battalion, CEF was a unit in the Canadian Expeditionary Force during the First World War. Based in North Bay, Ontario, the unit began recruiting in early 1916 in Nipissing and Sudbury. After sailing to England in December 1916, the battalion became the 6th Battalion, Canadian Railway Troops, on 8 March 1917. The 228th Battalion had one officer commanding: Lieutenant-Colonel Archie Earchman.

The battalion established the Toronto 228th Battalion hockey team, captained by Howard McNamara, which played in the 1916–17 NHA season. The squad, playing in their khaki military uniforms, proved very popular, and was third in league standings with a 6–4 record when they dropped out of the league upon being ordered overseas. A scandal arose when hockey stars Eddie Oatman and Gordon Meeking were discharged, both subsequently claiming they had been paid bonuses and promised commissions to play hockey for the 228th.

The perpetuation of the battalion was assigned in 1920 to the 2nd Battalion of the Algonquin Rifles, a regiment that, after several redesignations, is now called The Algonquin Regiment (Northern Pioneers).
