= 239th Battalion, CEF =

The 239th Battalion, CEF was a unit in the Canadian Expeditionary Force during the First World War. Based in Camp Valcartier, the unit began recruiting in the Spring of 1916, seeking experienced railway men. After sailing to England in December 1916, the battalion was absorbed into the Canadian Railway Construction Corps and became the 3rd Battalion, Canadian Railway Troops. The 239th Battalion, CEF had one Officer Commanding: Lieut-Col. J. B. L. MacDonald.
