= 141st (Rainy River District) Battalion (Border Bull Moose), CEF =

141st "Overseas" Battalion, CEF
- Active: 1915–1917
- Disbanded: 1917
- Country: Canada
- Branch: Canadian Expeditionary Force
- Type: Infantry
- Mobilization headquarters: Fort Frances, Ontario
- Nickname(s): Border Bull Moose
- Battle honours: The Great War, 1917

Commanders
- Current commander: LCol D. C. McKenzie

The 141st Battalion, CEF was a unit in the Canadian Expeditionary Force during the First World War.

== History ==
Based in Fort Frances, Ontario, the unit began recruiting in late 1915 in Rainy River District of northern Ontario. After sailing to England in April 1917, the battalion was absorbed into the 18th Reserve Battalion on May 7, 1917.

The 141st Battalion had one officer commanding: Lieutenant-Colonel D. C. McKenzie.

In 1929, the battalion was awarded the theatre of war honour "The Great War, 1917".

== Perpetuation ==
The perpetuation of the battalion was assigned in 1920 to the Rainy River and Kenora Regiment. A year later in 1921, the perpetuation was reassigned to the Lake Superior Regiment, which is now named the Lake Superior Scottish Regiment.

- 1920–1921: 1st Battalion (141st Battalion, CEF), The Rainy River and Kenora Regiment
- 1921–1936: 2nd Battalion (141st Battalion, CEF), The Lake Superior Regiment
- 1936–1949: The Lake Superior Regiment
- 1949–present: The Lake Superior Scottish Regiment

== See also ==
- List of infantry battalions in the Canadian Expeditionary Force
