= 96th District of Algoma Battalion of Rifles =

- Active: 1885-1896
- Country: Canada
- Branch: Canadian Militia
- Type: Rifles
- Role: Infantry
- Size: Between 4-6 Companies across Northern Ontario
- Part of: Non-Permanent Active Militia
- Garrison/HQ: Port Arthur, Ontario

The 96th District of Algoma Battalion of Rifles was a short-lived rifle regiment of the Non-Permanent Active Militia of the Canadian Militia (now the Canadian Army). First formed in 1886 with its Headquarters in Port Arthur, Ontario (now the city of Thunder Bay, Ontario), the battalion had companies across Northern Ontario. In 1896, the 96th Battalion was disbanded. The battalion is considered a predecessor unit to The Lake Superior Scottish Regiment.

== History ==
=== The Port Arthur Rifle Company ===
Before 1885, there were efforts in the Thunder Bay District region of Northern Ontario to form a volunteer unit of the Canadian Militia for some years. Things would change however with the outbreak of the North-West Rebellion in the Spring of 1885, troops from Eastern Canada were rushed through the small town of Port Arthur (now part of Thunder Bay) along the head of Lake Superior over the near-completed CPR line on their way out west to suppress the uprising. This created a patriotic stir in the small port community and as a result local banker, Samuel Wellington Ray, proposed the formation of a local militia company of riflemen.

On 24 April 1885, Ray received a telegram from the Minister of Militia and Defence Adolphe-Philippe Caron authorizing him to form the new unit which read: "I am disposed to authorize full company for the time the disturbance will last. They would have to procure their own equipment and arms as we could not supply them until navigation opens." An Independent Company of Rifles designated as The Port Arthur Rifle Company was soon formed with Ray commissioned as a Captain in the Non-Permanent Active Militia and appointed in command of the new company. Local interest in the unit remained high even after the western rebellion had been put down.

=== 96th District of Algoma Battalion of Rifles ===
On 10 December 1886, the Provisional Battalion of Rifles was authorized for service with the Port Arthur Rifle Company forming part and neighboring companies were authorized in Fort William, Rat Portage (now Kenora) and Gore Bay, Ontario. Ray would be given command of the new unit with the rank of Major.

On 29 April 1887, the battalion was Redesignated as the 96th District of Algoma Battalion of Rifles and had additional companies authorized in Bruce Mines, Thessalon and Sault Ste. Marie. However, in June 1892, the eastern boundary of Military District No. 10 to which the 96th Battalion belonged too was redrawn further east to the Nipigon River and with Sault Ste. Marie now in the jurisdiction of Military District No. 2, the Sault St. Marie Company was separated from the 96th Battalion and became an independent militia company again along with the Gore Bay and Thessalon companies. That same year, command of the 96th Battalion passed from Major Ray to Major T.H. Elliot.

=== Disbandment & Legacy ===
During their existence, the officers and men of the 96th Battalion drilled and practiced musketry and were known far and wide for their marksmanship. However, since the time the battalion had been established, the unit suffered from a lack of adequate drill sheds and armouries for its companies in the region and had never even received any authorized annual drill from the Militia Department in Ottawa, so the unit as a whole had never trained together, but only at the individual company level. By the mid-1890s however, local interest in the unit was waning and the ranks dwindling so much the unit had all but disintegrated. Finally on 22 August 1896, the battalion was disbanded from the Canadian Militia just short of its 10th anniversary in service with a General Order dated on 28 August 1896, stating: "This Battalion having become non-effective, is struck off the strength of the Militia 22nd August, 1896."

The Sault Ste. Marie Independent Company would survive as an independent unit until 1 July 1900, when it became the nucleus of a new unit raised in Sault Ste, Marie, the 97th Regiment of Rifles - today The Algonquin Regiment (Northern Pioneers). In 1913, the company in Sault Ste. Marie was transferred again to a new unit the 51st Regiment (Soo Rifles) – today the 49th Field Artillery Regiment, RCA.

Various attempts over the next couple years to raise a new militia battalion in the Thunder Bay District would be unsuccessful until 3 July 1905, when the 96th Lake Superior Regiment was organized with its Headquarters once again in Port Arthur.

== Organization ==
=== Provisional Battalion of Rifles (10 December 1886) ===
- Regimental Headquarters (Port Arthur, ON)
- No. 1 Company (Port Arthur, ON) (first raised on 24 April 1885, as the Port Arthur Rifle Company)
- No. 2 Company (Fort William, ON)
- No. 3 Company (Rat Portage, ON)
- No. 4 Company (Gore Bay, ON and Bruce Mines, ON) (later consolidated on 29 April 1887 at Gore Bay)

=== 96th District of Algoma Battalion of Rifles (29 April 1887) ===
- No. 1 Company (Port Arthur, ON)
- No. 2 Company (Fort William, ON)
- No. 3 Company (Rat Portage, ON)
- No. 4 Company (Gore Bay, ON) (later disbanded on 18 January 1896)
- No. 5 Company (Bruce Mines, ON; raised on 29 April 1887; moved 18 September 1887 to Little Current, ON; moved 21 October 1887 to Manitowaning, ON; moved 31 May 1887 to Thessalon, ON; disbanded on 18 January 1896)
- No. 6 Company (Sault Ste. Marie, ON) (raised on 31 May 1889; became independent in 1892; transferred on 1 July 1900 as No. 1 Company, 97th Regiment of Rifles)
