= 119th Division =

In military terms, 119th Division or 119th Infantry Division may refer to:

== Infantry divisions ==
- 119th Division (People's Republic of China)
- 119th Infantry Division (German Empire)
- 119th Division (Imperial Japanese Army)
- 119th Guards Rifle Division, Soviet Union
- 119th Rifle Division, Soviet Union

== Aviation divisions ==
- 119th Fighter Aviation Division, Soviet Union

== See also ==
- List of military divisions by number
- 119th Brigade (disambiguation)
- 119th Regiment (disambiguation)
- 119th Squadron (disambiguation)
- 119th (disambiguation)
