= Fred Loft =

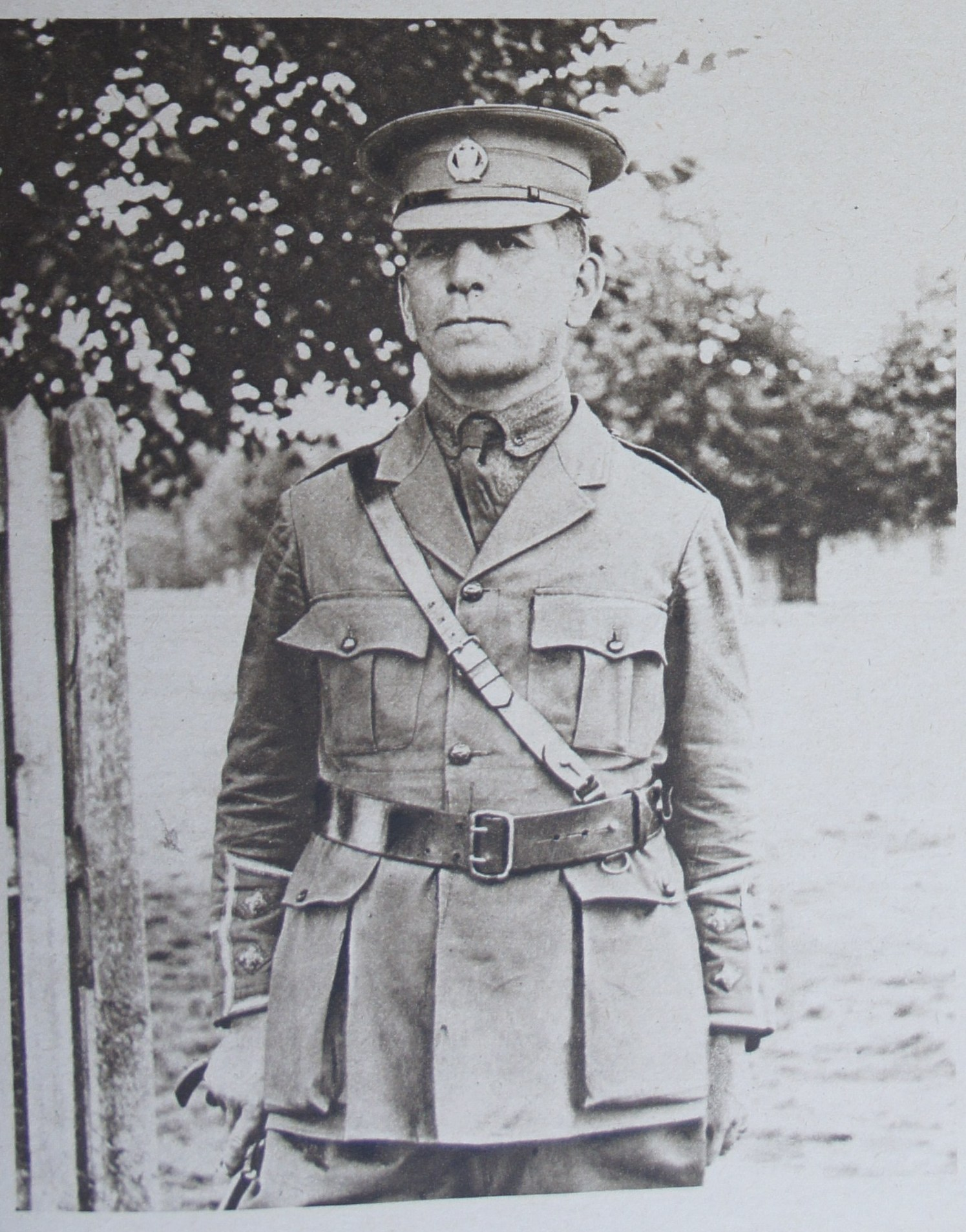
1917 in England.

Frederick Ogilvie Loft (Mohawk: Onondeyoh, also known as F. O. Loft or Fred O. Loft; February 3, 1861 – 1934) was a Mohawk activist who founded the League of Indians of Canada. He has been counted among "the great Indian activists of the first half of the twentieth century" according to Peter Kulchyski.

He was also a World War I veteran and was active in encouraging recruitment. He stood nearly 6 feet (1.8 m) tall and weighed 170 pounds (77 kg).

== Early life ==
Frederick Loft (Also known as Onondeyoh, which means "Beautiful Mountain" in Mohawk) was born in Six Nations of the Grand River to Christian Mohawk parents. Both parents spoke fluently in English and Mohawk, and was strongly encouraged by his parents to seek an education at an early age. His education included high school and completing the training necessary to be a bookkeeper. However, unable to find work within his trained field, he instead worked numerous jobs but was most well known as a reporter for the Brantford Expositor. While only working for less than six months with the paper, Loft became greatly interested in Indian Affairs and greatly expressed a strong liberal attitude to the subject. He brought this view with him to Toronto, Ontario, Canada, which, unlike Montreal and Vancouver, had no neighboring reserves and had fewer dealings with the subject. Pushing for stronger, more autonomous First Nations groups in Toronto, he proposed unions between the Ojibwa and Iroquois people to the Toronto Globe but saw nothing for his efforts. This did not deter Loft from actively working in politics, and in Toronto, he sat in a unique position of being educated, fluent in English and coming from a well-off family; he could continue to assert himself, and gain valued friends. Prior to the First World War, Loft did not achieve a political position of high ranking, but acquired many friends, met his wife Affa Geara and became well known to many Indian relations groups and Indian Reserves. He served in the 37th and 109th Regiments of the Canadian Militia prior to enrolling in the 256th Canadian Railway Construction Battalion of the Canadian Expeditionary Force in February 1917 as a lieutenant. He served France with 71 Company Canadian Forestry Corps from August 1917 to January 1918. He was then posted back to England and returned to Canada in April 1918.

== Postwar efforts and death ==
With the First World War ending in 1918, unlike the rest of the veterans who had served, Indian veterans were dealt with through Indian Affairs, which couldn't properly fund the returning men. It was here that Loft pushed the concept of the League of Indians forwards, being a prominent member and instrumental in its creation. Loft hoped that with the combined force of the Indians within Canada, they could strive together and not only protect their rights from the government, but also work with it to better achieve unity between the state and Indians. While not acknowledging or denouncing the subject of integration of Indians into Canadian society, Loft's desires clearly saw that being reclusive was actively working against their rights. Whilst he had support from key members in Indian society, it was clear that after the First World War that it was Loft nearly upholding the League by himself, and constantly having to work against Indian Affairs. The department of Indian Affairs repeatedly refused his desires to speak directly to Parliament, and did not pay for the work that the League was attempting to do. It was abundantly clear that the league was solely tied to Loft, as when his health began to falter the league did as well. In a last attempt to circumvent Indian Affairs altogether, he once again met failure and quickly fell ill, with the League failing with his health. Loft, who died in Toronto in 1934 after his health had rapidly deteriorated, lived on through his daughters. His large attempts to bring rights to Indians, and the dream of making the League of Indians a capable force largely collapsed without his efforts to support it. As John L. Taylor claims:

"F.O. Loft was undoubtedly a man born before his time. His resources were insufficient to sustain and enlarge the organization he envisaged. He was nearly sixty when he began and he had to maintain full-time employment to support his family. In any case, one person could not have done all that was required."

Loft's dreams were much too large for one sole individual to carry forward, and while his own league failed, it spurred on later attempts to achieve similar ideals. It acted as a forerunner for the Assembly of First Nations in 1978 and many other minor provincial Native organizations.

== Legacy ==
In 2020, Loft was one of eight finalists considered for the new face of the $5 polymer bills in Canada.
