= 119th Brigade =

119th Brigade may refer to:

- 119th Motorized Infantry Brigade (People's Republic of China)
- 119th Brigade (Croatia)
- 119th Territorial Defense Brigade, a unit of the Ukrainian Territorial Defense Forces
- 119th Brigade (United Kingdom)
- 119th Brigade, Royal Field Artillery, of the United Kingdom
- 119th Helicopter Brigade, of Yugoslavia, and later Serbia

== See also ==
- 119th Division (disambiguation)
- 119th Regiment (disambiguation)
