= Charles Henry Byce =

Canadian soldier (1916–1994)

Charles DCM MM
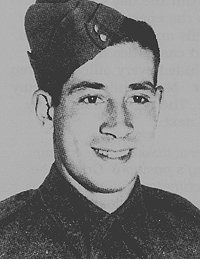
- Born: March 9, 1916; Chapleau, Ontario
- Died: November 30, 1994 (aged 78); Newmarket, Ontario
- Military career
- Allegiance: Canada
- Branch: Canadian Army
- Service years: 1940-1945
- Rank: Sergeant
- Unit: The Lake Superior Regiment (Motor)
- Conflicts: Second World War
- Awards: Distinguished Conduct Medal; Military Medal

Charles Henry Byce DCM MM (March 9, 1916 – November 20, 1994) was a Cree-Canadian soldier and one of the most highly decorated Canadian World War II veterans.

== Biography ==
Byce was born on March 9, 1916, in Chapleau, Ontario, to Louisa Saylors, of Cree descent from Moose Factory, Ontario, and Henry Charles Byce of Westmeath, Ontario. His father was a World War I veteran who had been awarded a Distinguished Conduct Medal and a French Médaille militaire. When he was a teenager, Byce moved to Port Arthur, Ontario. Despite his relatively small frame, Byce, who was 5 foot 6 and 125 pounds, joined the Canadian Army in the early 1940s, becoming a member of the Lake Superior Regiment, now known as the Lake Superior Scottish Regiment.

On January 21, 1945, Byce and twenty-three members of the Lake Superior Regiment crossed the Maas River by row-boat with the goal of entering enemy territory in order to obtain information from German soldiers about enemy units. As part of the mission, Byce led a team of five men tasked with securing cover for those undertaking reconnaissance duties. Shortly after landing, the reconnaissance team was fired upon from three German positions. Byce took out two with grenades and was able to secure intelligence from a German prisoner prior to retreating. He was later awarded a Military Medal in recognition of the achievement.

In the early morning of March 2, 1945, the Lake Superior Regiment departed with directions to take over a set of buildings located south of Hochwald Forest. The buildings were quickly secured, but their location was discovered as the sun rose. The discovery of their location resulted in an enemy bombardment of shells and mortar. The attack destroyed all available tanks and yielded numerous casualties, including the death of every officer and the company commander, at which time Acting Sergeant Byce took command. With enemy Tiger tanks approaching, he destroyed one with an anti-tank gun and focused on sniping approaching enemy infantry in order to allow for the gathering and retreat of surviving servicemen.

Byce was awarded a Distinguished Conduct Medal for bravery in recognition of his actions, becoming one of 162 Canadian servicemen to receive the honour during the war. The citation noted, "The magnificent courage and fighting spirit displayed by this NCO when faced with almost insuperable odds are beyond all praise. His gallant stand, without adequate weapons and with a bare handful of men against hopeless odds will remain, for all time, an outstanding example to all ranks of the Regiment." In a 2011 column, Peter Worthington acknowledged that some have questioned why Byce was awarded the Distinguished Conduct Medal rather than the Victoria Cross, pointing to his Cree heritage as a possible explanation. Worthington, however, noted that a "more plausible reason was that the operation he was involved in was not a success, but a narrowly averted disaster." In addition to the two Decorations, he received five service medals for his service in the North West Europe theatre of war, The 1939-1945 Star, The France and Germany Star, The Defence Medal, The Canadian Volunteer Service Medal with Overseas Clasp, and The War Medal 1939-1945.

Following the war, Byce moved to Espanola, Ontario, with his wife Frances, where he worked at a pulp-and-paper mill until his retirement in 1975. He and Frances raised seven children.

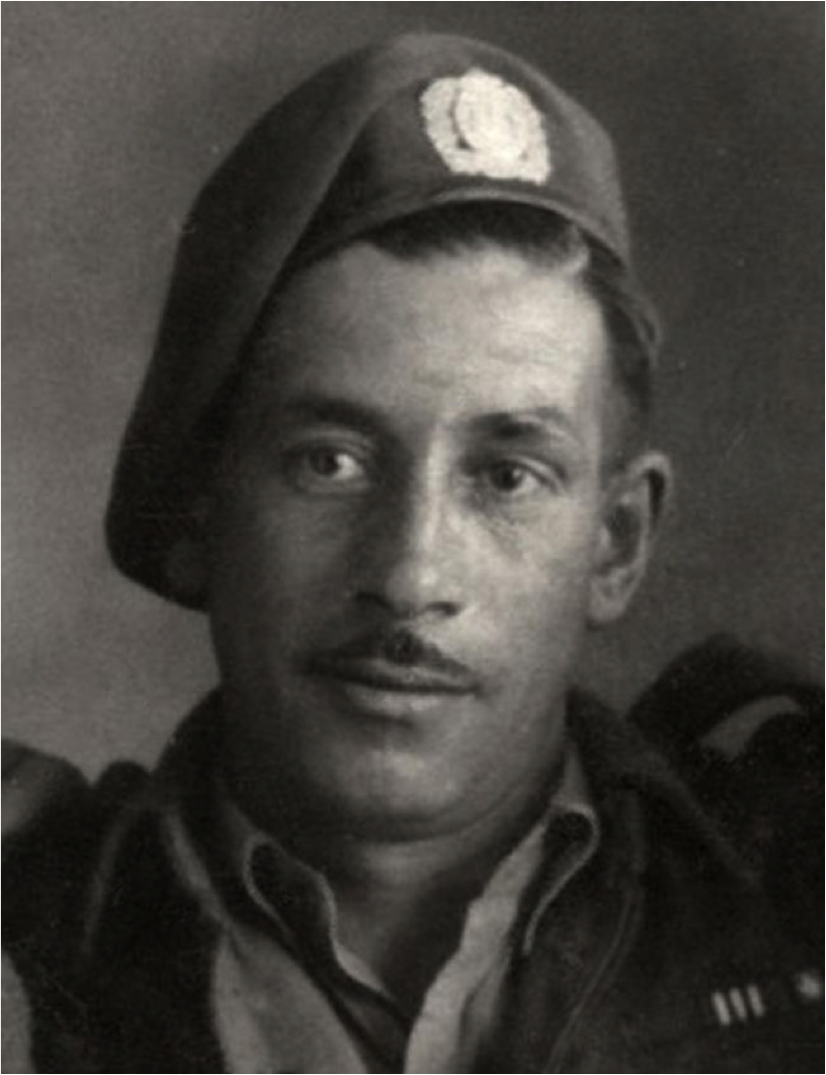
Photograph of Sergeant Charles Henry Byce - Lake Superior Regiment (Motor) - Canadian Army c.1945

== Legacy ==
In 2008, Byce's family donated the medals of Byce and his father to Canada during a ceremony at the National War Museum. Following the ceremony both men were inducted into the Canadian Veterans Hall of Valour.

A statue of Byce was unveiled in Chapleau on September 17, 2016, to commemorate his service. Sculpted by Sudbury artist Tyler Fauvelle, the bronze-and-granite statue features Byce in military uniform accompanied by moose antlers as an acknowledgement of his Cree ancestry.

== Honours and awards ==
| Description | Notes |
|---|---|
| Distinguished Conduct Medal (DCM) | |
| Military Medal (MM) | |
| 1939-1945 Star | |
| France and Germany Star | |
| Defence Medal | |
| Canadian Volunteer Service Medal | With Overseas Clasp |
| War Medal 1939-1945 | |
