= 122nd (Muskoka) Battalion, CEF =

The 122nd Overseas Battalion, CEF was a unit in the Canadian Expeditionary Force during the First World War. Based in Huntsville, Ontario & Bracebridge, Ontario the unit began recruiting in late 1915 in the Muskoka district. After sailing to England in June 1917, the battalion was absorbed into the Canadian Forestry Depot on June 9, 1917. The 122nd Battalion, CEF had one Officer Commanding: Lieut-Col.D. M. Grant.

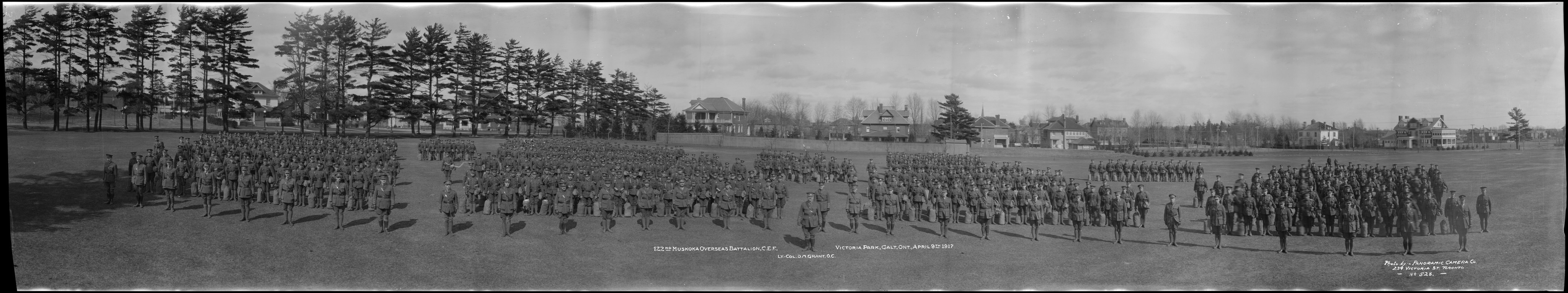
Photo

The battalion had four different versions of their cap badge.

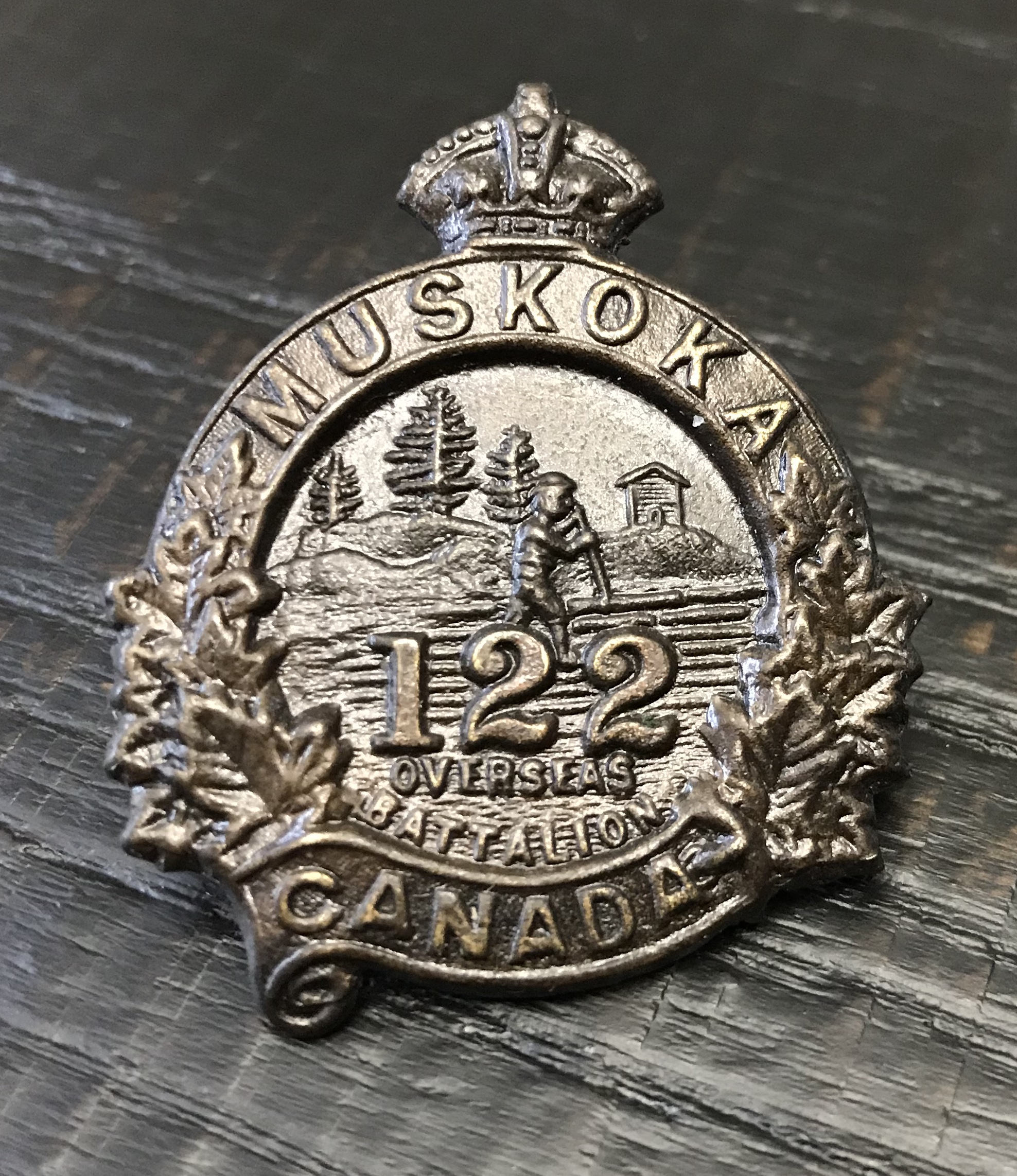
Log Rider

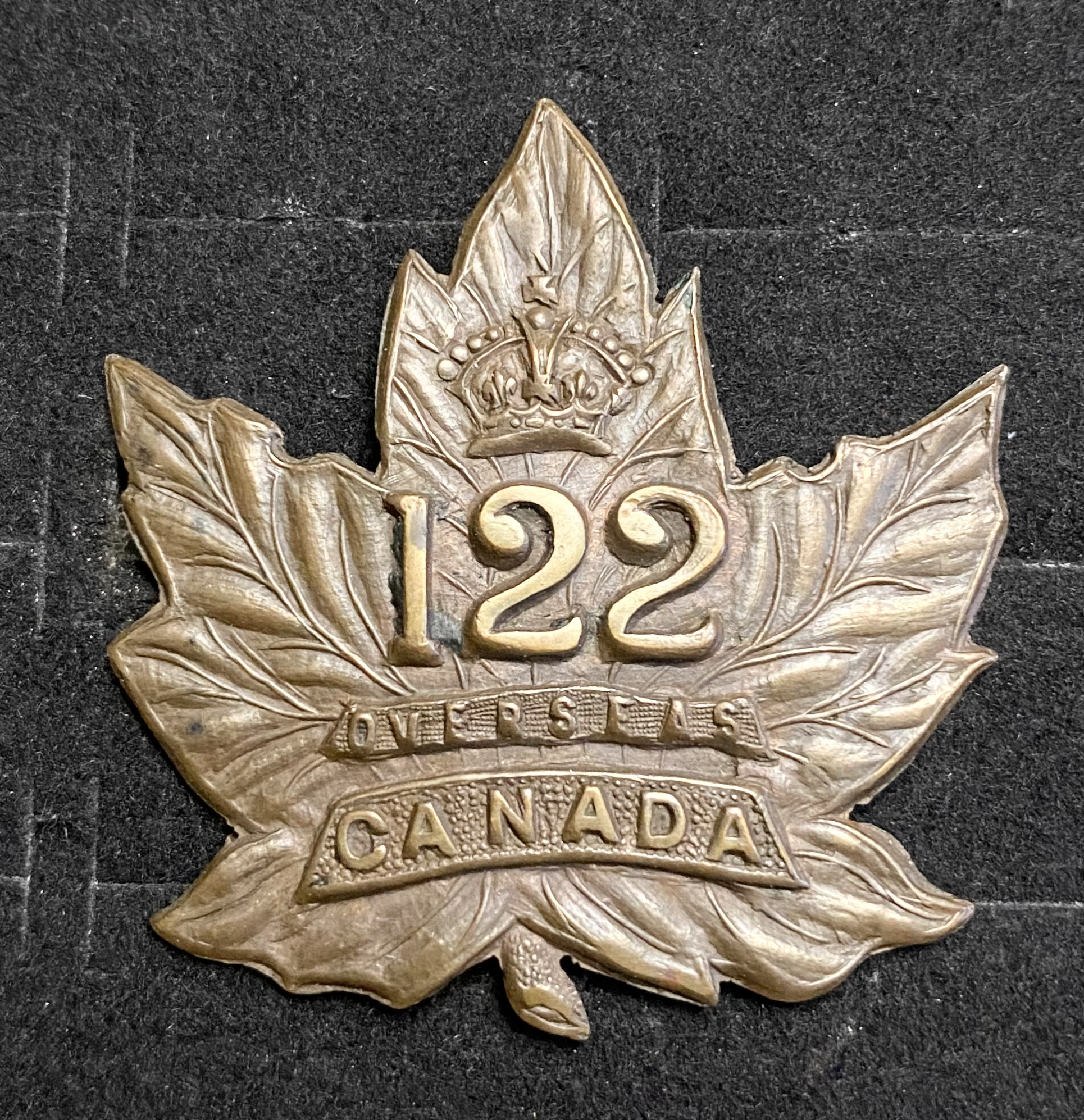
Maple Leaf type 1

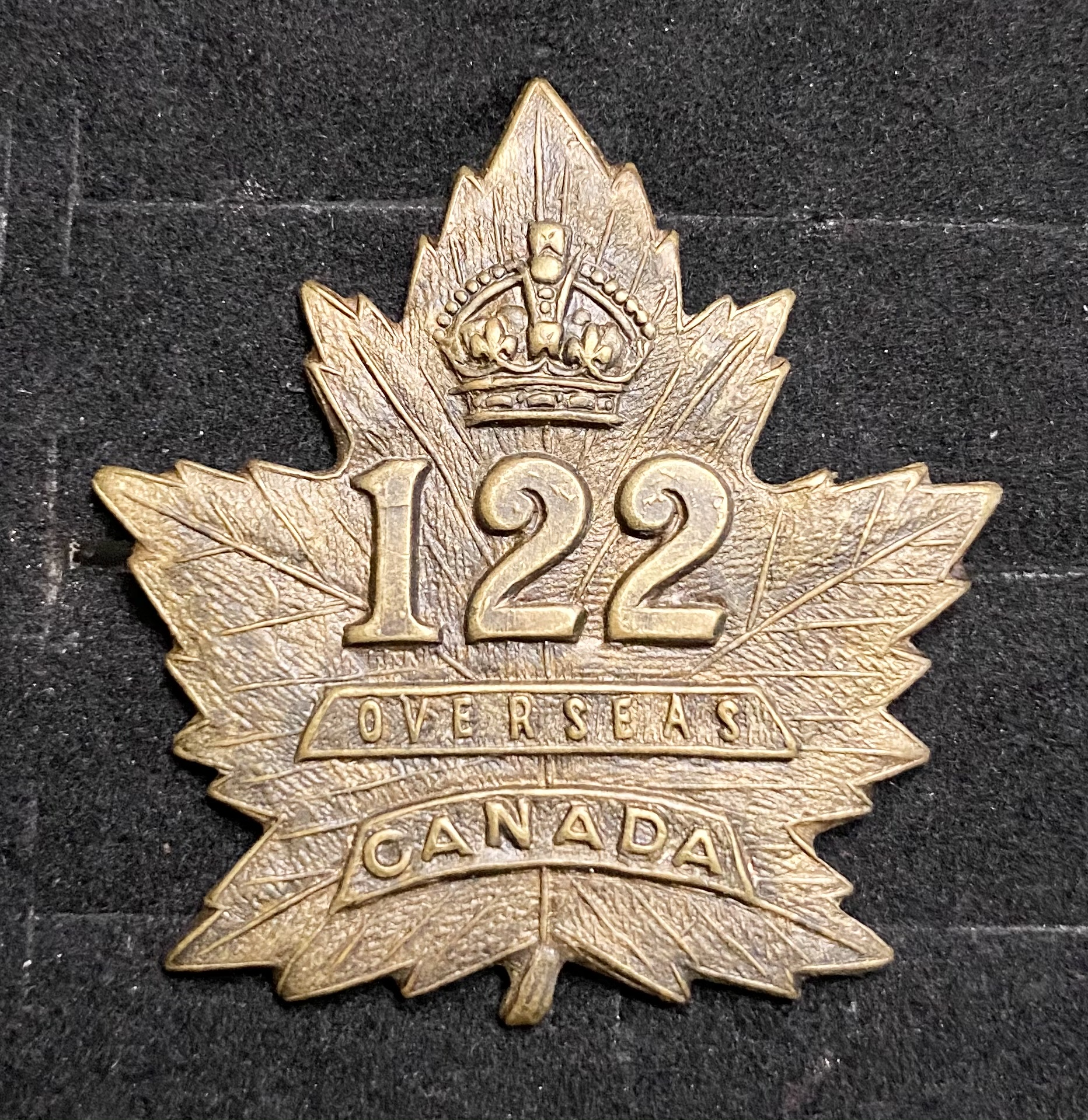
Maple Leaf Type 2

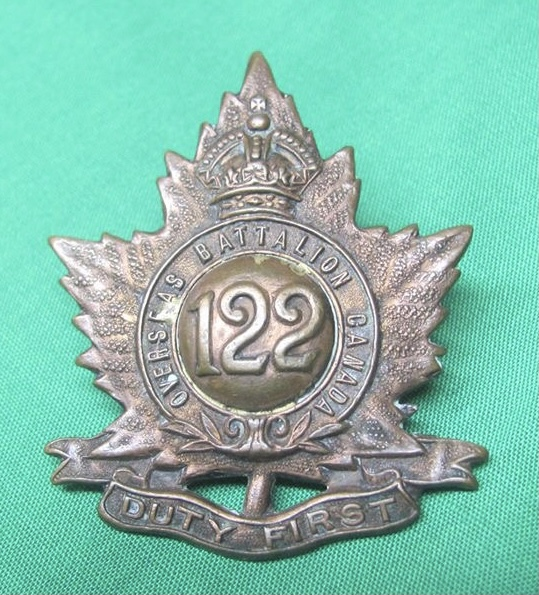
Maple Leaf Type 3

== Battalion Colours ==
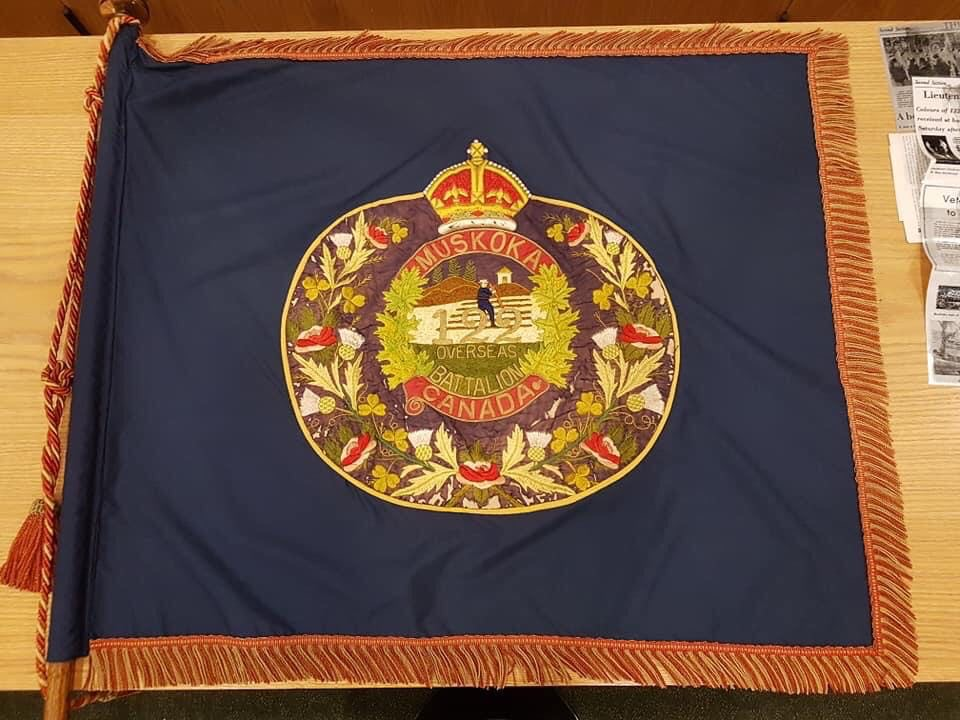

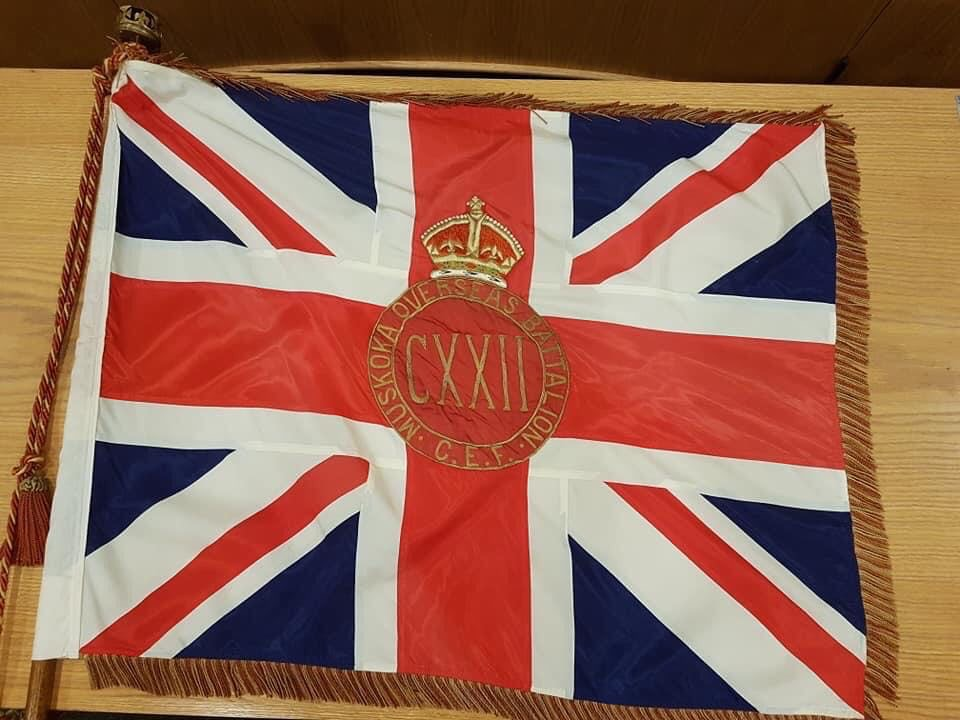
