= 119th (Algoma) Battalion, CEF =

Canadian Expeditionary Force unit

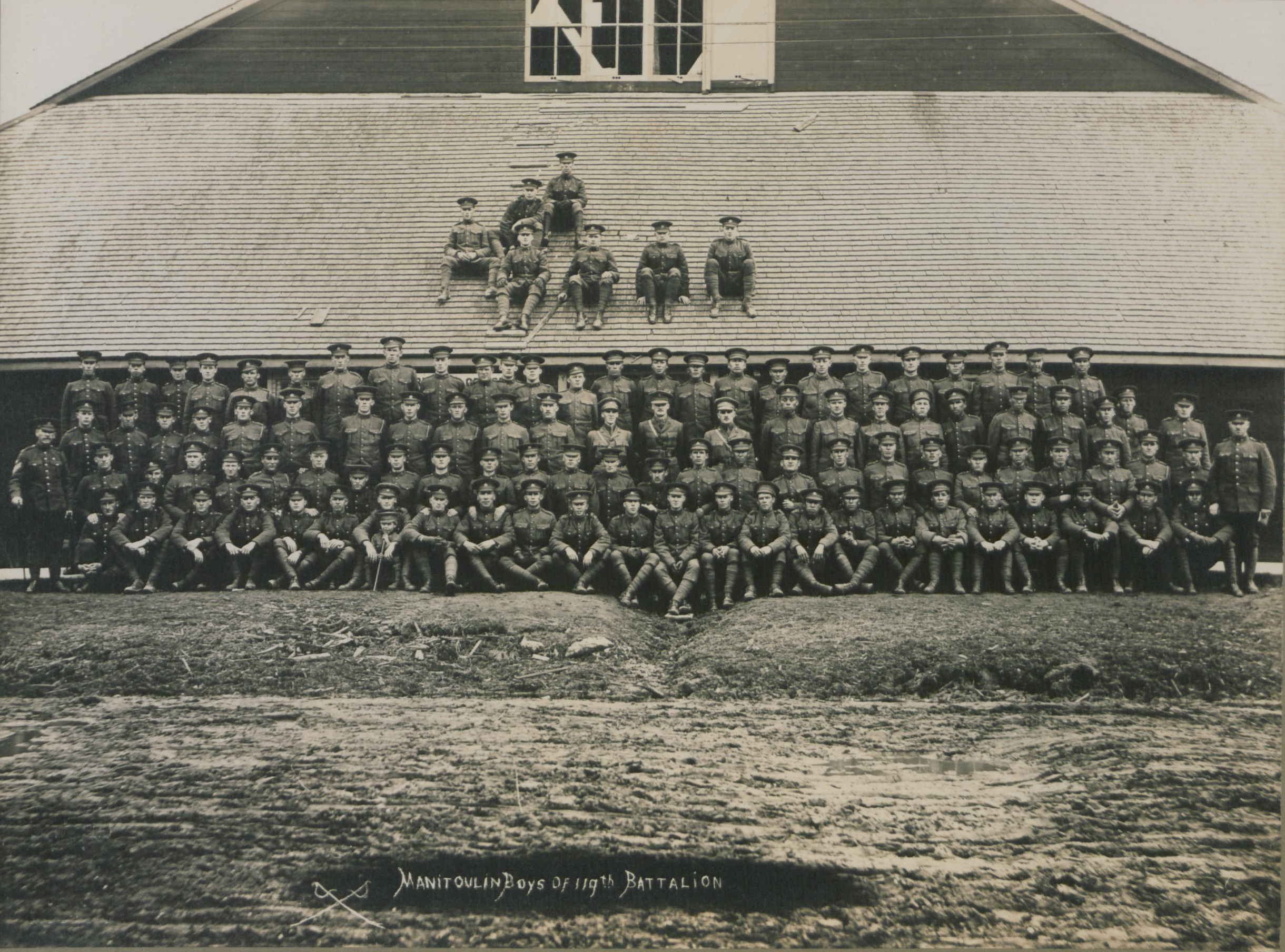
Manitoulin Boys of the 119th Battalion

The 119th (Algoma) Battalion, CEF was a unit in the Canadian Expeditionary Force during the First World War.

== History ==
Based in Sault Ste. Marie, Ontario, the unit began recruiting in late 1915 in the Algoma District and on Manitoulin Island. After sailing to England in August 1916, the battalion was absorbed into the 8th Reserve Battalion (Central Ontario) on April 16, 1918.

The 119th (Algoma) Battalion, CEF had one Officer Commanding: Lieutenant Colonel Thomas Percival Turton Rowland (1875–1952).

Private Dominic Odjig 1895-1980 (Regimental # 754710) was father of artist Daphne Odjig.

The lineage of 119th is perpetuated by the 49th Field Artillery Regiment, RCA.
