= 227th (Sudbury-Manitoulin-Algoma) Battalion (Men o' the North), CEF =

The 227th Battalion, CEF was a unit in the Canadian Expeditionary Force during the First World War. Based in Sault Ste. Marie, Ontario and Camp Borden, the unit began recruiting in early 1916 on Manitoulin Island and in Algoma. After sailing to England in April 1917, the battalion was absorbed into the 8th Reserve Battalion on April 22, 1917. The 227th Battalion, CEF had one Officer Commanding: Lieut-Col. C. H. LeP. Jones.
