= Canadian Efficiency Decoration =

Canadian military award

Efficiency Decoration
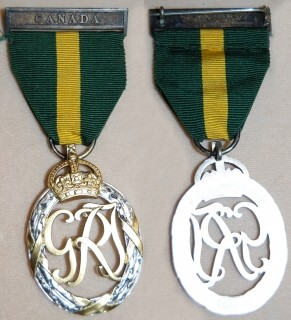
- Obverse and reverse with the cypher of King George VI (first version)
- Type: Long service decoration
- Awarded for: Twenty years service until 1949; Twelve years service from 1949
- Presented by: Canada
- Eligibility: Officers of the Non-Permanent Active Militia, RCAF Auxiliary and Reserve
- Post-nominals: ED
- Clasps: Awarded for 6 years additional service
- Status: Superseded by the Canadian Forces' Decoration
- Established: 23 September 1931

Highlights
- Total: 3,700
- Ribbon of the decoration

Precedence
- Equivalent: Canadian Forces' Decoration

The Canadian Efficiency Decoration (ED) was a Canadian military award given to officers of the Non-Permanent Active Militia, RCAF Auxiliary and Reserve who completed twenty years of meritorious military service. Similar Efficiency Decorations were also awarded by other Commonwealth countries. A bar was issued for an additional 20 years of meritorious service. Approximately 3,700 medals were issued.

Time spent in war service counted double towards the 20 year requirement and time spent in the ranks counted as half. The award was superseded by the Air Efficiency Award for members of the RCAF Auxiliary and Reserve in 1942. Eligible members who entered the Canadian Forces before 1 September 1939 continued to be eligible for award of the Canadian Efficiency Decoration and bars to the decoration. Members who had joined after that time were eligible for the Canadian Forces' Decoration, which superseded the Canadian Efficiency Decoration, on its establishment in 1949.
