= Saskatchewan Mounted Rifles =

The Saskatchewan Mounted Rifles
- Active: 1908–1936
- Country: Canada
- Branch: Canadian Militia
- Type: Light cavalry
- Role: Cavalry
- Size: One regiment
- Part of: Non-Permanent Active Militia
- Garrison/HQ: Lloydminster, Saskatchewan
- Engagements: First World War
- Battle honours: See #Battle Honours

The Saskatchewan Mounted Rifles was a cavalry regiment of the Non-Permanent Active Militia of the Canadian Militia (now the Canadian Army). First formed in 1908 as the Saskatchewan Light Horse, the regiment was later redesignated that year as the 22nd Saskatchewan Light Horse and again in 1920 as The Saskatchewan Mounted Rifles. In 1911, the regiment transferred two of its squadrons (in Saskatoon and Allan) to the newly formed 29th Light Horse. In 1936, the regiment was amalgamated with the 16th Canadian Light Horse to form the 16th/22nd Saskatchewan Horse (now part of The North Saskatchewan Regiment).

== Lineage ==
- Originated on 2 March 1908, in Lloydminster, Saskatchewan, as the Saskatchewan Light Horse.
- Redesignated on 1 April 1908, as the 22nd Saskatchewan Light Horse.
- Redesignated on 15 March 1920, as The Saskatchewan Mounted Rifles.
- Amalgamated on 15 December 1936, with the 16th Canadian Light Horse to form the 16th/22nd Saskatchewan Horse.

== Perpetuations ==
- 1st Regiment, Canadian Mounted Rifles
- 9th Regiment, Canadian Mounted Rifles
- 10th Regiment, Canadian Mounted Rifles

== History ==
=== The Great War ===
At the start of the First World War, the 22nd Saskatchewan Light Horse was one of 6 cavalry regiments from across Western Canada to provide detachments that helped recruit the 6th Battalion (Fort Garrys), CEF for service with the first contingent of the Canadian Expeditionary Force. The other detachments were provided from the 34th Fort Garry Horse (now The Fort Garry Horse), the 20th Border Horse (now part of the 12th Manitoba Dragoons), the 18th Manitoba Mounted Rifles, the 32nd Manitoba Horse (now part of The Fort Garry Horse), and the 15th Canadian Light Horse (now part of the South Alberta Light Horse).

On 7 November 1914, the 1st Regiment, Canadian Mounted Rifles, CEF, was authorized, and on 12 June 1915, the regiment embarked for the United Kingdom. On 22 September 1915, the 1st Regiment, CMR, disembarked in France where it fought as part of the 1st Brigade, Canadian Mounted Rifles. On 1 January 1916, the regiment was converted to infantry along with the other units of the Canadian Mounted Rifles and redesignated as the 1st Battalion, Canadian Mounted Rifles, CEF; after which it was assigned to the 8th Canadian Infantry Brigade, 3rd Canadian Division. The battalion fought in France and Flanders until the end of the Great War on 11 November 1918. On 15 November 1920, the 1st Battalion, CMR, was disbanded.

On 7 November 1914, the 9th Regiment, Canadian Mounted Rifles, CEF, was authorized, and on 23 November 1915, the regiment embarked for Great Britain. After its arrival in the UK, on 31 January 1916, the regiment's personnel were absorbed by the Canadian Cavalry Reserve Depot, CEF, the 1st Battalion, Canadian Mounted Rifles, CEF, and the 5th Battalion, Canadian Mounted Rifles, CEF. On 15 November 1920, the 9th Regiment, CMR, was disbanded.

On 7 November 1914, the 10th Regiment, Canadian Mounted Rifles, CEF, was authorized, and on 28 April 1916, the regiment embarked for Great Britain. After its arrival in the UK, on 22 May 1916, the regiment's personnel were absorbed by the Canadian Cavalry Reserve Depot, CEF. On 17 July 1917, the 9th Regiment, CMR, was disbanded.

=== 1920s–1930s ===
On 15 March 1920, as a result of the Canadian Militia reorganization following the Otter Commission, the 22nd Saskatchewan Light Horse was redesignated as The Saskatchewan Mounted Rifles.

On 15 December 1936, as a result of the 1936 Canadian Militia reorganization, The Saskatchewan Mounted Rifles was amalgamated with the 16th Canadian Light Horse to form the 16th/22nd Saskatchewan Horse (now part of The North Saskatchewan Regiment).

== Alliances ==
- United Kingdom: 9th Queen's Royal Lancers (until 1936)

== Uniform ==
The officers and other ranks of the 22nd Saskatchewan Light Horse for their full-dress uniform wore a scarlet serge frock with white collar facings and shoulder straps and dark blue pantaloons with double white stripes. For the regimental headdress, although they were authorized to wear the white pith helmet, the regiment like most other Western-Canadian cavalry units of the time instead wore the wide-brimmed “Montana peak” Stetson hat.

== Battle honours ==
- MOUNT SORREL
- SOMME, 1916
- Flers-Courcelette
- Ancre Heights
- ARRAS, 1917, '18
- Vimy, 1917
- HILL 70
- Ypres 1917
- Passchendaele
- AMIENS
- Scarpe, 1918
- Hindenburg Line
- Canal du Nord
- Cambrai, 1918
- Valenciennes
- FRANCE AND FLANDERS, 1915–18

== See also ==
- List of regiments of cavalry of the Canadian Militia (1900–1920)
