= 15th Canadian Light Horse =

- Active: 1905–1936
- Country: Canada
- Branch: Canadian Militia
- Type: Light cavalry
- Role: Cavalry
- Part of: Non-Permanent Active Militia
- Garrison/HQ: Calgary, Alberta
- Engagements: North-West Rebellion; First World War
- Battle honours: See #Battle Honours

The 15th Canadian Light Horse was a light cavalry regiment of the Non-Permanent Active Militia of the Canadian Militia (now the Canadian Army). First formed in 1905 as the 15th Light Horse, the regiment was redesignated in 1920 as the 15th Canadian Light Horse. In 1936, the regiment was amalgamated with The South Alberta Horse to form the 15th Alberta Light Horse (now part of the South Alberta Light Horse).

== Lineage ==
- Originated on 3 July 1905, in Calgary, Alberta, as the 15th Light Horse.
- Redesignated on 15 March 1920, as the 15th Canadian Light Horse.
- Amalgamated on 16 February 1936, with The South Alberta Horse and redesignated as the 15th Alberta Light Horse.

== Perpetuations ==
=== North West Rebellion ===
- Alberta Mounted Infantry

=== Great War ===
- 12th Regiment, Canadian Mounted Rifles

== History ==
=== Early history ===
On 3 July 1905, the 15th Light Horse was authorized for service and commanded by its founder, Colonel James Walker. Its regimental headquarters was at Calgary, and its A Squadron was also established there; B Squadron was set up at Macleod; C Squadron at High River; and D Squadron at Cochrane.

On 1 April 1906, the regiment's D Squadron was separated to form The Alberta Rangers (later the 23rd Alberta Rangers).

In 1907, an independent troop of the 15th Light Horse was established in Red Deer, Alberta. On 1 April 1910, this unit became the Red Deer Independent Squadron. On 15 January 1913, the independent squadron became part of the newly raised 35th Central Alberta Horse.

Donald Smith, 1st Baron Strathcona and Mount Royal, was offered the appointment of Honorary Colonel of the regiment in September 1909. The appointment was made official as of 24 November 1909.

=== Great War ===
At the start of the First World War, the 15th Light Horse was one of 6 cavalry regiments from across Western Canada to provide detachments that helped recruit the 6th Battalion (Fort Garrys), CEF for service with the first contingent of the Canadian Expeditionary Force. The other detachments were provided from the 34th Fort Garry Horse (now The Fort Garry Horse), the 20th Border Horse (now part of the 12th Manitoba Dragoons), the 18th Manitoba Mounted Rifles, the 32nd Manitoba Horse (now part of The Fort Garry Horse) and the 22nd Saskatchewan Light Horse (now part of The North Saskatchewan Regiment).

On 15 March 1915, the 12th Regiment, Canadian Mounted Rifles was authorized for service, and on 8 October 1915, the regiment embarked for Great Britain. On 3 February 1916, the regiment's personnel were absorbed by the Canadian Cavalry Depot, CEF, to provide reinforcements to the Canadian Corps in the field. On 5 April 1918, the 12th Regiment, Canadian Mounted Rifles was disbanded.

=== 1920s–1930s ===
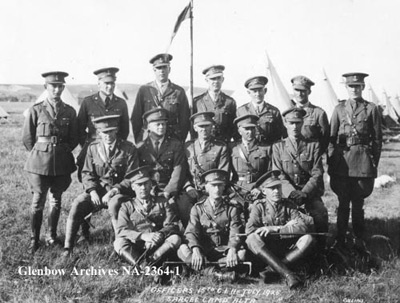
Officers, 15th Canadian Light Horse, Sarcee Army Camp, Calgary in 1925.

On 15 March 1920, as a result of the post-war Canadian Militia reorganization following the Otter Commission, the 15th Light Horse was redesignated as the 15th Canadian Light Horse.

On 16 February 1936, as a result of the 1936 Canadian Militia reorganization, the 15th Canadian Light Horse was amalgamated with The South Alberta Horse to form the 15th Alberta Light Horse.

== Uniform ==
The dress uniform of the 15th Light Horse included a scarlet serge frock with yellow collar facings and shoulder straps and dark blue pantaloons with double yellow stripes. For the regimental headdress, although they were authorized to wear the white pith helmet, the regiment, like most other Western-Canadian cavalry units of the time, instead wore the wide-brimmed “Montana peak” Stetson hat.

== Alliances ==
- United Kingdom – 15th The King's Hussars (until 1922)
- United Kingdom – 15th/19th The King's Royal Hussars (1922–1936)

== Battle honours ==
=== North West Rebellion ===
- North West Canada, 1885

=== Great War ===
- Mount Sorrel (Note: Selected to be borne on colours and appointments)
- Somme, 1916

== Notable members ==
- Major-General Lionel Frank Page CB DSO & Two Bars
- Colonel James Walker
- Lieutenant-Colonel Russel Lambert Boyle
- Colonel James Frederick Scott OBE ED QC

== See also ==
- List of regiments of cavalry of the Canadian Militia (1900–1920)

== Notes and references ==
- Luscombe, Stephen. "Canadian Cavalry". www.britishempire.co.uk.
