= Manitoba Horse =

The Manitoba Horse
- Active: 1912–1936
- Country: Canada
- Branch: Canadian Militia
- Type: Line cavalry
- Role: Cavalry
- Size: One regiment
- Part of: Non-Permanent Active Militia
- Garrison/HQ: Roblin, Manitoba
- Motto(s): Multum in parvo (Latin for 'Much in little')
- Anniversaries: Formation Day (1 April)
- Engagements: North-West Rebellion; First World War
- Battle honours: See #Battle Honours

The Manitoba Horse was a cavalry regiment of the Non-Permanent Active Militia of the Canadian Militia (now the Canadian Army). First formed in 1912 as the 32nd Light Horse, the regiment was redesignated later that same year as the 32nd Manitoba Horse and again in 1920 as The Manitoba Horse. In 1936, the regiment was amalgamated with The Fort Garry Horse.

== Lineage of the Manitoba Horse ==
- Originated on 1 April 1912 in Roblin, Manitoba, as the 32nd Light Horse.
- Redesignated on 2 November 1912 as the 32nd Manitoba Horse.
- Redesignated on 15 March 1920 as The Manitoba Horse.
- Amalgamated on 15 December 1936 with The Fort Garry Horse.

== Perpetuations ==
=== North West Rebellion ===
- Boulton's Mounted Corps

=== Great War ===
- 226th Battalion (Men of the North), CEF

== History ==
=== Early history ===
==== Boulton's Mounted Corps ====
On 10 April, 1885, Boulton's Mounted Corps was mobilized for active service under the command of Charles Arkoll Boulton. This unit served with Middleton's Column of the North West Field Force. On 18 September 1885, the corps was disbanded.

==== 32nd Manitoba Horse ====
On 1 April 1912, the 32nd Light Horse was authorized for service. Its headquarters was at Roblin and had squadrons at Roblin, Russell and Dauphin.

On 2 November 1912, the regiment was redesignated as the 32nd Manitoba Horse.

=== Great War ===
On 6 August 1914, Details from the 32nd Manitoba Horse were placed on active service for local protection duties.

At the start of the First World War, the 32nd Manitoba Horse was one of six cavalry regiments from across Western Canada to provide detachments to help form the 6th Battalion (Fort Garrys), CEF for service in the first contingent of the Canadian Expeditionary Force. The other detachments were provided from the 34th Fort Garry Horse (now the Fort Garry Horse), the 20th Border Horse (now part of the 12th Manitoba Dragoons), the 18th Manitoba Mounted Rifles, the 15th Canadian Light Horse (now the South Alberta Light Horse), and the 22nd Saskatchewan Light Horse (now part of the North Saskatchewan Regiment).

On 15 July 1916, the 226th Battalion (Men of the North), CEF was authorized for service and on 16 December 1916, the battalion embarked for Great Britain. After its arrival in the UK, on 7 April 1917, the battalion’s personnel were absorbed by the 14th Reserve Battalion, CEF to provide reinforcements for the Canadian Corps in the field. On 27 July 1917, the 226th Battalion, CEF was disbanded.

=== 1920s–1930s ===
On 15 March 1920, as a result of the Otter Commission and the following post-war reorganization of the militia, the 32nd Manitoba Horse was redesignated as The Manitoba Horse.

In 1932, the regiment was granted the perpetuation of Boulton's Mounted Corps from the North-West Rebellion.

On 15 December 1936, as a result of the 1936 Canadian Militia reorganization, the Manitoba Horse was amalgamated with the Fort Garry Horse.

== Uniform ==
The regiment’s full dress uniform consisted of a scarlet tunic with yellow facings.

== Battle honours ==
=== North-West Rebellion ===
- Fish Creek
- Batoche
- North West Canada, 1885

=== Great War ===
- Somme, 1916
- Hill 70
- Ypres, 1917
- Amiens
- Arras, 1918
- Hindenburg Line
- Pursuit to Mons

== Notable members ==
- Lieutenant Colonel Charles Arkoll Boulton
- Wing Commander William George Barker, VC DSO MC

== See also ==
- List of regiments of cavalry of the Canadian Militia (1900–1920)
