= Manitoba Mounted Rifles =

The Manitoba Mounted Rifles
- Active: 1907–1946
- Country: Canada
- Branch: Canadian Militia (1907–1940); Canadian Army (1940–1946)
- Type: Light cavalry
- Role: Cavalry
- Size: One regiment
- Part of: Non-Permanent Active Militia (1907–1940); Royal Canadian Armoured Corps (1940–1946)
- Garrison/HQ: Portage la Prairie, Manitoba
- Mottos: Latin: Ut irruant omnes, lit. 'To rush all'
- Engagements: First World War
- Battle honours: See #Battle honours

The Manitoba Mounted Rifles was a cavalry regiment of the Non-Permanent Active Militia of the Canadian Militia and later the Canadian Army. In 1946, the regiment was converted to artillery.

== Lineage ==
- Originated on 2 April 1907, in Winnipeg, Manitoba, as the 18th Manitoba Mounted Rifles.
- Redesignated on 15 March 1920 as The Manitoba Mounted Rifles.
- Converted from cavalry to artillery on 1 April 1946 and amalgamated with the 37th Field Battery, RCA, and redesignated as the 67th Light Anti-Aircraft Regiment (Manitoba Mounted Rifles).
- Regiment moved on 12 July 1948 from Portage la Prairie to Fort William, Ontario.
- Amalgamated on 1 December 1954 with the 118th Medium Battery, RCA (Port Arthur, Ontario) under the latter unit's name.

== Perpetuations ==
- 1st Battalion, Canadian Mounted Rifles

== History ==
The regiment was first formed on 2 April 1907, originally as the 18th Manitoba Mounted Rifles. The regimental headquarters was established at Winnipeg and had squadrons established in Winnipeg, Dominion City, Portage la Prairie and Morden.

=== First World War ===
At the start of the First World War, the 18th Mounted Rifles was one of six cavalry regiments from across Western Canada to provide detachments to help form the 6th Battalion (Fort Garrys), CEF, for service in the first contingent of the Canadian Expeditionary Force. The other detachments were provided from the 34th Fort Garry Horse (now The Fort Garry Horse), the 20th Border Horse (now part of the 12th Manitoba Dragoons), the 32nd Manitoba Horse (now part of The Fort Garry Horse), the 15th Canadian Light Horse (now the South Alberta Light Horse), and the 22nd Saskatchewan Light Horse (now part of The North Saskatchewan Regiment).

On 7 November 1914, the 1st Regiment, Canadian Mounted Rifles, CEF, was authorized, and on 12 June 1915, the regiment embarked for the United Kingdom. On 22 September 1915, the 1st Regiment, CMR, disembarked in France where it fought as part of the 1st Brigade, Canadian Mounted Rifles. On 1 January 1916, the regiment was converted to infantry along with the other units of the Canadian Mounted Rifles and redesignated as the 1st Battalion, Canadian Mounted Rifles, CEF; after which it was assigned to the 8th Canadian Infantry Brigade, 3rd Canadian Division. The battalion fought in France and Flanders until the end of the Great War on 11 November 1918. On 15 November 1920, the 1st Battalion, CMR, was disbanded.

=== 1920s–1930s ===
On 15 March 1920, as a result of the Otter Commission, the regiment was redesignated as The Manitoba Mounted Rifles.

=== Second World War ===
During the Second World War, the Manitoba Mounted Rifles provided detachments along with the 12th Manitoba Dragoons and the 2nd Armoured Car Regiment to form the 18th (Manitoba) Reconnaissance Battalion.

This active service unit was later redesignated as the 18th (Manitoba) Armoured Car Regiment and finally as the 18th Armoured Car Regiment (12th Manitoba Dragoons) where it served directly under the II Canadian Corps serving in Northwest Europe until VE Day.

=== Post War ===
==== From cavalry to artillery (and a new province) ====
On 1 April 1946, the Manitoba Mounted Rifles were converted to artillery and amalgamated with the 37th Field Battery, RCA, as the 67th Light Anti-Aircraft Regiment (Manitoba Mounted Rifles).

On 12 July 1948, the regiment was transferred to Fort William, Ontario.

On 1 December 1954, the 67th Light Anti-Aircraft Regiment (Manitoba Mounted Rifles) and the 118th Medium Battery, RCA, were amalgamated under the latter unit's name.

== Organization ==
The Manitoba Mounted Rifles (15 March 1920):

- Regimental Headquarters (Portage la Prairie)
- A Squadron (Manitou)
- B Squadron (Altamont)
- C Squadron (Portage la Prairie)

== Alliances ==
- United Kingdom - 18th Royal Hussars (Queen Mary's Own) (Until 1922)
- United Kingdom - 13th/18th Royal Hussars (Queen Mary's Own) (1922–1946)

== Battle honours ==
- MOUNT SORREL
- SOMME, 1916
- Flers-Courcelette
- Ancre Heights
- ARRAS, 1917, '18
- Vimy, 1917
- HILL 70
- Ypres, 1917
- Passchendaele
- AMIENS
- Scarpe, 1918
- Hindenburg Line
- Canal du Nord
- Cambrai, 1918
- Valenciennes
- FRANCE AND FLANDERS, 1915-18

== See also ==
- List of regiments of cavalry of the Canadian Militia (1900–1920)
