= Border Horse =

The Border Horse
- Active: 1908–1935
- Country: Canada
- Branch: Canadian Militia
- Type: Line cavalry
- Role: Cavalry
- Size: One regiment
- Part of: Non-Permanent Active Militia
- Garrison/HQ: Estevan, Saskatchewan
- Engagements: First World War
- Battle honours: See #Battle Honours

The Border Horse was a cavalry regiment of the Non-Permanent Active Militia of the Canadian Militia (now the Canadian Army). In 1935, the regiment was amalgamated with the 12th Manitoba Dragoons.

== Lineage ==
- Originated on 1 April 1908, in Estevan, Saskatchewan, as the 20th Mounted Rifles.
- Redesignated on 1 March 1910, as the 20th Border Horse.
- Redesignated on 15 March 1920, as The Border Horse.
- Amalgamated on 31 January 1935, with the 12th Manitoba Dragoons.

== Perpetuations ==
=== Great War ===
- 6th Battalion (Fort Garrys), CEF

== History ==
=== Early history ===
On 1 April 1908, the 20th Mounted Rifles was authorized. The regiment had its Headquarters at Estevan and squadrons at Estevan, Carnduff and Carlyle.

On 1 March 1910, the regiment was redesignated as the 20th Border Horse.

=== The Great War ===
On 6 August 1914, Details of the 20th Border Horse were placed on active service for local protective duties.

On 10 August 1914, the 6th Battalion (Fort Garrys), CEF, was authorized for service. Most of the recruits would come from detachments from at least six different cavalry militia regiments from across Western Canada: the 34th Fort Garry Horse, the 20th Border Horse, the 18th Manitoba Mounted Rifles, the 32nd Manitoba Horse, the 15th Canadian Light Horse from Alberta, and the 22nd Saskatchewan Light Horse. On 29 September 1914, the battalion embarked for Great Britain. On 20 January 1915, the battalion formed the nucleus of the Remount Depot. On 6 March 1915, the remainder of the battalion were absorbed by the Canadian Cavalry Depot, CEF, to provide reinforcements for the Canadian Corps in the field. On 5 April 1918, the 6th Battalion, CEF was disbanded.

=== 1920s-1930s ===
On 15 March 1920, as a result of the Otter Commission and the following post-war reorganization of the militia, the 20th Border Horse was Redesignated as The Border Horse.

On 31 January 1935, the regiment was Amalgamated with the 12th Manitoba Dragoons.

== Battle Honours ==
- Somme, 1916, '18
- Cambrai, 1917
- Amiens
- Hindenburg Line
- Pursuit to Mons

== See also ==
- List of regiments of cavalry of the Canadian Militia (1900–1920)
