= 1st Battalion, Canadian Mounted Rifles, CEF =

- Active: 1914–1920
- Country: Canada
- Branch: Canadian Expeditionary Force
- Type: Mounted Infantry
- Role: Mounted Infantry, Infantry
- Size: One Regiment / One Battalion
- Part of: 8th Canadian Infantry Brigade
- Battle honours: Mount Sorrel; Somme, 1916; Flers-Courcelette; Ancre Heights; Arras, 1917, '18; Vimy, 1917; Hill 70; Ypres, 1917; Passchendaele; Amiens; Scarpe, 1918; Hindenburg Line; Canal du Nord; Cambrai, 1918; Valenciennes; France and Flanders, 1915–18

Insignia
- Battle patch

The 1st Battalion, Canadian Mounted Rifles, CEF, was an infantry battalion of the Canadian Army. Raised for service during the First World War as part of the Canadian Expeditionary Force (CEF), it was formed in November 1914, in Brandon, Manitoba. Originally a mounted infantry unit named the 1st Regiment, Canadian Mounted Rifles, CEF, which was expanded, following its rerolling and dismounting as an infantry unit, by absorbing other units of the Canadian Mounted Rifles (CMR).

== History ==
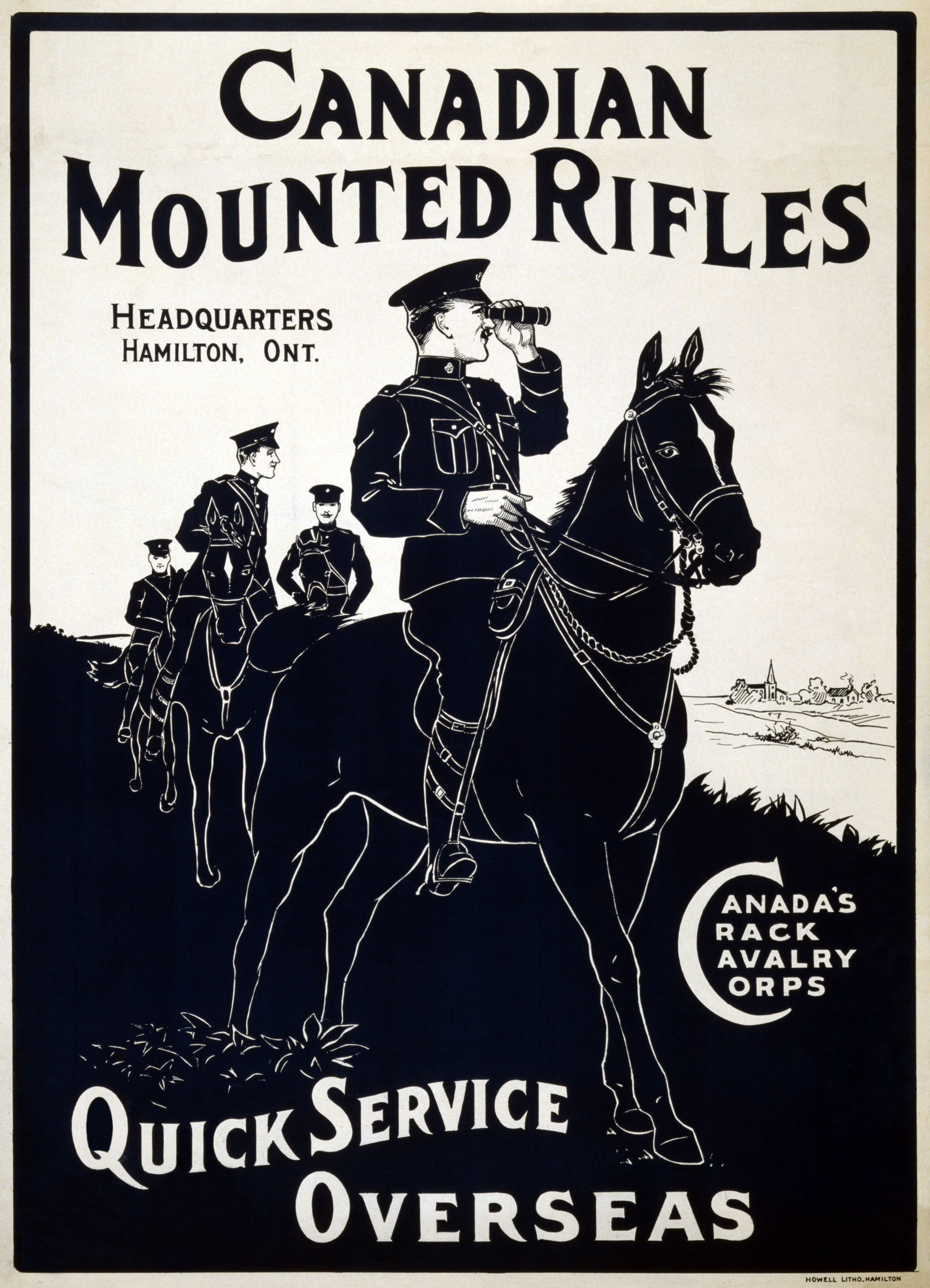
Canadian Mounted Rifles recruitment poster

Following the outbreak of the war, the Canadian Government decided to raise an initially volunteer force for service overseas, with the force to be known as the Canadian Expeditionary Force. As a unit of this force, the 1st Battalion, Canadian Mounted Rifles was formed on 7 November 1914 in Brandon, Manitoba.

Part of the 1st Brigade Canadian Mounted Rifles, the unit landed in France on September 22, 1915, where the conditions of the Western Front made its mounted status more of a hindrance than a benefit. On January 1, 1916, both CMR brigades (six regiments) were dismounted, converted to infantry and reorganized as the 8th Infantry Brigade (four battalions). The 1st Regiment, CMR, became the 1st Battalion, CMR, and it absorbed half the personnel of the 3rd Regiment, CMR (the other half going to the 2nd Battalion, CMR). The battalion fought in most of the 3rd Canadian Division's engagements until the end of the war. The 1st CMR, along with the 4th CMR, was manning the 3rd Division's front on June 2, 1916, when the Germans launched their assault at the outset of the Battle of Mount Sorrel. Its positions were overrun, and 557 of its 692 members (80%) were killed, wounded or captured.

The battalion was rebuilt over the summer, and it was one of the first Canadian Corps units to attack when the corps shifted to the Somme. On September 15, 1916, the 1st CMR was in the first wave attacking Mouquet Farm. Although the attack gained ground, the Canadians did not take the strong point, but the assault was considered a successful diversion from the main attack on Courcelette.

At Vimy Ridge the 1st CMR took 350 prisoners but suffered 365 killed and wounded.

Following the end of the war, and efforts of demobilisation, the battalion was disbanded on November 15, 1920.

=== Perpetuation ===
Perpetuation of the 1st Battalion, CMR, was initially assigned to the Manitoba Mounted Rifles and The Saskatchewan Mounted Rifles. The Manitoba Mounted Rifles converted to artillery in 1946 as the 118th Medium Battery, RCA (in Fort William, Ontario) and this battery was virtually disbanded (see Supplementary Order of Battle) in 1965. The Saskatchewan Mounted Rifles merged with the 16th Canadian Light Horse into the 16th/22nd Saskatchewan Horse in 1936, which converted to infantry in 1941 as the Battleford Light Infantry (16th/22nd Saskatchewan Horse). This regiment merged into the Prince Albert and Battleford Volunteers in 1946, which in turn became part of the North Saskatchewan Regiment (Machine Gun) in 1955. This infantry regiment (now simply "The North Saskatchewan Regiment") continues to perpetuate the battle honours and traditions of the battalion.

== Battle Honours ==
- MOUNT SORREL
- SOMME, 1916
- Flers-Courcelette
- Ancre Heights
- ARRAS, 1917, '18
- Vimy, 1917
- HILL 70
- Ypres 1917
- Passchendaele
- AMIENS
- Scarpe, 1918
- Hindenburg Line
- Canal du Nord
- Cambrai, 1918
- Valenciennes
- FRANCE AND FLANDERS, 1915-18

== See also ==
- List of mounted regiments in the Canadian Expeditionary Force
- List of infantry battalions in the Canadian Expeditionary Force
