= 16th/22nd Saskatchewan Horse =

- Active: 1936–1946
- Country: Canada
- Branch: Canadian Militia (1936–1940); Canadian Army (1940–1946)
- Type: Line Cavalry
- Role: Cavalry; Armoured; Infantry
- Size: One Regiment
- Part of: Non-Permanent Active Militia (1936–1940); Royal Canadian Armoured Corps (1940–1943); Royal Canadian Infantry Corps (1941–1946)
- Garrison/HQ: Lloydminster, Saskatchewan
- Engagements: First World War; Second World War
- Battle honours: See #Battle Honours

The 16th/22nd Saskatchewan Horse was a cavalry regiment of the Non-Permanent Active Militia of the Canadian Militia (now the Canadian Army). The regiment was formed in 1936, when the 16th Canadian Light Horse was amalgamated with The Saskatchewan Mounted Rifles. After a number of changes, the regiment now forms part of The North Saskatchewan Regiment.

== Lineage ==
=== 16th/22nd Saskatchewan Horse ===
- Originated on 3 July 1905, in Regina, Saskatchewan, as the 16th Mounted Rifles.
- Redesignated on 1 October 1908, as the 16th Light Horse.
- Redesignated on 15 March 1920, as the 16th Canadian Light Horse.
- Amalgamated on 15 December 1936, with The Saskatchewan Mounted Rifles, and redesignated as the 16th/22nd Saskatchewan Horse.
- Redesignated on 7 November 1940, as the 16th/22nd Saskatchewan Horse (Reserve).
- Converted on 1 April 1941, from cavalry to infantry, and redesignated as the 2nd (Reserve) Battalion, 16th/22nd Saskatchewan Horse.
- Amalgamated on 1 May 1941, with The Battleford Light Infantry and redesignated as the 2nd (Reserve) Battalion, The Battleford Light Infantry (16th/22nd Saskatchewan Horse).
- Redesignated on 15 September 1944, as The Battleford Light Infantry (16th/22nd Saskatchewan Horse) (Reserve).
- Amalgamated on 1 April 1946, with the 2nd (Reserve) Battalion, The Prince Albert Volunteers and redesignated as The Prince Albert and Battleford Volunteers.

=== The Saskatchewan Mounted Rifles ===
- Originated on 2 March 1908, in Lloydminster as the Saskatchewan Light Horse.
- Redesignated on 1 April 1908, as the 22nd Saskatchewan Light Horse.
- Redesignated on 15 March 1920, as The Saskatchewan Mounted Rifles.
- Amalgamated on 15 December 1936, with the 16th Canadian Light Horse.

== Perpetuations ==
=== North-West Rebellion ===
- The Moose Mountain Scouts

=== Great War ===
- The Canadian Light Horse
- 1st Regiment, Canadian Mounted Rifles
- 9th Regiment, Canadian Mounted Rifles
- 10th Regiment, Canadian Mounted Rifles

== History ==
=== 1936–1939 ===
As a direct result of the 1936 Canadian Militia reorganization, the 16th/22nd Saskatchewan Horse was formed by the amalgamation of the 16th Canadian Light Horse and The Saskatchewan Mounted Rifles.

=== Second World War ===
==== Overseas Unit ====
On 24 May 1940, the 16th/22nd Saskatchewan Horse mobilized the 16th/22nd Saskatchewan Horse, CASF for active service. On 26 January 1942, it was redesignated as the 20th Reconnaissance Battalion (16/22 Saskatchewan Horse), CAC, CASF. On 15 May 1942, it was redesignated as the 20th Army Tank Regiment (16/22 Saskatchewan Horse), CAC, CASF and was assigned to the 2nd Canadian Army Tank Brigade. On 16 June 1943, the regiment along with the rest of the 2nd Canadian Army Tank Brigade embarked for Great Britain.

After the brigade was reorganized as the 2nd Canadian Armoured Brigade, on 1 November 1943, the 20th Army Tank Regiment (16/22 Saskatchewan Horse), CAC was disbanded.

==== Reserve unit ====
On 1 April 1941, the 16th/22nd Saskatchewan Horse (Reserve) was converted from cavalry to infantry and was redesignated as the 2nd (Reserve) Battalion, 16th/22nd Saskatchewan Horse. On 1 May 1941, the regiment was amalgamated with the Battleford portion of the Prince Albert and Battleford Volunteers and designated as The Battleford Light Infantry (16th/22nd Saskatchewan Horse).

=== Post War ===
On 1 April 1946, The Battleford Light Infantry (16th/22nd Saskatchewan Horse) was amalgamated with The Prince Albert Volunteers to reform The Prince Albert and Battleford Volunteers (now part of The North Saskatchewan Regiment).

== Organization ==
=== 17th/22nd Saskatchewan Horse (15 December 1936) ===
- Regimental Headquarters (Lloydminster)
- A Squadron (Yorkton)
- B Squadron (Saltcoats)
- C Squadron (Lashburn)

== Alliances ==
- United Kingdom - 9th Queen's Royal Lancers (1936–1946)
- United Kingdom - 16th/5th Lancers (1936–1946)

== Battle Honours ==
=== North-West Rebellion ===
- North West Canada, 1885

=== The Great War ===
- Ypres, 1915, ‘17
- Festubert, 1915
- MOUNT SORREL
- Somme, 1916
- Flers-Courcelette
- Ancre Heights
- ARRAS, 1917, '18
- Vimy, 1917
- HILL 70
- Passchendaele
- Amiens
- Scarpe, 1918
- Drocourt-Quéant
- Hindenburg Line
- Canal du Nord
- Cambrai, 1918
- Valenciennes
- France and Flanders, 1915–18
