= 18th Canadian Light Horse =

- Active: 1911-1936
- Country: Canada
- Branch: Canadian Militia
- Type: Light cavalry
- Part of: Non-Permanent Active Militia
- Garrison/HQ: Saskatoon, Saskatchewan
- Engagements: First World War
- Battle honours: See #Battle Honours

The 18th Canadian Light Horse was a light cavalry regiment of the Non-Permanent Active Militia of the Canadian Militia (now the Canadian Army). In 1936, the regiment was converted from cavalry to artillery as the 67th Field Battery, RCA (later made part of the 10th Field Artillery Regiment, RCA).

== Lineage ==
- Originated on 1 April 1911, in Saskatoon, Saskatchewan, as the 29th Light Horse.
- Redesignated on 15 March 1920, as the 18th Canadian Light Horse.
- Amalgamated on 15 December 1936, with the 67th Field Battery, RCA, and redesignated as the 67th (Rosetown) Field Battery, RCA.

== History ==
On 1 May 1911, the 29th Light Horse was first authorized for service. Its regimental headquarters was in Saskatoon, and it had squadrons in Saskatoon, Allan, and Prince Albert. The squadrons in Saskatoon and Allan were pre-existing and were transferred from the 22nd Saskatchewan Light Horse.

On 6 August 1914, details from the 29th Light Horse were placed on active service for local protection duties.

On 15 March 1920, as a result of the reforms after the Otter Commission, the 29th Light Horse was redesignated as the 18th Canadian Light Horse.

On 15 December 1936, as a result of the 1936 Canadian Militia reorganization, the 18th Canadian Light Horse was converted from cavalry to artillery, amalgamated with 67th Field Battery, RCA, and redesignated as the 67th (Rosetown) Field Battery, RCA. This unit now forms part of the 10th Field Artillery Regiment, RCA. Prior to this amalgamation, the 67th Battery had existed only on paper, having been authorized in 1920 but never organized.

== Uniform ==
When first formed, the officers and other ranks of the 29th Light Horse for their full-dress uniform wore a scarlet serge frock with scarlet collar facings and yellow shoulder straps and dark blue pantaloons with double yellow stripes. For the regimental headdress, although they were authorized to wear the white pith helmet, the regiment like most other Western-Canadian cavalry units of the time instead wore the wide-brimmed “Montana peak” Stetson hat.

After the First World War when the regiment was redesignated as the 18th Canadian Light Horse, their full-dress uniform was simplified to a scarlet tunic with yellow facings.

== Battle honours ==
- Ypres, 1915
- Festubert, 1915

== See also ==
- List of regiments of cavalry of the Canadian Militia (1900–1920)
