= J. Fred Scott =

Canadian politician

Colonel Col. J. Frederick (Fred) Scott OBE ED KC
- Colonel J. Frederick (Fred) Scott, OBE, ED, KC

Personal details
- Born: James Frederick Scott; 3 July 1892 Meaford, Ontario
- Died: 13 February 1982 (aged 89) Calgary, Canada
- Civilian awards: King's Counsel

Military service
- Branch/service: Canadian Expeditionary Force; Canadian Army
- Years of service: 1914–1945
- Rank: Colonel
- Unit: 21st Alberta Hussars; 89th Battalion (Alberta), CEF; 9th Battalion, CEF; 50th Battalion (Calgary), CEF; 15th Canadian Light Horse
- Commands: 15th Alberta Light Horse; 1st Battalion The Calgary Highlanders, Canadian Army Battle Drill School (Vernon, BC)
- Battles/wars: World War I World War II
- Military awards: Order of the British Empire, Efficiency Decoration

James Frederick Scott, OBE, ED, KC (3 July 1892 – 13 February 1982) was a Canadian military officer who served in the First World War, and commanded The Calgary Highlanders at the start of the Second World War. Colonel Scott was admitted to the Order of the British Empire for his work founding battle drill training in the Canadian Army.

== Biography ==
James Frederick Scott was born in Meaford, Ontario on 3 July 1892 to James M. Scott, a merchant. He began his education in Meaford, then moved to Alberta and completed school at Oyen between 1911 and 1914. He entered law school and served part time in the Militia as a cavalryman in the 21st Alberta Hussars.

=== First World War ===
After the outbreak of the First World War he joined the Canadian Expeditionary Force in 1915. He enlisted in the 89th Battalion, a reinforcement unit from Alberta, and commissioned as a lieutenant in November 1915. He left Canada in May 1916 on S.S. Olympic, and was hospitalized for pneumonia and "trench fever" in September 1916. He left the 89th Battalion and was posted to the 9th Reserve Battalion in October 1916. He transferred to the Royal Flying Corps as an observer from 15 February to 30 April 1917, flying with 45 Squadron until grounded for medical reasons and returned to the CEF. He went to France with the 50th Battalion on 1 May 1917, and went sick on 1 June 1917 from exposure to cold, wet and lice. He was hospitalized in France, and returned to the UK for hospitalization. He transferred to the 9th Reserve Battalion in September 1917 and was given an extended sick leave to Canada. He was designated unfit for further overseas service in February 1918. He was posted to the 1st Alberta Depot Battalion as a captain, and was hospitalized in Calgary in October 1918 with "recurring trench fever." He was demobilized and struck off the strength of the Canadian Expeditionary Force in January 1919.

=== Interwar ===
Scott remained in the military as a reservist with the 15th Canadian Light Horse. He married Olga Larson on 22 September 1920, and completed law studies at Osgoode Hall and the University of Alberta. He practiced law in Calgary and became an officer of the 15th Alberta Light Horse when the 15th CLH was amalgamated to create that regiment. He was appointed commanding officer with the rank of lieutenant-colonel on 12 February 1934.

=== Second World War ===
Canada began mobilizing for the Second World War in August 1939. The 15th Alberta Light Horse was not mobilized for active service. The commanding officer of The Calgary Highlanders had replaced the Light Horse in the mobilization scheme, but their commanding officer was deemed medically unfit for active service. Scott was given command of the Calgary Highlanders on 25 August 1939 and commanded the unit's 1st Battalion when it formally mobilized on 1 September.

Scott commanded the 1st Battalion in Canada, Shilo, and the United Kingdom. His main achievement was adopting a new system of training the British Army called "Battle Drill." The idea was not popular and Scott had to fight "tooth and nail" to convince the Canadian Army overseas of its value. Scott first instituted the training in the Highlanders, and it then spread to the rest of the Canadian Army. As part of a shakedown of older officers in the United Kingdom, Scott was returned to Canada in 1942, promoted to colonel, and used his expertise in battle drill to start the Canadian Army's own training school in Vernon, British Columbia. Scott also lent his advice to the First Special Service Force during their period of training in Montana. Scott also commanded training bases in Brockville and Borden, Ontario. He served as chief instructor at Kingston Military College with 12,000 students under his command.

=== Post war ===
Scott left the military in 1945, and practiced law with Valentine Milvain.

He was still practicing law at the age of 82 when a Calgary school was named in his honour. Scott died in Calgary on 13 February 1982.

==== Equestrian pursuits ====
Scott was an accomplished horseman, serving in cavalry units from 1914 to 1939. He was the first Militia officer to win the Guide's Cup, a point-to-point race for cavalry officers. He played on championship polo teams in 1934 and 1936. He ran a thriving breeding stable for over thirty years later in life known as the Baha Tinda Stock Farm. Many of his horses ran at Stampede Park carrying his distinctive blue, red and yellow racing silks, and almost every one of the over 200 colts and fillies he raised qualified for top stakes races in Western Canada. Among his thoroughbreds was the 1970 Alberta Derby winner Tinga Bulldog.

=== Family ===
Scott was married to his wife Olga for 60 years, until her death in February 1981. They had four children together; two sons and two daughters.

Scott's oldest child, Sydney Scott, was born in Calgary on 10 July 1922. Sydney had two sons and three daughters; Susan, Victoria, Alix (who died in 2003), Jim and Douglas. She died as Sydney Turner on June 11, 2011.

Scott's second child Sheila Marie Scott was born 15 April 1926. She served in the Canadian Women's Army Corps and the Women's Royal Naval Service. She married Lieutenant-Commander David J.H. Davis in 1955, completed law school, and served as a current affairs panelist for CFCN Television in Calgary. She died on 10 August 2018. She also had 3 children, Chris, Stuart, and Leslie Davis

Scott also had two sons.

James Bernard Scott who died in 1954 at 21 years old in a plane crash in his Mustang fighter plane whilst practicing routine sequence at the time, he died with the rank of flying officer in the Canadian Air Force

Fred L. Scott, a lawyer who served in the Calgary Highlanders and married Wilma J. MacLean and had three children, Laura, Cheryl and Fred scott.

== Legacy ==
Scott's ashes were kept by his eldest daughter for 24 years before being committed to the veterans' cemetery in Esquimalt, British Columbia.

=== Colonel J. Fred Scott School ===
A primary school opened in the Whitehorn community in June 1977 was named in Scott's honour. Colonel J. Fred Scott school accommodates kindergarten through grade 6 as part of the Calgary Board of Education's public school system. The school received notice in the press for playing a leading role instituting a city-wide school lunch program in 1986, and was still focusing on feeding hungry students in 2008. In 1987, students of the school composed a winning entry in the Song for Calgary Contest. Calgary - A Symphony! was composed by grade 5 and 6 students with the help of folk singer Paul Finkleman and his wife Deborah Robin and both school and song received international attention when a recording of the students singing Calgary - A Symphony was reviewed in the Detroit Free Press as "the best of the lot" of music released in conjunction with the 1988 Winter Olympics held in Calgary.

The school published a cookbook that was praised in the Calgary Herald for its celebration of "diversity of color and culture" in October 1994. Rotary Clubs in both Calgary and Pakistan assisted students at the school in collecting school supplies for refugees of the war in Afghanistan. The project began on March 22, 2012, the first day of school following the overthrow of the Taliban. The students went on to raise $2,000 for computer equipment and internet access for Afghan students in a partnership with Focus Humanitarian Assistance.

Grade 1 and 2 students were profiled in the Canadian Broadcasting Corporation's The Homestretch program in March 2020 for a community artwork project celebrating the Whitehorn community of Calgary.

The school generally performed below average in academic marks when compared to schools across Calgary in 2003. Many students at the time were refugees of the war in Afghanistan and spoke English as a second language.

The building has been used as a polling station for municipal and school board elections, community fitness classes, and other community educational programs. The school was selected to host the kick-off of the Calgary Educational Partnership Foundation's reading incentive program on January 17, 2003, an event attended by Jarome Iginla and other National Hockey League celebrities.
