= 21st Alberta Hussars =

- Active: 1908-1920
- Country: Canada
- Branch: Canadian Militia
- Type: Hussars
- Role: Light Cavalry
- Size: One Regiment
- Part of: Non-Permanent Active Militia
- Garrison/HQ: Medicine Hat, Alberta
- Engagements: First World War

The 21st Alberta Hussars were a light cavalry regiment of the Non-Permanent Active Militia of the Canadian Militia (now the Canadian Army). In 1920, the regiment was reorganized as The Alberta Mounted Rifles.

== Lineage ==
=== 21st Alberta Hussars ===
- Originated on 1 April 1908, in Medicine Hat, Alberta, as the 21st Alberta Hussars.
- Redesignated on 15 March 1920, as The Alberta Mounted Rifles.

== Organization ==
21st Alberta Hussars (1 April 1908)

- Regimental Headquarters (Medicine Hat, Alberta)
- A Squadron (first raised on 1 June 1901, as D Squadron, Canadian Mounted Rifles)
- B Squadron

== Notable Members ==
- Colonel James Frederick Scott OBE ED QC
- Lieutenant Colonel Nelson Spencer DSO
- Captain Charles Pingle

== See also ==
- List of regiments of cavalry of the Canadian Militia (1900–1920)
