= 33rd Vaudreuil and Soulanges Hussars =

- Active: 1912–1914
- Country: Canada
- Branch: Canadian Militia
- Type: Hussars
- Role: Cavalry
- Size: One Regiment
- Part of: Non-Permanent Active Militia
- Garrison/HQ: Rigaud, Quebec
- Engagements: N/A

The 33rd Vaudreuil and Soulanges Hussars was a short-lived light cavalry regiment of the Non-Permanent Active Militia of the Canadian Militia (now the Canadian Army).

== History ==
The 33rd Vaudreuil and Soulanges Hussars were first authorized on 15 April 1912. The formation of the 33rd Hussars was an attempt to form a French-speaking cavalry regiment in the Canadian Militia. Its regimental headquarters was temporarily located at Rigaud, Quebec. It was to consist to four squadrons lettered A to D.

On 15 July 1912, "B" Squadron of the 17th Duke of York's Royal Canadian Hussars was transferred to the 33rd Vaudreuil and Soulanges Hussars. In turn, the 17th DYRC Hussars created a replacement squadron from personnel of the recently disbanded 11th Argenteuil Rangers.

However, the regiment was never fully organized, and with the outbreak of the First World War, by 1 October 1914, the 33rd Hussars were disbanded. It was the only time the Canadian Militia attempted to form an entirely French-speaking mounted regiment.

== See also ==
- List of regiments of cavalry of the Canadian Militia (1900–1920)
