= British Columbia Dragoons =

Canadian Army reserve armoured unit

- Active: 1908–present
- Country: Canada
- Branch: Canadian Army
- Type: Line cavalry
- Role: Armoured reconnaissance
- Size: Two squadrons
- Part of: 39 Canadian Brigade Group
- Garrison/HQ: 720 Lawrence Avenue, Kelowna
- Motto: Quansem ilep (Chinook jargon for 'always first')
- Colours: Scarlet with yellow facings (full dress); scarlet with black facings (mess dress)
- March: Quick: "Fare Ye Well Inniskilling (5th Royal Inniskilling Dragoon Guards)"; Pipe bands: "Scotland the Brave"
- Anniversaries: 1 April 1911 (BC Horse formed)
- Engagements: First World War; Second World War; War in Afghanistan
- Battle honours: See #Battle honours

Commanders
- Current commander: LCol AW Peters

Insignia
- NATO Map Symbol
- Abbreviation: BCD

The British Columbia Dragoons (BCD) is a Primary Reserve armoured reconnaissance regiment of the Canadian Army. It is based in Kelowna and Vernon, British Columbia, and is part of 2nd Canadian Division's 39 Canadian Brigade Group.

Both Regimental Headquarters and "A" Squadron are located in Kelowna, British Columbia.

== History ==
The British Columbia Dragoons trace their origins to the formation of the Canadian Mounted Rifles, two independent squadrons of horse in Kamloops and Vernon in 1908. In 1910 two additional squadrons were raised and the regiment was renamed the British Columbia Horse. In 1912 the unit was reorganized into two separate regiments: the 30th Regiment, British Columbia Horse and the 31st Regiment, British Columbia Horse (later known as the British Columbia Hussars). 1914 saw the formation of the Victoria Independent Squadron on Vancouver Island.

=== First World War ===
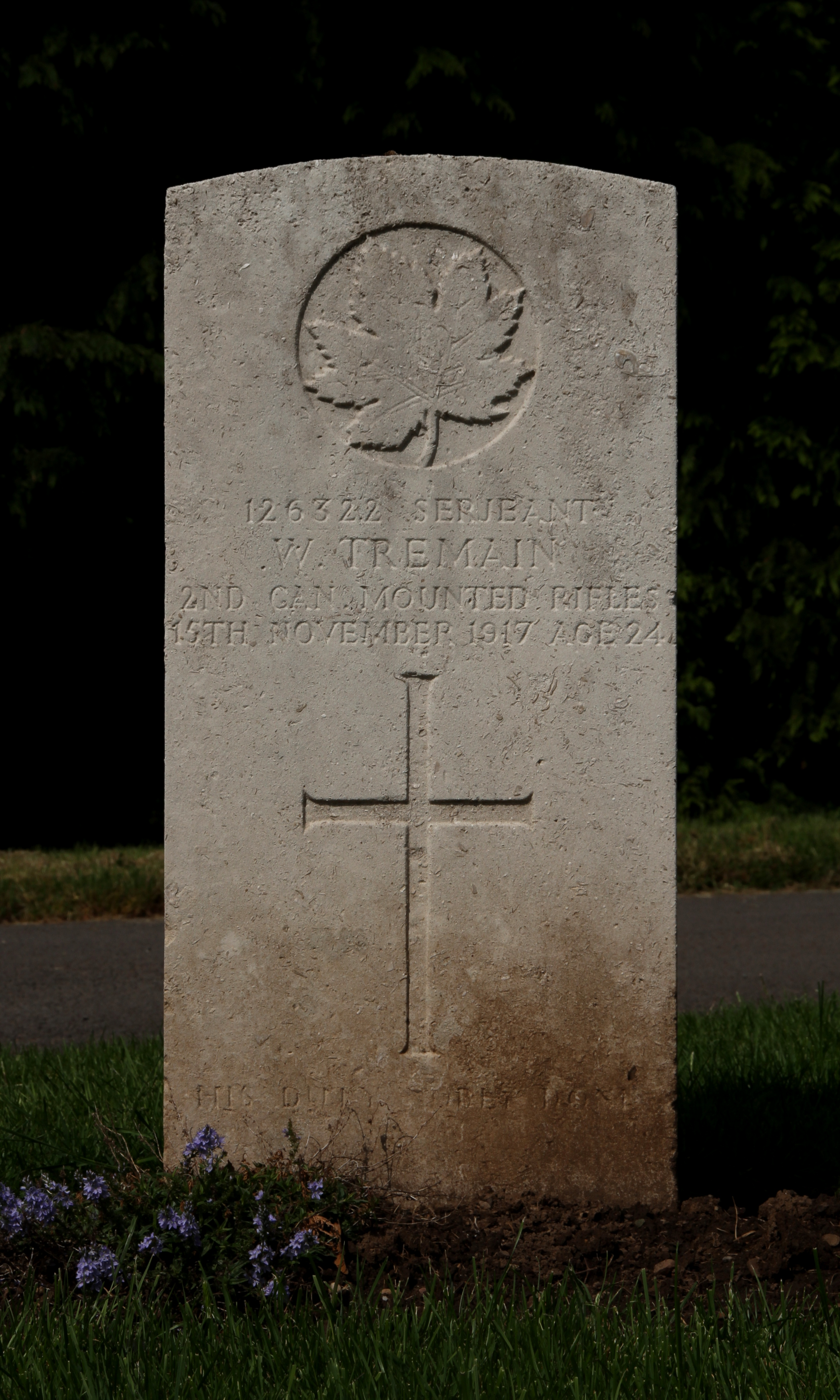
Grave of Sgt W Tremain, 2nd Canadian Mounted Rifles, Cathays Cemetery, Cardiff, died 19 November 1917.

In the Great War the regiment was not mobilized, but in December 1914 many volunteers from the regiment joined the newly formed 2nd Regiment Canadian Mounted Rifles. After some limited service in France as cavalry, the unit was reroled to infantry as 2nd Canadian Mounted Rifles Battalion on January 1, 1916. The battalion became part of the 8th Canadian Infantry Brigade, and fought with great luck and success on the Western Front. Despite being trained as cavalry but deployed as infantry, the regiment managed the war well. Captain "Jock" MacGregor was awarded the Victoria Cross for actions taken in the battle at Cambrai on September 29, 1918. The actions and awards of the 2nd Canadian Mounted Rifles are perpetuated today by the British Columbia Dragoons, their direct descendants.

The British Columbia Dragoons perpetuate the following units of the Canadian Expeditionary Force:

- 2nd Battalion, Canadian Mounted Rifles
- 11th Regiment, Canadian Mounted Rifles

=== 1920s–1930s ===
In the post-war reorganization, the regiment was renamed The British Columbia Mounted Rifles in 1920, and then to the name still carried today, The British Columbia Dragoons in 1929. Part of the reason for the change was to forever divorce the regiment from infantry duties.

=== Second World War ===
When the Second World War loomed, the regiment was designated the 5th Motorcycle Regiment (BCD), and later an armoured car unit. Finally made into an armoured regiment, the 9th Armoured Regiment (BCD), they were deployed to Italy as part of the 5th Armoured Brigade, 5th Canadian (Armoured) Division. The regiment saw heavy action in the Liri Valley, were the first unit to break through the Gustav Line in Italy, 1944, and helped smash the Gothic Line, holding Point 204 right in the centre of the line. They continued to fight until orders were given to move the regiment to North West Europe with the British-led 21st Army Group. They served with distinction until the end of the war, at which point the regiment was demobilized and returned to Militia service.

=== Post war to present ===
The regiment has since seen many ups and downs, with losses of manpower and funding, hostile popular attitudes, and the ever-changing nature of Canada.

The 1970s and 1980s saw the deployment of individual members to Cyprus as part of the UN operations there as part of larger Canadian formations. The 1990s and the new century has seen numerous members deploy to Bosnia as part of NATO operations with the Implementation Force and the Stabilisation Force in Bosnia and Herzegovina. Regimental service personnel served overseas as part of NATO operations with the International Security Assistance Force (to 2014) in Afghanistan, and Operation Impact in the Middle East as well as on Operation Reassurance in Latvia, and on Operation Unifier in Ukraine prior to the 2022 Russian invasion of Ukraine.

== Lineage ==
- Originated on 1 April 1911, in Vernon, British Columbia, as one of two four-squadron regiments designated the British Columbia Horse.
- Reorganized on 1 December 1911, as the 1st Regiment, British Columbia Horse.
- Redesignated on 15 April 1912, as the 30th Regiment, British Columbia Horse.
- Redesignated on 15 March 1920, as The British Columbia Mounted Rifles.
- Redesignated on 15 March 1929, as The British Columbia Dragoons.
- Redesignated on 11 February 1941, as the 2nd (Reserve) Regiment, The British Columbia Dragoons.
- Redesignated on 1 April 1941, as the 9th (Reserve) Armoured Regiment, (The British Columbia Dragoons).
- Redesignated on 1 April 1946, as the 9th Reconnaissance Regiment (The British Columbia Dragoons), RCAC.
- Redesignated on 4 February 1949, as The British Columbia Dragoons (9th Reconnaissance Regiment).
- Redesignated on 19 May 1958, as The British Columbia Dragoons.

=== Lineage chart ===
Lineage chart

1908	B Independent Sqn, The CMR
1910	C Independent Sqn, The CMR
1911	1st Regt, "BC Horse"
1912	30th Regt, BC Horse
1914	2nd Regt, CMR, CEF	Victoria Independent Sqn (Note: Later "Victoria Independent Squadron (British Columbia Horse)")	11th Regt, CMR, CEF
B Sqn and HQ staff, 3rd Regt, CMR, CEF
1916	2nd CMR Bn, CEF	11th "Overseas" CMR Bn, CEF
1917	Absorbed by 24th Reserve Bn
1920	Disbanded	1st Regt (2nd CMR Bn, CEF), The BC Mounted Rifles	2nd Regt (11th CMR Bn, CEF), (Note: Reserve) The BC Mounted Rifles
1926	2nd Regt (11th Regt CMR, CEF), The BC Mounted Rifles
1929	1st Regt (2nd CMR Bn, CEF), The BC Dragoons	2nd Regt (11th Regt CMR, CEF), The BC Dragoons
1936	The BC Dragoons	Disbanded
1940	5th Canadian Motorcycle Regt, CASF (BCD)
1941	The BC Dragoons, CASF	2nd (Reserve) Regt, The BC Dragoons
1941	9th Armd Regt (The BC Dragoons), CASF	9th (Reserve) Armd Regt, (The BC Dragoons)
1943	9th Armd Regt (The BC Dragoons) CAC, CASF
1945	9th Armd Regt (The BC Dragoons) RCAC, CASF
1946	Disbanded	9th Recce Regt (The BC Dragoons), RCAC
1949	The BC Dragoons (9th Recce Regt)
1958	The BC Dragoons

== Official links to other units ==
Alliance
Between Canadian and Commonwealth units
- United Kingdom — The Royal Dragoon Guards
Partnership
Informal bond of friendship between a Canadian unit and a unit from an allied country
- United States — 161st Infantry Regiment

== Battle honours ==
Regimental guidon

Battle honours in small capitals are for large operations and campaigns and those in lowercase are for more specific battles. Bold type indicates honours authorized to be emblazoned on the regimental guidon.

=== Great War ===
- **Mount Sorrel**
- Somme, 1916
- Flers–Courcelette
- Ancre Heights
- **Arras, 1917, '18**
- Vimy, 1917
- Hill 70
- **Ypres, 1917**
- **Passchendaele**
- **Amiens**
- Scarpe, 1918
- Hindenburg Line
- Canal du Nord
- Cambrai, 1918
- **Pursuit to Mons**
- France and Flanders, 1915–18

=== Second World War ===
- **Liri Valley**
- **Melfa Crossing**
- Gothic Line
- **Pozzo Alto Ridge**
- Lamone Crossing
- Naviglio Canal
- Fosso Munio
- Conventello–Comacchio
- Italy, 1944–1945
- **IJsselmeer**
- Delfzijl Pocket
- **North-West Europe, 1945**

=== War in Afghanistan ===
- Afghanistan

== Recognition ==
The camp flag of The British Columbia Dragoons.

The Freedom of the City was granted by the City of Kelowna on February 11, 1963.

The Freedom of the city was exercised by The British Columbia Dragoons in Vernon, British Columbia, on 10 May 2008.

== Cadet units ==
There are several Royal Canadian Army Cadets units spread across British Columbia which are affiliated to the British Columbia Dragoons.

Corps	Location
788 RCACC	Penticton
903 RCACC	Kelowna
1705 RCACC	Vernon
3063 RCACC	Enderby

Cadet units affiliated to the British Columbia Dragoons receive support from the regiment and also are given permission to wear traditional regimental accoutrements on their uniforms.

== Media ==
- Sinews of Steel: The History of the British Columbia Dragoons by R[eginald] H. Roy (1965)

== See also ==
- List of regiments of cavalry of the Canadian Militia (1900–1920)

== Notes ==
Preceded by The King's Own Calgary Regiment (RCAC)	The British Columbia Dragoons	Succeeded by The Fort Garry Horse
