= 16th Canadian Light Horse =

- Active: 1905–1936
- Country: Canada
- Branch: Canadian Militia
- Type: Light cavalry
- Role: Cavalry
- Size: One regiment
- Part of: Non-Permanent Active Militia
- Garrison/HQ: Regina, Saskatchewan
- Mottos: For king and country
- Engagements: First World War
- Battle honours: See #Battle honours

The 16th Canadian Light Horse was a light cavalry regiment of the Non-Permanent Active Militia of the Canadian Militia (now the Canadian Army). First formed in 1905 as the 16th Mounted Rifles, the regiment was Redesignated in 1908 as the 16th Light Horse and again in 1920 as the 16th Canadian Light Horse. In 1936, the regiment was amalgamated with the Saskatchewan Mounted Rifles to form the 16th/22nd Saskatchewan Horse (now part of the North Saskatchewan Regiment).

== Lineage ==
- Originated on 3 July 1905, in Regina, Assiniboia District, North-West Territories, as the 16th Mounted Rifles.
- Redesignated on 1 October 1908, as the 16th Light Horse.
- Redesignated on 15 March 1920, as the 16th Canadian Light Horse.
- Amalgamated on 15 December 1936, with The Saskatchewan Mounted Rifles, and redesignated as the 16th/22nd Saskatchewan Horse.

== Perpetuations ==
=== North-West Rebellion ===
- The Moose Mountain Scouts

=== Great War ===
- The Canadian Light Horse

== History ==
=== Early history ===
On 24 April 1885, The Moose Mountain Scouts were raised for active service for The North West Rebellion. This unit served with the Line of Communication Troops as part of the North West Field Force. On 18 September 1885, the unit was disbanded.

On 3 July 1905, the 16th Mounted Rifles was authorized. Its regimental headquarters was at Regina, and the regiment had squadrons at Moosomin, Moose Jaw and Regina.

On 1 October 1908, the regiment was redesignated as the 16th Light Horse.

=== Great War ===
On 6 August 1914, Details of the 16th Light Horse were placed on active service for local protection duties.

In December 1915, the 16th Light Horse recruited the 3rd Divisional Cavalry Squadron for service with the 3rd Canadian Division along with personnel from the 10th Regiment, Canadian Mounted Rifles. On 19 May 1916, the Canadian Corps Cavalry Regiment was created by the amalgamation of the three divisional cavalry squadrons: the 1st Divisional Cavalry Squadron (19th Alberta Dragoons), the 2nd Divisional Cavalry Squadron (1st Hussars), and the 3rd Divisional Cavalry Squadron (16th Light Horse); with the squadrons becoming “A” Squadron, “B” Squadron and “C” Squadron respectively of the new regiment. On 19 March 1917, the regiment was redesignated as the Canadian Light Horse. The Canadian Light Horse was part of the Canadian Corps in France and Flanders until the end of the war on 11 November 1918. On 15 November 1920, the Canadian Light Horse was disbanded.

=== 1920s–1930s ===
On 15 March 1920, as a result of the reorganization of the Canadian Militia following the Otter Commission, the 16th Light Horse was redesignated as the 16th Canadian Light Horse.

On 15 December 1936, as a result of the 1936 Canadian Militia Reorganization, the 16th Canadian Light Horse was amalgamated with The Saskatchewan Mounted Rifles (formerly the 22nd Saskatchewan Light Horse) to form the 16th/22nd Saskatchewan Horse (now part of the North Saskatchewan Regiment).

== Alliances ==
- United Kingdom - 16th The Queen's Lancers (until 1922)
- United Kingdom - 16th/5th Lancers (1922–1936)

== Uniform ==
The full dress uniform consisted of a scarlet tunic with yellow facings.

== Battle honours ==
=== North West Rebellion ===
- North West Canada, 1885 (Note: Selected to be borne on colours and appointments)

=== Great War ===
- Ypres, 1915
- Festubert, 1915
- Somme, 1916
- Flers-Courcelette
- Ancre Heights
- Arras, 1917, (Note: "Arras, 1917" selected to be borne on colours and appointments) '18
- Vimy, 1917
- Amiens
- Scarpe, 1918
- Drocourt-Quéant
- Hindenburg Line
- Canal du Nord
- Cambrai, 1918
- Pursuit to Mons
- France and Flanders, 1915–'18

== Notable members ==
- Brigadier General George Tuxford, CB CMG DSO ED

== See also ==
- List of regiments of cavalry of the Canadian Militia (1900–1920)
