= 6th Battalion (Fort Garrys), CEF =

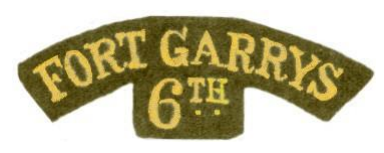
- Battalion cloth tile
- Active: 1914–1918
- Country: Canada
- Branch: Canadian Expeditionary Force
- Size: One battalion
- Engagements: First World War
- Battle honours: The Great War, 1914–15

The 6th Battalion, (Fort Garrys) CEF was a battalion of the Canadian Expeditionary Force during the First World War.

== History ==
The battalion was authorized on 10 August 1914, and embarked for Britain on 29 September 1914. It formed the nucleus of the Remount Depot on 20 January 1915, and the remainder of the battalion's personnel were absorbed by the Canadian Cavalry Depot, CEF, on 6 March 1915 to provide reinforcements for the Canadian Corps in the field. The battalion was disbanded on 5 April 1918.

The band of the 106th Regiment Winnipeg Light Infantry received permission to go overseas with the battalion, and in January 1915 transferred to the 10th Battalion, CEF.

The battalion recruited in Portage la Prairie, Roblin, Pipestone and Winnipeg, Manitoba; Lloydminster, Saskatchewan; and Pincher Creek, Alberta; and was mobilized at Camp Valcartier, Quebec. Most of the recruits came from detachments from at least six different cavalry militia regiments from across Western Canada: the 34th Fort Garry Horse, the 20th Border Horse, the 18th Manitoba Mounted Rifles, the 32nd Manitoba Horse, the 15th Canadian Light Horse from Alberta, and the 22nd Saskatchewan Light Horse.

The 6th Battalion was commanded by Lieutenant-Colonel J. G. Rattray and by Lieutenant-Colonel R. W. Paterson.

== Perpetuations ==
The 6th Battalion, CEF was first perpetuated by The Border Horse.

In 1936, The Border Horse was amalgamated with the 12th Manitoba Dragoons and the perpetuation passed to that regiment. The 12th Manitoba Dragoons have been on the Supplementary Order of Battle since 1964.

== Battle honours ==
In 1929 the battalion was awarded the battle honour "The Great War, 1914–15".

== See also ==
- List of infantry battalions in the Canadian Expeditionary Force

== Sources ==
- Canadian Expeditionary Force 1914-1919 by Col G.W.L. Nicholson, CD, Queens's Printer, Ottawa, Ontario, 1962
