= Charles Arkoll Boulton =

Canadian politician

The Honourable Charles Arkoll Boulton
- Major Charles A. Boulton, 1885

Canadian Senator from Manitoba
- In office December 10, 1889 – May 15, 1899
- Appointed by: John A. Macdonald

Personal details
- Born: April 17, 1841 Cobourg, Canada West
- Died: May 15, 1899 (aged 58) Russell, Manitoba, Canada
- Party: Liberal-Conservative

Military service
- Branch/service: British Army (1858-1868); Canadian Militia (1868-1869, 1885)
- Years of service: 1858 - 1885
- Rank: Captain (British Army); Lieutenant Colonel (Canadian Militia)
- Unit: 100th Regiment of Foot; 46th East Durham Battalion
- Commands: Boulton's Scouts
- Battles/wars: North-West Rebellion; Battle of Fish Creek; Battle of Batoche

Charles Arkoll Boulton (April 17, 1841 – May 15, 1899) was a Canadian army officer and politician.

== Biography ==
He was born in Cobourg, Canada West in 1841, son of D’Arcy Edward Boulton and Emily Heath. His father was a militiaman and politician and his great-grandfathers were D'Arcy Boulton and Christopher Robinson. Charles Boulton was educated at Upper Canada College.

He was commissioned on 23 June 1858 into the British Army as an Ensign with the 100th Regiment of Foot. He was promoted to lieutenant on 25 May 1861 and he purchased a captaincy on 15 June 1866. He served four years in Gibraltar, briefly in Malta and two years in Montreal. He sold his commission in the British Army in 1868, and he became a Major in the Canadian Militia with the 46th East Durham Battalion of Infantry.

In 1869, he was part of a survey party sent to the Red River Colony. On the orders of survey party leader, John Stoughton Dennis, he organized a group of volunteers to try to put down an uprising by Louis Riel. When 50 of his volunteers were captured and imprisoned, he left the colony and went to Portage la Prairie. He met some people who had escaped there and led an attempt to free the remaining captives. They were taken captive by Riel's Métis. Boulton was sentenced to death, but was later released and returned to Ontario.

Boulton operated a sawmill near Lakefield, Ontario, where he became a municipal councillor and then reeve. When his business failed in 1877, he settled in the Shell River valley of Manitoba. He became the first warden of Russell County and chairman of the judicial board for the western district in 1881.

In 1885, he commanded a troop of militia cavalry known as Boulton's Scouts to help put down the North-West Rebellion. He was appointed to the Senate of Canada in 1889.

He died in Russell, Manitoba in 1899.
