= Fort Garry Horse =

The Fort Garry Horse
- The Fort Garry Horse badge
- Active: 1912–present
- Country: Canada
- Branch: Canadian Army
- Role: Armoured reconnaissance
- Part of: 38 Canadian Brigade Group
- Garrison/HQ: Lieutenant-Colonel Harcus Strachan, VC MC Armoury (formerly McGregor Armoury), 551 Machray Avenue, Winnipeg
- Nickname: The Garrys
- Mottos: Facta non verba (Latin for 'deeds, not words')
- March: "El Abanico" (quick), "Red River Valley" (slow), alternate quick march: "St. Patrick's Day"
- Engagements: First World War; Second World War; War in Afghanistan
- Battle honours: See #Battle honours
- Website: canada.ca/en/army/corporate/3-canadian-division/the-fort-garry-horse.html

Insignia
- NATO Map Symbol

The Fort Garry Horse is a Canadian Army Reserve armoured regiment based in Winnipeg, Manitoba, Canada. It is part of 3rd Canadian Division's 38 Canadian Brigade Group. It traces its history to a cavalry regiment first formed in 1912 that first took up the name "Fort Garry" a year afterwards. Since that time the regiment has served in the First World War, sending men to battalions of the Canadian Expeditionary Force, and as an armoured regiment in the Second World War.

== Lineage ==
=== Boulton's Mounted Infantry ===
A unit named Boulton's Mounted Infantry was established in 1885. It was mobilized for active service on 10 April 1885 against the North-West Rebellion, and served with Middleton's Column of the North West Field Force until it was disbanded on 18 September 1885. In 1932, the Manitoba Horse was granted the status of perpetuating Boulton's Mounted Infantry (see below).

=== Fort Garry Horse ===
The Fort Garry Horse itself originated in Winnipeg on 15 April 1912, as the 34th Regiment of Cavalry. The following year it was re-designated the 34th Fort Garry Horse on 2 January 1913 and The Fort Garry Horse following the First World War on 15 March 1920. Winnipeg had originally been established as the expansionary outpost Fort Garry. On 15 December 1936, it was amalgamated with the Manitoba Horse. During the Second World War it was mobilized in the Canadian Active Service Force as a reconnaissance unit for the 2nd Canadian Infantry Division. The Fort Garry Horse, C.A.S.F., was later removed from the 2nd Division and converted to an armoured unit with the designation 10th Canadian Armoured Regiment (Fort Garry Horse). The Non-Permanent Active Militia component remaining in Canada was re-designated the 2nd Regiment, the Fort Garry Horse on 13 August 1940 and the 10th (Reserve) Armoured Regiment, (The Fort Garry Horse), on 1 April 1941. After the Second World War it was re-designated as the 10th Armoured Regiment (The Fort Garry Horse), on 31 January 1946, as The Fort Garry Horse (10th Armoured Regiment), on 4 February 1949; The Fort Garry Horse on 19 May 1958, the 2nd Fort Garry Horse on 11 October 1958, The Fort Garry Horse (Militia) on 1 January 1960 and finally The Fort Garry Horse on 16 June 1970, following the reduction to nil strength of the Regular Force regiment.

=== Manitoba Horse ===
The Manitoba Horse originated in Roblin, Manitoba on 1 April 1912, as the 32nd Light Horse. It was re-designated the 32nd Manitoba Horse on 2 November 1912 and, following the Great War as The Manitoba Horse on 15 March 1920. On 15 December 1936, it was amalgamated with the Fort Garry Horse.

=== Postwar ===
On 11 October 1958, a Regular Force component was authorized as the 1st Fort Garry Horse. On 1 January 1960, it was re-designated The Fort Garry Horse. The regiment served in Canada, on NATO duty in West Germany and on United Nations duty in the Sinai and Cyprus. The Regular Force regiment was reduced to nil strength and placed on the Supplementary Order of Battle on 16 June 1970.

The regimental guidon was presented to the 2nd Fort Garry Horse (Militia) in 1963 and 1st Fort Garry Horse (Regular) in 1964. When the regular force unit was disbanded, their Guidon was presented to the Lieutenant Governor of Manitoba for safekeeping. It remains on display in the Manitoba Legislative Building. The Guidon presented in 1963 is kept and still used by the unit.

In 2003, the regiment began hosting personnel to help create a new unit of the Canadian Military Engineers. On 14 April 2012, during the 100th anniversary celebrations of the FGH, the Engineer Squadron was stood up as 31 Engineer Squadron, part of 38 Combat Engineer Regiment. During their time as a sub-unit of the FGH, the engineers had the distinction of being the only reservists in Canada to wear the black beret of the Royal Canadian Armoured Corps with the cap badge of the Canadian Military Engineers. As of 2015, they wear the green beret in common with other engineer units.

The unit uses Mercedes Benz G-Wagon LUVW scout cars for reconnaissance vehicles and the Textron Tactical Armoured Patrol Vehicle (TAPV).

=== Lineage chart ===
Lineage chart

1885	Boulton's Mounted Corps (Note: Active service)
1885	Disbanded
1912	32nd Light Horse	34th Regt of Cavy
1912	32nd Manitoba Horse
1913	34th "Fort Garry Horse"
1916	226th "Overseas" Bn, CEF	The Fort Garry Horse, CEF
1917	Absorbed by 14th Reserve Bn	34th Fort Garry Horse Overseas Training Depot, CEF
1917	34th Fort Garry Horse, Depot Sqn, CEF
1920	1st Regt, The Manitoba Horse	Disbanded	Disbanded	1st Regt, The Fort Garry Horse
1931	1st Regt (226th Bn, CEF), The Manitoba Horse
1932	Perpetuates Boulton's Mounted Corps
1936	The Fort Garry Horse
1939	The Fort Garry Horse, CASF
1940	The Fort Garry Horse, CASF	2nd Regt, The Fort Garry Horse
1941	10th Armd Regt (The Fort Garry Horse), CASF	10th (Reserve) Armd Regt (The Fort Garry Horse)
1943	10th Armd Regt (The Fort Garry Horse), CAC, CASF
1945	10th Armd Regt (The Fort Garry Horse), RCAC, CASF
1946	Disbanded	10th Armd Regt (The Fort Garry Horse)
1949	The Fort Garry Horse (10th Armd Regt)
1958	The Fort Garry Horse
1958	The 1st Fort Garry Horse (Note: Regular Force)	The 2nd Fort Garry Horse
1960	The Fort Garry Horse	The Fort Garry Horse (Militia)
1970	Supplementary Order of Battle	The Fort Garry Horse

== Operational history ==
=== Great War ===
The FGH's Great War Canadian Cavalry Brigade identifying flash.

Details from the 32nd Manitoba Horse and the 34th Fort Garry Horse were placed on active service on 6 August 1914 for local protection duties.

The 6th Battalion, Canadian Expeditionary Force, was organized in Winnipeg in August 1914. 10 officers and 224 men of the 34th FGH joined the battalion as well as members of the 20th Border Horse, 18th Mounted Rifles, 32nd Manitoba Horse, 15th Canadian Light Horse, and 22nd Saskatchewan Light Horse. The 6th battalion proceeded to England with the First Contingent in October 1914 and was part of the 2nd Brigade of the 1st Canadian Infantry Division, CEF. In March 1915, the 6th Battalion was removed from the 1st Canadian Division and re-roled to form the Canadian Cavalry Depot, to support the Canadian Cavalry Brigade in France. The Canadian Cavalry Depot would provide the officers and men for the Fort Garry Horse CEF. Despite its connection with the 34th FGH, and FGH (CEF), the 6th Battalion was not perpetuated by the unit after the war. The perpetuation went to the Border Horse and is held by the XII Manitoba Dragoons, now on the Supplementary Order of Battle.

The Fort Garry Horse, CEF, was organized in England on 21 January 1916. It disembarked in France on 25 February 1916, where it fought in France and Flanders as part of the Canadian Cavalry Brigade until the end of the war. The regiment was disbanded on 6 November 1920. Harcus Strachan of the regiment was awarded the Victoria Cross for his actions at the battle of Cambrai on November 20, 1917, in France.

The regiment also mobilized the 34th Fort Garry Horse Overseas Training Depot, CEF, on 15 June 1917. It was re-designated the 34th Fort Garry Horse, Depot Squadron, CEF, on 1 January 1917 and embarked for Britain on 21 May 1917, where it provided reinforcements to the Canadian Corps in the field. The squadron was disbanded on 6 November 1920.

The 226th Battalion (Men of the North), CEF, was authorized on 15 July 1916 and embarked for Britain on 16 December 1916, where its personnel were absorbed by the 14th Reserve Battalion, CEF on 7 April 1917 to provide reinforcements for the Canadian Corps in the field. The battalion was disbanded on 27 July 1917. The Fort Garry Horse perpetuates both Boulton's Mounted Infantry of 1885 and the 226th Battalion.

=== Second World War ===
The camp flag of the Fort Garry Horse.

The regiment mobilized The Fort Garry Horse, CASF, on 1 September 1939. It was re-designated as the 10th Armoured Regiment (The Fort Garry Horse), CASF, on 11 February 1941, the 10th Armoured Regiment (The Fort Garry Horse), CAC, CASF, on 15 October 1943 and the 10th Armoured Regiment (The Fort Garry Horse), RCAC, CASF, on 2 August 1945. The regiment embarked for Britain in November 1941.

The regiment landed in Normandy on 6 June 1944, as a part of the 2nd Canadian Armoured Brigade, in support of the 8th Canadian Infantry Brigade, 3rd Canadian Infantry Division, and fought in North-West Europe until the end of the war. The overseas regiment was disbanded on 31 January 1946.

== Alliances ==
- United Kingdom - The Royal Dragoon Guards

== Battle honours ==
The guidon of the Fort Garry Horse.

In the list below, battle honours in small capitals were awarded for participation in large operations and campaigns, while those in lowercase indicate honours granted for more specific battles. Battle honours in bold type are emblazoned on the guidon. The battle honours Fish Creek, Batoche, North West Canada, 1885, Hill 70, Ypres, 1917, and Arras, 1918, are by amalgamation with the Manitoba Horse in 1936.

North West Rebellion

- **Fish Creek**
- **Batoche**
- **North West Canada, 1885**

Great War

- **Somme 1916, '18**
- **Bazentin**
- **Pozières**
- **Flers-Courcelette**
- Hill 70
- Ypres, 1917
- **Cambrai 1917, '18**
- **St. Quentin**
- **Amiens**
- Arras, 1918
- **Hindenburg Line**
- St. Quentin Canal
- **Beaurevoir**
- Pursuit to Mons
- **France and Flanders, 1916–18**

Second World War

- **Normandy Landing**
- Caen
- **Carpiquet**
- Falaise
- **Falaise Road**
- **The Laison**
- **Boulogne, 1944**
- **Antwerp-Turnhout Canal**
- **The Scheldt**
- **Woensdrecht**
- The Rhineland
- Goch-Calcar Road
- **The Hochwald**
- **Groningen**
- Oldenburg
- North-West Europe 1944–1945

War in Afghanistan

- **Afghanistan**

The regiment's facings are yellow.

== Armoury ==
The Fort Garry Horse and the regimental museum are located in Lieutenant-Colonel Harcus Strachan, VC, MC Armoury (formerly called McGregor Armoury) at 551 Machray Avenue, Winnipeg, Manitoba. Designed by Herbert E. Matthews it is drill hall with Tudor-Revival façades built in 1914–1915. The building was recognized in the Register of the Government of Canada Heritage Buildings in 1994.

=== Memorial wall ===
Dedicated on 12 November 1995 to members of the Fort Garry Horse who have died on active service, a memorial wall incorporates the battle honours, the names of the deceased members (with the date of their death), an inscription, the regimental Guidon (Fort Garry gate and the regimental motto), and the cap badges used in 1914 and 1939.

A wall hanging in the Warrant Officer's and Sergeant's Mess incorporates two lances; the regimental cap badge; the regimental motto and the battle honours won during the North West Rebellion and the First and Second World Wars.

=== Monument at Masnières, France ===
On June 11, 2004, during a visit by Fort Garry Horse, a monumental stone was unveiled at Masnières, Northern France, to commemorate the charge by 'B' Squadron on 20 November 1917, the opening day of the Battle of Cambrai, and the actions of Lieut. Harcus Strachan during the charge, which earned him the Victoria Cross.

=== Plaques ===
Donated in May 1970, a plaque is dedicated to the members of the Fort Garry Horse who participated in the liberation of The Netherlands in 1944–45.

A plaque was dedicated to the members of the regiment who participated in the Normandy landings and the liberation of Bernières-sur-Mer in France.

A replica of a cairn at Saint Aubin-sur-Mer, dedicated to members of the Fort Garry Horse who landed on the beaches of Normandy on 6 June 1944, was constructed for the regiment in 1965.

=== Windows ===
Stained glass windows were removed from the regimental church in Hemer, West Germany, and transported to Winnipeg as a memorial to the regiment's service in Europe from 1962 to 1966.

=== Vehicles ===
A Lynx reconnaissance vehicle, which was used in the Canadian military as an armoured reconnaissance and command vehicle, is on the grounds.

A Sherman M4A2, 76mm (W) HVSS tank which was used by Fort Garry Horse from 1946 to 1969 is on the grounds of the Armoury.

A LAV III armoured personnel carrier.

== Order of precedence ==
Preceded by The British Columbia Dragoons	The Fort Garry Horse	Succeeded by Le Régiment de Hull (RCAC)

== See also ==
- List of regiments of cavalry of the Canadian Militia (1900–1920)
- List of mounted regiments in the Canadian Expeditionary Force
- Military history of Canada
- History of the Canadian Army
- Canadian Forces
- List of armouries in Canada
- Winnie-the-Pooh was inspired by the bear acquired by Lt. Harry Colebourn, Veterinary Officer of the FGH before the war. See Winnipeg the Bear.
