= List of regiments of cavalry of the Canadian Militia (1900–1920) =

This is a list of the named and numbered cavalry regiments of the Canadian Militia from around the start of 1900 until the Otter Commission reforms in 1920.

The full list is as follows:

== Permanent Active Militia (Permanent Force) ==
Number	Title	Formed	Changes	Post 1920	Present successor
1	The Royal Canadian Dragoons	1883	N/A	The Royal Canadian Dragoons	Extant
2	Lord Strathcona's Horse (Royal Canadians)	1901 (as A Squadron, Canadian Mounted Rifles)	1903 (The Royal Canadian Mounted Rifles); 1909 (Strathcona's Horse (Royal Canadians)); 1911 (Lord Strathcona's Horse (Royal Canadians))	Lord Strathcona's Horse (Royal Canadians)	Extant

== Non-Permanent Active Militia ==
Number	Title	Formed	Changes	Post 1920	Present successor
1	The Governor General's Body Guard	1822	N/A	The Governor General's Body Guard	The Governor General's Horse Guards
2	1st Hussars	1856	N/A	1st Hussars	Extant
3	2nd Dragoons	1872	N/A	2nd Dragoons	57th Field Artillery Regiment (2nd/10th Dragoons), RCA
4	3rd Prince of Wales' Canadian Dragoons	1875	N/A	3rd Prince of Wales' Canadian Dragoons	50th Field Artillery Regiment (The Prince of Wales Rangers), RCA
5	4th Hussars	1875	N/A	4th Hussars	4th Princess Louise Dragoon Guards
6	5th Dragoons	1877	1901 (Amalgamated into 6th Duke of Connaught's Royal Canadian Hussars)	6th Duke of Connaught's Royal Canadian Hussars	The Royal Canadian Hussars (Montreal)
7	5th Princess Louise Dragoon Guards	1872	January 1903 (Full Regimental Status); February 1903 (5th Princess Louise Dragoon Guards)	The Princess Louise Dragoon Guards	4th Princess Louise Dragoon Guards
8	6th Duke of Connaught's Royal Canadian Hussars	1879	1901 (Amalgamated with 5th Dragoons)	6th Duke of Connaught's Royal Canadian Hussars	The Royal Canadian Hussars (Montreal)
9	7th Hussars	1903	N/A	7th Hussars	Sherbrooke Hussars
10	8th Princess Louise's New Brunswick Hussars	1848	N/A	8th Princess Louise's New Brunswick Hussars	8th Canadian Hussars (Princess Louise's)
11	9th Mississauga Horse	1901 (as Toronto Mounted Rifles)	1903 (9th Toronto Light Horse); 1905 (9th Mississauga Horse)	The Ontario Mounted Rifles	The Governor General's Horse Guards
12	10th Queen's Own Canadian Hussars	1856 (as The Queen's Own Canadian Hussars)	1903 (10th Queen's Own Canadian Hussars); 1913 (Disbanded)	N/A	N/A
13	11th Hussars	1903	N/A	11th Hussars	Sherbrooke Hussars
14	12th Manitoba Dragoons	1903	N/A	12th Manitoba Dragoons	12th Manitoba Dragoons
15	13th Scottish Light Dragoons	1904	N/A	13th Scottish Light Dragoons	N/A
16	14th King's Canadian Hussars	1874	1903 (King's Canadian Hussars - Full Regimental Status); 1904 (14th King's Canadian Hussars)	The King's (Nova Scotia) Mounted Rifles	87th Field Battery, RCA 88th Field Battery, RCA
17	15th Light Horse	1905	N/A	15th Canadian Light Horse	South Alberta Light Horse
18	16th Light Horse	1905 (as 16th Mounted Rifles)	N/A	16th Canadian Light Horse	The North Saskatchewan Regiment
19	The 17th Duke of York's Royal Canadian Hussars "Argenteuil Rangers"	1897	1907 (Full Regimental Status - 17th Duke of York's Royal Canadian Hussars); 1912 (The 17th Duke of York's Royal Canadian Hussars (Argenteuil Rangers)	17th Duke of York's Royal Canadian Hussars	The Royal Canadian Hussars (Montreal)
20	18th Manitoba Mounted Rifles	1907	N/A	The Manitoba Mounted Rifles	118th Medium Battery, RCA
21	19th Alberta Dragoons	1908 (as 19th Alberta Mounted Rifles)	1911 (19th Alberta Dragoons)	19th Alberta Dragoons	South Alberta Light Horse
22	20th Border Horse	1908 (as 20th Mounted Rifles)	1910 (20th Border Horse)	The Border Horse	12th Manitoba Dragoons
23	21st Alberta Hussars	1908	N/A	The Alberta Mounted Rifles	South Alberta Light Horse
24	22nd Saskatchewan Light Horse	1908 (as Saskatchewan Light Horse)	April 1908 (22nd Saskatchewan Light Horse)	The Saskatchewan Mounted Rifles	The North Saskatchewan Regiment
25	23rd Alberta Rangers	1906 (as The Alberta Rangers)	1908 (23rd Alberta Rangers)	The Alberta Mounted Rifles	South Alberta Light Horse
26	24th Regiment Grey's Horse	1908	N/A	9th (Grey's) Horse	N/A
27	25th Brant Dragoons	1909	N/A	10th Brant Dragoons	57th Field Artillery Regiment (2nd/10th Dragoons), RCA
28	26th Stanstead Dragoons	1910 (as 26th Canadian Horse (Stanstead Dragoons))	1912 (26th Stanstead Dragoons)	The Eastern Townships Mounted Rifles	27th Field Artillery Regiment, RCA
29	27th Light Horse	1910	N/A	14th Canadian Light Horse	14th Canadian Hussars
30	28th New Brunswick Dragoons	1911	N/A	The New Brunswick Dragoons	The Royal New Brunswick Regiment
31	29th Light Horse	1911	N/A	18th Canadian Light Horse	65th Field Battery, RCA
32	30th Regiment British Columbia Horse	1908 (as British Columbia Horse)	1911 (1st Regiment, British Columbia Horse); 1912 (30th Regiment British Columbia Horse)	The British Columbia Mounted Rifles	The British Columbia Dragoons
33	31st Regiment British Columbia Horse	1908 (as British Columbia Horse)	1911 (2nd Regiment, British Columbia Horse); 1912 (31st Regiment British Columbia Horse)	5th British Columbia Light Horse	
34	32nd Manitoba Horse	1912 (as 32nd Light Horse)	November 1912 (32nd Manitoba Horse)	The Manitoba Horse	The Fort Garry Horse
35	33rd Vaudreuil & Soulanges Hussars	1912	1914 (Disbanded)	N/A	N/A
36	34th Fort Garry Horse	1912 (as 34th Regiment of Cavalry)	1913 (34th Fort Garry Horse)	The Fort Garry Horse	The Fort Garry Horse
37	35th Central Alberta Horse	1913	N/A	N/A	N/A
38	36th Prince Edward Island Light Horse	1901 (as L Squadron, Prince Edward Island Mounted Rifles)	October 1901 (L Squadron, Canadian Mounted Rifles); 1903 (Prince Edward Island Light Horse); February 1914 (Full Regimental Status); April 1914 (36th Prince Edward Island Light Horse)	The Prince Edward Island Light Horse	The Prince Edward Island Regiment (RCAC)
39	Victoria Independent Squadron	1914	N/A	The British Columbia Mounted Rifles	The British Columbia Dragoons
