= 89th Battalion (Alberta), CEF =

89th "Overseas" Battalion, CEF
- Active: 1915–1917
- Disbanded: 1917
- Country: Canada
- Branch: Canadian Expeditionary Force
- Type: Infantry
- Battle honours: The Great War, 1916

Commanders
- Commanding officer: Lt-Col W.W. Nasmyth

The 89th Battalion (Alberta), CEF, was an infantry battalion of the Great War Canadian Expeditionary Force. The 89th Battalion was authorized on 22 December 1915 and embarked for Britain on 2 June 1916, where its personnel were absorbed by the 9th Reserve Battalion, CEF, to provide reinforcements for the Canadian Corps in the field. The battalion disbanded on 21 May 1917.

The battalion recruited throughout Alberta and was mobilized at Calgary.

Once placed on active service, the battalion was commanded by Lieutenant-Colonel W.W. Nasmyth from 2 June 1916 to 1 August 1916.

The battalion was awarded the battle honour The Great War, 1916.

The perpetuation of the 89th Battalion, CEF, was assigned in 1924 to the 2nd Battalion, the Calgary Regiment. This regiment, now the King's Own Calgary Regiment (RCAC), continues to perpetuate the 89th Battalion.

== Sources ==
Canadian Expeditionary Force 1914–1919 by Col. G.W.L. Nicholson, CD, Queen's Printer, Ottawa, Ontario, 1962

Dorosh, Michael A. Calgary's Infantry Regiment: A Pictorial History of The Calgary Highlanders (Calgary Highlanders Regimental Funds Foundation, 2024). ISBN 9780969461647
