= John MacGregor (VC) =

Recipient of the Victoria Cross

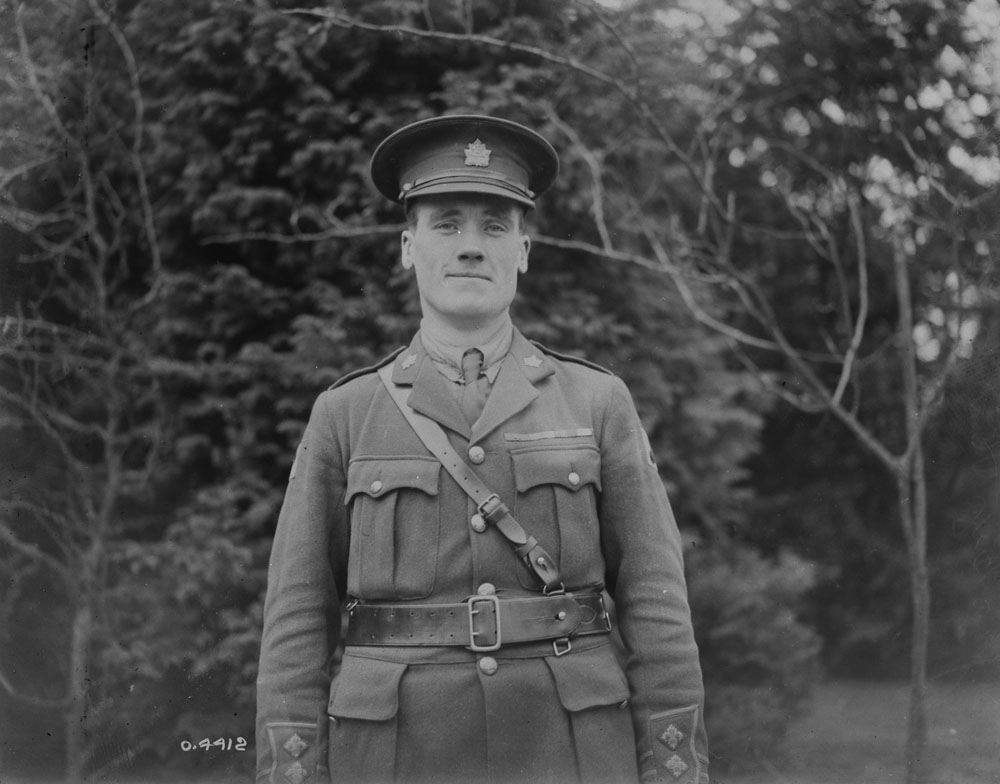
- MacGregor in 1919
- Born: 11 February 1889; Cawdor, Scotland
- Died: 9 June 1952 (aged 63); Powell River, British Columbia, Canada
- Burial place: Cranberry Lake Cemetery, Powell River
- Military career
- Allegiance: Canada
- Branch: Canadian Expeditionary Force
- Service years: 1915 - 1919, 1940 - 1946
- Rank: Lieutenant Colonel
- Units: 2nd Regiment, Canadian Mounted Rifles
- Commands: 2nd Battalion, The Canadian Scottish Regiment (Princess Mary's)
- Conflicts: First World War; Second World War
- Awards: Victoria Cross; Military Cross & Bar; Distinguished Conduct Medal; Canadian Efficiency Decoration

John MacGregor VC MC & Bar DCM ED (1 February 1889 – 9 June 1952) was a Scottish-Canadian soldier. MacGregor was a recipient of the Victoria Cross, the highest and most prestigious award for gallantry in the face of the enemy that can be awarded to British and Commonwealth forces. MacGregor served in the Canadian army in both world wars.

== Details ==
Macgregor was born in Cawdor near Nairn, Scotland in 1889 and moved to Canada in 1909. He served in the army from 1915 to 1919. MacGregor was 29 years old, and a temporary captain in the 2nd Regiment, Canadian Mounted Rifles, Canadian Expeditionary Force during the First World War when the following deed during the Battle of the Canal du Nord took place for which he was awarded the Victoria Cross.

During the period 29 September/3 October 1918 near Cambrai, France, Captain MacGregor acted with most conspicuous bravery and leadership. He led his company under intense fire, and although wounded, located and put out of action enemy machine-guns which were checking progress, killing four and taking eight prisoners. He then reorganised his command under heavy fire and in the face of stubborn resistance continued the advance. Later, after a personal daylight reconnaissance under heavy fire, he established his company in Neuville St. Remy, thereby greatly assisting the advance into Tilloy.

== Freemasonry ==
He was initiated into Freemasonry in Tyee Lodge, No.66, (Prince Rupert, British Columbia) on 20 March 1920, Passed on 29 September 1920 and Raised on 8 March 1921. After serving during WWII he joined Westview Lodge, No.133, (Powell River, British Columbia) on 2 May 1950.

== Further information ==
MacGregor served again from 1940 to 1946, achieving the rank of lieutenant colonel commanding the 2nd The Canadian Scottish Regiment (Princess Mary's). He is buried at Cranberry Lake Cemetery, Powell River, British Columbia.

His biography was published under the title MacGregor V.C..

MacGregor's Victoria Cross and other medals are on display at the Canadian War Museum in Ottawa, Ontario.
