= 226th Battalion (Men of the North), CEF =

226th "Overseas" Battalion, CEF
- Active: 1916–1917
- Disbanded: 1917
- Country: Canada
- Branch: Canadian Expeditionary Force
- Type: Infantry
- Mobilization headquarters: Dauphin, Manitoba
- Battle honours: The Great War, 1916–17

The 226th Battalion, CEF was a unit in the Canadian Expeditionary Force during the First World War.

== History ==
Based in Dauphin, Manitoba, the unit began recruiting in March 1916 in the area of Dauphin and Minnedosa, Manitoba. After sailing to England in December 1916, the battalion was absorbed into the 14th Reserve Battalion on April 7, 1917. The 226th Battalion, CEF had one Officer Commanding: Lieut-Col. R. A. Gillespie.

== Battle honours ==
In 1929, the battalion was awarded the theatre of war honour "The Great War, 1916–17".

== Perpetuation ==
The 226th Battalion is perpetuated by The Fort Garry Horse, the 49th Field Artillery Regiment, RCA, and The Royal Winnipeg Rifles.
