= 2nd Battalion, Canadian Mounted Rifles =

- The distinguishing battle patch of the 2nd Battalion, Canadian Mounted Rifles, CEF
- Active: November 1901–31 May 1902; 7 November 1914–6 November 1920
- Country: Canada
- Branch: Canadian Expeditionary Force (1914–1919)
- Type: Mounted infantry (1901–1902, 1914–1916); Infantry (1916–1920)
- Part of: 1st Canadian Mounted Rifles Brigade (1914–1916); 8th Canadian Infantry Brigade (1916–1918)
- Engagements: Second Boer War; First World War

The 2nd Canadian Mounted Rifles Battalion, (known colloquially as the 2nd Battalion, CMR or simply 2 CMR) a Canadian unit that was raised for the Second Boer War in November 1901. On 7 November 1914, it was re-raised for service in the First World War as the 2nd Regiment, Canadian Mounted Rifles, CEF. The battalion recruited in Victoria and Vernon, British Columbia, and was mobilized in Victoria.

== Boer War ==
In November 1901, the British government requested from the Canadian government a four-squadron regiment of mounted rifles for the Second Boer War. The Canadian Department of Militia and Defence equipped and trained the unit, while the British paid its costs. The majority of the officers and at least a quarter of the men had previously served in South Africa, including its commander Lieutenant-Colonel T.D.B. Evans. On 31 March 1902 the unit fought as part of an outnumbered British force at the Battle of Hart's River, or Boschbult. The unit participated in a number of other drives to round up Boers before the war ended on 31 May 1902.

== World War I ==
The 2nd Regiment, Canadian Mounted Rifles was mobilized on 15 March 1915, at Willows Camp, Victoria. Most of their recruits came from the local militia cavalry units: the 30th British Columbia Horse and the Victoria Squadron of Horse.

The regiment embarked for Great Britain on 12 June 1915. It disembarked in France on 22 September 1915 as part of the 1st Canadian Mounted Rifles Brigade. On 1 January 1916 it was converted to infantry, amalgamated with 'B Squadron' and the headquarters staff of the 3rd Regiment, Canadian Mounted Rifles, and re-designated the 2nd Canadian Mounted Rifles Battalion, CEF. It fought as part of the 8th Canadian Infantry Brigade, 3rd Canadian Division in France and Flanders until the end of the war.

The battalion was disbanded on 6 November 1920.

== Commanding officers ==
- Lieutenant-Colonel T.D.B. Evans, November 1901 – 31 May 1902
- Lieutenant-Colonel J. C. L. Bott, 12 June 1915 – 27 November 1916
- Lieutenant-Colonel G. C. Johnston, 27 November 1916–demobilization

== Battle honours ==
- Mount Sorrel
- Somme, 1916
- Flers-Courcelette
- Ancre Heights
- Arras, 1917, '18
- Vimy, 1917
- Hill 70
- Ypres, 1917
- Passchendaele
- Amiens
- Scarpe, 1918
- Hindenburg Line
- Canal du Nord
- Cambrai, 1918
- Pursuit to Mons
- France and Flanders, 1915–18

== Awards ==
Capt. John MacGregor was awarded the Victoria Cross for his actions during the Battle of the Canal du Nord from 29 September to 3 October 1918.

== Perpetuation ==
The 2nd Canadian Mounted Rifles Battalion is perpetuated by The British Columbia Dragoons.

== See also ==
- Canadian Mounted Rifles
- List of mounted regiments in the Canadian Expeditionary Force
- List of infantry battalions in the Canadian Expeditionary Force

== Sources ==
- Canadian Expeditionary Force 1914-1919 by Col. G.W.L. Nicholson, CD, Queen's Printer, Ottawa, Ontario, 1962
