= Battle of Valenciennes (1918) =

Battle of World War I in France

Coordinates: 50°21′29″N 03°31′24″E

- Part of the Western Front in the European theatre of World War I, Hundred Days Offensive
Date	28 October - 2 November 1918
Location	Valenciennes, France
Result	Canadian victory

Belligerents
Canada	Germany

Commanders and leaders
(Canada) Arthur Currie	(German Empire) Unknown

Casualties and losses
80 dead 300 wounded	800 dead 1,800 surrendered

The Battle of Valenciennes was part of the Hundred Days Offensive at the end of World War I. The battle took place during the final phase of the Great War, from 28 October to 2 November 1918 and saw the Canadian Corps re-capture the northern French city of Valenciennes and surrounding areas from the German Army.

== Summary ==
=== Background ===
Valenciennes had been captured by Germany's invading army in the Schlieffen Plan Offensive on 26 August 1914 and remained in German hands, well behind the lines (at least 30 kilometres) for the entire war. By late October 1918, it was the last major French city under German control.

In September and October, the last of the German Army's major organized defensive networks in northern France, the Hindenburg Line, had been overwhelmed with the Allies breaking through, and the fighting had transitioned from trench war to more open, improvised manoeuvre warfare. The Allied armies had taken to pushing and pursuing the Germans who were engaging in a fighting retreat. In the local theatre of battle this became known as the "Pursuit to Mons". To rearguard their withdrawal, the Germans had set up their Hermann Line, a combination of organized entrenched and ad-hoc lines of defence in wooded areas, behind rivers and canals and in population centres like villages, cities and towns where organizing and concealing defences was easiest to accomplish. In the vicinity of Valenciennes, the Allies faced such defences behind the Sensée Canal, the Escaut/Scheldt River Canal and the River Selle as they advanced toward Belgium.

=== The battle ===
During this campaign, the Canadian Corps was attached to the British 1st Army and was positioned on the left flank of the attacking forces. As the British formation advanced along an almost 18-kilometre-wide (11 mi) front, the Canadians were tasked with securing and protecting the flank from attack and enfilade. By 27 October the Canadians had swept north to surround the city of Valenciennes, but the German garrison that remained in the city were protected by the Escaut/Schelt River Canal, which they had flooded, saturating the ground to the north and west of the city. To the south, as had been the case at Lens in the summer of 1917, Canadian Corps Commander Arthur Currie and staff observed that the city of Valenciennes was overlooked by a commanding high ground at Mont Houy about 2 kilometres (1.2 mi) south of the city. It was determined that the enemy positions on the high ground should be eliminated first, three days before the assault on the city would commence.

The task of taking Mount Houy was originally delegated to the British 51st Division who were positioned to the right/south of the Canadians. The 51st's assault commenced on 28 October and met strong resistance, which saw them meet only partial success, taking the southern, ascending slopes, but not the heights. This meant that to keep pace with the larger British assaults further south, which were scheduled to begin on 3 November, the Canadians would have to improvise and complete the capture of the heights as the assault on the city itself began on 1 November.

In soggy, rainy weather, the 4th Canadian Division took up positions to the south of the city with the 44th (Manitoba) and 47th (British Columbia) Battalions replacing the British 51st Division men at Mount Huoy on the night of 29 October. They began to reconnoitre the enemy's positions and lines and 303 guns of the Canadian Artillery began bombarding the hill and city around the clock. The bombardment was complicated by the presence of significant numbers of French civilians in the city and surrounding villages and towns and so careful counter battery preparations were taken to locate enemy guns and troop concentrations when in close proximity to civilians. The artillery strikes were decisive and significantly reduced the German artillery support for the defensive lines in the subsequent attacks.

Again in a pouring rain on 1 November, the first phase of the infantry assault on Valenciennes had the 44th Battalion advance up Mount Houy at 05:15, defended on three sides by a creeping barrage and took the Red Line, overwhelming the remaining defenders in 45 minutes despite being forced to use their respirators by gas-shell counter-fire. Demoralized and dispirited by the sustained artillery fire, German soldiers began surrendering en masse. By 10:20, despite being significantly outnumbered, the 46th (South Saskatchewan) and 47th Battalions had advanced to the Blue Line objective on the southern outskirts of the city.

By late morning, the German defence solidified in the south of the city with intensified machine gun fire, particularly in the town of Marly in the southeast outskirts of the city. From the west, the 3rd Canadian Division's 12th Brigade established bridgeheads over the Escaut/Scheldt and pushed into the city on a second axis of attack. By noon Canadian troops were arriving in the centre of town and by the end of the day, the Canadians had swept into the northern fringes of Valenciennes, advancing on the Green Line with the 12th Brigade's 38th (Ottawa) and 72nd (Seaforth Highlanders of Canada) Battalions eliminating the last pockets of the enemy through the night.

The following morning, 2 November, the 54th (Kootenay) Battalion of the 11th Brigade had geared up and advanced on Marly, only to discover the Germans had abandoned their defences during the night. By 08:30 Canadian troops had advanced into the last eastern sections of the city and outskirts and by the end of the day the last remaining German holdouts in Valenciennes had been 'mopped up' and 800 enemy lay dead and 1,800 more enemy soldiers had surrendered.

A vivid account of this battle, from the Maresches section of the eleven-mile front, is provided by Private A S Bullock in his wartime memoir.

== Heroism ==
Sergeant Hugh Cairns, of the 46th Battalion was posthumously awarded the Victoria Cross for conspicuous bravery during the fighting in the approach to the Blue Line in the south of the city. On 1 November, Cairns single-handedly captured two machine guns, killing or capturing their crews, then went on to lead a small contingent on to capture multiple machine and field guns, and despite having been wounded led an advance patrol into Marly, through these actions capturing over 100 enemy soldiers. After having captured 60 prisoners in Marly, he was rushed by a group of about 20 enemy troops and was severely wounded, and died at a nearby medical post the following day Sergeant Cairns is buried just west of the city at Auberchicourt British Cemetery.

“Among others in the battalion, there were six Distinguished Service Orders, 34 Military Crosses, 23 Distinguished Conduct Medals, 227 Military Medals and 27 mention in dispatches.” When the Canadians advanced on Mount Houy, Lieutenant John Wallace Kilpatrick of the 47th Battalion was awarded the Military Cross for conspicuous gallantry and devotion to duty. During the advance on November 1, Kilpatrick successfully led his men under extremely heavy fire after having lost all his officers.

== Commemoration ==
- The Canadian liberation of Valenciennes is recognized with the nearby Bourlon Wood Canadian Memorial at Bourlon just west of Cambrai.
- Sergeant Hugh Cairns' Victoria Cross earning actions are acknowledged with a plaque installed on the side of a building opposite the Place du Canada on the Avenue du Sergent Cairns in Valenciennes.
