= 12th Manitoba Dragoons =

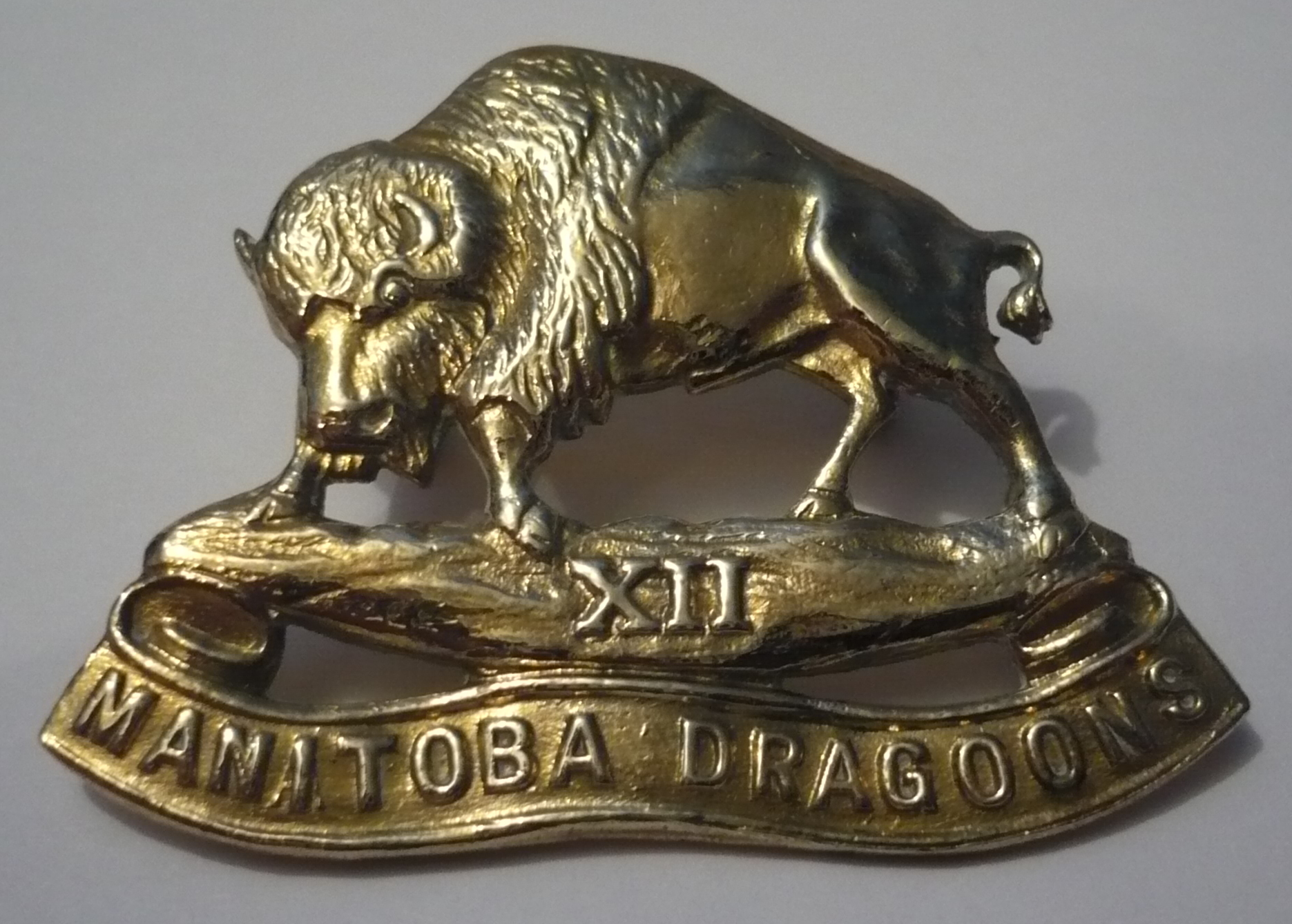
- XII Manitoba Dragoons cap badge
- Active: 1903–1964
- Country: Canada
- Branch: Canadian Army
- Type: Line cavalry
- Role: Armoured reconnaissance
- Part of: Supplementary Order of Battle
- Garrison/HQ: Virden, Manitoba
- Mottos: Ubique honor et equis (Latin for 'Everywhere honour and by horse')
- March: "Colonel Bogey"
- Engagements: North-West Rebellion; Second Boer War; First World War; Second World War
- Battle honours: See #Battle honours

The 12th Manitoba Dragoons is an armoured regiment of the Canadian Army that is currently on the Supplementary Order of Battle.

== Lineage ==
=== 12th Manitoba Dragoons ===
- Originated 1 July 1903 in Brandon, Manitoba, as the 12th "Manitoba Dragoons".
- Amalgamated 31 January 1935 with The Border Horse, retaining its designation as the 12th Manitoba Dragoons.
- Redesignated 7 November 1940 as the 12th (Reserve) Manitoba Dragoons.
- Redesignated 1 April 1946 as the 18th Armoured Car Regiment (12th Dragoons), RCAC.
- Redesignated 4 February 1949 as the 12th Manitoba Dragoons, (18th Armoured Car Regiment).
- Redesignated 1 October 1954 as the 12th Manitoba Dragoons (18th Armoured Regiment).
- Redesignated 19 May 1958 as the 12th Manitoba Dragoons.
- 31 December 1964 reduced to nil strength and transferred to the Supplementary Order of Battle.

=== The Border Horse ===
- Originated 1 April 1908 in Estevan, Saskatchewan, as the 20th Mounted Rifles.
- Redesignated 1 March 1910 as the 20th Border Horse.
- Redesignated 15 March 1920 as The Border Horse.
- Amalgamated 31 January 1935 with the 12th Manitoba Dragoons.

=== Lineage chart ===
Lineage chart

1885
1886
1886
1892
1901
1903
1908
1910
1914
1915
1917
1920
1929
1932
1935
1936
1940
1941
1942
1942
1945
1946
1949
1954
1958
1964

Winnipeg Bn of Infy (Note: Active service April–September)
95th "Winnipeg Bn of Infy"
95th Bn Manitoba Grenadiers
Disbanded into independent coys
Independent sqns of CMR
12th "Manitoba Dragoons"
20th Mounted Rifles
20th Border Horse
32nd Bn, CEF	6th Bn, CEF
32nd Reserve Bn, CEF	Absorbed by Remount Depot and Canadian Cavy Depot
Absorbed by 15th Reserve Bn
2nd Regt, (Note: Reserve) 12th Manitoba Dragoons	1st Regt, 12th Manitoba Dragoons	1st Regt, The Border Horse	2nd Regt, The Border Horse
1st Regt (32nd Bn, CEF), 12th Manitoba Dragoons
Perpetuates 95th Bn	Perpetuates 95th Bn	1st Regt (6th Bn, CEF), The Border Horse
1st Regt (6th Bn, CEF), 12th Manitoba Dragoons	Disbanded
Disbanded	12th Manitoba Dragoons
12th (Reserve) Manitoba Dragoons
18th (Manitoba) Recce Bn, CAC, CASF
18th (Manitoba) Armd Car Regt, CAC, CASF
18th Armd Car Regt (12th Manitoba Dragoons), CAC, CASF
18th Armd Car Regt (12th Manitoba Dragoons), RCAC, CASF
Disbanded	18th Armd Car Regt (12th Dragoons), RCAC
12th Manitoba Dragoons, (18th Armd Car Regt)
12th Manitoba Dragoons (18th Armd Regt)
12th Manitoba Dragoons
Supplementary Order of Battle

== Perpetuations ==
=== North-West Rebellion, 1885 ===
- 95th Battalion, Manitoba Grenadiers

=== The Great War ===
- 6th Battalion (Fort Garrys), CEF
- 32nd Battalion, CEF

== Operational history ==
=== North West Rebellion ===
The 95th Battalion Manitoba Grenadiers was mobilized for active service on 10 April 1885, when "a Battalion at Winnipeg" was authorized to be formed. The battalion served in the Alberta Column of the North West Field Force and was removed from active service on 18 September 1885. The battalion was retained on the Non-Permanent Active Militia order of battle.

=== South African War ===
During the Boer War, The Manitoba Dragoons contributed volunteers for the Canadian contingents in the field.

=== The Great War ===
During the Great War, the Regiment raised two battalions for the Canadian Expeditionary Force.

The 6th Battalion (Fort Garry Horse), CEF was authorized on 10 August 1914, and embarked for Britain on 29 September 1914. It formed the nucleus of the Remount Depot on 20 January 1915, and the remainder of the battalion's personnel were absorbed by the Canadian Cavalry Depot, CEF, on 6 March 1915 to provide reinforcements for the Canadian Corps in the field. The battalion was disbanded on 5 April 1918. The battalion recruited in Portage la Prairie, Roblin, Pipestone and Winnipeg, Manitoba, Lloydminster, Saskatchewan and Pincher Creek, Alberta, and was mobilized at Camp Valcartier, Quebec. The 6th Battalion was awarded the battle honour "THE GREAT WAR 1914-15." The 6th Battalion was commanded by Lt.-Col. J.G. Rattray

The 32nd Battalion, CEF, was authorized on 3 November 1914 and embarked for Britain on 23 February 1915. It was redesignated the 32nd Reserve Battalion, CEF, on 18 April 1915 and on 4 January 1917 its personnel were absorbed by the 15th Reserve Battalion, CEF, to provide reinforcements for Canadian Corps units in the field. The battalion recruited in Manitoba and Saskatchewan and was mobilized at Winnipeg.

The 32nd Battalion had three officers commanding:

- Lt.-Col. H.J. Cowan, 7 March 1915 – 15 September 1915
- Lt.-Col. C.D. MacPherson, 15 September 1915 – 1 August 1916
- Lt.-Col. F.J. Clarke, 2 August 1915 – 2 January 1917

The battalion was awarded the battle honour "THE GREAT WAR 1915-17."

=== The Second World War ===
During the Second World War the Regiment mobilized the 18th (Manitoba) Reconnaissance Battalion, CAC, CASF, for active service on 10 May 1941. It was redesignated the 18th (Manitoba) Armoured Car Regiment, CAC, CASF, on 26 January 1942; the 18th Armoured Car Regiment (12th Manitoba Dragoons), CAC, CASF, on 16 December 1942; and 18th Armoured Car Regiment (12th Manitoba Dragoons), RCAC, CASF on 2 August 1945. It embarked for Great Britain on 19 August 1942. On 8 and 9 July 1944 it landed in Normandy, France as a unit attached directly to II Canadian Corps, where it fought in North-West Europe until the end of the war.

=== Post-1945 ===
The active unit was disbanded on 31 January 1946. The militia regiment was re-activated and was designated the 18th Armoured Car Regiment (12th Dragoons), RCAC on 1 April 1946. The regiment was reduced to nil strength and transferred to the Supplementary Order of Battle on 31 December 1964.

== Organization ==
=== 12th Manitoba Dragoons (01 July, 1903) ===
- Regimental Headquarters (Brandon, Manitoba)
- A Squadron (Virden, Manitoba) (first raised 10 April 1885 as No. 2 Company, Winnipeg Battalion of Infantry; later reorganized as B Squadron, Canadian Mounted Rifles)
- B Squadron (Souris, Manitoba) (first raised 4 January 1889 as No. 6 Company, 91st Battalion Manitoba Light Infantry; later reorganized as C Squadron, Canadian Mounted Rifles)
- C Squadron (Portage la Prairie, Manitoba) (first raised 1 June 1901 as D Squadron, Canadian Mounted Rifles)
- D Squadron (Minnedosa, Manitoba) (first raised 1 June 1901 as E Squadron, Canadian Mounted Rifles)
- E Squadron (Brandon, Manitoba) (first raised 1 June 1901 as F Squadron, Canadian Mounted Rifles)

=== 12th Manitoba Dragoons (31 January 1935) ===
- Regimental Headquarters (Virden, Manitoba)
- A Squadron (Virden, Manitoba)
- B Squadron (Souris, Manitoba)
- C Squadron (Minnedosa, Manitoba)

=== 12th Manitoba Dragoons (1964) ===
- Regimental Headquarters (Virden, Manitoba)
- A Squadron (Minnedosa, Manitoba)
- B Squadron (Virden, Manitoba)
- C Squadron (Neepawa, Manitoba)
- D Squadron (Shoal Lake, Manitoba) (disbanded in 1954)

== Alliances ==
- United Kingdom 12th Royal Lancers (Prince of Wales's) (Until 1960)
- United Kingdom 9th/12th Royal Lancers (Prince of Wales's) (1960-1964)

== Battle honours ==
In the list below, battle honours in capitals were awarded for participation in large operations and campaigns, while those in lowercase indicate honours granted for more specific battles. Those battle honours followed by a "+" are selected for emblazonment on the regimental guidon.

North West Rebellion

- North West Canada, 1885 26 March-12 May 1885

South African War

- South Africa, 1900

The Great War

- Ypres, 1915 22 April-25 May 1915+
- Festubert, 1915 15–25 May 1915+
- Mount Sorrel 2–13 June 1916
- Somme, 1916, '18 1 July-18 November 1916 and 21 March-5 April 1918+
- Cambrai, 1917 20 November 1917 – 3 December 1917+
- Amiens 8–11 August 1918+
- Hindenburg Line 12 September-9 October 1918+
- Pursuit to Mons 28 September-11 November 1918+

The Second World War

- Falaise 7–22 August 1944+
- Falaise Road 7–9 August 1944
- The Laison 14–17 August 1944
- Chambois 18–22 August 1944
- The Rhineland 8 February-10 March 1945+
- Bad Zwischenahn 23 April-4 May 1945
- North-West Europe, 1944–1945+

== Cadet corps ==
2528 Royal Canadian Army Cadet Corps is the only organization that perpetuates the name and insignia of the regiment. The cadet corps formed October 19, 1954, as the Virden Collegiate Cadet Corps affiliated to and using the insignia of the 12th Manitoba Dragoons. When the regiment disbanded the corps affiliation changed to that of the 71st Field Battery and shortly after the 26th Field Regiment, Royal Canadian Artillery. Branch Number 8 of Royal Canadian Legion became sponsor of the corps May 26, 1975, and housed the unit on its premises. October 3, 1994, the corps resumed its original affiliation and was renamed the XII Manitoba Dragoons Cadet Corps. The corps continues to parade in the Virden Legion Hall and is composed of youth from many surrounding communities.

== Photo gallery ==
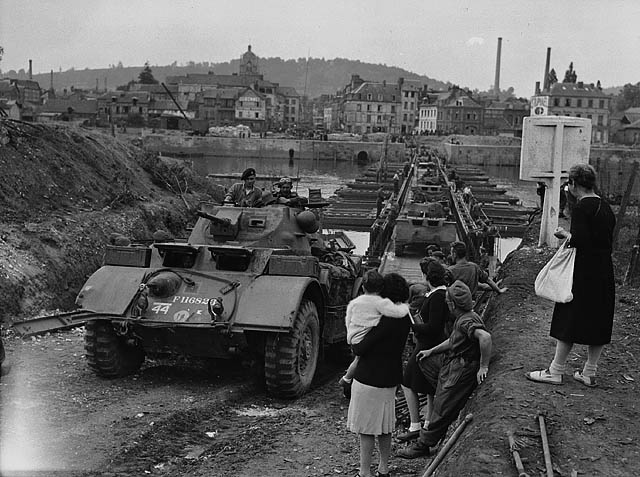
T17E1 Staghound armoured cars of the 18th Armoured Car Regiment (12th Manitoba Dragoons) crossing the Seine River.

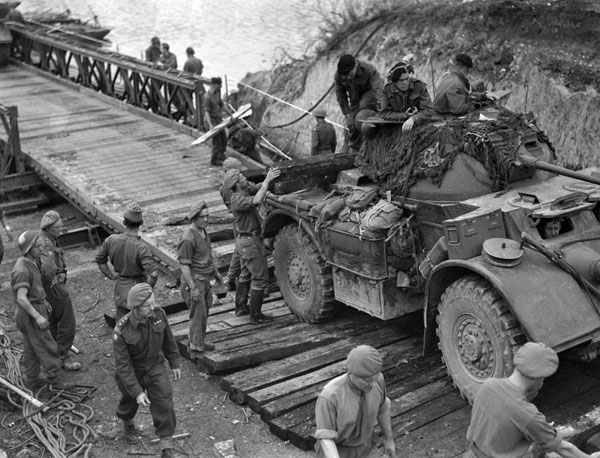
T-17E1 Staghound armoured car of the 12th Manitoba Dragoons crossing a Bailey bridge, Elbeuf, France, 28 August 1944. Soldiers are offloading railway ties to reinforce or smooth out the road surface.

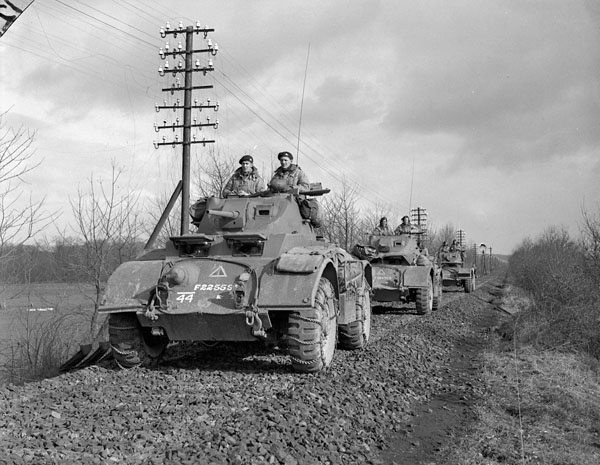
T-17E1 Staghound armoured cars of "A" Squadron, 12th Manitoba Dragoons, in the Hochwald, Germany, 2 March 1945. The first car has tire chains on all four wheels.

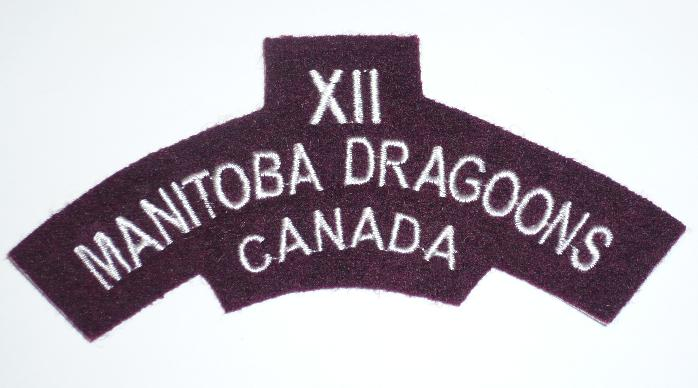
Shoulder Flash

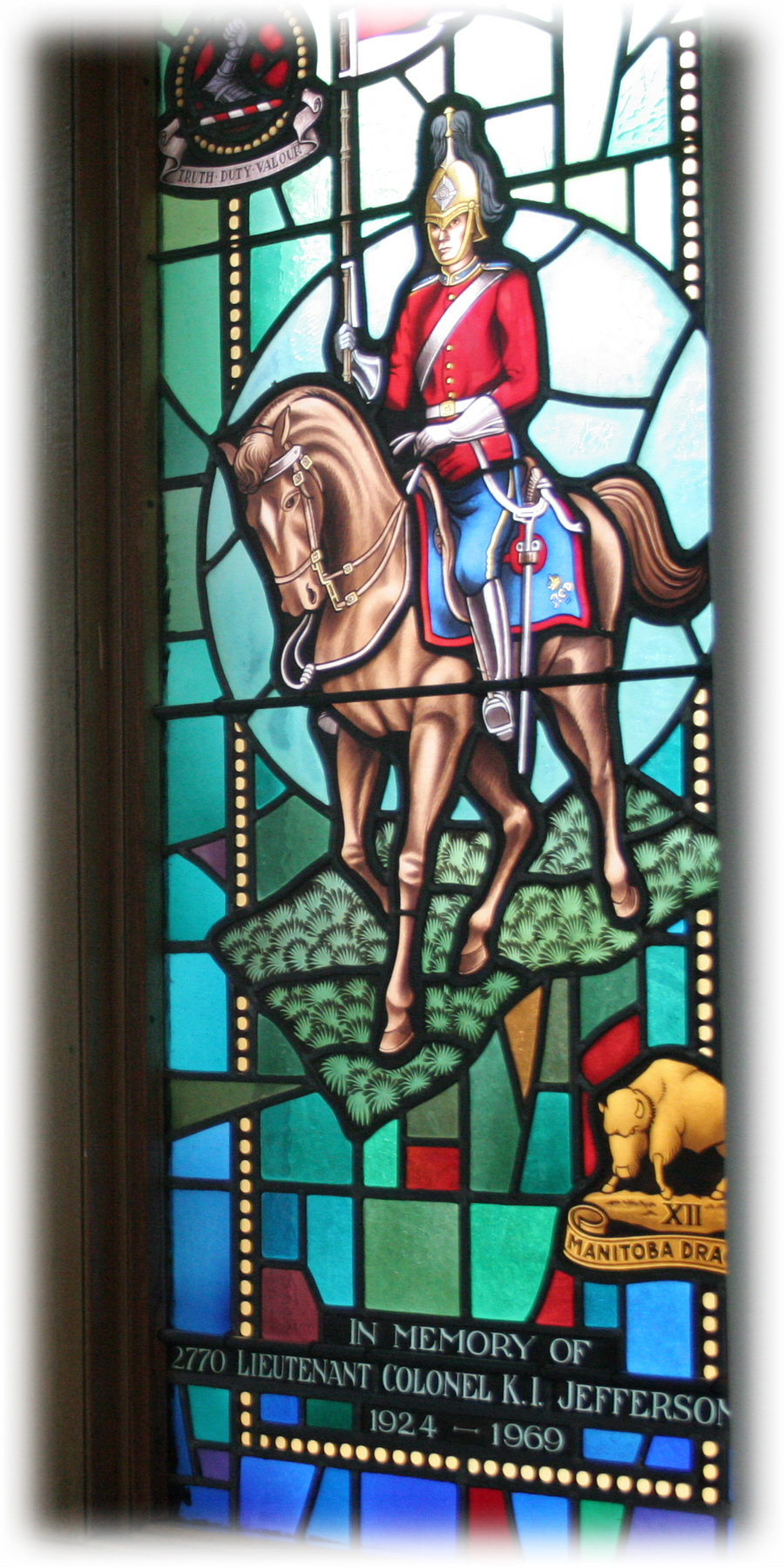
Memorial Stained Glass window, 2770 LCol KL Jefferson is wearing a pre-1914 brass spiked helmet of the 12th Manitoba Dragoons, Royal Military College of Canada.

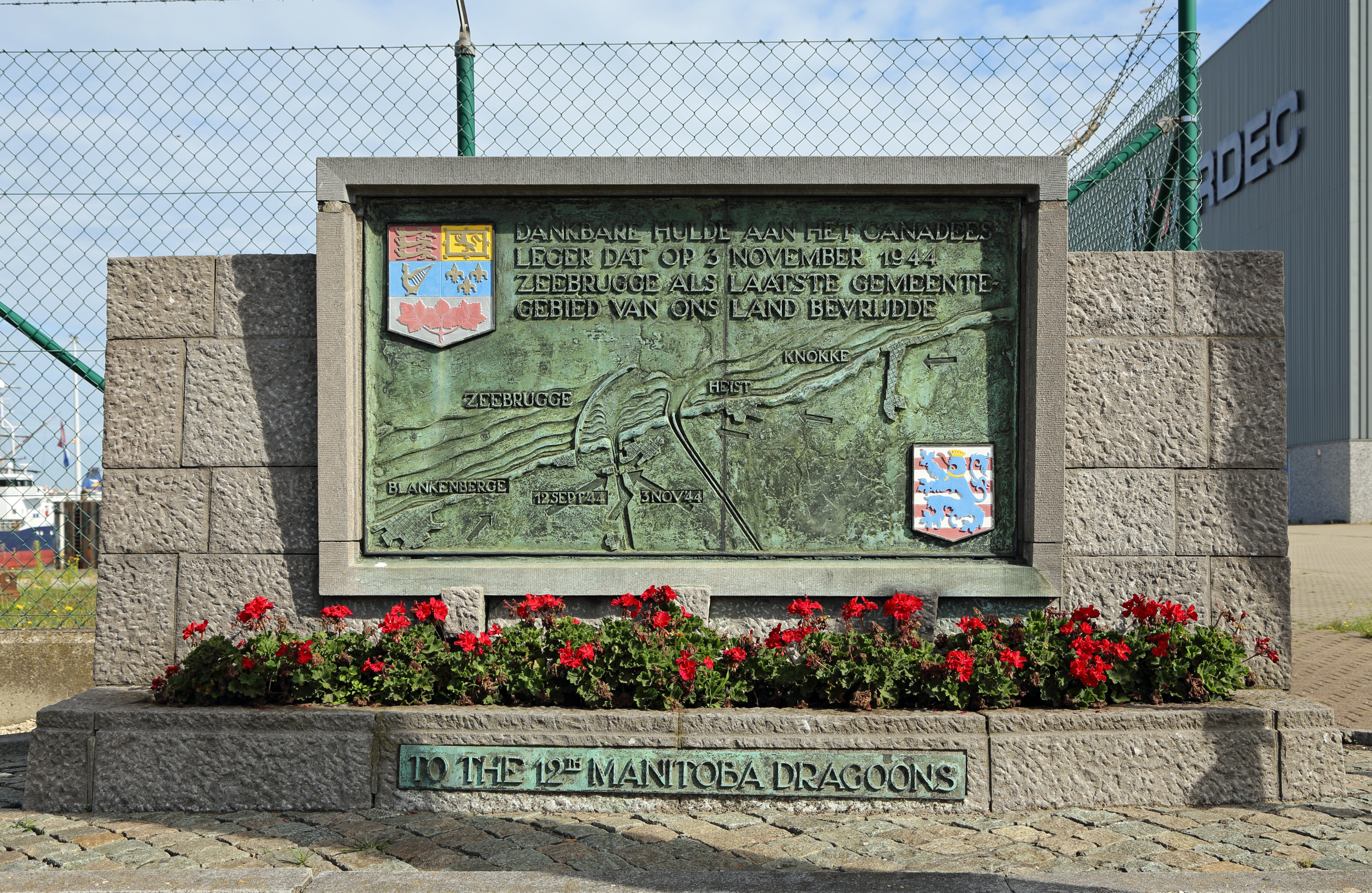
Memorial of the liberation of Zeebrugge (Belgium) on 3 November 1944 by the 12th Manitoba Dragoons.

== Notable people ==
- Colonel Sir Daniel Hunter McMillan KCMG
- Donald MacKeen Smith
- David Berman (mobster)
- Lieutenant-General Robert Moncel OC DSO OBE CD
- Lieutenant-Colonel Gordon Churchill PC DSO
- Lieutenant Frank Crean

== See also ==
- List of regiments of cavalry of the Canadian Militia (1900–1920)

== Media ==
- Regimental History of the 18th Armoured Car Regiment (XII Manitoba Dragoons) by C. E. Henry (1945)
