= Non-Permanent Active Militia =

Former component of the Canadian military (1855–1940)

- Milice active non permanente (French)
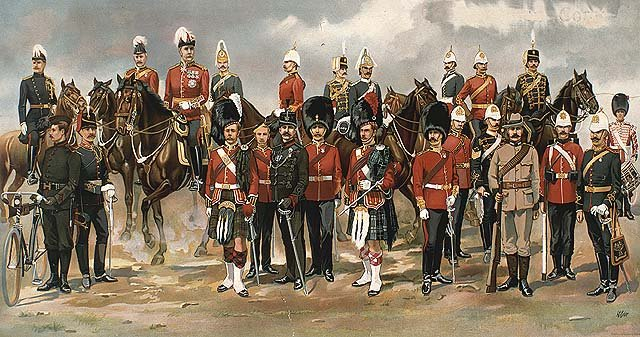
- Uniforms of The Canadian Militia, 1898
- Active: 1855–1940
- Countries: Province of Canada (1855–1867); Canada (1867–1940)
- Type: Army
- Part of: Active Militia
- Engagements: Fenian raids; Wolseley expedition; North-West Rebellion; Second Boer War; World War I; World War II

Commanders
- Commander-in-chief: Monarch represented by: Governor General of the Province of Canada (1855–1867); Governor General of Canada (1867–1940)
- Ministers: Minister of Militia and Defence (1855–1921); Minister of National Defence (1921–1940)
- Military commander: Commander-in-Chief, North America (1855–1875); General Officer Commanding the Canadian Militia (1875–1904); Chief of the General Staff (1904–1940)

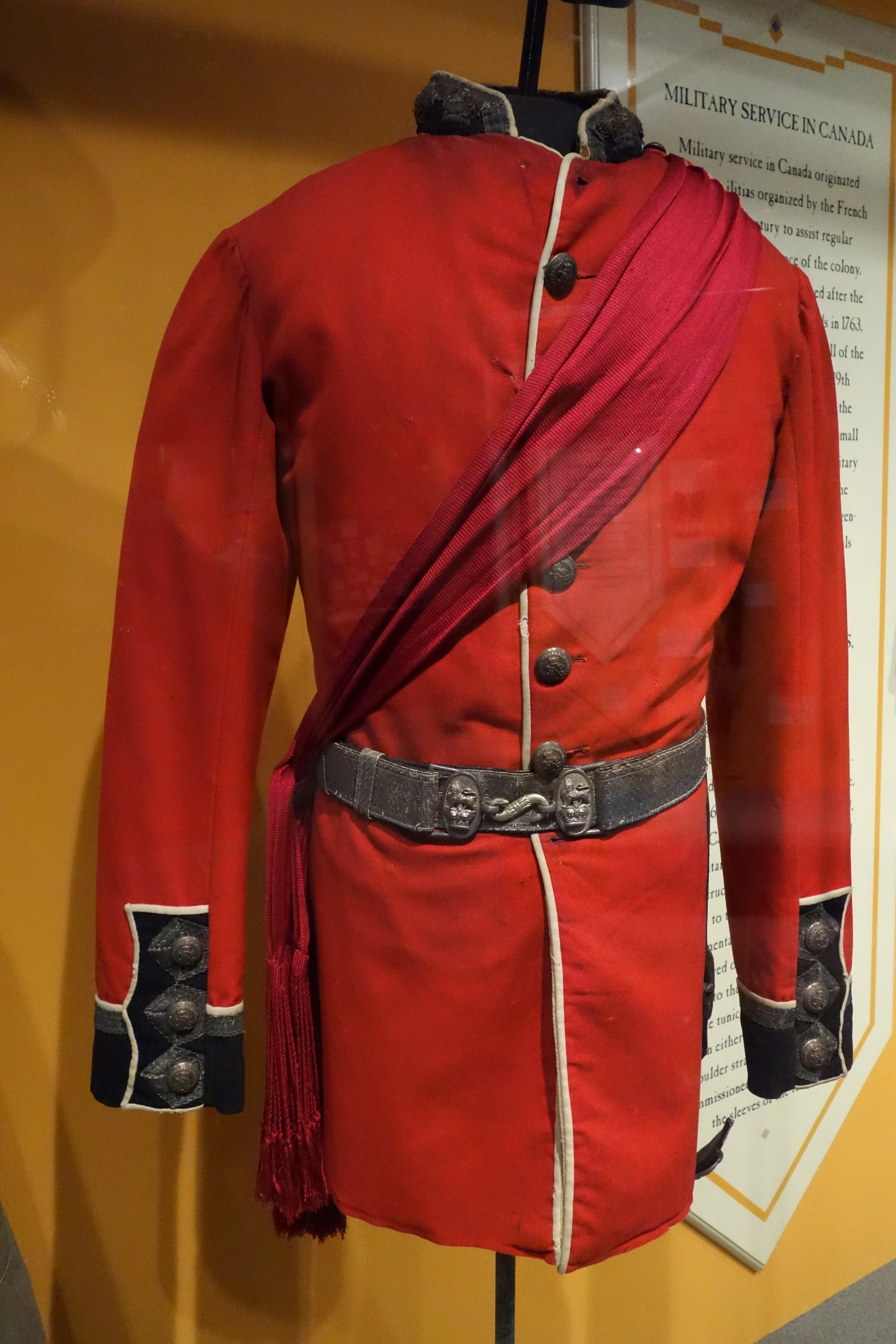
Full dress uniform from the 13th Battalion Volunteer Militia (Infantry), a unit of the Non-Permanent Active Militia.

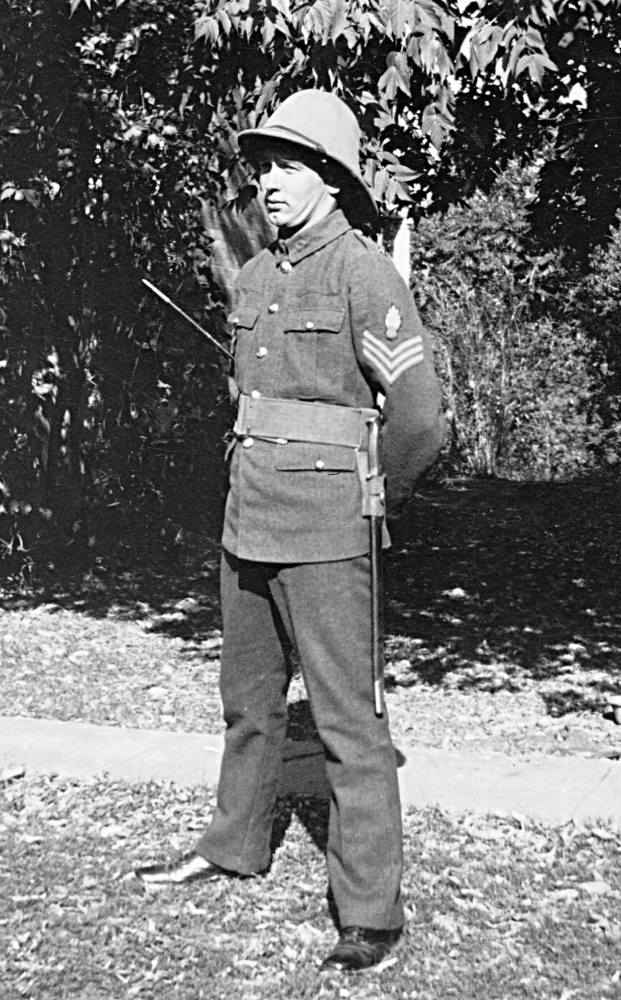
Ernest Guertin in NAPM uniform dated 1932

The Non-Permanent Active Militia (NPAM) was the military reserve force of Canada from 1855 to 1940. It was composed of several dozen infantry battalions (redesignated as regiments in 1900), cavalry regiments and artillery batteries. After the withdrawal of British forces from Canada during the turn of the 20th century, supporting corps were created in Canada as part of both the PAM and the NPAM.

The counterpart to the NPAM was the Permanent Active Militia (PAM), also known as the Permanent Force (PF), which referred to the small full-time professional force ("Regulars") of the Canadian Militia. The NPAM and PAM were distinct forces from the sedentary militias raised in Canada. Both organizations were reorganized into the Canadian Army in 1940.

== History ==
The NPAM was established by the Militia Act of 1855 passed by the Province of Canada. After Confederation in 1867, militia units of Canada, Nova Scotia and New Brunswick were given three months to re-enrol in the militia of the new federation.

At the beginning of the 20th century, NPAM did not provide Canada a standing army ready for immediate action, although it did provide the country the ability to mobilize a force should the need arise. In the decade prior to the start of World War I, the nominal strength of NPAM increased from 36,000 to 55,000 soldiers.

The NPAM did not mobilize during the First World War, though large drafts of NPAM men went into the field force created in 1914 for that conflict, the Canadian Expeditionary Force. Some CEF units adopted regimental traditions from NPAM units. Following the war, the Otter Committee created a unique set of perpetuations, whereby the reorganized NPAM carried on the traditions of both the CEF and the prewar Militia in the Canadian Militia.

On the eve of World War II, NPAM had 5,272 officers, and 41,249 soldiers of all other ranks. In 1940, the NPAM was redesignated the Canadian Army (Reserve); following World War II it was re-designated the Canadian Army Reserve Force, then the Canadian Army (Militia), and finally became the reserve component of Force Mobile Command following Unification on February 1, 1968. However, the historic title "Militia" continued to be applied to the reserve component of Canada's land forces.

== See also ==
- Canadian Militia
- Canadian Army
- Canadian Forces Primary Reserve
- History of the Canadian Army
- List of regiments of cavalry of the Canadian Militia (1900–1920)
