= Otter Commission =

Canadian military commission

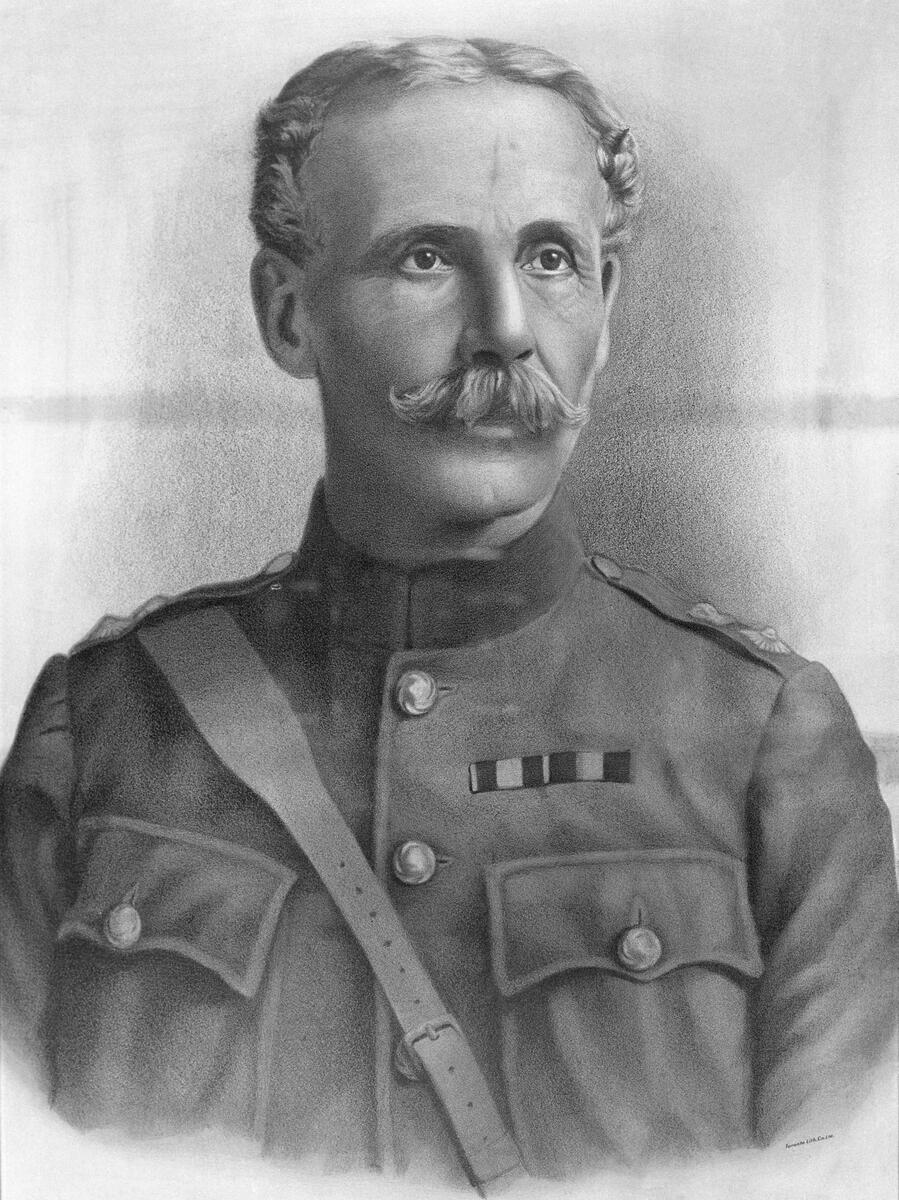
William Dillon Otter

The Otter Commission, or Otter Committee, was established after the First World War to tackle a problem created by the chaotic mobilization of the Canadian Expeditionary Force. In 1919, units of the CEF, intended as a wartime expeditionary force, returned to Canada where the Canadian Militia had served during the war performing home defence duties, staffing internment camps, and raising recruits for overseas. Both the CEF and the Militia desired to be perpetuated in the post-war world. The CEF units were proud of their wartime record, while the pre-war Militia had long-standing roots in the community and battle honours dating back as far as the War of 1812.

== The Commission ==
The commission was headed by General Sir William Dillon Otter. Other members were Major General Archibald Cameron Macdonell, Brigadier General E.A. Cruikshank (who served as Secretary) and Brigadier General A.G.L. McNaughton.

== Hearings ==
The commission held hearings across the country in the autumn of 1919. The catalysts for the commission were peace and fiscal austerity following the end of the First World War. It dealt with questions of national and military unity in the post-war era; ensuring regionalization in the culture of the armed services; determining the future organization and role of the militia; the economization of military expenditure; the integration of various functions; the reinvestment of existing resources into future capabilities; as well as the modernization of military equipment, doctrine, and training.

== Recommendations ==
The Otter Committee did not submit a formal report to the government or release any information to the press. Most of the adopted recommendations, authored primarily by Gwatkin and McNaughton, were enacted over a long period of time. By 1936, the threat of another conflict prompted the re-emergence and adoption of the last few Otter Commission recommendations that had not yet been put in place.

In order to preserve both the pre-war Militia units and the history of the CEF units, a system of perpetuations was created based primarily on geographical connections through the original recruiting areas of the CEF battalions. This provided a basis by which the battle honours of the CEF units were claimed by units of the standing Militia. From a legal standpoint, the existing Militia units had to be disbanded and new ones created. Most of the cavalry and infantry regiments of the Militia had their regimental numbers removed and others were renamed entirely (such as the Eastern Townships Mounted Rifles). Some were disbanded, such as The Dawson Rifles of Canada and the 109th Regiment. Notable exceptions to the abandonment of regimental numbers included the 1st Hussars and the 48th Highlanders of Canada. Individual battalions of the new units were granted perpetuation of CEF units and received claim to their battle honours when they were granted in the 1930s.

In addition to the perpetuation of CEF units by the Non-Permanent Active Militia, the Otter Commission made a major change to the post-war Permanent Force by adding two units that had been raised for service in the CEF in 1914. Permanent additions to the Permanent Active Militia (the Regular Force) were Princess Patricia's Canadian Light Infantry and the 22nd Battalion (today the Royal 22^{e} Régiment). They joined the Permanent Force's infantry arm along with The Royal Canadian Regiment, which in 1914 had been Canada's only full-time infantry unit.

== Legacy ==
Some academics point to the Otter Commission as part of the reason that the Canadian Army was not fully prepared for mobilization at the start of the Second World War. Due to little political support, the suggestion of veterans that Canada have a regular army of 30,000 was rejected by the commission. Instead, it recommended a non-permanent force made up of eleven infantry and four cavalry divisions and a smaller permanent force that incorporated the Royal Canadian Dragoons, Lord Strathcona's Horse, the Royal Canadian Regiment, Princess Patricia's Canadian Light Infantry, and Royal 22^{e} Régiment. However, the number of volunteers for the reserve units fell drastically after 1920 and some non-permanent regiments existed only on paper, as they could not find enough men to fill their ranks. In addition, the Otter Commission called for basic training and ignored the inadequate equipment and lack of mechanization within the Canadian Army after the First World War.

== See also ==
- List of infantry battalions in the Canadian Expeditionary Force
- List of mounted regiments in the Canadian Expeditionary Force
- Canadian Mounted Rifles
- Militia Act of 1855
- Kennedy Report on the Reserve Army
- Supplementary Order of Battle
- Unification of the Canadian Armed Forces
