= Band of the 15th Field Regiment, RCA =

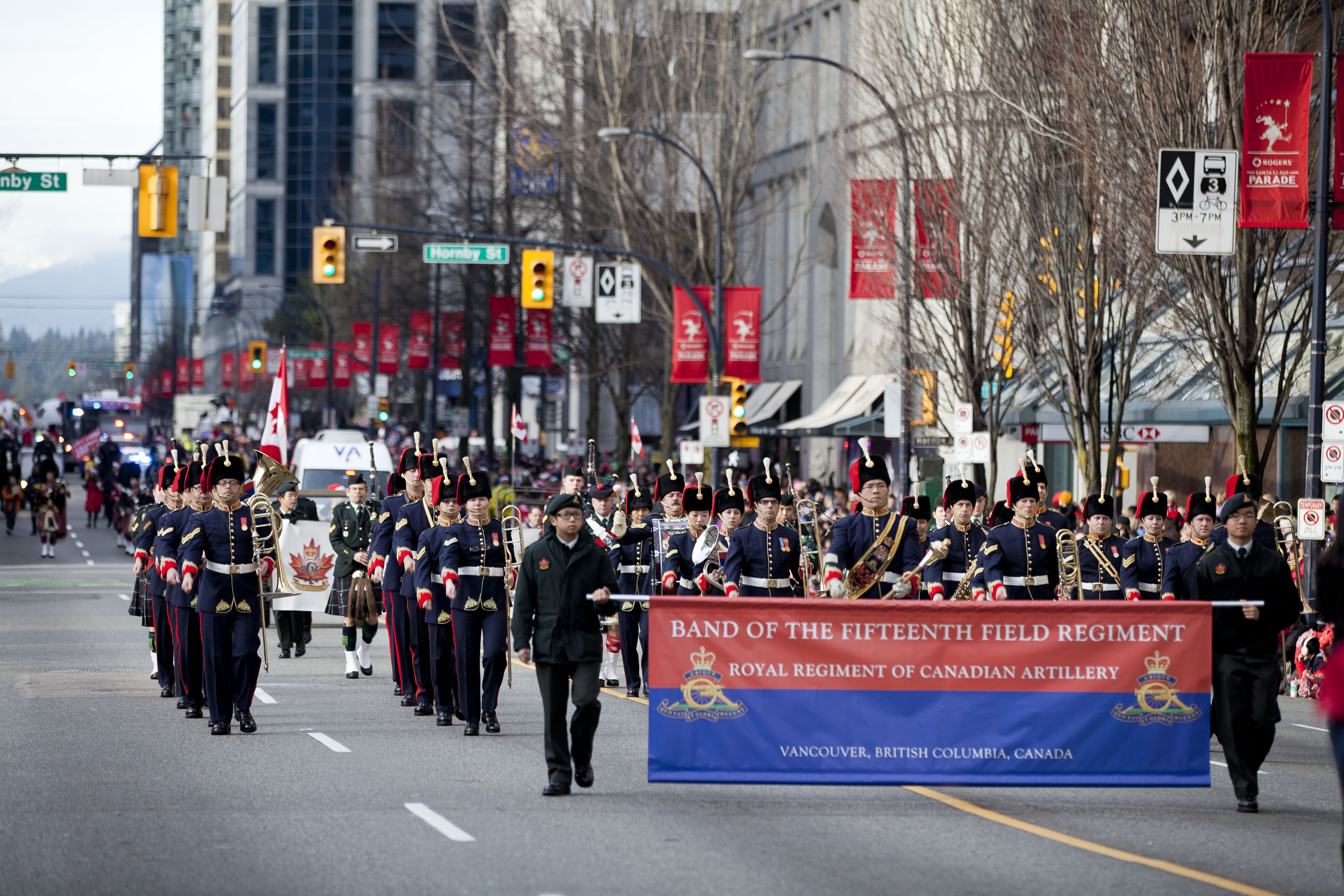
- The band parading in downtown Vancouver during the 2014 Rogers Santa Claus Parade.
- Active: 1934–present
- Country: Canada
- Branch: Canadian Army
- Type: Military band
- Role: Public duties
- Size: 45-piece band
- Part of: 15th Field Artillery Regiment, RCA
- Headquarters: Bessborough Armoury, Vancouver, British Columbia
- Nickname: The Brigade Band
- Mottos: Ubique (Latin for 'everywhere') and quo fas et gloria ducunt (Latin for 'Whither right and glory lead')

Commanders
- Director of Music: Lieutenant Eric Wong, CD
- Notable commanders: Chief Warrant Officer Jimmy Hamilton

The 15th Field Regiment (RCA) Band is one of five Reserve Force bands in the Royal Regiment of Canadian Artillery, located at Bessborough Armoury in Vancouver, British Columbia, Canada. It is a brass and reed band that is part of the RCA's 15th Field Artillery Regiment. All 45 members of the band are reservists while being trained as soldiers and musicians. The band plays for a variety of events including military funerals, ceremonies, parades and mess events. The band maintains a full marching and concert band as well as other musical ensembles that include jazz combos and rock bands.

The band's director of music is the unit's principal conductor and is responsible for the band's creative direction. The band was formed in 1934, 20 years after the regiment's establishment and just after it moved into its current base. Since 1994, the band has been the only reserve band on the mainland British Columbia. In 2000, the band outgrew its facilities in the Bessborough Armoury and relocated to the Garrison Headquarters building near Jericho Beach on English Bay. The band then moved to the newly built Hoffmeister Building near the Burrard Street Bridge in 2019. Although still under the command and control of the home regiment, the band functions largely independently as a self-contained subunit and performs more than one hundred engagements annually.

== Directors of music ==
The following is a list of directors of music since 1933:

- Will Edmunds (1934–1937)
- Chief Warrant Officer Al Sweet (1953–1969)
- Major Peter Erwin (1969–1984)
- Captain Richard Van Slyke (1984–2004)
- Captain James Tempest (2004–2017)
- Captain Cheryl McHugh (2017–2022)
- Warrant Officer Nathaniel Senff (2022–2023)
- Lieutenant Eric Wong (2023–present)

== Role ==
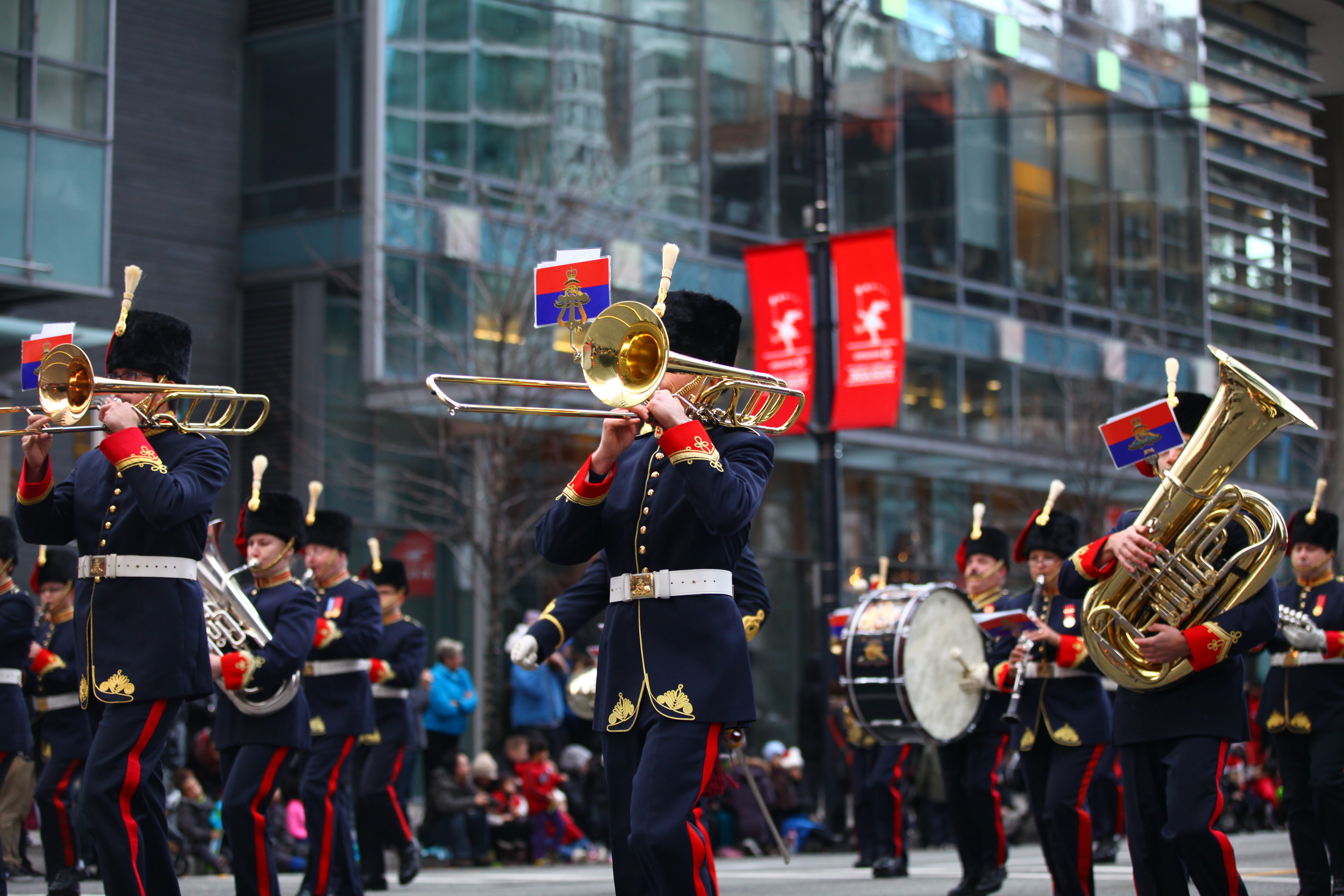
Band in the full dress uniform of the RCA.

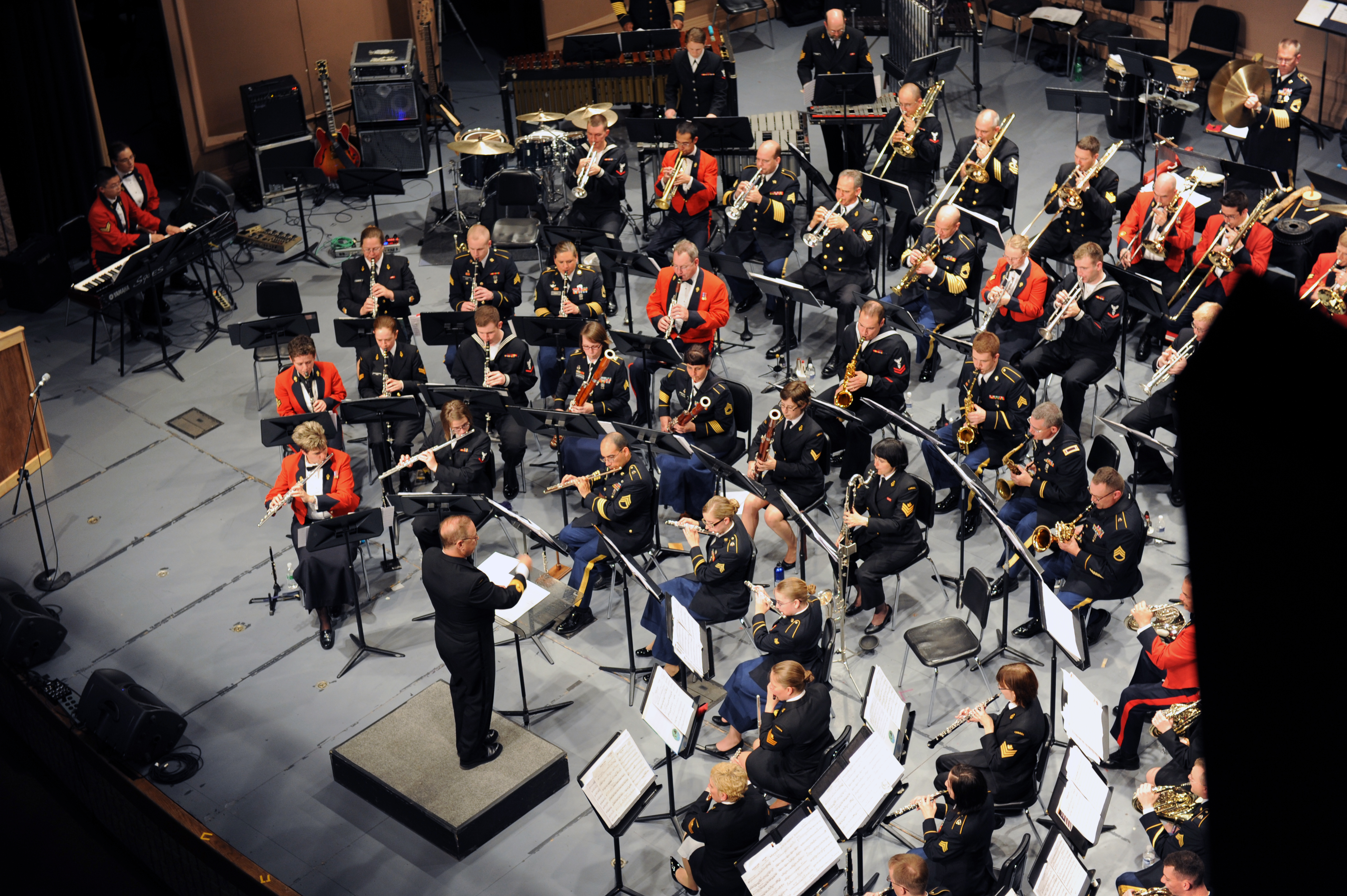
The band with other military bands from the United States and Canada at the International Military Band Concert.

The band is a part of 39 Canadian Brigade Group, and supports all types of activities in the brigade. Since 1994, its duties have expanded greatly to support all reserve units in the province. It participates in all Vancouver area civilian and military parades, representing the regiment and the RCA. It also parades in Kelowna or Kamloops and even as far east as the Kootenays. The band has become a vital tool in public relations for the army. Outside the country, the band has performed in community celebrations in Quebec City, California, the Netherlands and Hong Kong. In 2003 and 2012, the band took part in the Fortissimo Sunset Ceremony on Parliament Hill at the invitation of the Ottawa-based Ceremonial Guard.

=== International Military Concert ===
The band has participated in the International Military Concert in the US state of Washington since the 1990s. It involves the participation of the band, accompanied from Canada by the Naden Band of Maritime Forces Pacific, as well as bands from the United States Armed Forces, which have included in years past: the I Corps Band, the 133rd Army National Guard Band, United States Navy Band Northwest, and United States Air Force Band of the Golden West. Featured music often played at the concert include the two national anthems ("O Canada" and "The Star-Spangled Banner") unit marches ("Anchors Aweigh", "Royal Artillery Slow March", and "Heart of Oak"). Contemporary marches are also performed at the concert.

=== Performing sections ===
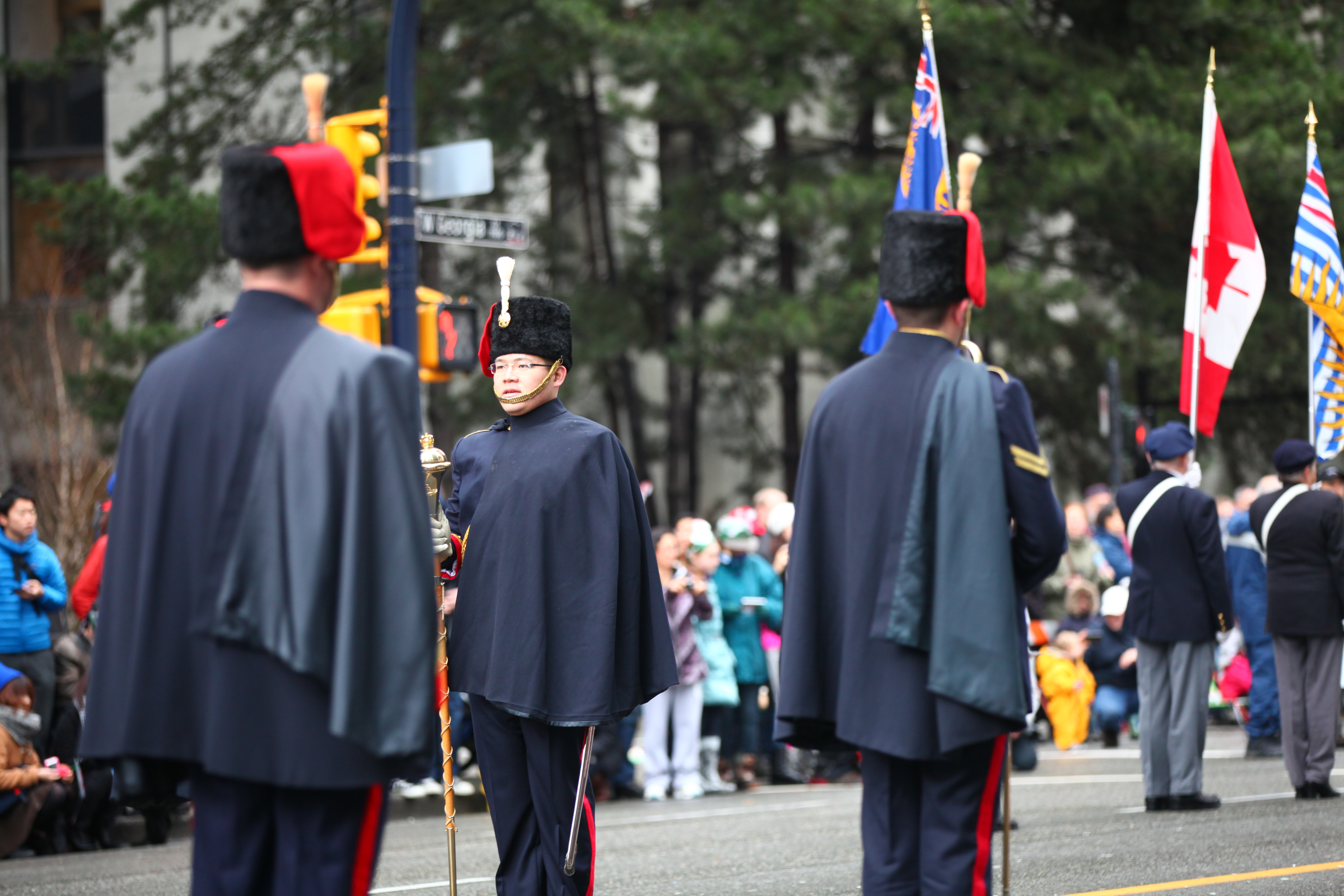
Drum Major Eric Wong standing at attention during a parade in 2012.

The principal components of the band are divided into the following sections:

- Brass
- Woodwind
- Percussion

The RCA Band is a 45-piece band that also performs in the following configurations:

- Parade Band
- Concert Band
- Quay Winds
- Bessborough Brass (established in 1990)
- Locarno Saxophones
- Jericho Tuba Ensemble
- The Gunners Big Band
- Scarlet and Blues Clarinet Quintet

== See also ==
- Canadian military bands
- Music Branch (Canadian Forces)
- Royal Canadian Artillery Band
