= 15th Field Artillery Regiment =

15th Field Artillery Regiment can refer to:

- 15th Field Artillery Regiment (Canada)
- 15th Field Artillery Regiment (United States)
