= Band of the Duke of Edinburgh's Royal Regiment =

The Duke of Edinburgh's Royal Regiment Band was a military band of the British Army that served as the regimental band of the Duke of Edinburgh's Royal Regiment (Berkshire and Wiltshire) from 1959 to 1994. During its existence, the regimental band maintained a corps of drums alongside its band that took part in many different ceremonies on behalf of the regiment.

The drum major was responsible for the day to day running and deployment of the Corps of Drums. When on parade, the drum major uses a ceremonial mace used that includes silver chain is entwined about the staff.

== Timeline ==
=== Early years ===
The band was founded in 1959 from an amalgamation of the Royal Berkshire Regiment Band and Drums and the Wiltshire Regiment Band. Up until the late 1960s, it did not have a ceremonial full dress uniform.

=== 1979 Bombings ===
In August 1979, members of the regimental band were hurt in the 1979 Brussels bombing on the Grand-Place, carried out by volunteers belonging to the Provisional Irish Republican Army (IRA). The bombing injured seven bandsmen and eleven civilians. Fatalities were avoided as only some of the band's 30 members arrived (the rest were stuck in city traffic) and the band members that were there were dressing away from the stage.

=== 1980s and final years ===
Between 1981 and 1985, the band saw a decrease in its number of musicians, dropping to 22 from 28. In October 1984, the regiment was given the duty of guard mounting at Buckingham Palace, as well as the Tower of London and St. James's Palace. The band under Major Lake, supported by a company of 150 soldiers, performed during the execution of public duties in the capital. In June 1986, it took part in a Beating Retreat with the Pipes & Drums of the Ulster Defence Regiment. While the band was in Asia, it performed at ceremonies in neighbouring countries and territories of the Crown, including Hong Kong and Japan. While the band was deployed to Joint Base Lewis–McChord in the United States in the spring of 1992, it carried out a series of engagements in the region that culminated in a joint concert with the I Corps Band at the Washington State Capitol in Olympia. In addition, the Corps of Drums participated in the Beating Retreat at an Anglo-American Band Concert.

== See also ==
- Coldstream Guards Band
- Band of the Brigade of Gurkhas
- Band of the Royal Regiment of Scotland
