= 1979 Brussels bombing =

Provisional IRA bombing in Belgium

- Part of the Troubles
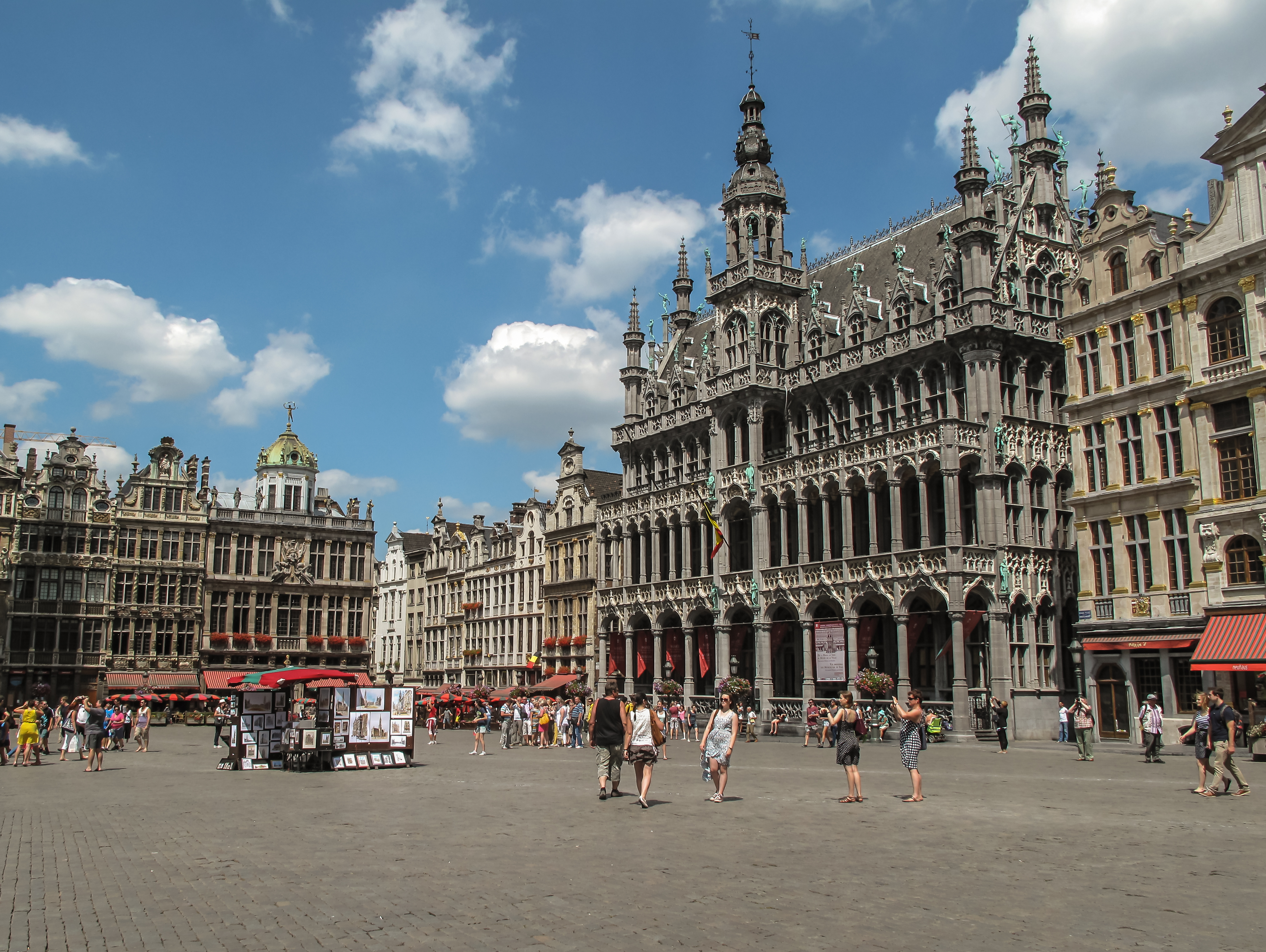
- The Grand-Place/Grote Markt
- Location: 50°50′48″N 4°21′9″E; Brussels, Belgium
- Date: 28 August 1979; 15:00 (UTC)
- Attack type: Bomb
- Deaths: 0
- Injuries: 18
- Perpetrator: Provisional Irish Republican Army (IRA)

The 1979 Brussels bombing was an attack carried out by volunteers belonging to the Provisional Irish Republican Army (IRA) against a British Army band on the Grand-Place/Grote Markt, the central square of Brussels, Belgium, on 28 August 1979. The bombing injured seven bandsmen and eleven civilians, and caused extensive damage.

== Background ==
The bombing was part of the IRA's European continental campaign against British targets in its fight to force the British out of Northern Ireland, in a protracted armed conflict known as the Troubles. The attack in Brussels was one of numerous ones from the IRA on the continent at the time. Earlier that year, Richard Sykes, British ambassador to the Netherlands was assassinated in Amsterdam. A Brussels explosion on 25 June, narrowly missing American Alexander Haig, was intended for a British general. A bomb attack in Antwerp targeted the British consulate building on 6 July 1979.

In the two days before the 29 August bombing, 18 British soldiers had been killed in Northern Ireland in the Warrenpoint ambush, and Lord Mountbatten had been assassinated in the Republic of Ireland, both by the IRA.

== Bombing and aftermath ==
The band, from the Duke of Edinburgh's Royal Regiment based in Osnabrück, West Germany, was about to perform a concert as the bomb was planted underneath the open-air stage. Only some of the band's 30 members had already arrived, as the others were lucky enough to have been stuck in city traffic. Also, injuries were lessened and fatalities avoided since the band's members were dressing, away from the stage, at the time of the explosion.

The bombing happened while the city was celebrating its thousandth anniversary.

The IRA claimed responsibility in a telephone call to the city hall, according to Mayor Pierre Van Halteren. According to West German intelligence, the IRA possibly planned the attack in co-ordination with the Palestine Liberation Organization (PLO).

== See also ==
- Warrenpoint ambush
- 1987 Rheindahlen bombing
- 1988 IRA attacks in the Netherlands
- Provisional Irish Republican Army campaign 1969–1997
