= 15th Field Artillery Regiment, RCA =

Coordinates: 49.2621°N 123.1515°W

- 15^{e} Régiment d'artillerie de campagne, ARC (French)
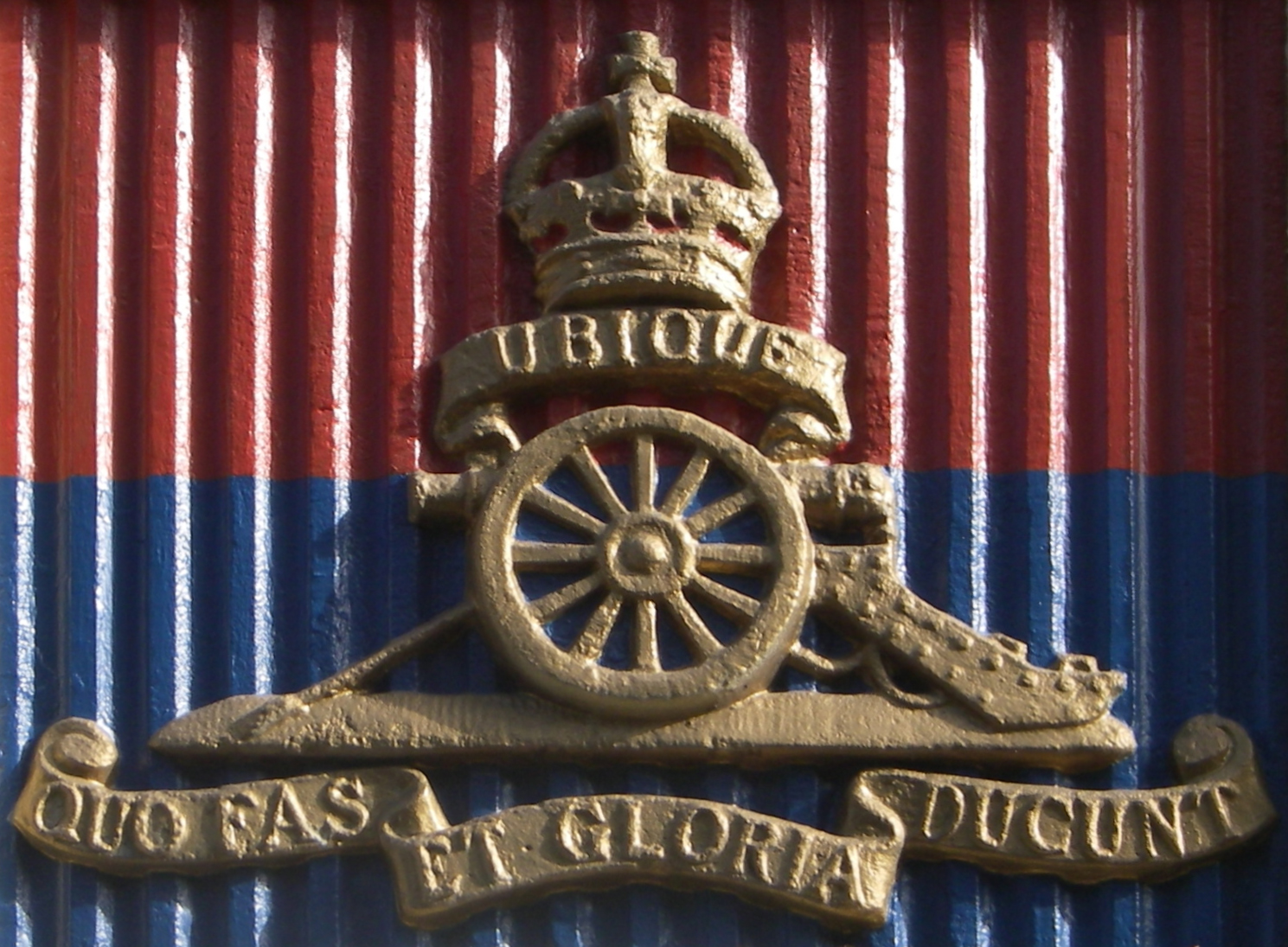
- Badge of the Royal Canadian Artillery
- Active: 1920–present
- Country: Canada
- Branch: Canadian Army
- Type: Field artillery
- Part of: 39 Canadian Brigade Group
- Garrison/HQ: Bessborough Armoury, Vancouver, British Columbia
- Mottos: Ubique (Latin for 'everywhere') and quo fas et gloria ducunt (Latin for 'whither right and glory lead')
- March: Slow march: "Royal Artillery Slow March"; Quick march: "British Grenadiers"; Trot past: "Keel Row"
- Abbreviation: 15 Fd Regt

15th Field Artillery Regiment, RCA, is a Primary Reserve Royal Canadian Artillery (RCA) regiment based in Vancouver, British Columbia, at the Bessborough Armoury. 15th Field Regiment is part of the 39 Canadian Brigade Group of 3rd Canadian Division.

The regiment was created in 1920 as one of the recommendations of the Otter Committee. In the Second World War it manned the coastal defence artillery guns that protected the Port of Vancouver. After the war, the regiment reverted to field artillery. While the regiment has never deployed forces overseas, several of its members have individually participated in Canadian Forces missions overseas.

== History ==
=== Foundations ===
The end of World War I saw thousands of Canadians returning home from overseas service with the Canadian Expeditionary Force in Europe. In January 1918 Major-General William Otter recommended to the Government of Canada that a perfect situation existed in which to reorganize the active militia. This suggestion lead to the creation of the Committee of Militia Reorganization in 1919. As Major-General Otter was the president of this committee it was commonly known as the Otter Committee.

On 16 December 1919, at the request of the Otter Committee, a group of 11 artillery officers, recently returned from Europe, met to discuss the creation of a militia artillery regiment in Vancouver. The results of this meeting were worked into the recommendations of the Otter Committee and on 2 February 1920 the Government of Canada authorized the creation of the 15th Brigade, Canadian Field Artillery.

The 15th Brigade was composed of the 31st, 68th, and 85th Batteries of field artillery as well as the Headquarters and an Ammunition Column. The 5th Siege Battery was attached to them for administration purposes. Lieutenant F.T. Coghlan, DSO, a veteran of World War I, was the first commanding officer of the brigade.

At their formation the field artillery batteries were equipped with the Ordnance QF 18 pounder while the 5th Siege Battery was equipped with BL 60 pounder guns.

The first home of the brigade was the Vancouver Horse Show Building on Georgia Street at Alberni Street near Stanley Park. The building was inadequate for the needs of an artillery unit with the exception that it had good facilities for the horses that drew the guns. In March 1934 the 15th Brigade received a new home, the Bessborough Armoury, a modern facility that they shared with the British Columbia Hussars. The next year the militia artillery across Canada was reorganized and the brigade's name was changed to 15th Field Brigade, Royal Canadian Artillery.

When the brigade was created they were supplied with guns by the Canadian Army but not with horses to move them. For their first exercises the gunners had to borrow horses to pull their guns. In June 1928 in order to save money and increase their range, the 5th Battery of the 15th Brigade became one of the first Canadian militia artillery units to experiment with towing guns using trucks. The exercise of 9 June, commanded by Major J.G. Chutter, had the four 60-pounders of the 5th Battery towed by four International trucks. Major Chutter's report at the end of the exercise showed that use of trucks was much less expensive than using horses and that they were able to accomplish three times the training.

Throughout the 1920s and 1930s, the brigade's training during the year leads towards a summer training camp. The camps were held in different locations, such as Hastings Park in Vancouver and Sarcee Camp in Alberta.

=== Second World War ===
In the mid-1930s the Government of Canada began to take a serious look at the defence of the west coast of Canada. The Empire of Japan had a growing influence over the Pacific and the idea of a war between Canada's allies, the United Kingdom and the United States, with Japan seemed a likely scenario. In 1936 Major B.C.D. Treatt of the Coast Artillery School in England was asked to make recommendations for the defence of the west coast of British Columbia from an attack by sea. In his report Major Treatt made many recommendations including the creation of four new coastal artillery forts to guard the Port of Vancouver. The forts were located in such a way as to stop any ship or submarine from passing into Burrard Inlet. There was also a fort in the Strait of Georgia to prevent ships from approaching Vancouver from the north. After the war began another fort was built to assist in the inspection of ships entering the Fraser River at Steveston.

In 1937 Parliament approved the construction of the forts but had not decided who would man the guns in the event of war. In World War I members of the Naval Reserve and reservists from Cobourg, Ontario, had manned the coastal defence batteries in Vancouver. In spring 1938 it was decided that members of the Canadian Militia would man them and the 15th Brigade was assigned as coast defence artillery, becoming the 15th Coast Brigade, RCA. A year later in May 1939 the 68th Battery and the 5th Battery were detached to become the 1st Anti-Aircraft Regiment, RCA, to protect Vancouver from attacks from the air. Both the coast defence and anti-aircraft guns were supported by the 1st Searchlight Regiment, RCA, formerly the British Columbia Hussars. They were tasked with operating the ten 800-million-candlepower searchlights, for the coast artillery batteries to target ships at night, as well as manning searchlights for the anti-aircraft guns.

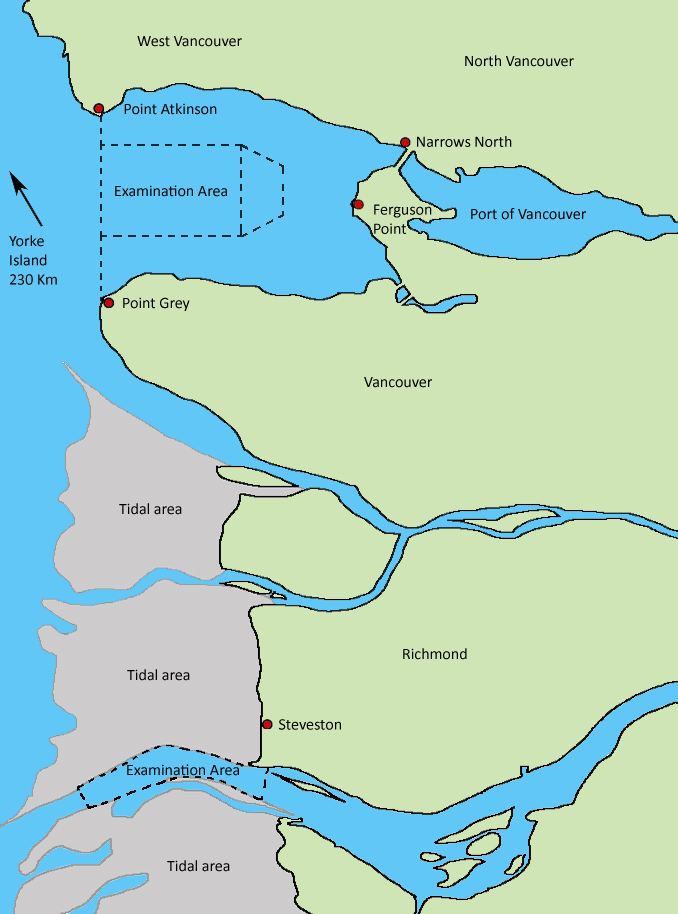
Map showing the location of the coastal defence forts manned by the 15th Coast Regiment, RCA

The 15th Coast Brigade was mobilized on 25 August 1939 before war was declared on Nazi Germany. None of the forts were complete when the soldiers arrived for duty so they had to help finish the construction. The batteries of the 15th Coast Brigade were sent to the following forts:

- Ferguson Point 31st Battery
- Narrows North 31st Battery
- Point Atkinson 31st Battery
- Point Grey 58th Battery
- Steveston 58th Battery
- York Island 85th Heavy Battery

Apart from their primary role of repelling attacking enemy submarines and ships, most of the forts were also responsible for assisting with the examination of ships approaching Vancouver. Examination areas were set up where ships requesting entrance to the harbour had to stop and submit to an inspection by the Royal Canadian Navy. If a ship failed to stop for inspection the Navy would signal the artillery batteries to fire a round in front of the offending vessel and if necessary sink it. If a stopping round was fired at a ship, the ship's owner was required to pay for the round at a cost of $42.50.

In the summer of 1942, the Japanese attacked the Aleutian Islands and various locations along the west coast of the United States. On 20 June the only attack of the war on Canadian soil took place at Estevan Point. This combined with the loss of thousands of Canadians at the Battle of Hong Kong seemed to justify the creation of the Pacific coastal forts in the minds of Canadians.

After the Battle of Midway the Japanese Navy lost much of its offensive power and was no longer considered a significant threat to the west coast of Canada. This combined with the need for manpower in Europe, after the invasions of Sicily and Normandy, lead to the decision to shut down Vancouver's coast defence forts. On 1 September 1944 all the forts, with the exception of the York Island fort, were reduced to maintenance manning and the gunners of the 15th Coast Artillery were reassigned to other duties. A team of 20 draftees conscripted under the National Resources Mobilization Act were left to maintain the forts. By October 1945, two months after the Japanese surrender, all but one of the forts were deactivated.

=== 1945 to present ===
After the war the regiment returned to reserve service and remained coastal artillery, training with the guns at the Point Grey Fort. In 1948 they reverted to field artillery with the new name of 15th Field Regiment, RCA. A new regiment, the 102nd Coast Regiment, was formed and trained on the coastal guns on Vancouver Island until they were absorbed into the 43rd Medium Anti-Aircraft Regiment in 1954. The 43rd Medium Anti-Aircraft Regiment was created in 1946 from the 1st Anti-Aircraft Regiment and was absorbed back into the 15th Field Regiment, RCA, in 1959.

While the regiment has not deployed overseas, individual members have deployed on operations in Germany, Egypt, Cyprus, the Former Republic of Yugoslavia (Croatia, Bosnia and Serbia), Haiti, Sudan, and Afghanistan. Members also participated in Operation Podium, the Canadian Forces mission to assist with security for the 2010 Winter Olympics in Vancouver, British Columbia.

The regiment currently has three sub-units:

1. 68th Field Battery, which is the current firing battery and retains the history of 68th Battery, Canadian Field Artillery, which fought in Northern Russia at the close of World War I;
2. 31st Field Battery, which is the current headquarters and services battery; and
3. The band (mentioned in a preceding section).

=== Lineage chart ===
Lineage chart

1916	No. 165th (Canadian) Siege Bty, CEF (Note: 2nd Brigade, CGA, CEF)
1917	No. 5 Canadian Siege Bty, CEF
1919	Demobilized
1920	15th Bde, CFA
1925	15th Fd Bde, CA
1935	15th Fd Bde, RCA
1938	15th Coast Bde, RCA
1938	15th (Vancouver) Coast Bde, RCA
1939	1st Anti-Aircraft Regt, RCA
1940	15th (Reserve) (Vancouver) Coast Bde, RCA	1st (Reserve) Anti-Aircraft Regt, RCA
1941	15th (Vancouver) Coast Bde, RCA, CASF
1942	15th (Vancouver) Coast Regt, RCA, CASF
1944	Disbanded
1946	15th Coast Regt, RCA	43rd Heavy Anti-Aircraft Regt, RCA
1948	15th Fd Regt, RCA	Vancouver Coast Regt, RCA
1949	102nd Coast Regt, RCA
1954	43rd Heavy Anti-Aircraft Regt, RCA
1955	43rd Medium Anti-Aircraft Regt, RCA
1959	15th Fd Regt, RCA
1960	15th Fd Arty Regt, RCA

== 15th Field Regiment, Royal Canadian Artillery Museum and Archives ==
15th Field Regiment, Royal Canadian Artillery Museum and Archives
- Established: 1983
- Location: Bessborough Armoury, 2025 West 11th Avenue, Vancouver, British Columbia, Canada
- Type: Regimental Museum and Archives
- Curator: Peter Moogk CD

The museum collects, preserves, interprets and exhibits artifacts related to the 15th Field Artillery Regiment, RCA, its predecessors and other artillery units which have been located in the Vancouver area. The museum is affiliated with: Canadian Museums Association, Canadian Heritage Information Network, Organization of Military Museums of Canada and Virtual Museum of Canada.

== 15th Field Regiment (RCA) Band ==
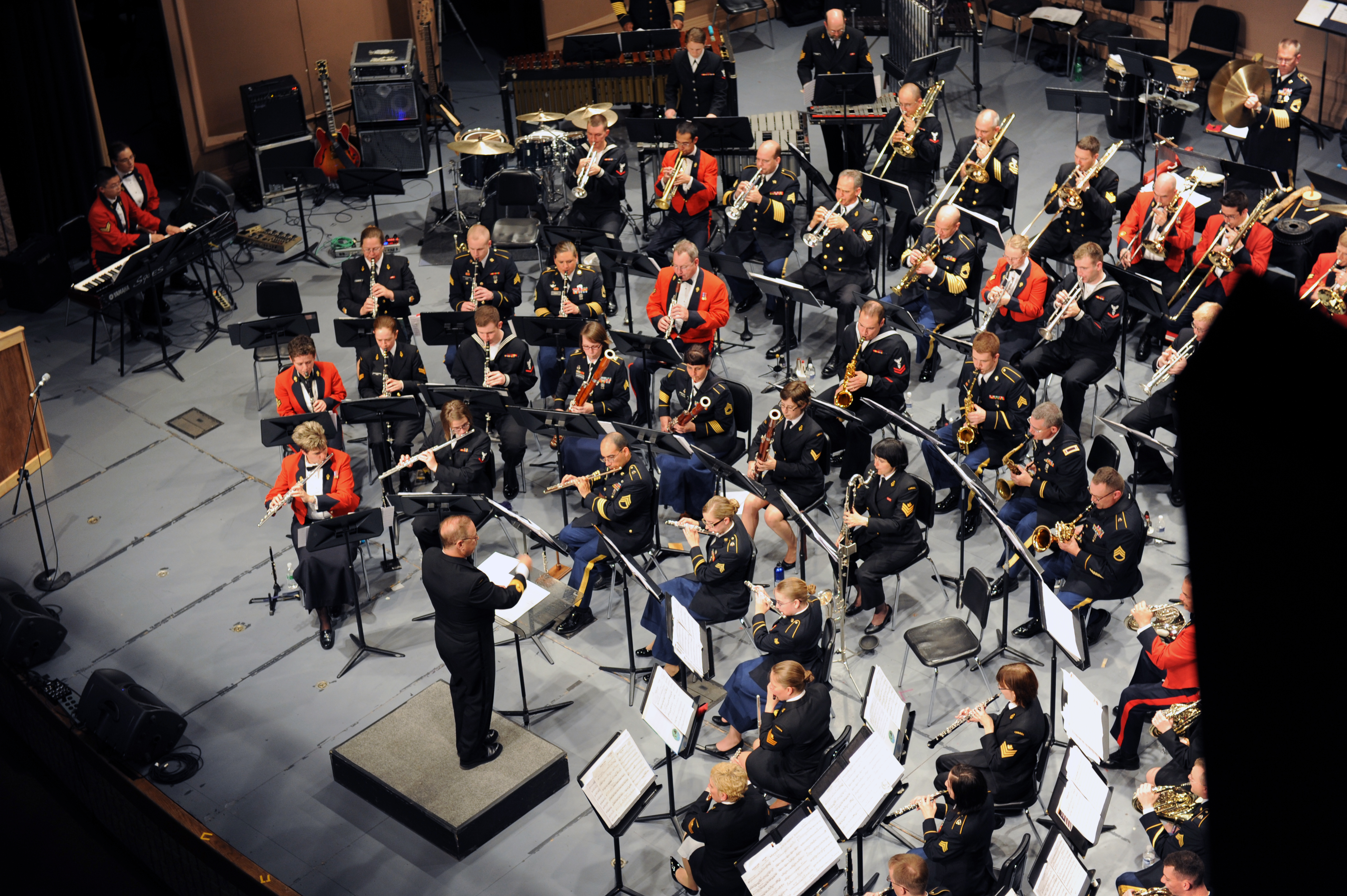
Band of 15th Field Regiment, Royal Canadian Artillery accompanied U.S. Navy Band Northwest at International Military Band Concert

The 15th Field Regiment (RCA) Band is a military brass and reed band that is part of the 15th Field Regiment R.C.A. The band has 45 members who are all reservists and are trained as soldiers as well as musicians. The band plays for a variety of events including military funerals, ceremonies, parades and Mess events.

== Cadet unit ==
15th Field Regiment, RCA has one affiliated corps of the Royal Canadian Army Cadets, 2472 RCACC. 2472 receives support from the regiment for its activities and its members are permitted to wear the traditional regimental accoutrements of the 15th Field Regiment on their cadet uniforms.

== Precedence ==
Preceded by 11th Field Artillery Regiment, RCA	15th Field Artillery Regiment (Canada)	Succeeded by 20th Field Artillery Regiment, RCA of Royal Canadian Artillery Regiments
