= British Columbia Hussars =

The British Columbia Hussars
- Active: 1908–1939
- Country: Canada
- Branch: Canadian Militia
- Type: Hussars
- Role: Cavalry, armoured car
- Size: One regiment
- Part of: Non-Permanent Active Militia
- Garrison/HQ: Vancouver, British Columbia
- Mottos: Latin: arma pacis fulcra, lit. 'weapons of peace'
- Engagements: First World War
- Battle honours: Ypres, 1915; Festubert, 1915

The British Columbia Hussars was a light cavalry regiment of the Non-Permanent Active Militia of the Canadian Militia (now the Canadian Army). In 1939, the regiment was converted from light armour to artillery.

== Lineage ==
- Originated on 1 April 1908, as the British Columbia Horse.
- Reorganised on 1 December 1911, into two separate regiments: the 1st Regiment, British Columbia Horse (now The British Columbia Dragoons) and the 2nd Regiment, British Columbia Horse.
- Redesignated on 15 April 1912, as the 31st Regiment, British Columbia Horse.
- Redesignated on 1 November 1920, as the 5th British Columbia Light Horse.
- Redesignated on 15 August 1932, as the British Columbia Hussars.
- Amalgamated on 15 December 1936, with the Headquarters and B Company of the 11th Machine Gun Battalion, CMGC, and redesignated as the British Columbia Hussars (Armoured Car).
- Converted on 15 May 1939, from light armour to artillery and redesignated as the 1st Searchlight Regiment, RCA.

== History ==
On 1 April 1908, the British Columbia Horse was authorized to be formed. It had independent squadrons based at Kamloops, Vernon and Lower Nicola.

On 1 April 1911, four more squadrons were authorized to be raised for the BC Horse in order to create two regiments of four squadrons each. Later that same year on 1 December 1911, these two regiments were formed and designated as the 1st Regiment, British Columbia Horse (now The British Columbia Dragoons) and the 2nd Regiment, British Columbia Horse. The Regimental Headquarters of the 2nd BC Horse were first established at Meritt and had squadrons based at Kamloops, Salmon Arm, Wallachin and Merritt.

On 15 April 1912, the 2nd BC Horse was redesignated as the 31st Regiment, British Columbia Horse.

On 1 November 1920, as a result of the Canadian Militia reorganization following the Otter Commission, the 31st Regiment British Columbia Horse was redesignated as the 5th British Columbia Light Horse.

On 15 August 1932, they were again redesignated as the British Columbia Hussars. A few years later in March 1934, they relocated to Vancouver and were based at the Bessborough Armoury which they shared with the 15th Brigade, Canadian Field Artillery.

On 15 December 1936, as part of the 1936 Canadian Militia reorganization, the British Columbia Hussars were amalgamated with the Headquarters and “B” Company of the 11th Machine Gun Battalion and Redesignated as the British Columbia Hussars (Armoured Car), becoming one of three designated armoured car regiments in the pre-war Canadian Militia.

On 15 May 1939, the British Columbia Hussars were converted to artillery and redesignated as the 1st Searchlight Regiment, Royal Canadian Artillery. As part of the coastal artillery defences of Vancouver the searchlight regiment worked closely with the 15th (Vancouver) Coast Regiment, RCA and other units.

== Organization ==
=== 2nd Regiment, British Columbia Horse (1 December 1911) ===
- A Squadron (Lumby)
- B Squadron (Kelowna)
- C Squadron (Salmon Arm)
- D Squadron (Wallachin)

=== 2nd Regiment, British Columbia Horse (1 March 1912) ===
- Regimental Headquarters (Merritt – moved 1915 to Kamloops)
- A Squadron (Kamloops)
- B Squadron (Salmon Arm – moved 1916 to Vancouver)
- C Squadron (Wallachin – moved 1915 to Langley Prairie)
- D Squadron (Merritt – formerly at Lower Nicola)

=== 5th British Columbia Light Horse (1921) ===
- Regimental Headquarters (Kamloops)
- A Squadron (Kamloops)
- B Squadron (Merritt – moved 1924 to Vancouver)
- C Squadron (Langley Prairie – moved 1924 to Merritt)

=== The British Columbia Hussars (Armoured Car) (12 December 1936) ===
- Regimental Headquarters (Vancouver)
- A Squadron (Kamloops)
- B Squadron (Vancouver)
- C Squadron (Vancouver)

=== 1st Searchlight Regiment, RCA (15 May 1939) ===
A Squadron in Kamloops disbanded and remainder of the regiment converted to artillery

- 1st Searchlight Battery, RCA
- 3rd Searchlight Battery, RCA

== Alliances ==
Since the 1920s, the 5th British Columbia Light Horse and later the British Columbia Hussars were allied to the 4th Queen's Own Hussars.

== Battle honours ==
- Ypres, 1915
- Festubert, 1915

== See also ==
- List of regiments of cavalry of the Canadian Militia (1900–1920)
