= Navy Band Northwest =

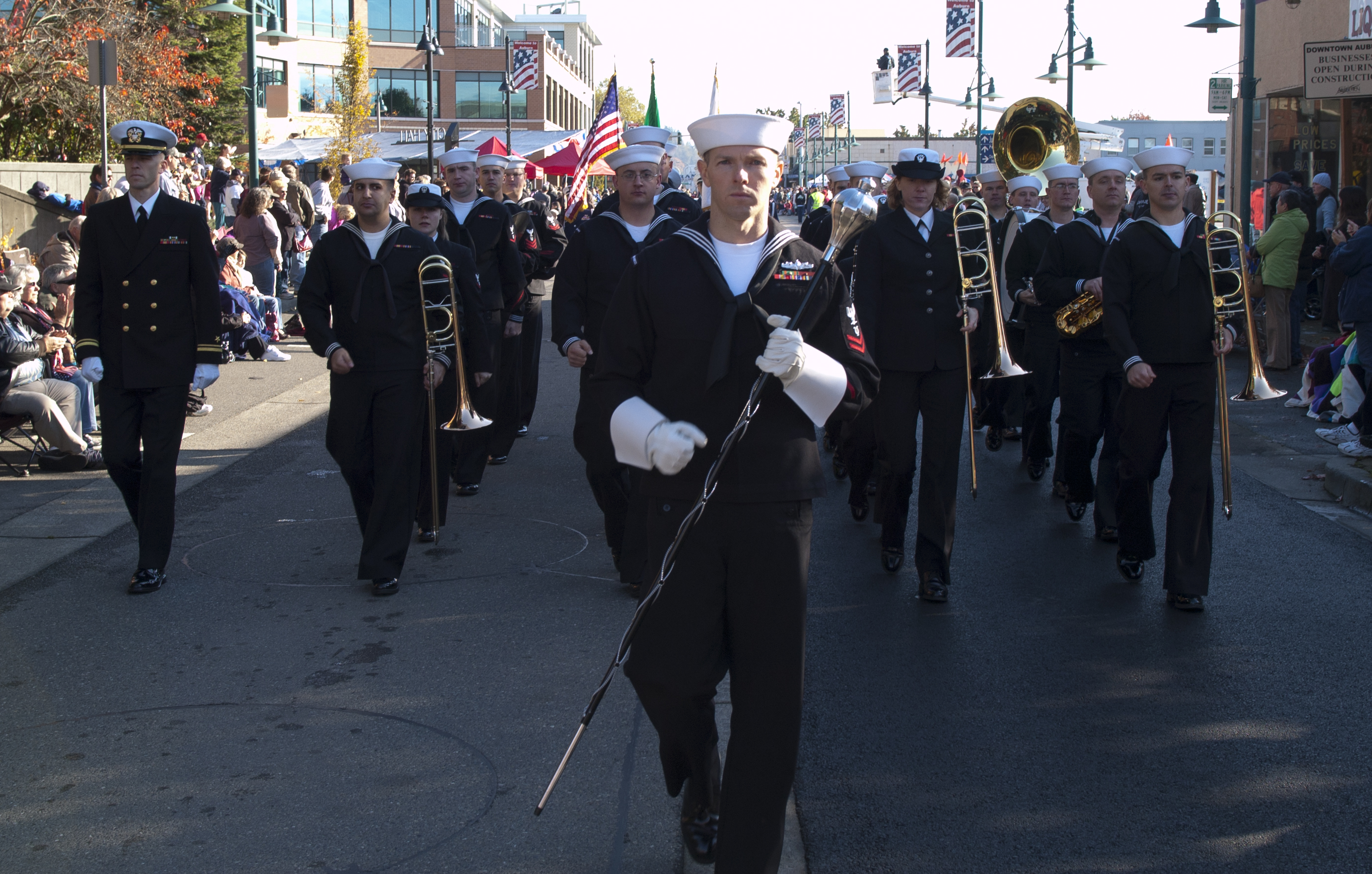
Navy Band Northwest performing at the Veterans Day parade.

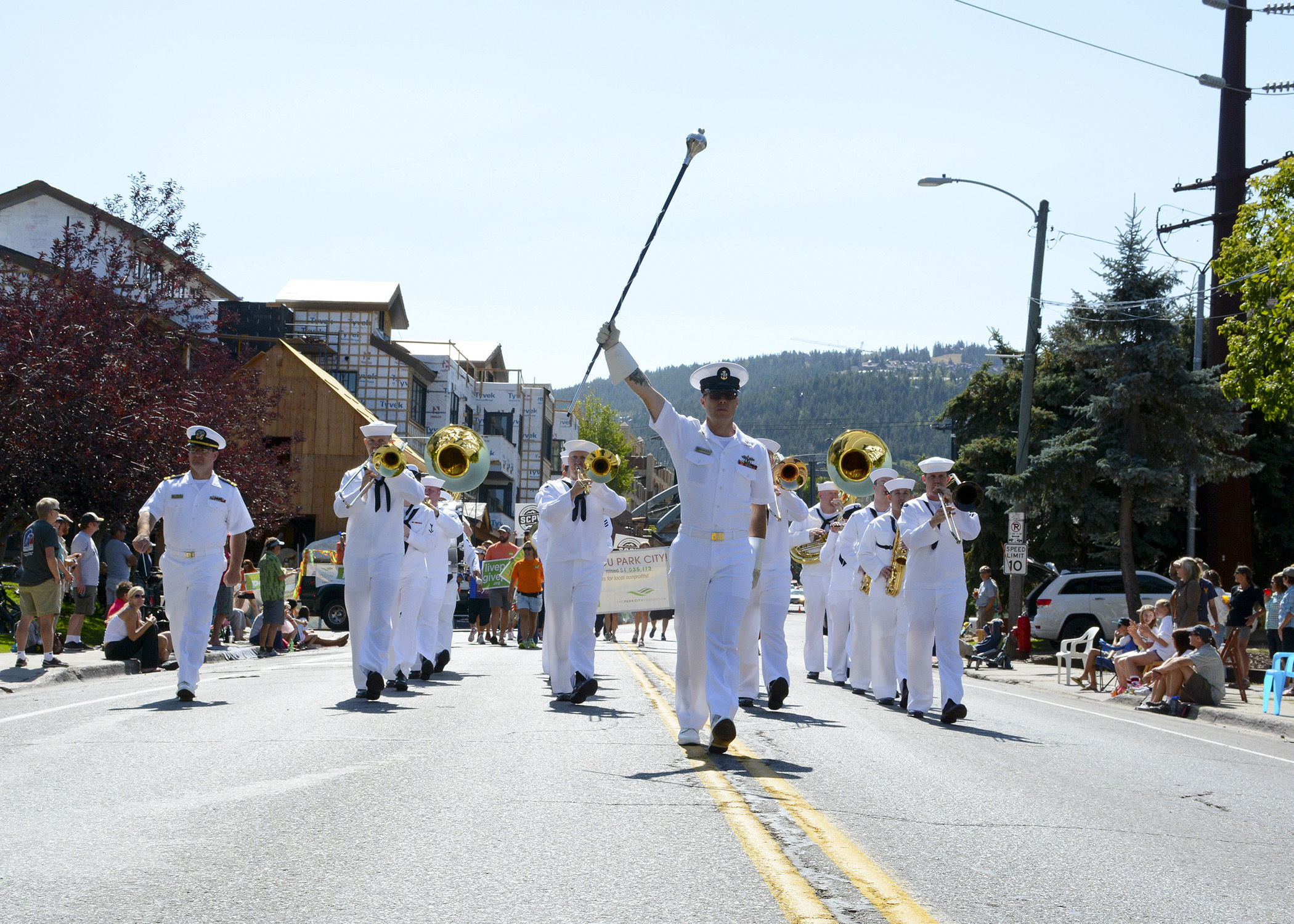
The band during Salt Lake City Navy Week.

Navy Band Northwest is a military band of the United States Navy. The band is composed of professional navy musicians who operate under the direct control and supervision of Fleet Band Activities and fall under the jurisdiction of Navy Region Northwest. Navy Band Northwest is one of 13 official Navy bands located throughout the continental United States, Hawaii, Italy and Japan.

== History ==
The band's history dates back to the Bremerton Navy Yard Band (formed in 1918) and the 13th Naval District Band (formed 1925). In 1944, a group of sailors formed a band at Naval Air Station Sand Point in Seattle. The band was created in honor of the arrival of the F6F Hellcat Fighter Squadron of Carrier Aircraft Support Unit 7 returning from combat operations in the South Pacific during World War II. The band as a result became known as the "Hellcat Band" .

The 13th Naval District Band was officially commissioned in 1953 at Pier 91. The band moved to Naval Air Station Sand Point in autumn 1970 where its name was changed to Navy Band Northwest and then to Navy Band Seattle. In April 1985, the band moved into Building 30, which was symbolic in that the building was part of the hangar where the Hellcat Band welcomed home the airmen that returned from combat. It was closed in 1995 as a result of the Base Realignment and Closure Commission, resulting in the band to move across the Puget Sound to a newly inaugurated facility at Naval Submarine Base Bangor in Silverdale in February 1995. It then officially changed its name to Navy Band Northwest on 1 April 1999 as a result of the navy's regionalization initiatives.

== Mission ==
The mission of Navy Band Northwest is to provide musical support for official Navy functions and recruiting efforts. The 35 professional musicians in that band can be called upon to perform in various units and formations: Ceremonial/Parade Band, Big Band, Contemporary Entertainment Ensemble, Brass Quintet, and Jazz Combo. From time to time, specialized ensembles such as a Brass or wind ensemble are formed to fulfill a specific performance requirement. In addition to their musical duties, band members carry out all administrative and support functions within the band. One of the more consistent performances it gives is an annual international band concert with the Naden Band of Maritime Forces Pacific, the Band of the 15th Field Regiment (RCA) and the I Corps Band at the Bremerton Performing Arts Center.

=== Five Star Brass ===
This ensemble is composed of two Trumpets, French Horn, Trombone and Tuba. Its repertoire includes styles such as classical, dixieland, jazz and contemporary. It is regularly featured at Concerts throughout the Puget Sound in local Navy and civilian communities.

== See also ==
- Pacific Fleet Band
- Seventh Fleet Band
- Royal New Zealand Navy Band
