= Point Atkinson Lighthouse =

Lighthouse in British Columbia, Canada

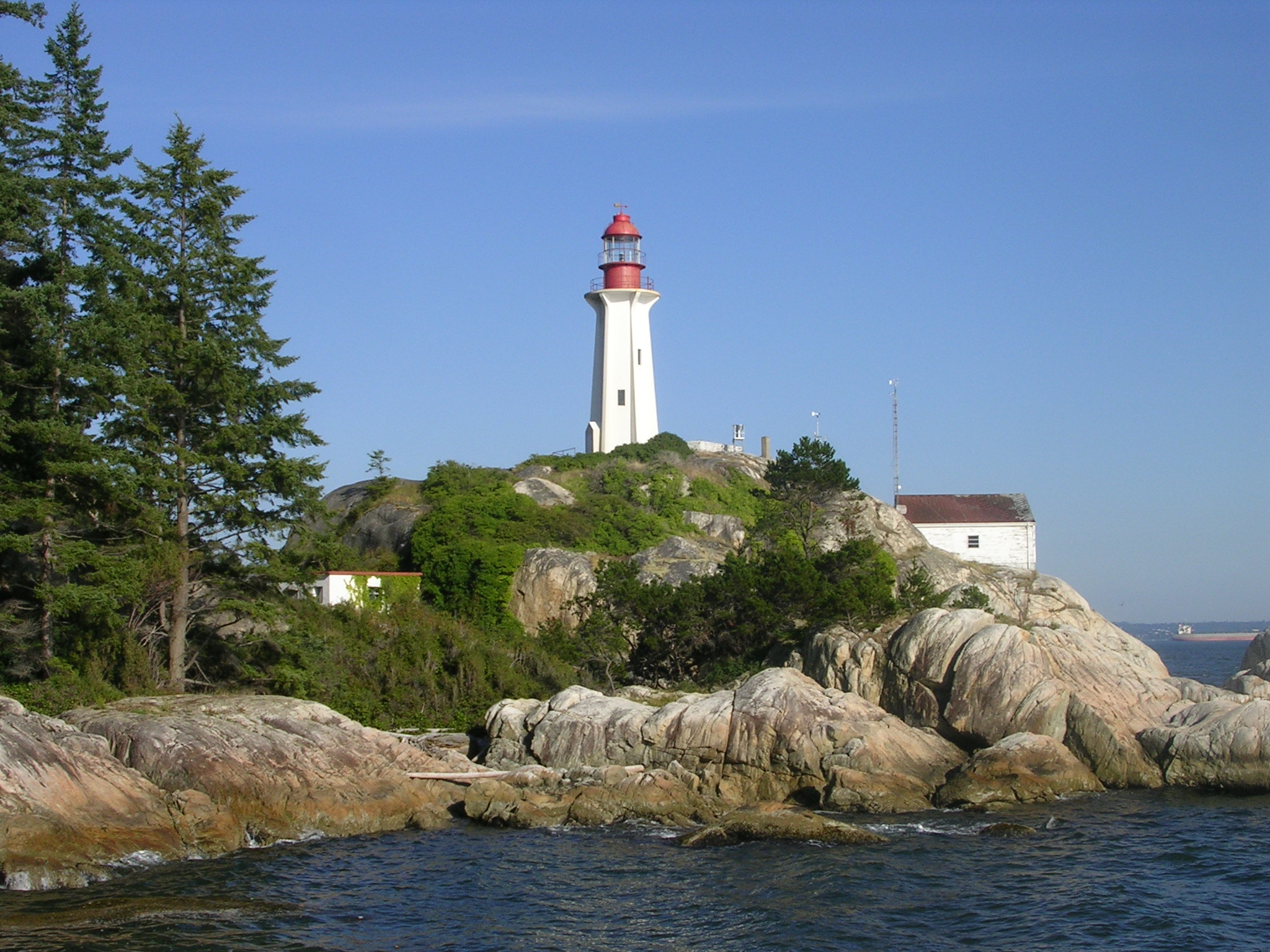
- The lighthouse is located to alert ships entering Burrard Inlet.
- Location: Strait of Georgia; Burrard Inlet; West Vancouver; British Columbia; Canada
- Coordinates: 49°19′49″N 123°15′53″W

Tower
- Constructed: 1875 (first); 1912 (current)
- Construction: concrete tower
- Automated: 1996
- Height: 18 metres (59 ft)
- Shape: octagonal truncated six ribbed tower with balcony and lantern
- Markings: white tower, red balcony and lantern
- Operator: West Vancouver Lighthouse Park
- Heritage: national Historic Sites of Canada, recognized federal heritage building of Canada

Light
- First lit: 1912
- Focal height: 33 metres (108 ft)
- Range: 15 nmi (28 km; 17 mi)
- Characteristic: Fl (2) W 5s.

History
- Built: 1912

Site notes
- Architect: William Anderson
- Governing body: District of West Vancouver
- Website: District of West Vancouver: Lighthouse Park

National Historic Site of Canada
- Designated: May 18, 1974
- Reference no.: 12768

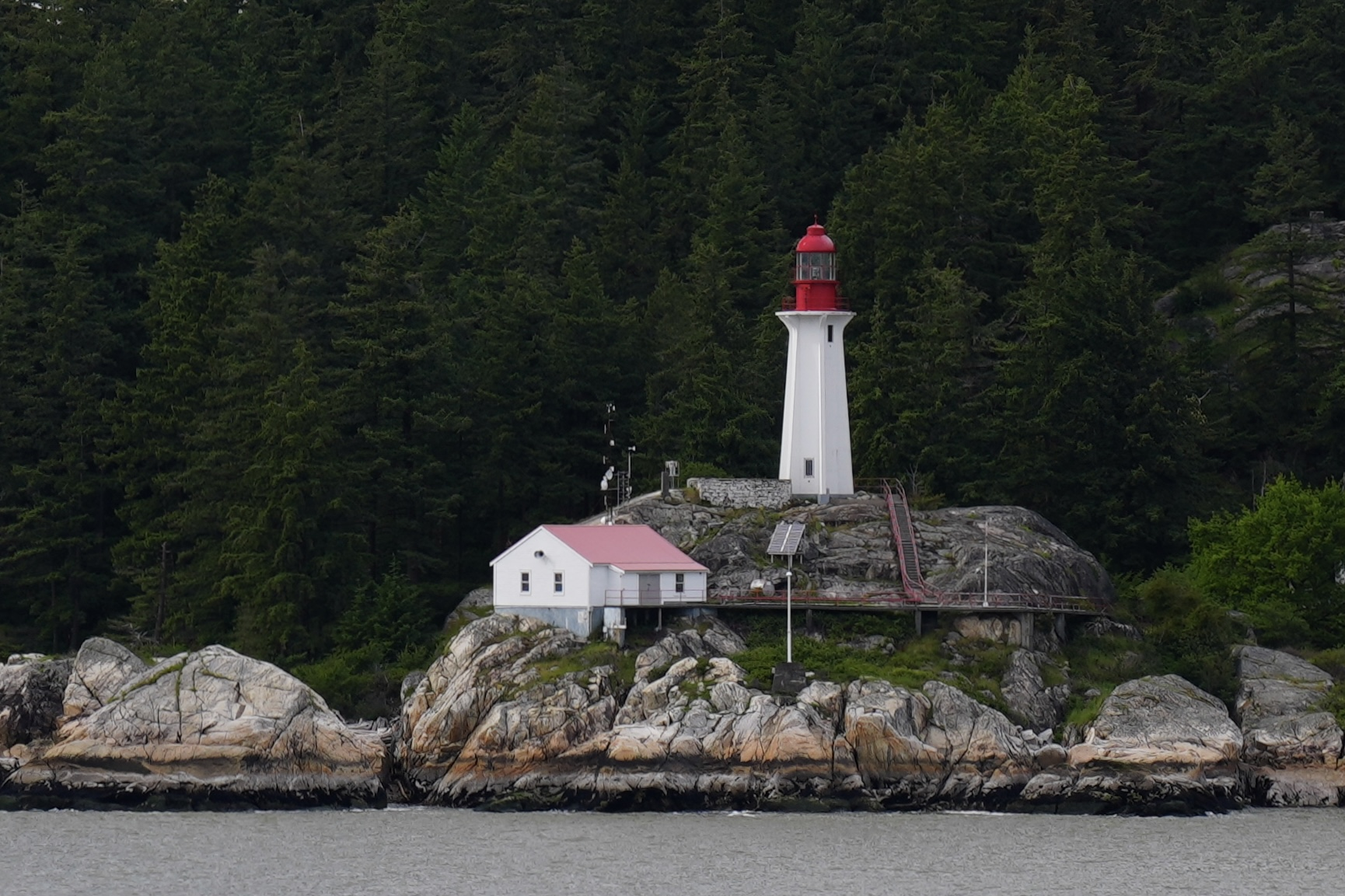
Point Atkinson Lighthouse in 2022

Point Atkinson Lighthouse is a lighthouse erected on Point Atkinson, a headland in West Vancouver, British Columbia named after Captain George Vancouver in 1792, when he was exploring the Pacific Northwest in the ship Discovery. The first wooden lighthouse went into service in 1875 and was replaced by a reinforced concrete structure in 1914.

== History ==
The first lighthouse at the site was a wooden structure with an attached keeper's house, built by Arthur Finney of Nanaimo in 1874. It did not go into service until the following year because initially the wrong light was sent from England. The beacon was lit for the first time 17 March 1875.

The light was 95 ft (29 m) above the sea and was visible for 14 mi (23 km). When the visibility was poor, ship captains would sound their foghorn three times, prompting the lightkeeper to pump a horn by hand until the vessel signalled that it was safe to desist.

In 1889, Canadian Pacific Steamships demanded that a fog alarm be added. This was located in a separate building to the west of the lighthouse. It had a rotating drum which was driven by steam to make an audible sound. In 1902, this was replaced by a diaphone fog alarm in which a slotted piston moved inside a similarly slotted cylinder.

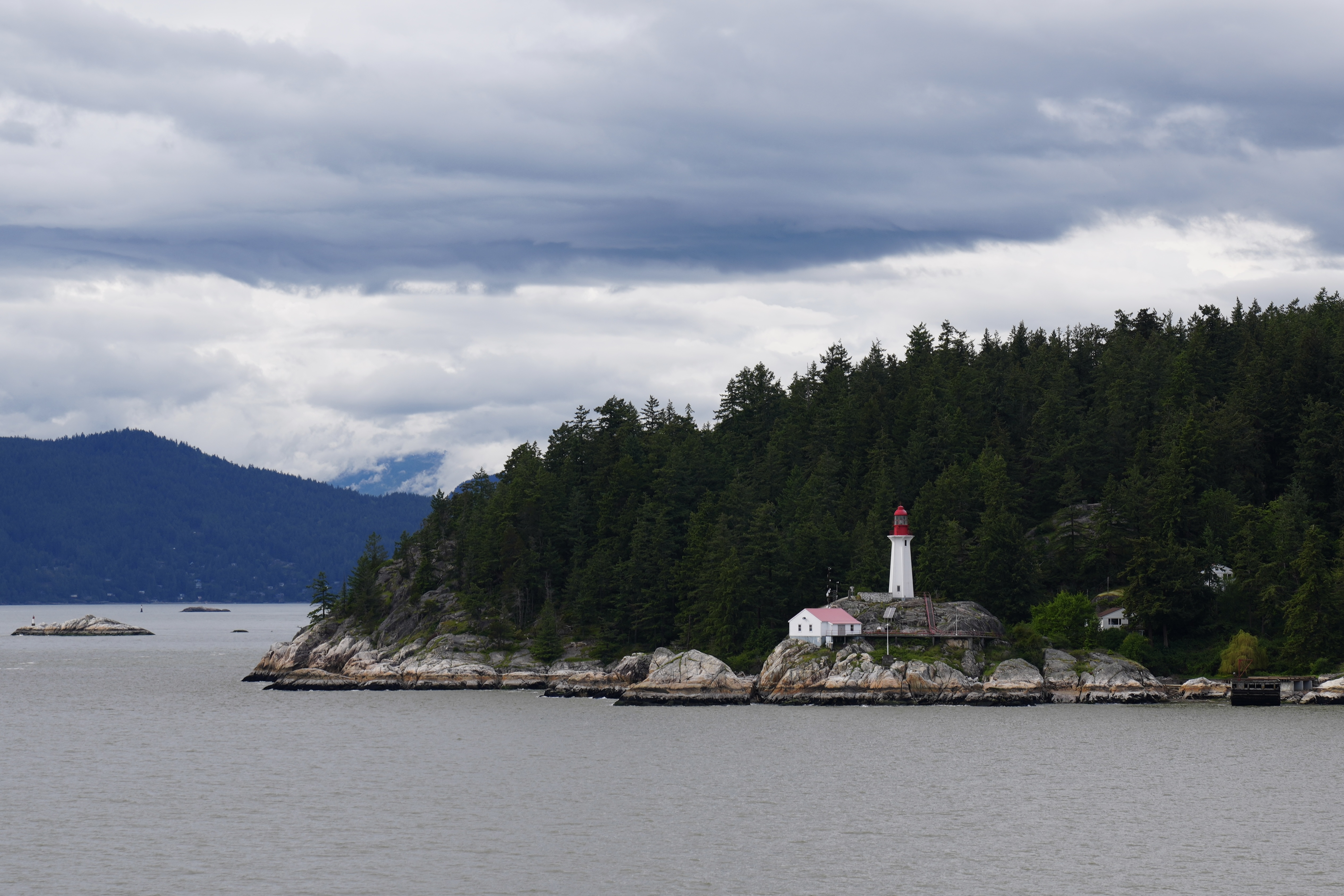
Point Atkinson Lighthouse in May 2022

The present lighthouse was built in 1914 on granite boulders jutting out into Burrard Inlet in West Vancouver, Canada. The concrete structure was considered at the time innovative in lighthouse design. It is now automated and still in use.

The Point Atkinson Lighthouse may be reached by hiking the Valley Trail in Lighthouse Park.

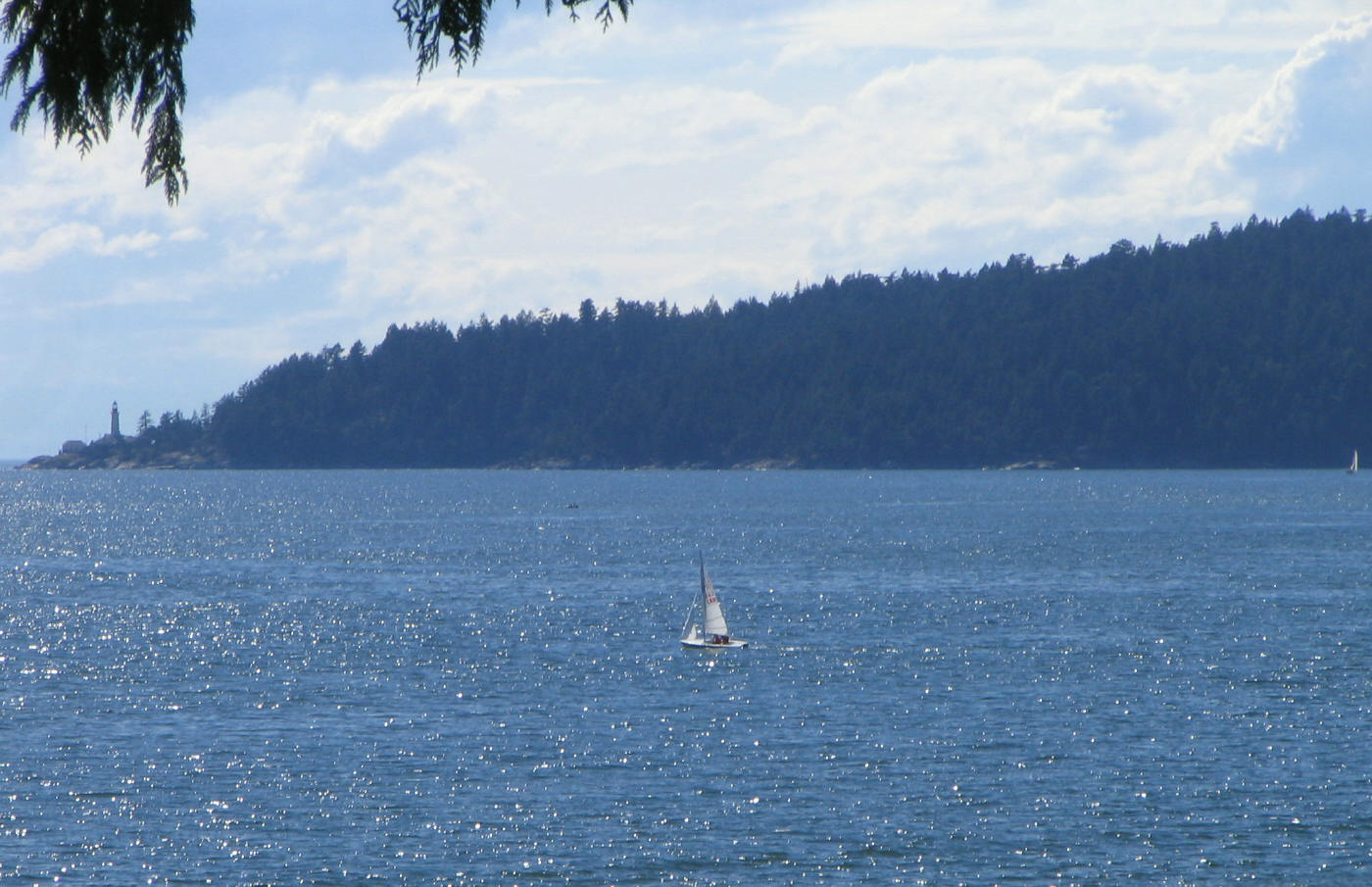
Lighthouse Park as seen from Altamont in the east

== Keepers ==
- Edward Woodward 1874–1877
- Robert G. Wellwood 1877–1880
- Walter Erwin 1880–1910
- Thomas David Grafton 1910–1933
- Lawrence Walter Grafton 1933–1935
- Ernest Charles Dawe 1935–1961
- Gordon Odlum 1961–1976
- James Barr 1976–1978
- Oscar Edwards 1978–1980
- Gerald D. Watson 1980–1996
- Donald Graham 1980–1996

== See also ==
- List of lighthouses in British Columbia
- List of lighthouses in Canada
- Lighthouse Park
- List of national historic sites of Canada
- Henri de Miffonis
- Brockton Point
