= Duke of Edinburgh's Royal Regiment =

Infantry regiment of the British Army from 1959 to 1994

The Duke of Edinburgh's Royal Regiment
- Active: 1959–1994
- Country: United Kingdom
- Branch: British Army
- Type: Infantry
- Role: Line Infantry
- Garrison/HQ: Brock Barracks, Reading
- Nickname: 'The Farmers Boys'
- March: Quick: The Farmer's Boy; Slow: Auld Robin Grey
- Anniversaries: Maiwand (27 July 1880); Ferozeshah (21 December 1845); Battle of Tofrek (22 March 1885)

The Duke of Edinburgh's Royal Regiment (Berkshire and Wiltshire) was an infantry regiment of the British Army.

== History ==
=== Earlier history ===
The regiment was formed on 9 June 1959 after defence cuts implemented in the late 1950s saw the amalgamation of the Royal Berkshire Regiment (Princess Charlotte of Wales's) and Wiltshire Regiment (Duke of Edinburgh's), forming the Duke of Edinburgh's Royal Regiment (Berkshire and Wiltshire). The amalgamation parade to create the new regiment took place at Albany Barracks, Isle of Wight, when it also received its first set of Colours, presented by its Colonel-in-Chief, the Prince Philip, Duke of Edinburgh.

Until the early 1980s, the regiment's administrative headquarters (RHQ) was at Brock Barracks, Reading, Berkshire, with a secondary or subsidiary headquarters at Le Marchant Barracks, Devizes, Wiltshire, but by 1982 a single RHQ had been permanently established in the Cathedral Close at Salisbury, Wiltshire, with the DERR regimental museum, - including the museum collections of the former Royal Berkshire Regiment and the Wiltshire Regiment - established on the ground floor of the same historic building, which had for several centuries been known locally as The Wardrobe.

The regimental badge of the new regiment was a silver cross patee (from the badge of the former Wiltshire Regiment), at the centre of which was a silver Chinese-style dragon (from the badge of the former Royal Berkshire Regiment). The Chinese dragon was surrounded by a gilt/gold double coil of naval rope (commemorating the service of the former regiments' service as marines, especially that of the 49th Regiment of Foot at the Battle of Copenhagen in 1801). This rope coil was surmounted by the ducal coronet of the regiment's Colonel-in-Chief in gilt/gold. The badge was invariably set upon a piece of red material known as the Brandywine Flash (commemorating the regiment's action at the Battle of Brandywine in 1777, during the American Revolutionary War). This red backing was configured as a square (with the red colour showing between the four arms of the cross patee) where the badge was worn as a collar badge or on a peaked cap, but as an inverted triangle approximately 2 X 2.5 inches in size where it was worn on the beret.

The first posting for the 1st Battalion (1 DERR) in 1959 was in Tidworth, Wiltshire and it was from there in June 1960 that B Company arrived in the Bahamas to augment the in-place garrison unit in the Caribbean, the 1st Battalion the Royal Hampshire Regiment (1 R HAMPS). The following year, ethnic violence in British Guiana saw 1 DERR send a company to assist the re-establishment of order. In December 1962 the battalion arrived in Malta for a deployment that would last just over three years. While based there, 1 DERR deployed to Cyprus in February 1964, a month before the establishment of the United Nations Peacekeeping Force in Cyprus (UNIFICYP), returning to Malta in April, although subsequently the battalion did carry out further operational deployments to Cyprus. Malta became independent from Great Britain on 21 September 1964 and the battalion fulfilled a major role in the ceremonial parade and associated events staged for this occasion. In January 1966, 1 DERR arrived in Minden, West Germany as part of the British Army of the Rhine (BAOR) for a three-year posting as a mechanized infantry battalion. In West Germany the battalion formed part of the 11th Infantry Brigade. From that location its soldiers trained in Libya, Norway, and France. The battalion moved to Catterick in June 1969, and thereafter successive companies carried out deployments to the Central American colony of British Honduras. In addition, A Company trained in Malaysia in 1969 and the entire battalion trained in Canada in 1970. In August 1969 C Company was sent to Derry to reinforce the 1st Battalion of the Queen's Regiment (1 QUEENS) at the start of many years of violent turmoil that were in due course termed The Troubles. C Company remained in Northern Ireland until December. The following year, B Company was dispatched to Belfast to support 1st Battalion the Royal Scots (1 RS). In 1971 1 DERR deployed to Derry for its first tour of duty in Northern Ireland as a complete battalion.

=== Later history ===
Between 1969 and 1993 the battalion saw extensive service in Northern Ireland, completing a number of operational tours of duty and, in the process, losing nine men (including two while serving away from 1 DERR on detached duty). Returning briefly to Catterick after its 1971 tour in Northern Ireland, 1 DERR next moved to West Berlin, an enclave deep within and therefore entirely surrounded by Communist East Germany, where the battalion joined the British Berlin Brigade, serving alongside two other British infantry battalions and the allied US and French troops who together bore responsibility for the defence of West Berlin throughout the Cold War period. One of the battalion's duties included guarding the last remaining prisoner at Spandau Prison, Adolf Hitler's former deputy Rudolf Hess. From West Berlin the battalion carried out annual training deployments to West Germany and southern France. From Berlin, 1 DERR returned yet again to Northern Ireland in mid-1973. In 1975, following its eighteen-month posting to Abercorn Barracks in Ballykinler, Northern Ireland, 1 DERR moved to Shoeburyness, Essex. In August that year the battalion deployed to Cyprus on an Emergency Tour, returning in February 1976. Subsequently, it assumed a new role as the Infantry Demonstration Battalion, based at Warminster, Wiltshire. In August 1978 the battalion moved to Osnabrück, West Germany, again joining BAOR, this time as a mechanized battalion of the 12th Armoured Brigade of the 1st British Corps. There it remained until 1983, when it moved back to the United Kingdom and barracks in Canterbury, Kent. However, while in Osnabrück, it did carry out a further operational tour in Northern Ireland in 1979. In addition, a few months after its arrival at Canterbury, 1 DERR began an operational tour in South Armagh, Northern Ireland, from June to October 1983.

In 1984 the battalion was presented with new Queen's and Regimental Colours by its Colonel-in-Chief, the Prince Philip, Duke of Edinburgh. That December it joined UNFICYP in Cyprus, returning home again in June 1985. In February 1988, following another lengthy tour of duty based at Aldergrove in Northern Ireland between 1985 and 1988, 1 DERR was posted to Hong Kong for two years, joining the colony's military garrison as the single non-Gurkha infantry battalion within the 48th Gurkha Infantry Brigade. Based at Stanley Fort on Hong Kong Island, the battalion carried out a wide range of internal security duties, which included patrolling the border with the People's Republic of China to deter and prevent illegal immigration into Hong Kong. From Hong Kong, 1 DERR returned to the United Kingdom and Catterick in July 1990, where it joined the 24th Airmobile Brigade. Another operational tour in County Fermanagh, Northern Ireland followed from December 1990 to May 1991.

On 23 July 1991, it was announced that (together with a number of other regiments) the Duke of Edinburgh's Royal Regiment would be required to amalgamate with another infantry regiment, in accordance with government decisions taken to expedite the Options for Change reductions in the army consequent upon the end of the Cold War. In 1 DERR's case it was required in due course to amalgamate with the 1st Battalion the Gloucestershire Regiment (1 GLOSTERS), at which time both of these regiments would cease to exist as individual regiments or battalions.

The last tour of duty carried out by 1 DERR in Northern Ireland was from March 1993, during which 1 DERR lost two men before the battalion finally returned to Catterick in September. The wider regiment, but specifically its 1st Battalion (1 DERR), ceased to exist on 27 July 1994, when 1 DERR amalgamated with 1 GLOSTERS, to form the 1st Battalion the Royal Gloucestershire, Berkshire and Wiltshire Regiment (1 RGBW).

== Authorised history ==
In 1998 an authorised history of the Duke of Edinburgh's Royal Regiment (Berkshire and Wiltshire) was published, this work having been commissioned by the regimental committee a few years earlier, in the wake of the 1994 amalgamation. This comprehensive account of the regiment focuses extensively upon 1 DERR, describing all aspects of its life and times, and its numerous operational, peacetime and training activities and tours of duty about the world, as well as placing these subjects within wider military/political contexts of the period 1959-1994, especially those involved with aspects of the Cold War. The work also includes details of regimental insignia, uniforms, battle honours, the Queen's and Regimental Colours, the origins and development of the RHQ and museum, the regimental march, regimental traditions and officers' mess customs, and listings of the Colonels of the Regiment, and the Commanding Officers and Regimental Sergeant Majors of 1 DERR. There is also a regimental Roll of Honour showing details of the nine soldiers who fell while serving with 1 DERR on operations between 1973 and 1993, or while serving with other units elsewhere.

== Other information ==
- Colonel-in-Chief: The Prince Philip, Duke of Edinburgh

=== Band ===
During its existence, the regiment maintained a regimental band and a corps of drums. It took part in many different ceremonies on behalf of the regiment, including the Beating Retreat with the Pipes & Drums of the Ulster Defence Regiment. In August 1979, members of the regimental band were hurt in the 1979 Brussels bombing on the Grand-Place, carried out by volunteers belonging to the Provisional Irish Republican Army (IRA). The bombing injured seven bandsmen and eleven civilians. Fatalities were avoided as only some of the band's 30 members arrived (the rest were stuck in city traffic) and the band members that were there were dressing away from the stage.

=== Alliances ===
Alliances included:

- The Lincoln and Welland Regiment—Canada (1959–1994)
- The Algonquin Regiment—Canada (1959–1994)
- The Hawke's Bay Regiment—New Zealand
- The Duke of Edinburgh's Own Rifles—the former Union of South Africa Defence Forces
- 7th Battalion (Wellington (City of Wellington's Own) and Hawke's Bay), Royal New Zealand Infantry Regiment
- 13th Battalion, Frontier Force Regiment—Pakistan

== Freedoms ==
The regiment received the Freedom of several locations throughout its history; these include:

- (England) 1960: Windsor and Maidenhead
- (England) 1970: Abingdon.
