= Lighthouse Park =

National historic site of Canada

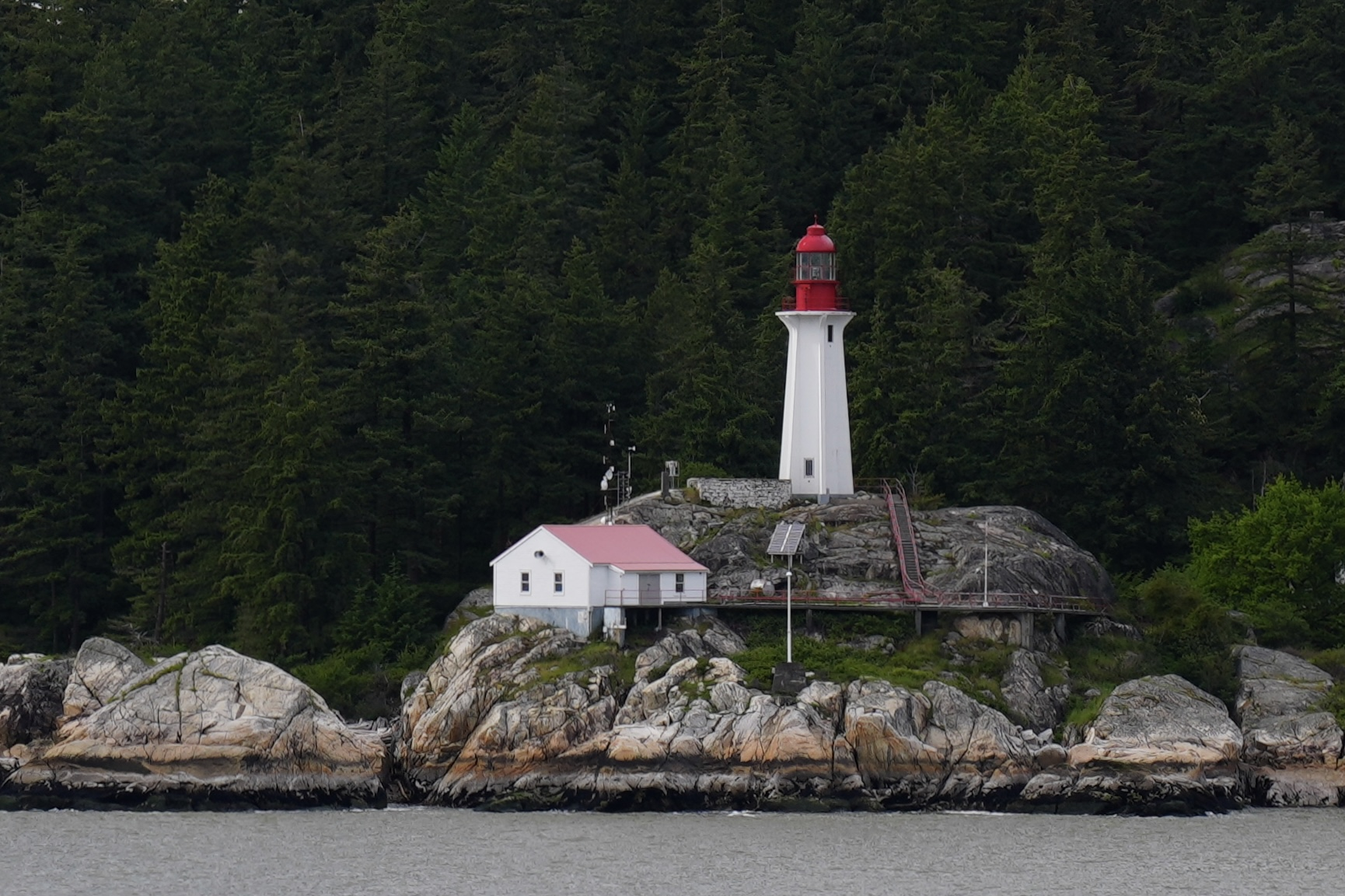
- Point Atkinson Lighthouse in 2022
- Interactive map of Lighthouse Park
- Type: Neighbourhood Park
- Location: West Vancouver, Canada
- Coordinates: 49.336°N 123.262°W
- Area: 75 hectares (190 acres)
- Created: 1792
- Operator: District of West Vancouver
- Open: 7:00 a.m. – 10:00 p.m.
- Status: Open year round
- Designation: National Historic Site of Canada
- Website: westvancouver.ca/parks-recreation/parks-trails/lighthouse-park

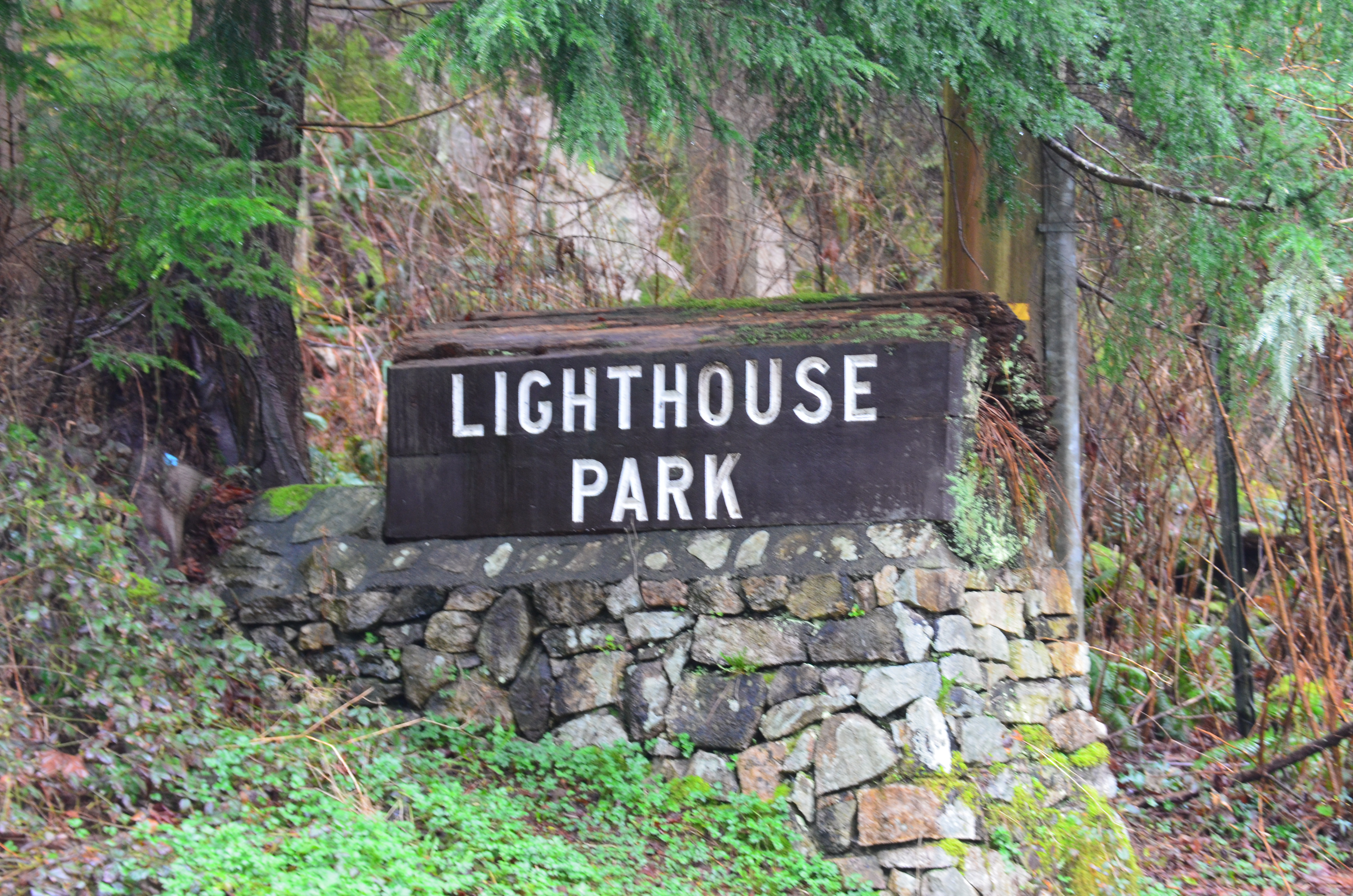
Entrance flagstone to the park

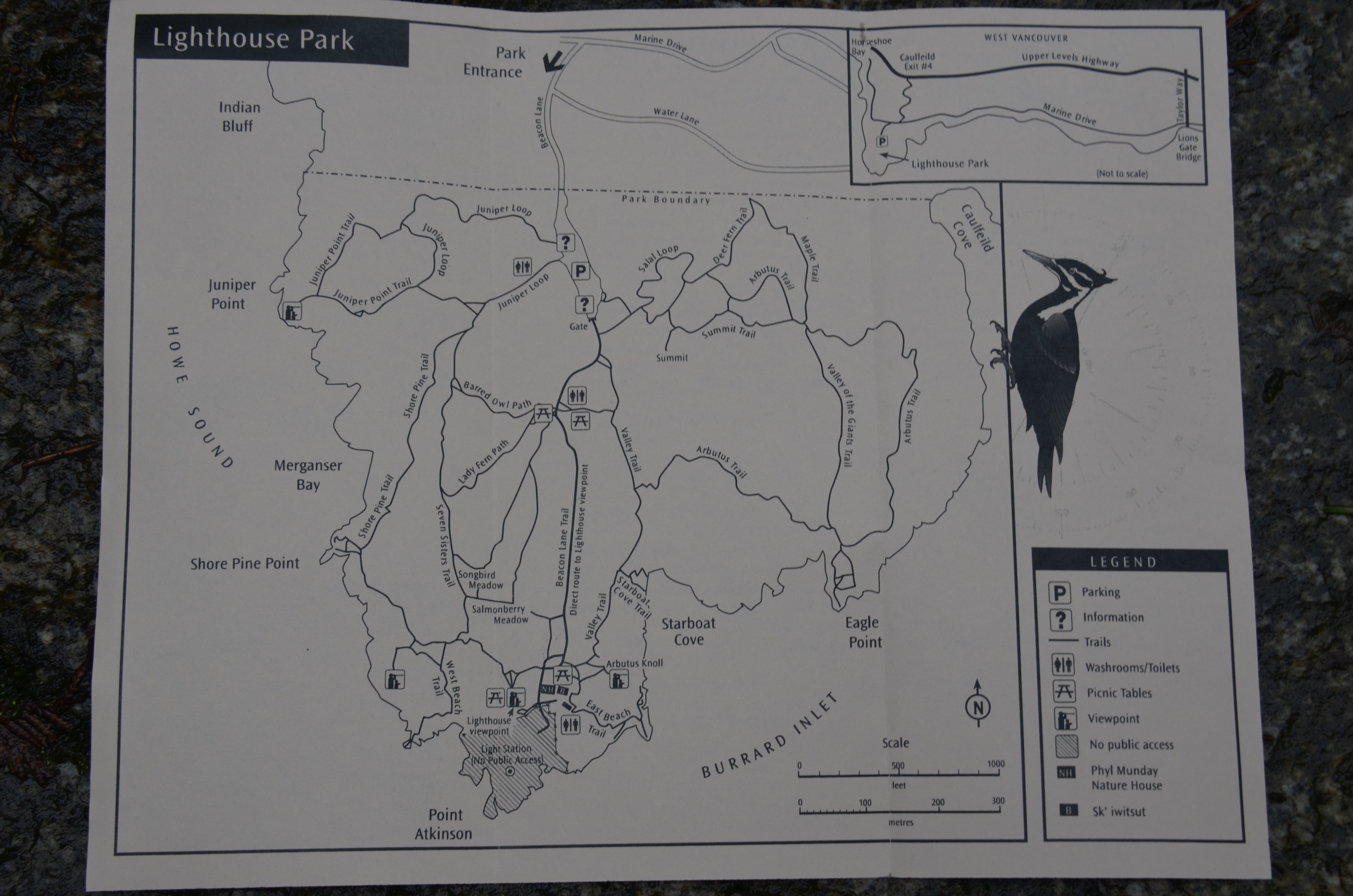
Map of Lighthouse Park offered at the entrance

Lighthouse Park is a neighbourhood park located in a residential area in West Vancouver, Canada. It is a popular tourist attraction for visitors to Vancouver as it is a National Historic Site of Canada. It is a well-maintained park, and is open year-round throughout all four seasons. The park is known for the Point Atkinson Lighthouse, located at the southernmost tip of the peninsula. The park is made up of 75 hectares (182 acres) of mostly virgin rainforest, and was founded in 1792. The District of West Vancouver maintains and operates the park and permits visitors from 7:00 a.m. to 10:00 p.m. Visitors to this park can enjoy the various beginner level hiking trails, as well as bring their dogs for a walk or have lunch along the rocks of the beach near the Lighthouse. There are various picnic benches scattered throughout the trails of the park, yet none near the beach and the lighthouse itself.

== History ==
Lighthouse Park was originally known as Sk’iwitsut - meaning "turn your canoe" and was later named Point Atkinson by the colonizers in 1792. It was discovered by Captain George Vancouver aboard the Discovery, and he consequently was the one who named the area. Captain Vancouver recorded that he had named this point on Howe Sound after a "particular friend". Unfortunately he neglected to identify the friend. The most likely candidate appears to be Thomas Atkinson, RN, who later was master of HMS Victory during the Battle of Trafalgar.

The first lighthouse was resurrected in 1874 as a gift from the Federal Government of Canada in exchange for B.C agreeing to join Canada in 1871. The 182 acres of forest set aside in 1881 by the Dominion of Canada served as a dark backdrop of the lighthouse, and a source of fuel for the steam-powered foghorn of the lighthouse. This forest that was set aside in 1881 became what we call Lighthouse Park in present day. This first lighthouse was built by Arthur Finney of Nanaimo, and was made of wood accompanied by an attached keepers dwelling, where the lighthouse keeper of the time resided.

The current lighthouse that visitors to the park can observe was built in 1912. The forest that resides behind the lighthouse was then leased to the newly founded District of West Vancouver. During World War 2 the lighthouse was used for surveillance of the Burrard Inlet for enemy submarines and ships. It was respectively equipped with gun emplacements and search lights. Behind the lighthouse construction took place to provide facilities for The Department of National Defence billeted conscripts. These facilities included a bunkhouse, Officer's mess hall, dining hall and a guard hut.

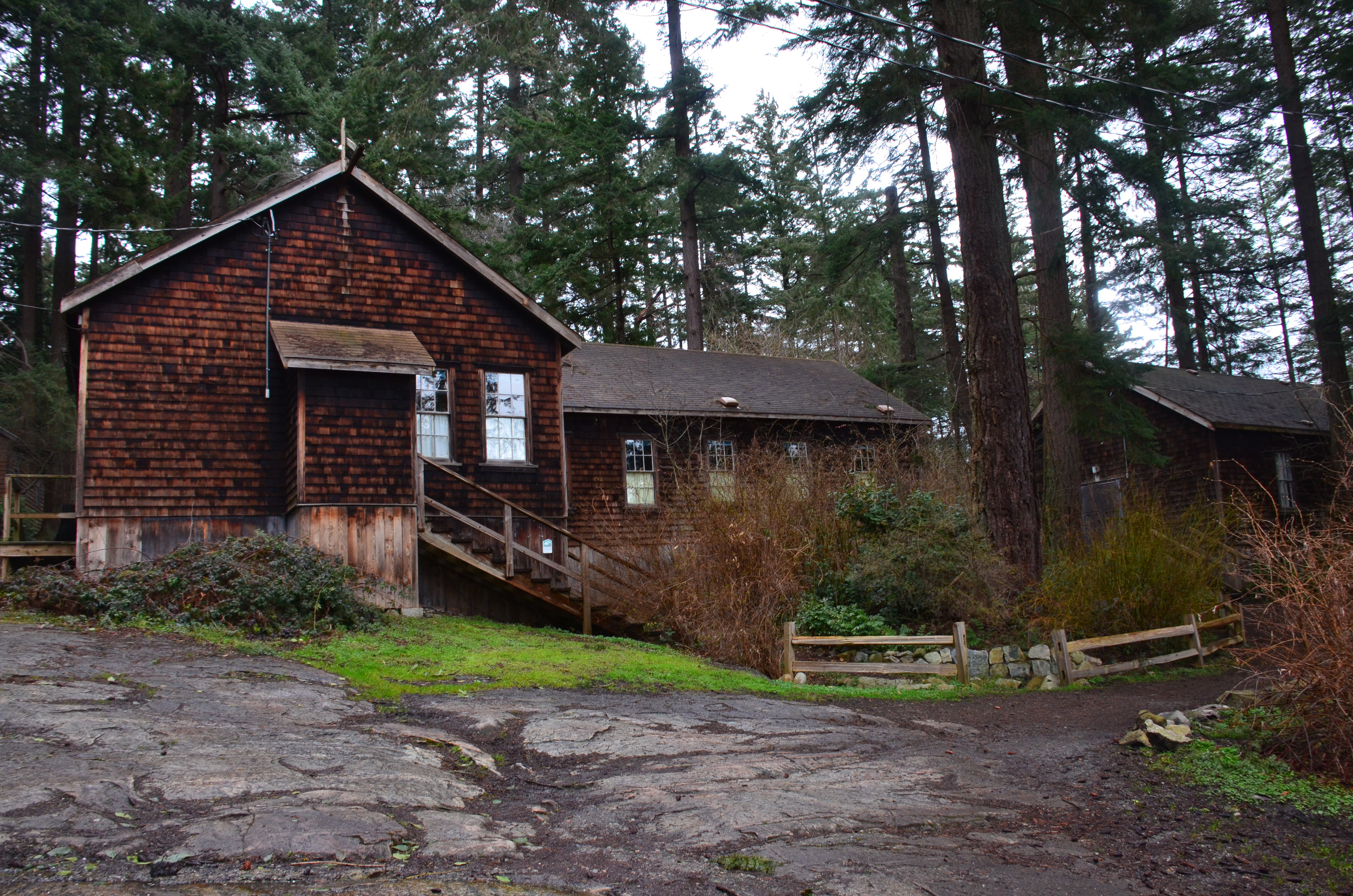
Cabins that housed those that protected the coast from the Japanese in World War 2

In 1994 the area was declared a National Historic Site of Canada.

== Flora ==
There is an abundance of vegetation throughout the park. However, the native species suffer from the encroachment of invasive species and "wear-and-tear". There is currently a project to replant much of the vegetation along the pathways of the park in order to benefit the overall aesthetic of Lighthouse Park.

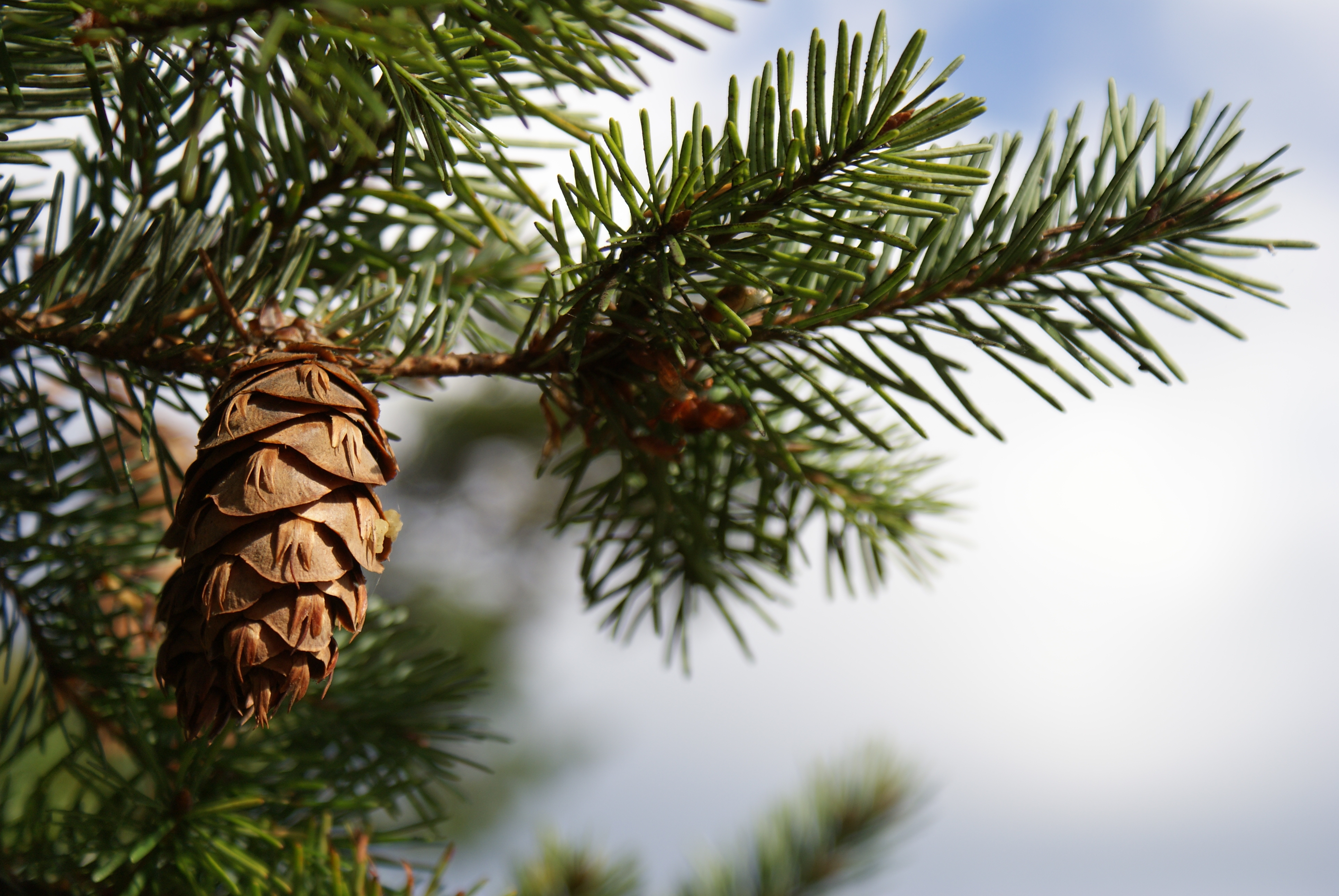

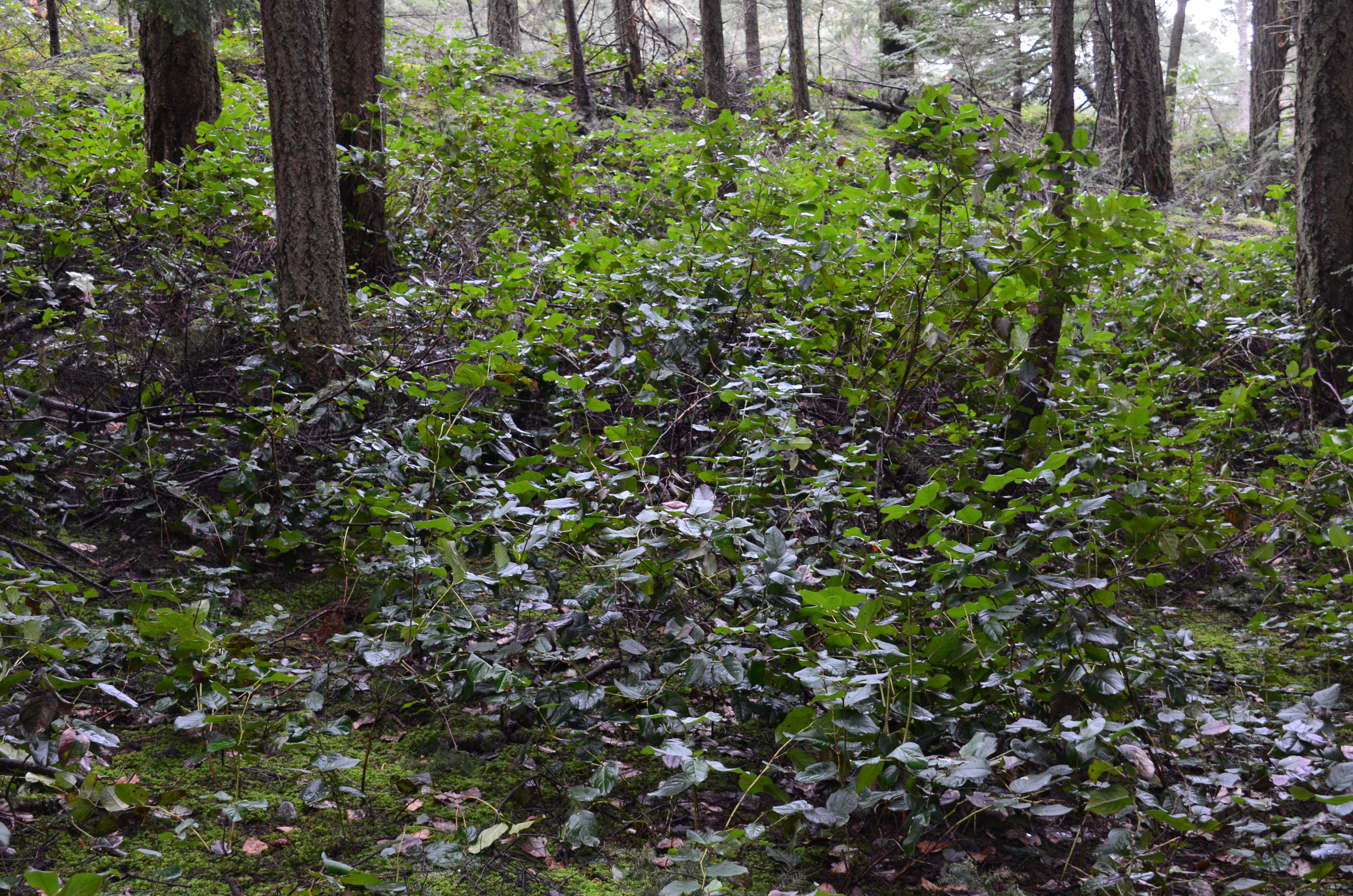
The local salal plant covering the ground under the Douglas Fir trees in Lighthouse Park

=== Douglas fir ===
Douglas firs (Pseudotsuga menziesii) provide the logging industry with a significant portion of their revenue. They often dominate the forest canopy, and once at maturity these trees reach immense heights and size. Before the man-made skyline of Vancouver of modern day, the Douglas fir defined the skies of Vancouver. When the first European settlers arrived in Vancouver, they were amazed by the scale of the 1,000 year old Douglas fir trees. Some of the tallest trees on earth grew here. The Douglas fir remains to this day as the North America's most important tree for forestry for construction, furniture, and pulp.

=== Western red cedar ===
Along the Pacific coast Western red cedars (Thuja plicata) can be found from Northern California to Southern Alaska. The age range of these trees are between 800 and 1,000 years old, with the oldest living up to 2,000 years in California. The wood from these trees is used extensively in the forestry industry, much like the Douglas fir. However, there needs to be an increase in regulation of the management of these trees, as they are currently being used faster than they can grow.

=== Arbutus tree ===
Arbutus menziesii is best known for its smooth, red-orange bark and is native to warm climates of the Mediterranean, Western Europe and North America. Arbutus trees grow vibrant red berries which are edible with the taste resembling that of a fig. The Straits Salish people of Vancouver Island used this tree for medicine to help treat colds, tuberculosis and stomach problems. This tree was also the symbol for many myths of the Straits Salish people.

=== Salal ===
The salal (Gaultheria shallon) is an evergreen plant with thick, tough egg-shaped leaves that are shiny and dark green on the top surface and rough and lighter on the lower surface. It grows as far north as Alaska and as far South as California as it can thrive in both sunny and shady conditions. This plant grows dark blue berries that are edible and can act as an appetite suppressant. First Nations have used this plant for anti-inflammatory medicinal uses when prepared as a tea.

=== Sword fern ===
The sword fern (Polystichum munitum), one of the most abundant ferns in North America, can be found from Alaska to California and is named for its small upward-pointing lobe that resembles a sword hilt. This fern prefers to grow in moist, coniferous low elevation environments but can survive dry periods. Traditionally, this plant has been eaten when no other food source was available, can relieve the pain from the sting of a stinging nettle but now it is mostly used by florists as an ornament.

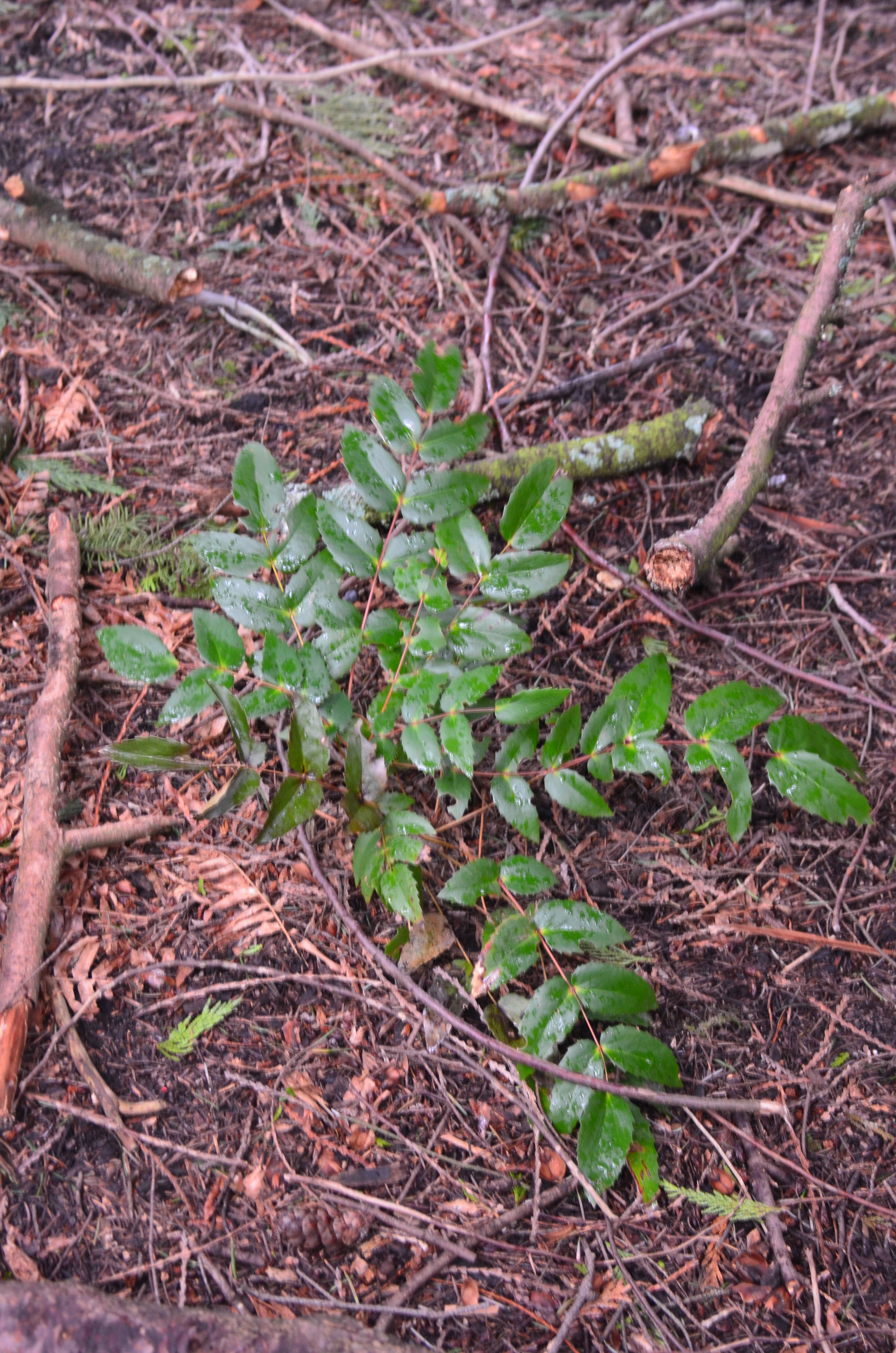
Oregon Grape that has not yet flowered

=== Oregon grape ===
The Oregon grape (Mahonia aquifolium) is a spiny leafed plant that blooms into yellow flowers in the spring with dark blue-black berries to follow. This plant is native to North America growing as far north as Southern Alaska, as far south as Northern California and as far east as Eastern Alberta. It thrives in forests with the Douglas fir although it can be found in other forests as well. The berries are edible, and the aboriginal peoples often combined them with the berries of the salal plant.

=== Elderberry ===
Native to North America, the elderberry is used mostly for its cream coloured flowers and dark blue or red berries. These flowers are fruits are used for treatment of minor diseases such as the flu or colds. However, the most common use is as a syrup made from the blossoms as an extract. Although the cooked berries are edible, raw berries can be quite poisonous. Even the leaves, twigs, branches, seeds and roots contain cyanidin glycoside which can cause illness after sufficient consumption.

== Hiking trails ==
There are many trails that exist throughout Lighthouse Park. These trails range from beginner to moderate in difficulty, and therefore Lighthouse Park is a great destination for beginner hikers and tourists. These trails lead the visitor to views of Burrard Inlet, as well as a scenic tour of the park itself. Beacon Lane and Valley of the Giants are two trails that are visitor favourites. Beacon Lane is a direct trail to the Lighthouse lookout point, and magnificent views of the Pacific Ocean. Valley of the Giants takes the hiker on a journey through many hundred year old Douglas firs, and will end with views of Eagle Point. A map is also available to ensure that visitors make the most of their visit to the park.

=== Safety ===
It is crucial for the visitor to ensure that they are practicing optimal safety procedures during their visit to Lighthouse Park. In the rain and snow the rocks along many of the trails and view points become slippery, and present a danger to hikers. When approaching the beach and the lighthouse visitors can venture over a rocky terrain that is right next to the water. This area can be particularly dangerous, as there are no barricades and visitors can slip off the edge of the massive rocks into the water from a high distance. When the terrain is dry, it is crucial to remember there is a strict fire ban at all times within the park.

=== Washroom locations ===
Restroom facilities can be found at various locations throughout the park, as there are three in total. The first can be found along the trail Juniper Loop, right outside of the Parking Lot. The second can be located near the picnic tables at the beginning of Beacon Lane trail. Lastly. the third washroom can be found along the East Beach trail near the Lighthouse Station.

== Pets ==
The park is a very popular spot among locals for dog walking. Dogs are permitted off-leash only along the trails to ensure the safety of the dogs as well as other users. There is a limit on three dogs per person that are allowed to be off leash, and they must be kept under-control. There are signs throughout the park to ensure dog owners are aware where their pets are welcome. Dogs are not welcome off of the trails, as they are only allowed on the trails. The entire park does not allow commercial dog walking. There are also many garbage bins throughout the park so cleaning up after your dogs has been made easy.

== Viewpoints ==
Below are some of the examples of the viewpoints.

=== West Beach ===
This viewpoint is one of the most popular as it has a great view of the lighthouse itself and allows you to look out into the Strait of Georgia. This view is accessible by a short walk west from the service buildings. Continuing west you arrive at a junction that starts you down the West Beach Trail.

=== Juniper Point ===
This view does not incorporate the lighthouse but instead gives you a great look toward Passage Island, Bowen Island and Howe Sound. The Juniper Loop Trail begins near the parking lot and heads to the northwest point of the park to this viewpoint.

=== Eagle Point ===
Located on the east side of the park, the Eagle Point view shows off the Burrard Inlet and looks across Vancouver as far as the Lions Gate Bridge. While this view point isn't the most popular among visitors, it is highly recommended for its beautiful hike along the Arbutus Trail and its quiet nature.

== Transportation access and community ==
Just outside the park is a small community that includes shopping, the ferry terminal, restaurants and a boat launch. The park is located in a residential neighbourhood, and is close to Rockridge Secondary and Caulfield Elementary School.

=== Car access ===
Accessing the park by car is simple, as the park is located close to Highway 99, otherwise known as the Trans-Canada Highway, and therefore simple for travellers who do not live in the area to access the park by car. Ample amounts of parking is available at the beginning of the park, and at the start of the trails, in a gravel parking lot designated for visitors arriving by car. Pay parking in effect.

=== Public-transit access ===
There are various buses that depart from Downtown Vancouver that take visitors to the park. Visitors can take the 250 Horseshoe Bay bus to get to the park. These buses leave from the bus stop at the intersection of West Georgia and Seymour Street. This bus ride takes an estimated 42 minutes to take visitors from Downtown Vancouver to Lighthouse Park.

=== Ferry access ===
The Horseshoe Bay Ferry Terminal serves as a port for foot passengers as well as those traveling by car to get to Vancouver Island and the surrounding islands. It is located at the western end of the North Shore and is very close to park. Visitors from the islands can access the park through the BC Ferries services, as there are various ferries operating at various hours that take visitors from several islands to the mainland of British Columbia.
