= Bessborough Armoury =

Canadian Armed Forces armoury

Coordinates: 49.262109°N 123.151658°W

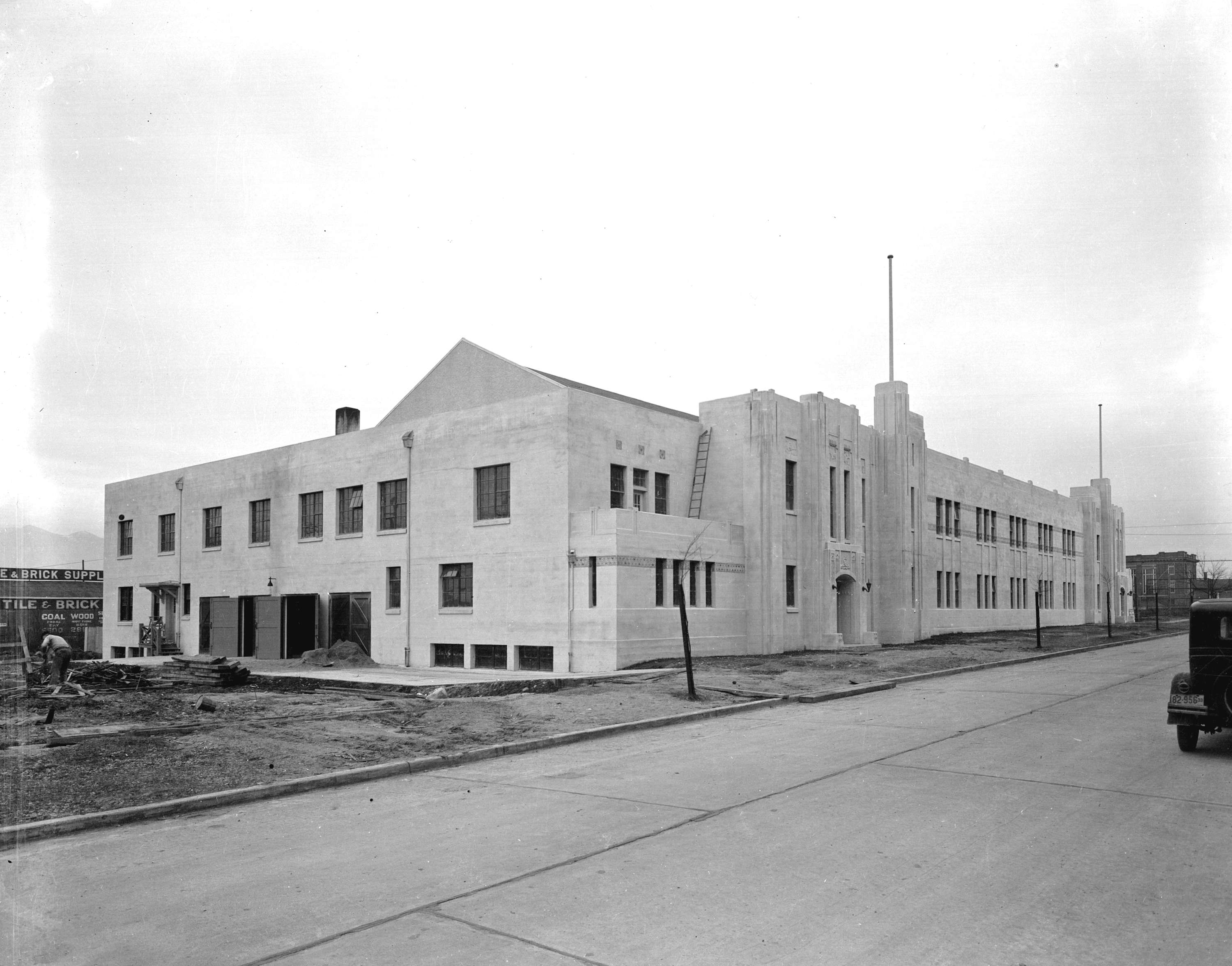
- Under construction, January 1933
- Interactive map of the Bessborough Armoury area

General information
- Type: Drill Hall / armoury
- Location: Vancouver, British Columbia Canada, 2025 West 11th Avenue
- Current tenants: 15th Field Artillery Regiment, RCA, 111 Pegasus Royal Canadian Air Cadet Squadron, 2472 15th Field Regiment, Royal Canadian Army Cadet Corps.
- Construction started: September 1932
- Completed: 1934
- Inaugurated: 27 March 1934
- Owner: Canadian Armed Forces

Design and construction
- Architect: Richard T. Perry
- Awards and prizes: Canada's Register of Historic Places

Renovating team
- Awards and prizes: Vancouver heritage building "B" Category; "Registered" Federal Heritage Building

Bessborough Armoury is a Canadian Armed Forces armoury located at 2025 West 11th Avenue in Vancouver, British Columbia.

== History ==
Construction of the armoury began in September 1932 and was completed in the following spring.

== Architecture ==
The architect was Richard T. Perry, who was also the Commanding Officer of the 15th Brigade. The outside of the building was done in an Art Deco style. Once the building was completed it initially provided accommodations for 15th Brigade and the British Columbia Hussars. The building was officially opened on 27 March 1934 by the Earl of Bessborough, the Governor General of Canada.

The building is listed on the Vancouver inventory of heritage buildings as a "B" Category and is classed as a "Registered" building by the Federal Heritage Buildings Review Office.

== Houses ==
In the Canadian Forces, an armoury is a place where a reserve unit trains, meets, and parades.

- 15th Field Artillery Regiment, RCA
- 2472 (15th Field Regiment, RCA) Royal Canadian Army Cadet Corps
- 111 (Pegasus), Royal Canadian Air Cadet Squadron

== See also ==
- List of Armouries in Canada

== Media ==
- Regimental History: 15th Field Artillery Regiment, Royal Regiment of Canadian Artillery
- Vancouver's Bessborough Armoury: A History by Robert V. Stevenson (Jan 2010)
