= I Corps Band =

United States Army military band

56th Army Band
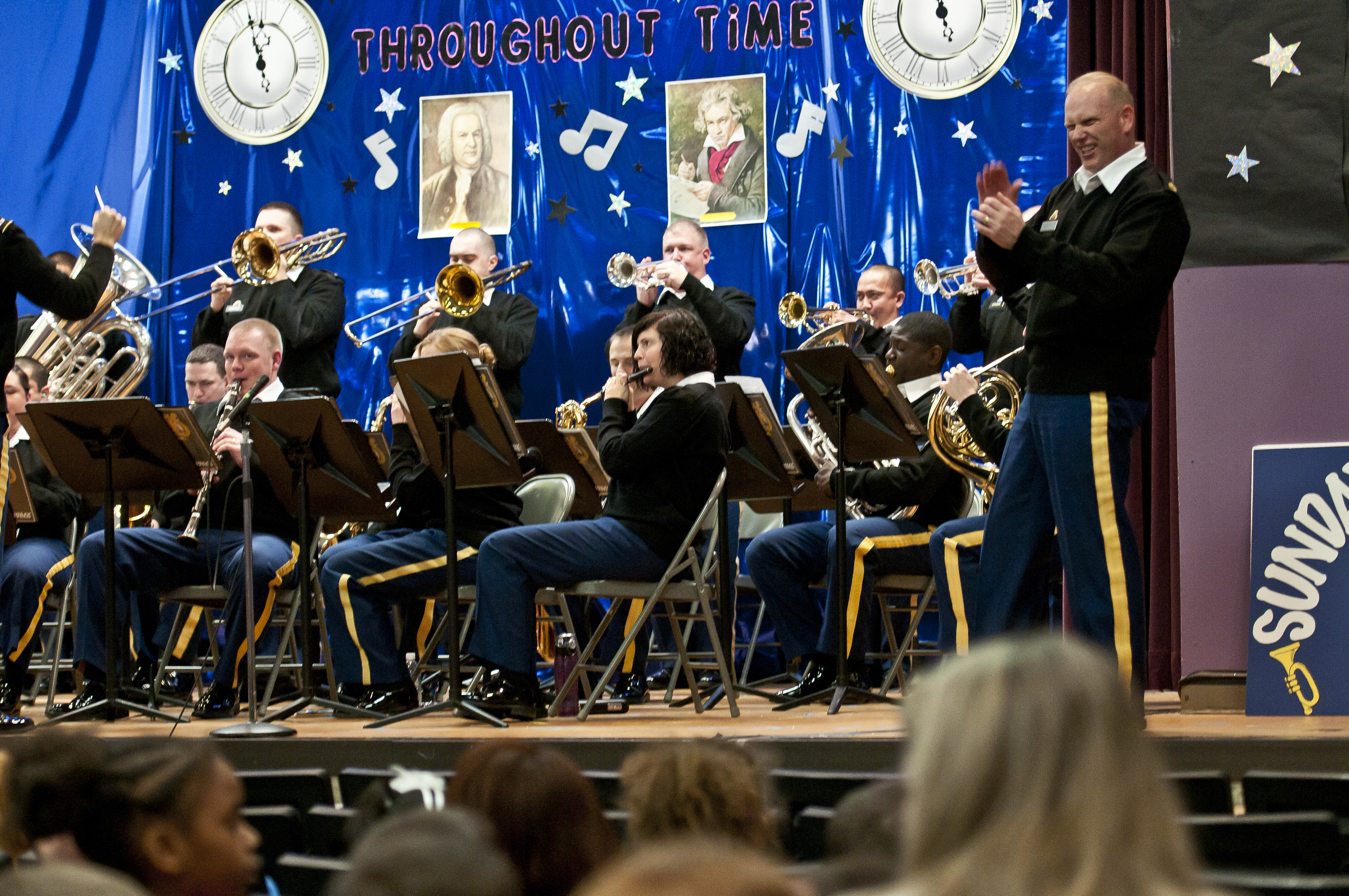
- The I Corps Band pictured in 2012 during a performance children at Evergreen Elementary School in Fort Lewis
- Active: 8 July 1991-Present
- Country: United States
- Branch: United States Army
- Type: Military band
- Role: Public duties
- Part of: I Corps
- HQ: Fort Lewis, Washington
- Nickname(s): Heartbeat of America's Corps; America's First Corps Band; Fightin' 56th
- Engagements: World War II; Korea War

Commanders
- Bandmaster and conductor: Chief Warrant Officer Robert Bruns

I Corps Band or America's First Corps Band (officially referred to as the 56th Army Band) is an American military band maintained by the United States Army and is attached to the Army's I Corps in United States Army Forces Command. It is currently one of two Army bands in the Pacific Northwest, the other being the 133d Army Band (Washington Army National Guard) based at Camp Murray. The 56th is currently based at Joint Base Lewis–McChord outside of Tacoma, Washington.

== Ensembles ==
These ensembles include:

- Brass Quintet
- Woodwind Quintet
- Jazz Combo
- Rock Band
- Brass Band
- Concert Band
- Ceremonial Band

== Performances ==
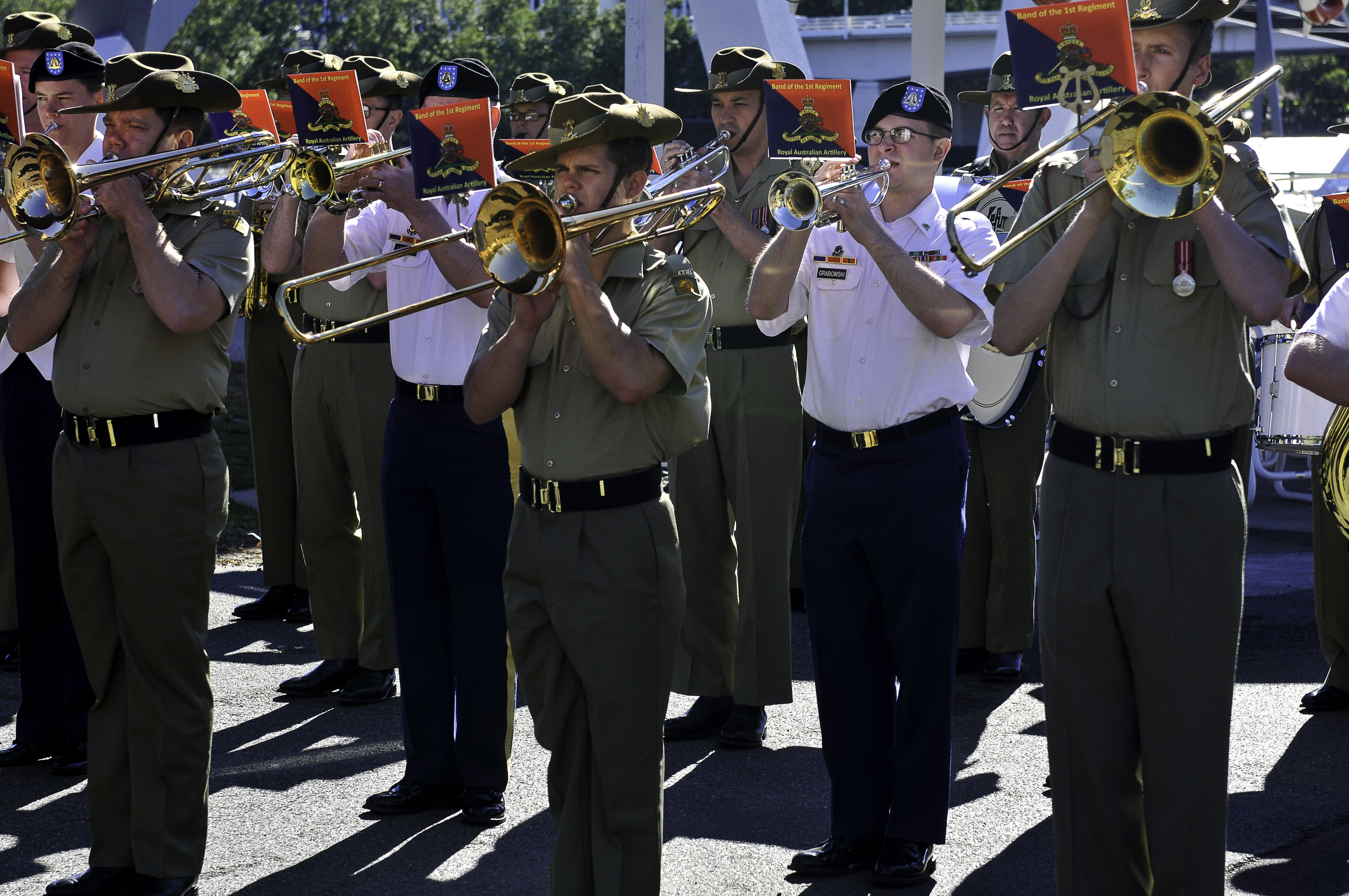
The band performing with the Band of the 1st Regiment, Royal Australian Artillery.

Outside ceremonial performances, the band also performs throughout the Tacoma community, which frequently include K-12 schools as well as community concerts and parades. A member of the band often performs at the regimental ball of the Military Police Corps in Tacoma, Washington. It also performs at the annual international band concert with the Naden Band of Maritime Forces Pacific and Navy Band Northwest at the Bremerton Performing Arts Center. Being a music entity, the jazz band of the I Corps Band has performed on multiple media networks such as KNKX, which is the National Public Radio's jazz-based radio format for the Seattle metropolitan area. In May 2014, during a concert by the band that was streamed live at a high school in Oswego, Illinois, the band held a Q&A with the local students who saw the band during an assembly. In the summer of 2016, it performed at a memorial service in Enoggera, Queensland, Australia as part of the Talisman Saber exercise.

== Lineage ==
The lineage of the band is as follows:

- Founded on 28 October 1938 in the Regular Army as the Band, 41st Engineer Regiment
- Activated on 18 November 1940 at Fort Bragg, North Carolina
- Redesignated on 1 August 1942 as the Band, 41st Engineer General Service Regiment
- Redesignated on 12 October 1943 as the Band, 9th Infantry Division in Sicily, Italy and activated 2 and a half weeks later
- Reorganized and redesignated on 24 July 1944 as the 419th Army Service Forces Band
- Redesignated on 11 June 1946 as the 419th Band
- Deactivated on 10 February 1947 at Fort Dix, New Jersey
- Redesignated on 17 May 1947 as the 419th Army Band
- Redesignated 22 January 1948 as the 56th Army Band
- Activated 15 March 1948 in Japan
- Deactivated 24 June 1958 in Japan
- Activated 1 November 1962 at Fort Chaffee, Arkansas
- Deactivated 24 March 1965 at Fort Chaffee, Arkansas
- Activated 20 July 1965 at Fort Polk, Louisiana
- Deactivated on 25 May 1970 at Fort Polk, Louisiana
- Reassigned on 8 July 1991 at Fort Lewis, Washington
- Activated 16 November 1994 at Fort Lewis, Washington

=== Unit honors and accolades ===
- Meritorious Unit Commendation (1968)
- Order of the Day of the Belgian Army
- Gallantry Cross (South Vietnam) (1969)
- Civil Actions Medal 1st Class
- Army Commendation Medal

== See also ==
- Signal Corps Band
- U.S. Army Band
