= 5th Dragoons =

5th Dragoons or 5th Dragoon Regiment may refer to the following military units:

- 5th Dragoon Regiment (France), French Army unit
- 5th Royal Irish Lancers, British Army unit active 1858–1922 or its predecessor the 5th Dragoons active 1751–1799
- 5th Dragoon Guards, British Army unit active 1788–1922
- 5th Royal Inniskilling Dragoon Guards, British Army unit active 1922–1993
- 5th Dragoons (Canada), Canadian Militia unit active 1856 - 1901 when it was amalgamated into the 6th Duke of Connaught's Royal Canadian Hussars.

== See also ==
- Princess Louise Dragoon Guards, Canadian Militia unit active 1872-1936, previously known as the 5th Princess Louise Dragoon Guards (1903-1920)
