= Death of Daniel Gunther =

Canadian soldier killed in Bosnia (1969–1993)

Daniel Gunther
- Born: January 13, 1969; Soest, West Germany
- Died: June 18, 1993 (aged 24); Buci, Bosnia †
- Burial place: Parc Commeratif La Souvenance; Quebec, Canada
- Spouse: Marie-Josée Vincent
- Children: 1
- Military career
- Allegiance: Canada
- Service years: 1987–1993
- Rank: Corporal
- Unit: Royal 22^{e} Régiment
- Conflicts: United Nations Protection Force Yugoslavia (UNPROFOR)

Corporal Daniel Gunther (January 13, 1969 – June 18, 1993) was a Canadian soldier serving with the Royal 22^{e} Régiment as part of the UN Protection Force in Bosnia.

His death while on the UN mission in Bosnia led to multiple discussions both in Canada and abroad:

- caused concern about a ceasefire between Croatian and Bosnian forces
- contributed to a series of debates by parliamentarians and Kim Campbell, Canada's minister of national defence and (eventually successful) candidate for prime minister, about the country's involvement in increasingly violent peacekeeping missions
- and was the source of a controversy about the lack of public transparency by the Canadian Forces.

Gunther was the third Canadian fatality in the Yugoslavia peacekeeping mission, and also the only Canadian soldier killed by hostile fire for the decade between 1993 and 2004 when Corporal Jamie Murphy was killed in Afghanistan in 2004.

== Context ==
1993 was a dark year for Canadian Forces. The public image of Canada's armed forces took a "severe beating" in 1993. Canadian soldiers committed abusive behaviour, including racism, torture and murder in Somalia in March 1993 (two months prior to Gunther's killing in Bosnia). The Canadian political issue known as the Somalia Affair eventually lead the Jean Chrétien government to call a public inquiry in 1994. The resulting investigation affected all levels of the Department of National Defence. The public also responded to surveys released in 1993 also showed that soldiers were resistant to openly homosexual soldiers and that 26.5 per cent of female personnel reported sexual harassment.

The scandals contributed to increased debate about Canada's management of its armed forces, public accountability and participation in active war zones such as Bosnia. A parliamentary committee examined and wrote a report on the issue of peacekeeping missions in increasingly dangerous conflicts.

Canada's role and management of peacekeeping units was an active topic for defence minister Kim Campbell who was competing to replace Prime Minister Brian Mulroney. Gunther's death occurred two days after Mulroney's last appearance in the House of Commons and seven days prior to Campbell's first day as Prime Minister.

Media relations was a challenge for the Canadian Forces in this decade due to a number of military scandals, the growing complexity of their missions, and the newer model of in-the-field broadcast journalism (sometimes referred to as the CNN Era) that required more media relations on the ground and could have a rapid impact on news and politics in the home country.

Critics of the military believed the Department of National Defence and Canadian Forces attempted to minimize the negative impacts on public opinion in order to avoid being forced to scale back its participation in increasingly violent peacekeeping missions. Canadian historian, and former head of the Canadian War Museum, Jack Granatstein has cited Gunther's death as an example of a general policy by defense headquarters to limit publicizing details.

== June 18 death ==
About a month after being assigned to Bosnia, Gunther was driving a UN-marked M113 armored personnel carrier (APC) in Buci, a village with high tension between Muslims and Croats that was about 20 kilometres northwest of Sarajevo on June 18, 1993.

At 12:40, just 40 minutes after a ceasefire was supposed to start at noon, Gunther stood up to look out the front of his APC, with his captain and sergeant at the back. The sun was directly overhead as he surveyed the land through binoculars. He saw a line of tracer fire arcing across the sky and when he turned to call out his report, a shot sounded from a nearby building. An anti-tank rocket, most probably an 82-millimeter Recoilless rifle, burst through Daniel's chest, and his head was torn from his body.

== Ceasefire concerns ==
A ceasefire between the Serbian, Croatian and Muslim forces was agreed upon to start at noon on June 18. The killing of Gunther occurred 40 minutes after the ceasefire began. The Bosnian army claimed he was killed by a Serb mortar round. The United Nations would not comment on the details of the killing or which side was responsible, which led to questions whether they were limiting public comments in order to avoid disrupting negotiations between the parties.

Canadian officials also did not identify which group was responsible for the killing. Eventually, the rocket was attributed to Muslim militiamen.

== Cover-up controversy ==
The manner of his killing was inaccurately reported by the military to the public and Gunther's family which eventually caused a controversy in Canada.

Immediately following his death, an incident report stating that he was the victim of a "deliberate attack by an anti-tank rocket" was sent to the National Defense Headquarters in Ottawa. The report was received within six hours of the incident and was in a daily briefing package for the deputy minister. The military's initial position was that Gunther was likely killed unintentionally by shrapnel from a distant mortar and that, as a new peacekeeper, he may have exposed himself by being outside the protection of his vehicle. The military's press release that evening read, "Corporal Daniel Gunther ... was killed today when a mortar bomb fell close to his vehicle." A public-affairs officer also added, "Corporal Gunther was probably halfway out of his vehicle when he was hit by shrapnel."

Because of the inaccurate publicity, some news publications were led to speculate whether the M113 APC was obsolete and unsafe for use in peacekeeping missions.

The conclusion of the incident report was justified by a unanimous, but classified, conclusions of an internal board of inquiry that were not made public until after it became a controversy. The official military account wasn't publicly challenged until December 1993, six months after the incident and two months after Kim Campbell's landslide election-loss. Two soldiers anonymously notified Scott Taylor, iconoclastic publisher of military watchdog magazine Esprit de Corps, that the military knew that Gunther's killing was intentional but continued to avoid correcting their initial position to both the public and even to Gunther's family. The soldiers stated that it was an anti-tank rocket that had killed Gunther, implying it had not been a simple misfortune, but a deliberately aimed warhead that killed the Corporal driving a marked UN Peacekeeping vehicle.

Taylor fed the tips to Peter Worthington of the Toronto Sun to bring the soldiers' accounts into the public eye.

The Ministry of National Defence attributed the error to initial information provided from the war zone.

Esprit de Corps subsequently published a number of critical articles about the issue in the magazine and in books co-authored by Taylor.

After the hostile nature of Gunther's killing became a controversy, some questioned whether Kim Campbell's campaign was a factor in downplaying the facts about his death. It was later demonstrated that she was not informed about the hostile nature of his death.

=== Family relations ===
Gunther belonged to a military family. His father Peter Gunther was a Captain (who eventually spent 37 years in the military) and his maternal grandfather retired as a Sergeant. Daniel Gunther was born in Germany while his father was assigned to a military base there. In 1987, the year after he and his parents moved back to Montreal in the suburb of Brossard, Daniel Gunther enlisted in the army.

In April 1993, Daniel was placed on standby for duty in Bosnia. In May, he was assigned to Bosnia selected as an emergency reinforcement to replace an injured soldier in Bosnia, leaving his wife Marie-Josée Vincent and his ten-month-old son Alexandre in Quebec.

In addition to the perceived lengthy cover-up of the real nature of Gunther's killing, some slights by the military contributed to Gunther's parents criticizing the military publicly. In a period of time when Internet usage was somewhat novel, the family created webpages to honour and advocate for their son's memory.

Since he had a one-year-old child, Gunther tried to amend his armed forces supplementary insurance policy from $100,000 to $250,000 prior to his departure to Bosnia. His unit, anxious to get him overseas immediately, told him he could do that once he got to Bosnia. He was killed days after he arrived and before he could make the necessary changes to his policy. The army commander, Lieutenant-General Baril, later admitted that Gunther had been given insufficient time to prepare for his tour but, without a signature, the policy stood at $100,000.

Memorial Cross

Instead of providing in person the Silver Cross, an award given to families of all service personnel killed overseas, the military sent it to Gunther's mother by mail and it was tarnished, not new. When Gunther's mother went to the following year's Remembrance Day ceremony in Quebec City to lay a bouquet of flowers in her son's honour, she was denied access until after the ceremony had ended.

Some years later, the military announced that Gunther's mother would be the Memorial Cross Mother who would lay flowers at the National Peacekeeping Monument during the Peacekeeping Day Ceremony on October 22, 2000. The Chief of the Defence Staff, General Maurice Baril, also presented the Canadian Peacekeeping Service Medal to his widow, son, father and grandfather.

Gunther was posthumously awarded the Dag Hammarskjöld Medal and was mentioned in Roméo Dallaire's award-winning novel Shake Hands with the Devil.

== Archives ==
Canadian Forces documents about circumstances surrounding his death are preserved in the National Defence Headquarters Directorate of History and Heritage.
