= Royal Canadian Hussars =

The Royal Canadian Hussars (Montreal)
- Badge of the Royal Canadian Hussars
- Active: Late 18th century–present
- Country: Canada
- Branch: Canadian Army
- Type: Light cavalry
- Role: Armoured reconnaissance
- Size: Approximately 200 members
- Part of: 34 Canadian Brigade Group
- Garrison/HQ: Montreal
- Nickname: RCH
- Mottos: Non nobis sed patriae (Latin for 'Not for ourselves, but for our country')
- March: "St. Patrick's Day" and "Men of Harlech"
- Engagements: War of 1812; Fenian Raids; Second Boer War; First World War; Second World War; War in Afghanistan
- Battle honours: Defence of Canada – 1812–1815 – Défense du Canada; South Africa, 1900; Mount Sorrel; Somme, 1916, '18; Flers–Courcelette; Thiepval; Arras, 1917, '18; Vimy, 1917; Hill 70; Ypres, 1917; Passchendaele; Bapaume, 1918; Rosières; Avre; Amiens; Scarpe, 1918; Drocourt–Quéant; Hindenburg Line; Canal du Nord; Cambrai, 1918; Valenciennes; Sambre; France and Flanders 1915–18; Caen; Falaise; The Laison; The Scheldt; Breskens Pocket; The Rhineland; The Rhine; Emmerich–Hoch Elten; Zutphen; Deventer; North-West Europe 1944–1945; Afghanistan
- Website: rch.ca/en/

Commanders
- Current commander: LCol Steve Lessard, CD
- Colonel-in-Chief: The Princess Royal

Insignia
- NATO Map Symbol

The Royal Canadian Hussars (Montreal) (abbreviated as RCH) is an armoured reconnaissance regiment of the Primary Reserve in the Canadian Armed Forces. It is one of the oldest cavalry regiments in North America, tracing a direct history to the Montreal Volunteer Cavalry formed in the late eighteenth century. Its Colonel-in-Chief is Her Royal Highness, the Princess Royal, and its allied regiment is the Queen's Royal Hussars. Its mission consists of supporting the Regular Force in operational deployments, peacetime tasks, and supporting the civilian authorities.

== Lineage ==
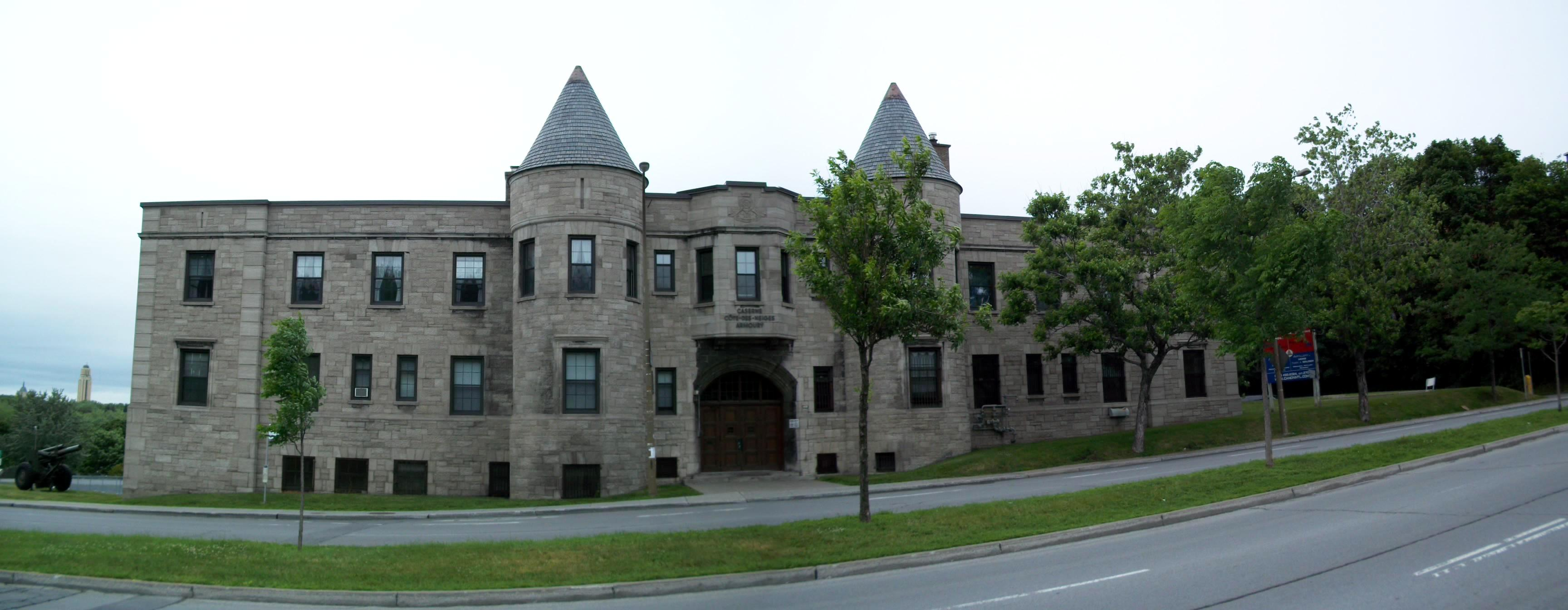
Armoury of The Royal Canadian Hussars It is also home to the 2nd Field Regiment, Royal Canadian Artillery

The Royal Canadian Hussars (Montreal) derives from the Montreal Volunteer Cavalry (formed in the late eighteenth century). The present regiment perpetuates five cavalry units and one armoured unit: the Royal Montreal Cavalry, the 5th Dragoons, the 6th Duke of Connaught's Royal Canadian Hussars (6th DCRCH), the 11th Argenteuil Rangers, the 17th Duke of York's Royal Canadian Hussars (17th DYRCH), and the 1st Motor Machine Gun Brigade.

=== The Royal Canadian Hussars (Montreal) ===
- Originated on 14 November, 1879, in Montréal, Quebec, as the 6th Provisional Regiment of Cavalry.
- Redesignated on 18 September, 1885, as the 6th Regiment of Cavalry.
- Redesignated on 20 June, 1890, as the 6th Regiment of Cavalry “Duke of Connaught's Royal Canadian Hussars”.
- Redesignated on 1 January, 1893, as the 6th “Duke of Connaught's Royal Canadian Hussars”.
- Amalgamated on 1 June, 1901, with the 5th Dragoons and redesignated as the 6th Duke of Connaught's Royal Canadian Hussars.
- Amalgamated on 15 December, 1936, with the 1st Armoured Car Regiment and redesignated as the 6th Duke of Connaught's Royal Canadian Hussars (Armoured Car).
- Redesignated on 27 February, 1941, as the 2nd (Reserve) Regiment, 6th Duke of Connaught's Royal Canadian Hussars (Armoured Car).
- Redesignated on 1 April, 1941, as the 15th (Reserve) Armoured Regiment, (6th Duke of Connaught's Royal Canadian Hussars).
- Redesignated on 4 February, 1949, as the 6th Duke of Connaught's Royal Canadian Hussars (15th Armoured Regiment).
- Redesignated on 19 May, 1958, as the 6th Duke of Connaught's Royal Canadian Hussars.
- Amalgamated on 16 September, 1958, with the 17th Duke of York's Royal Canadian Hussars and redesignated as The Royal Canadian Hussars (Montreal).

=== 5th Dragoons ===
- Originated on 30 November 1877, in Cookshire, Quebec, as the 5th Provisional Regiment of Cavalry.
- Redesignated on 21 May 1886, as the 5th Regiment of Cavalry.
- Redesignated on 1 January 1893, as the 5th Dragoons.
- Amalgamated on 1 June 1901, with the 6th "Duke of Connaught's Royal Canadian Hussars" and redesignated as the 6th Duke of Connaught's Royal Canadian Hussars.

=== 1st Armoured Car Regiment ===
- Originated on 1 June, 1919, in Montréal, Quebec, as the 1st Motor Machine Gun Brigade, CMGC.
- Redesignated on 1 October, 1936, as the 1st Armoured Car Regiment.
- Amalgamated on 15 December, 1936, with the 6th Duke of Connaught's Royal Canadian Hussars and redesignated as the 6th Duke of Connaught's Royal Canadian Hussars (Armoured Car).

=== 17th Duke of York's Royal Canadian Hussars ===
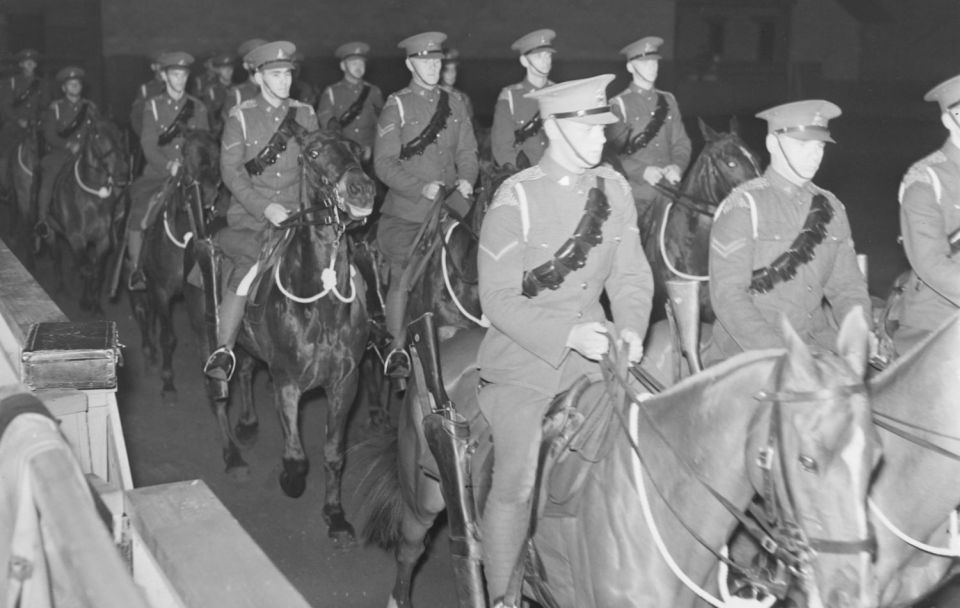
17th Hussars in 1940

- Originated on 1 March 1907, in Montréal, Quebec, as The 17th Duke of York's Royal Canadian Hussars.
- Redesignated on 15 July 1912, as The 17th Duke of York's Royal Canadian Hussars "Argenteuil Rangers".
- Redesignated on 15 March 1920, as the 17th Duke of York's Royal Canadian Hussars.
- Redesignated on 11 February 1941, as the 2nd (Reserve) Regiment, 17th Duke of York's Royal Canadian Hussars.
- Redesignated on 1 April 1941, as the 7th (Reserve) Reconnaissance Battalion, (17th Duke of York's Royal Canadian Hussars).
- Redesignated on 8 June 1942, as the 7th (Reserve) Reconnaissance Regiment (17th Duke of York's Royal Canadian Hussars), CAC.
- Redesignated on 2 August 1945, as the 7th (Reserve) Reconnaissance Regiment (17th Duke of York's Royal Canadian Hussars), RCAC.
- Redesignated on 4 February 1949, as the 17th Duke of York's Royal Canadian Hussars (7th Reconnaissance Regiment).
- Redesignated on 19 May 1958, as the 17th Duke of York's Royal Canadian Hussars.
- Amalgamated on 16 September 1958, with the 6th Duke of Connaught's Royal Canadian Hussars and redesignated as The Royal Canadian Hussars (Montreal).

=== 11th Regiment Argenteuil Rangers ===
- Originated on 14 June 1862, in Gore, Quebec, as the 11th Battalion Volunteer Militia Infantry of Canada or Argenteuil Rangers.
- Later redesignated in the same year as the 11th Battalion of Infantry Argenteuil Rangers.
- Redesignated on 8 May, 1900, as the 11th Regiment Argenteuil Rangers.
- Disbanded on 15 April, 1912, and personnel absorbed by The 17th Duke of York's Royal Canadian Hussars and redesignated as The 17th Duke of York's Royal Canadian Hussars "Argenteuil Rangers".

=== Lineage chart ===
Lineage chart

1812
1815
1855
1856
1877
1879
1885
1886
1890
1893
1897
1898
1901
1907
1912
1914
1915
1919
1920
1926
1936
1936
1940
1941
1941
1942
1943
1945
1945
1946
1949
1958
1958
2012

Canadian Light Dragoons	Coy of Guides	Royal Montreal Tp of Volunteer Cavy
Disbanded	Disbanded	Disbanded
Independent troops of cavy	1st Volunteer Militia Tp of Cavy of Montreal
Independent troops of cavy
5th Provisional Regt of Cavy
6th Provisional Regt of Cavy	No. 1 Tp, (Note: Later "A" Squadron) 6th Provisional Regt of Cavy
6th Regt of Cavy
5th Regt of Cavy
6th Regt of Cavy "Duke of Connaught's Royal Canadian Hussars"
5th Dragoons	6th "Duke of Connaught's Royal Canadian Hussars"
6th Duke of Connaught's Royal Canadian Hussars
Automobile MG Bde, No. 1, CEF
1st Canadian Motor MG Bde, CEF
1st Motor MG Bde, CMGC
1st Regt, 6th Duke of Connaught's Royal Canadian Hussars	Disbanded
Perpetuates 1st Canadian Motor MG Bde
1st Armd Car Regt
6th Duke of Connaught's Royal Canadian Hussars (Armd Car)
3rd Canadian Motorcycle Regt, CASF (17 H)
5th Canadian (Armd) Div. HQ Sqn (6th Duke of Connaught's Royal Canadian Hussars), CAC, CASF	2nd (Reserve) Regt, 6th Duke of Connaught's Royal Canadian Hussars (Armd Car)	17th (Active) Duke of York's Royal Canadian Hussars, CASF
15th (Reserve) Armd Regt (6th Duke of Connaught's Royal Canadian Hussars)	7th Recce Bn (17th Duke of York's Royal Canadian Hussars), CAC, CASF
7th Recce Regt (17th Duke of York's Royal Canadian Hussars), CAC, CASF
Disbanded
2nd 7th Recce Regt, CAC, CAOF
2nd 7th Recce Regt, RCAC, CAOF
Disbanded	Disbanded
6th Duke of Connaught's Royal Canadian Hussars (15th Armd Regt)
6th Duke of Connaught's Royal Canadian Hussars
The Royal Canadian Hussars (Montreal)
Perpetuates War of 1812 units

Argenteuil and Vaudreuil Divisions
Disbanded
Montreal Hussars (Note: Squadron)
The Duke of York's Royal Canadian Hussars
The 17th Duke of York's Royal Canadian Hussars (Note: Regiment)
The 17th Duke of York's Royal Canadian Hussars "Argenteuil Rangers"
1st Regt, 17th Duke of York's Royal Canadian Hussars
17th Duke of York's Royal Canadian Hussars (Note: Perpetuates No. 1 Troop, Montreal Cavalry)
2nd (Reserve) Regt, 17th Duke of York's Royal Canadian Hussars
7th (Reserve) Recce Bn (17th Duke of York's Royal Canadian Hussars)
7th (Reserve) Recce Regt (17th Duke of York's Royal Canadian Hussars), CAC
7th (Reserve) Recce Regt (17th Duke of York's Royal Canadian Hussars), RCAC
17th Duke of York's Royal Canadian Hussars (7th Recce Regt)
17th Duke of York's Royal Canadian Hussars

== Perpetuations ==
=== War of 1812 ===
- Canadian Light Dragoons
- Company of Guides
- Royal Montreal Troop of Volunteer Cavalry
- Argenteuil and Vaudreuil Divisions (1812-15)

=== Pre-Confederation ===
- No. 1 Troop, Montreal Cavalry (1855)

=== Great War ===
- 1st Canadian Motor Machine Gun Brigade, CEF

== History ==
Since the amalgamation, the regiment itself has not been involved in any hostilities but has constantly provided individuals to augment the Regular Force in both NATO and United Nations peacekeeping duties as well as domestic operations such as Operation Recuperation during the Ice Storm of 1998.

The regiment received its second guidon on December 3, 1974, the 100th anniversary of regimental status and its 135th year as a Canadian cavalry unit.

From 1986 to 1990, the regiment won the Royal Canadian Armoured Corps Buchanan Trophy (the best armour unit in the Eastern and Atlantic Areas) a total of five times and the Worthington Trophy (the best armour unit in Canada) a total of three times.

In August 1990, the regiment commanded and formed the headquarters and one complete squadron for the first-of-its-kind Militia brigade-level exercise. Exercise En Guard was held at Canadian Forces Base Gagetown and included the four armoured units of Secteur de l'Est (RBSE). Shortly afterwards, in September 1990, the regiment sent a 21-man contingent to Cyprus augmenting the 12^{e} Régiment blindé du Canada on its United Nations peacekeeping tour of duty.

Since 1990 the regiment has deployed troops on UN missions in both Haiti and Bosnia, as well as providing personnel during the Oka crisis and the ice storm of 1998. The unit has also continued to participate in the Noble Lion exercises as part of Land Force Quebec Area. On April 1, 1997, The Royal Canadian Hussars (Montreal) became the establishment armoured regiment (tank) for the newly formed 34th Canadian Brigade Group (34 CBG). E organization falls under the command of 34 CBG.

In late 2003, the mission of the RCH was changed to fit the restructuring plan of the Canadian Forces Land Force Command. The troops were converted back to a role of armoured reconnaissance. The regiment comprises two squadrons: B Squadron (combat troops) and C&S Squadron (command and support). On May 1, 2005, the RCH received its third guidon.

In 2007 seven members of the RCH were deployed to Afghanistan as part of Joint Task Force Afghanistan (JTF AFG) Rotation 4, which included approximately 2330 Canadian Forces members from the Quebec region.

From November 2010 to July 2011, six members of the RCH were again deployed in the Kandahar region of Afghanistan as part of the Joint Task Force Afghanistan Rotation 10.

== Alliances ==
- United Kingdom - The Queen's Royal Hussars
- United Kingdom - The Light Dragoons

== Battle Honours ==
=== War of 1812 ===
- Defence of Canada – 1812–1815 – Défense du Canada
- The non-emblazonable honorary distinction Defence of Canada – 1812–1815 – Défense du Canada

=== South African War ===
- South Africa, 1900

=== First World War ===
- Mount Sorrel
- Somme, 1916, '18
- Flers–Courcelette
- Thiepval
- Arras, 1917, '18
- Vimy, 1917
- Hill 70
- Ypres, 1917
- Passchendaele
- Bapaume, 1918
- Rosières
- Avre
- Amiens
- Scarpe, 1918
- Drocourt–Quéant
- Hindenburg Line
- Canal du Nord
- Cambrai, 1918
- Valenciennes
- Sambre
- France and Flanders 1915–18

=== Second World War ===
- Italy, 1944–45
- Caen
- Falaise
- The Laison
- The Scheldt
- Breskens Pocket
- The Rhineland
- The Rhine
- Emmerich–Hoch Elten
- Zutphen
- Deventer
- North-West Europe 1944–1945

=== War in Afghanistan ===
- Afghanistan

== Notable members ==
- James Angus Ogilvy, retail store magnate. Donor of the Ogilvy sword, a trophy given yearly to the officer of the year.
- James Ross (Canadian businessman), notable for his role in the completion of the Canadian Pacific Railway; appointed Honorary Lieutenant-Colonel of the 17th Duke of York's Royal Canadian Hussars in 1900; was also a governor of McGill University and president of the Montreal Museum of Fine Arts.
- Ben Weider, OC CQ CD businessman, bodybuilder and Napoleonic historian.
- LGen ELM "Tommy" Burns, CC DSO OBE MC CD served in the regiment. He was Canada's military representative at the UN on disarmament for many years.
- Lieutenant-Colonel (Retd) Roman Jarymowycz, O.M.M., C.D., Dean and Director of the Militia Command and Staff Course, serving as an instructor for 15 years.
- Eric Barry

== See also ==
- The Canadian Crown and the Canadian Forces
- List of Armouries in Canada

== Order of precedence ==
Preceded by The Prince Edward Island Regiment (RCAC)	The Royal Canadian Hussars (Montreal)	Succeeded by The British Columbia Regiment (Duke of Connaught's Own)
