= 4th Princess Louise Dragoon Guards =

- Regimental badge
- Active: 1875–1965
- Country: Canada
- Branch: Canadian Militia (1875–1940); Canadian Army (1940–1965)
- Type: Dragoon Guards
- Role: Cavalry, reconnaissance
- Size: One Regiment
- Part of: Non-Permanent Active Militia (1875–1940); Royal Canadian Armoured Corps (1940–1965)
- Headquarters: Ottawa, Ontario
- Patron: Princess Louise, Duchess of Argyll
- Mottos: Pro aris et focis (Latin for 'for our altars and for our homes')
- Colors: Blue tunics with white facings
- March: Quick: "Men of Harlech"; Slow: "God Bless the Prince of Wales"
- Engagements: South African War; First World War; Second World War
- Battle honours: South Africa, 1900; Mount Sorrel; Adrano; Troina Valley; Sicily, 1943; Landing at Reggio; Motta Montecorvino; Liri Valley; Hitler Line; Melfa Crossing; Gothic Line; Tomba di Pesaro; Casale; Sant' Angelo in Salute; Capture of Ravenna; Naviglio Canal; Italy, 1943–45; North-West Europe, 1945

Commanders
- Notable commanders: Harry Wickwire Foster

The 4th Princess Louise Dragoon Guards is an inactive armoured regiment of the Canadian Militia / Canadian Army. It is currently on the Supplementary Order of Battle.

== Lineage ==
Several independent troops of cavalry in the Province of Canada's volunteer militia were formed in the Kingston area starting in 1855. Four of these troops (in Kingston, Napanee, Loughborough and Picton) were united under a regimental headquarters in 1875, becoming the "4th Provisional Regiment of Cavalry". This regiment adopted hussar uniforms (with buff facings) and hussar customs in 1893, being redesignated as the "4th Hussars". In 1932, they were again redesignated as the "4th Hussars of Canada".

Meanwhile, in Ottawa, the city's independent cavalry troop (formed in 1872) came under the patronage of the Princess Louise, Marchioness of Lorne, during her time there as vice-regal consort (1878–1880), and the troop was expanded to an independent squadron named the "Princess Louise Dragoon Guards". During the Second Boer War, volunteers from the squadron fought with the Imperial forces in South Africa. The squadron was again expanded into a regiment in 1903 as the 5th "Princess Louise Dragoon Guards".

The 4th Hussars and the 5th PLDG were not mobilized in the First World War, but they both contributed volunteers to and aided in the recruiting of the 8th Regiment, Canadian Mounted Rifles. The 8th CMR did not enter combat as a unit, its personnel being absorbed by the reserves in England and the 4th Battalion, Canadian Mounted Rifles, in France, but enough of its former members fought at the Battle of Mount Sorrel that the regiment qualified for a battle honour, which the PLDG perpetuates.

In the 1936 reorganization of the Militia, the PLDG and the 4th Hussars were amalgamated as the "4th Princess Louise Dragoon Guards".

=== 4th Princess Louise Dragoon Guards ===
- Originated on 1 January 1903 in Ottawa, Ontario, as the "Princess Louise Dragoon Guards".
- Redesignated on 1 February 1903 as the "5th Princess Louise Dragoon Guards".
- Redesignated on 15 March 1920 as "The Princess Louise Dragoon Guards".
- Amalgamated on 15 December 1936 with the 4th Hussars of Canada and redesignated as the "4th Princess Louise Dragoon Guards".
- Redesignated on 11 February 1941 as the "2nd (Reserve) Regiment, 4th Princess Louise Dragoon Guards".
- Redesignated on 1 April 1941 as the "4th (Reserve) Reconnaissance Battalion, (4th Princess Louise Dragoon Guards)".
- Redesignated on 8 June 1942 as the "4th (Reserve) Reconnaissance Regiment (4th Princess Louise Dragoon Guards), CAC".
- Redesignated on 2 August 1945 as the "4th (Reserve) Reconnaissance Regiment (4th Princess Louise Dragoon Guards), RCAC".
- Redesignated on 19 June 1947 as the "4th Armoured Car Regiment (4th Princess Louise Dragoon Guards), RCAC".
- Redesignated on 4 February 1949 as the "4th Princess Louise Dragoon Guards (4th Armoured Car Regiment)".
- Redesignated on 19 May 1958 as the "4th Princess Louise Dragoon Guards".
- Reduced to nil strength on 12 February 1965, and transferred to the Supplementary Order of Battle.

=== 4th Hussars of Canada ===
- Originated on 30 April 1875 in Kingston, Ontario, as the "4th Provisional Regiment of Cavalry".
- Redesignated on 7 May 1886 as the "4th Regiment of Cavalry".
- Redesignated on 1 January 1893 as the "4th Hussars".
- Redesignated on 1 March 1932 as the "4th Hussars of Canada".
- Amalgamated on 15 December 1936 with the Princess Louise Dragoon Guards and redesignated as the "4th Princess Louise Dragoon Guards".

=== Lineage chart ===
Lineage chart

1855	Independent troops of cavy
1872	Ottawa Tp of Cavy
1875	4th Provisional Regt of Cavy
1879	Princess Louise Dragoon Guards (Note: Independent squadron)
1886	4th Regt of Cavy
1893	4th Hussars
1903	5th "Princess Louise Dragoon Guards" (Note: Regiment)
1915	8th Regt, CMR, CEF
1917	Disbanded
1920	1st Regt, 4th Hussars	2nd Regt, (Note: Reserve) 4th Hussars	1st Regt, The Princess Louise Dragoon Guards	2nd Regt, The Princess Louise Dragoon Guards
1926	1st Regt (8th Regt CMR, CEF), The Princess Louise Dragoon Guards
1932	1st Regt, 4th Hussars of Canada	2nd Regt, 4th Hussars of Canada
1936	Disbanded	Disbanded
1936	4th Princess Louise Dragoon Guards
1941	4th (Active) Princess Louise Dragoon Guards, CASF	2nd (Reserve) Regt, 4th Princess Louise Dragoon Guards
1941	4th Recce Bn (4th Princess Louise Dragoon Guards), CASF	4th (Reserve) Recce Bn (4th Princess Louise Dragoon Guards)
1942	4th Recce Regt (4th Princess Louise Dragoon Guards), CAC, CASF	4th (Reserve) Recce Regt (4th Princess Louise Dragoon Guards), CAC
1944	4th Princess Louise Dragoon Guards, CIC, CASF
1945	4th Recce Regt (4th Princess Louise Dragoon Guards), CAC, CASF
1945	4th Recce Regt (4th Princess Louise Dragoon Guards), RCAC, CASF	4th (Reserve) Recce Regt (4th Princess Louise Dragoon Guards), RCAC
1945	Disbanded
1947	4th Armd Car Regt (4th Princess Louise Dragoon Guards), RCAC
1949	4th Princess Louise Dragoon Guards (4th Armd Car Regt)
1958	4th Princess Louise Dragoon Guards
1965	Supplementary Order of Battle

== Perpetuations ==
- 8th Regiment, Canadian Mounted Rifles

== History ==
=== Prewar ===
In 1936 the 4th Hussars of Canada and the Princess Louise Dragoon Guards were amalgamated to form the 4th Princess Louise Dragoon Guards.

=== Second World War ===
The 4th Princess Louise Dragoon Guards was a Militia regiment activated for wartime service with the Canadian Army (Active) in 1941. It was assigned to the Canadian Armoured Corps, which itself had been activated in 1940. In 1942 it was redesignated the 4th Reconnaissance Regiment (4th Princess Louise Dragoon Guards), the same year the first of its soldiers sailed for the United Kingdom where 4th PLDG joined 1st Canadian Infantry Division at Camp Aldershot.

4th Recce immediately began expanding its ranks, taking volunteers from infantry regiments serving in the United Kingdom and a steady flow of reinforcements from Canada. Four squadrons were eventually raised in addition to the Regimental HQ Squadron. A reserve squadron, based in Ottawa, continued to provide reinforcements throughout the war as well.

"A" Squadron of 4th PLDG landed in Sicily on July 13, 1943, as part of the Follow-Up Forces. Only "A" Squadron, commanded by Major Arthur Duck, actually took part in the Sicily fighting. B and C Squadrons were not fully equipped with the requisite number of Otter light, and Fox heavy reconnaissance cars and Universal Carriers until October, when the regiment was serving on the Italian mainland. D Squadron was raised that winter when heavy rains and freezing temperatures rendered the Princess Louise Dragoon Guards' vehicles all but useless and the personnel from the latter squadron patrolled their sector on horseback instead.

4th PLDG took part in virtually all of the major actions in the campaign, which lasted just 38 days. The regiment landed at Reggio di Calabria, on the Italian mainland, on September 3, 1943, on the heels of 3rd Canadian Infantry Brigade and immediately began providing 1st Canadian Infantry Division Headquarters with information with regard to the ground to the north including the condition of roads and bridges and the location and strength of enemy forces. Each of the squadrons was composed of three scout troops and assault troop, equipped with a combination of Otter light reconnaissance cars and Fox heavy reconnaissance cars. The Fox had a revolving turret fitted with a .50 calibre Browning machine gun as well as a Bren .303 calibre light machine gun. The Otter mounted a single Bren as did the Universal Carriers used to transport the scout and assault troops.

Frequently operating well ahead of the rest of 1st Canadian Infantry Division, the Princess Louise often contacted the enemy, without warning; the Officer Commanding, C Squadron, Major Harold Parker once told a reporter "We keep driving until the enemy shoots at us. Then we know he is there". Parker was doing just that when his armoured car was struck by a 75mm shell on the Torella-Duronia road. The major was killed, instantly and his crew badly wounded. During the advance on the Adolf Hitler Line, in May, 1944 Sergeant Hubert Ditner, a farmer from Petersburg, Ontario, awoke to find that he and his men were sharing a roadside ditch with soldiers from the 44th "Hoch und Deutschmeister" Division. Ditner, who spoke fluent German, managed to get all ten of them to surrender without firing a shot. In a letter to his younger brother, Simon, the NCO confessed that he "didn't know who was shaking more, Jerry or me."

One of the most notable engagements fought by 4th PLDG took place at Miglionico. Numbers 4 and 8 (Assault) Troops, under Lieutenant Don White, used a railway tunnel to infiltrate the rear area of positions held by Oberst Ludwig Heilmann's 3rd Fallschirmjäger Regiment and launch the attack that killed an estimated 50 paratroopers and destroyed several trucks, an armoured car and a large quantity of ammunition.

All three squadrons were active on the Italian mainland by the time the regiment was transferred to the Canadian Infantry Corps. The regiment was assigned to 12th Canadian Infantry Brigade of the recently arrived 5th Canadian Armoured Division on July 13, 1944. The decision was the result of Eighth Army commander General Bernard Montgomery's concern that the division lacked the sufficient number of infantry battalions to protect the division's tanks against attacks by enemy infantry armed with shoulder-fired anti-tank weapons and self-propelled guns. The regiment, having established a reputation for courage and tenacity while operating as scouts, soon distinguished itself in its new role. On September 1, 1944, 4th PLDG was ordered to take Monte Peloso also known as Point 253. The feature, part of the enemy's Gothic Line was targeted by the Royal Canadian Artillery for the better part of an hour before C Squadron began scaling its forward slope at 1310 Hours where the Princess Louise ran headlong into paratroopers from 3rd Fallschirmjäger Regiment, preparing to mount a counterattack on nearby Point 204. A bitter, close-quarters gun battle ensued prior to tanks from Lord Strathcona's Horse joining the fight; blasted from their strongholds, midway up the hill the German paratroopers were cut down by the waiting Princess Louise with rifles and Bren light machine guns and, by last light the position was in Canadian hands. It had come, at a cost, however – 35 men, killed in action and 94 wounded. The enemy dead are said to have been so numerous that a bulldozer was required to inter them in a mass grave at the base of the hill.

A message penned by Eighth Army's commander, General Oliver Leese, congratulated the Princess Louise for their victory, made that much more remarkable based on the unit's very brief training as infantry. On December 4, 1944, the Princess Louise were ordered to capture Ravenna, the site of a German Korps HQ. Forced to abandon their vehicles, east of Godo the intrepid scouts continued on foot to flank the town and force its surprised defenders, 114th Jager Division to withdraw. The achievement resulted in the BBC, in a rare departure from protocol lauding 4th PLDG by name in a broadcast, that night.

On a humorous note, members of the unit were once urged by General Guy Simonds (GOC 1st Canadian Infantry Division) to beat a U.S. Army unit into the Sicilian village of Enna and thus take credit for its capture. A mixed bag of NCOs and troopers mounted their armoured cars and headed for the town only to be halted by a demolished culvert. Not to be denied, the soldiers commandeered a mule and continued the race, arriving in the village just as troops from 1st Infantry Division did so. Though the weary Canadians were only too happy to clamber aboard one of the latter unit's jeeps and ride the rest of the way into town, the regimental history of the 4th Princess Louise Dragoon Guards maintains that Corporal Jackson was first to dismount in Enna's piazza thus earning the right to claim Enna's capture.

The regiment was returned to its reconnaissance role and Armoured Corps status on 15 March 1945 and finished the war in Rotterdam, the Netherlands, after being transferred to the theatre as part of Operation Goldflake. 4th PLDG fought in a number of costly engagements with the desperate Germans prior to their surrender and played an active role in disarming and incarcerating them following the cessation of hostilities.

=== Postwar ===
The 4th Princess Louise Dragoon Guards was moved to the Supplementary Order of Battle of the Canadian Army in 1965.

== Organization ==
=== 4th Princess Louise Dragoon Guards (15 December 1936) ===
- Regimental Headquarters (Ottawa, Ontario)
- A Squadron (Ottawa, Ontario)
- B Squadron (Ottawa, Ontario)
- C Squadron (Prescott, Ontario)

== Alliances ==
- United Kingdom – 4th Queen's Own Hussars (1936–1958)
- United Kingdom – The Queen's Royal Irish Hussars (1958–1965)
- United Kingdom – 10th Royal Hussars (Prince of Wales's Own) (1936–1965)

== Uniform and traditions ==
Since the 1870s, the Princess Louise Dragoon Guards wore a full-dress uniform similar to that of the Carabiniers (6th Dragoon Guards). This consisted of a dark blue dragoon tunic with white collar and cuffs, facings and piping, and dark blue trousers with white double stripes. The regimental headdress consisted of a brass cavalry helmet with a white horsehair plume. Their undress dark blue peaked cap had a scarlet band and piping, which was a unique distinction granted to this regiment.

Though transferred to the infantry in July 1944, 4th PLDG retained the black beret of the Canadian Armoured Corps and continued to refer to its sub-units as "squadrons" and "troops" instead of "companies" and "platoons", the traditional infantry designation. Its motto was pro aris et focis (Latin for 'for hearth and home').

== Battle honours ==
In the list below, battle honours in small capitals were awarded for participation in large operations and campaigns, while those in lowercase indicate honours granted for more specific battles. The battle honours in bold type are emblazoned on the regimental standard.

South African War

- **South Africa, 1900**

First World War

- **Mount Sorrel**

Second World War

- Adrano
- Troina Valley
- **Sicily, 1943**
- Landing at Reggio
- **Motta Montecorvino**
- **Liri Valley**
- **Hitler Line**
- Melfa Crossing
- **Gothic Line**
- **Tomba di Pesaro**
- Casale
- Sant'Angelo in Salute
- **Capture of Ravenna**
- **Naviglio Canal**
- **Italy, 1943–1945**
- **North-West Europe, 1945**

== Notable soldiers ==
- Herbie, the cartoon soldier in the Canadian Army's newspaper, The Maple Leaf, was the brainchild of Sergeant William Garnet "Bing" Coughlin of 4th PLDG.
- Major-General Harry Wickwire Foster, commander of both 4th Canadian Armoured Division (North West Europe) and 1st Canadian Infantry Division (Italy). In 1941, Lieutenant-Colonel Foster assumed command of 4th Reconnaissance Regiment (4th Princess Louise Dragoon Guards), the recently activated scout formation assigned to 1st Canadian Infantry Division in England.
- Major-General Clive Addy joined the regiment as a reserve trooper in the early 1960s.
- Trooper Lorne W. R. Mulloy served in the regiment in 1899 before joining the Royal Canadian Dragoons for service in South Africa, where he was awarded the Distinguished Conduct Medal.
