= 4th Hussars =

The 4th Hussars or 4th Hussar Regiment may refer to the following military units:

- 4th Queen's Own Hussars, a former British Army cavalry regiment: previously the 4th (Queen's Own) Regiment of Dragoons and the 4th (Queen's Own) Regiment of Light Dragoons
- 4th Hussars of Canada, a Canadian Army regiment active 1855-1936
- 4th Hussar Regiment (France)
- Saxe Hussar Regiment: previously the 4éme Régiment de Hussards (Saxe)
