= Esprit de Corps (magazine) =

Canadian magazine

- Volume 16, issue 8
- Editor/Publisher: Scott Taylor
- Categories: Military, news, history
- Frequency: Monthly
- Circulation: 30,000
- Founded: 1988
- Company: Esprit de Corps
- Country: Canada
- Based in: Ottawa, Ontario, Canada
- Language: English
- Website: www.espritdecorps.ca

Esprit de Corps is a Canadian military magazine operating out of Ottawa, Ontario, by publisher and former soldier Scott Taylor. The magazine reports on Canada and international military issues, politics, military history and current events. Esprit de Corps was originally designed to be an inflight magazine in 1988 for passengers on Canadian Forces aircraft. Each issue features "On Target", an article written by Scott Taylor about current events. The magazine features a letter to the editor section where readers may comment on earlier issues, as well as a "hit and miss" page of short articles on current events. The magazine also features sections on military history such as "The Fight for Canada" and Les Peate's "The Old Guard."

== History ==
Esprit de Corps was first created in 1988 by Scott Taylor and his wife Katherine Taylor. The idea for the magazine began during a flight from Canadian Forces Base Lahr (CFB) to Germany, when the couple noted that Canadian Air Force planes lacked any on-board entertainment system or reading material. Scott and Katherine Taylor submitted their proposal—which was eventually accepted—to create an inflight magazine for the Canadian Forces five passenger aircraft.

In the première issue of Esprit de Corps, Taylor explained the purpose of the publication: "By focusing on the past and present accomplishments of the Canadian Forces, it is our aim to contribute to the 'esprit de corps' that has made the Canadian military one of the finest professional armed forces in the world today." The content began as a bilingual seatback magazine, designed with many illustrations and small articles that provided entertainment and reading for the aircraft passengers.

Due to the collapse of the Soviet Union and the Canadian government's subsequent downsizing of its military expenditures, the Canadian Forces were experiencing budget cuts and changing the way in which their personnel would be transported. This affected Esprit de Corps, as Canadian Forces personnel would now be transported on flights chartered by Air Canada. Because of the loss of its Canadian Air Force distribution and the cost-cutting atmosphere of the military community, the Taylors decided to convert their magazine to a newsstand monthly. The new magazine would feature mainly current military news and Canadian military history. The magazine continued to retain its seat-back distribution with Air Canada military charters and Scott Taylor began to hire staff to help fill their new eighty-four page format.

In 1991, Esprit de Corps ran an article, in which Scott Taylor stated that, "With the appointment of Marcel Masse as Defence Minister and the subsequent announcement of pending base closures, personnel cutbacks and procurement delays, it would appear that the Canadian military is forever destined to win wars on foreign soil and lose battles on Parliament Hill." The issue also featured an exclusive interview with Vice-Admiral Charles Thomas, who that April had resigned as vice-chief of defence staff over policy differences with the government. Not long after publication of that issue of Esprit de Corps, Air Canada, which now handled the Canadian Forces' charter flights, informed the magazine that "due to concerns over editorial content" it would no longer be welcome on board, on orders from the Department of National Defence (DND). Esprit de Corps went to the media with the story of censorship and threatened to issue a press release detailing corruption involving the DND official magazine Canadian Defence Quarterly. The DND's decision was reversed and Esprit de Corps was reinstated on the flights.

In 1993, Esprit de Corps, with the help of Sun Media, reported on a DND report regarding the death of Cpl. Daniel Gunther during Operation Medak Pocket in the Croatian War of Independence. DND reported that Gunther had died of injuries received when a mortar shell landed near his APC. Esprit de Corps received contradictory information from two anonymous soldiers. After initially publishing this information in The Toronto Sun, it was then covered in Esprit de Corps in January 1994. In reaction the DND banned the magazine from the Canadian Forces flights permanently.

Taylor challenged the DND in his February 1994 letter from the publisher after the DND did not report on the capture and abuse, including mock executions, of 11 Canadian peacekeepers at the hands of drunken Serbian soldiers.

A July 1994 issue featured a three-page interview with Lieutenant-General Gordon Reay, commander of the army. The cover depicted Trooper Kyle Brown, who had been sentenced to five years in the death of Shidane Arone in Somalia alongside a headline of "Scapegoat". The magazine used the article to try and clear Brown's name.

In March 2005, Esprit de Corps changed its format to coincide with the changes occurring to Canada's military. The magazine was redesigned and revamped with a new logo, more colour, commentary and a higher page count. New regular features were added such as "Hits and Misses", "At Ease" and the humour and trivia section.

== Esprit de Corps Books publishing ==
Since the mid-1990s, Esprit de Corps' investigations of the Canadian military, both its history and its current challenges, have led to the publication of 14 books, with Canadian publishers and the in-house Esprit de Corps Books imprint. Some of these books have been translated into Serbian, Macedonian, and Japanese.

- Tested Mettle: Canada's Peacekeepers (1998)
- INAT: Images of Serbia and the Kosovo Conflict (2000)
- Diary of an Uncivil War: The Violent Aftermath of the Kosovo Conflict (2002)
- Spinning on the Axis of Evil: America's War against Iraq (2003)
- Among the 'Others': the Forgotten Turkmen of Iraq (2004)
- Unreconciled Differences: Turkey, Armenia and Azerbaijan (2010)
- Canada's Secret Commandos (2002)
- Battles without Borders: The Rise and Fall of New France (2005)
- Sacrifice and Suffering (2006)
- Shadow Wars (2003)
- Uneasy Neighbours: Conflicts that Defined Canada (2005)
- The War That Wasn't: Canadians in Korea (2005)
- From Baddeck to the Yalu (2005)
