= Dragoon Guards =

Historical division of the UK army

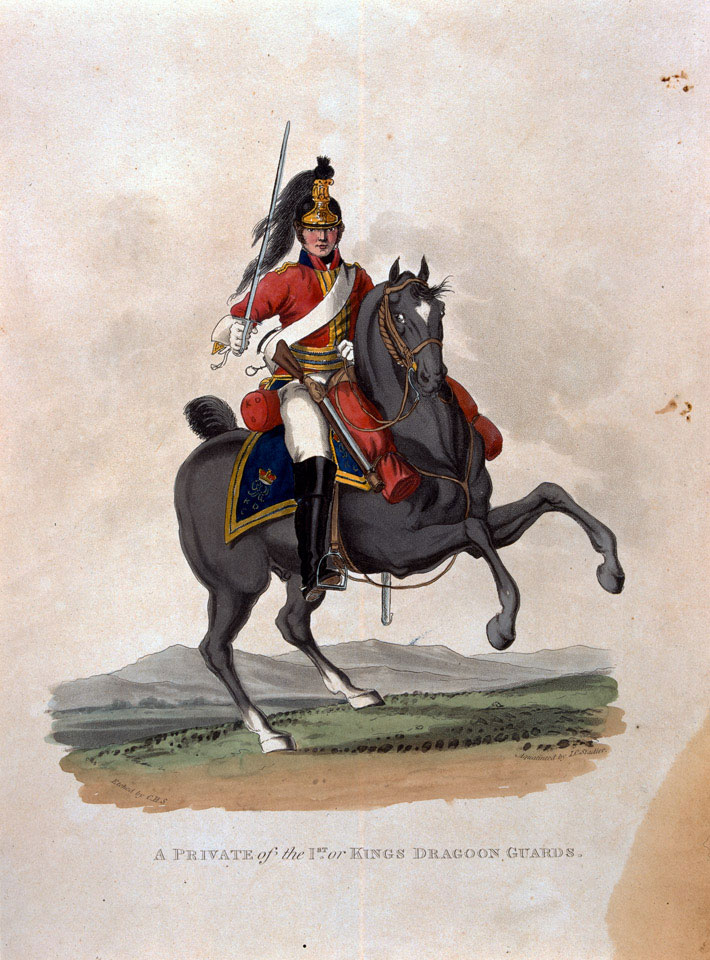
1812 engraving of a private of the 1st King's Dragoon Guards

Dragoon Guards is a designation that has been used to refer to certain heavy cavalry regiments in the British Army since the 18th century. While the Prussian and Russian armies of the same period included dragoon regiments among their respective Imperial Guards, different titles were applied to these units.

== Origins ==
The British Army first used the designation in 1746, when the King's Own Regiment of Horse, the Queen's Own Royal Regiment of Horse (prior to 1727 the Princess of Wales's Own) and the 4th Horse were redesignated as the 1st, 2nd and 3rd Dragoon Guards respectively. In 1788 the four remaining regiments of Horse were converted into the 4th to 7th Dragoon Guards. At the beginning of the French Revolutionary War the British Army maintained seven regiments of Dragoon Guards, plus six of Dragoons and fourteen of Light Dragoons. During the 19th and early 20th centuries the seven regiments of Dragoon Guards were classed as medium cavalry while the three remaining Dragoon regiments were heavy cavalry.

== Title ==
The exercise of converting from "Horse" (heavy cavalry) to "Dragoon" (formerly mounted infantry) was intended to save money—Dragoons were paid less than Horse and rode an inferior breed of horses. The change was accordingly very unpopular among the regiments affected. To compensate for the fall in salary and status, the impressive sounding title of "Dragoon Guards" was adopted. The Dragoon Guards remained as cavalry of the line and did not become Household troops in any sense.

== Seniority ==
The Regiments of Horse that were converted to Dragoon Guards took precedence over all other cavalry regiments of the Line, which were at the time exclusively dragoons. As the senior regiments, they could not take numbers sequential with those of the existing dragoon regiments, so they needed a new title and numbering system. Hence they were termed Dragoon Guards, the guards appellation giving them higher prestige, and allowing them to be numbered in their own sequence.

== British Dragoon Guards Regiments ==
- 1st King's Dragoon Guards (1746, from The King's Own Regiment of Horse); amalgamated to form 1st The Queen's Dragoon Guards (1959)
- 2nd Queen's Dragoon Guards (1746, from The Princess of Wales's Own Regiment of Horse); redesignated 2nd Dragoon Guards (Queen's Bays) (1872); redesignated The Queen's Bays (2nd Dragoon Guards) (1921); amalgamated to form 1st The Queen's Dragoon Guards (1959)
- 3rd Dragoon Guards (1747, from 4th Regiment of Horse); redesignated 3rd (Prince of Wales's) Dragoon Guards (1765); amalgamated to form 3rd/6th Dragoon Guards (1922); redesignated 3rd Carabiniers (Prince of Wales's Dragoon Guards) (1928); amalgamated with Royal Scots Greys (2nd Dragoons) to form Royal Scots Dragoon Guards (Carabiniers and Greys) (1971)
- 4th (Royal Irish) Dragoon Guards (1788, from 1st Irish Horse); redesignated 4th Royal Irish Dragoon Guards (1921); amalgamated to form 4th/7th Dragoon Guards (1922); redesignated 4th/7th Royal Dragoon Guards (1936); amalgamated to form Royal Dragoon Guards (1992)
- 5th Dragoon Guards (1788, from 2nd Irish Horse); redesignated 5th (Princess Charlotte of Wales's) Dragoon Guards (1804); redesignated 5th Dragoon Guards (Princess Charlotte of Wales's) (1920); amalgamated with The Inniskillings (6th Dragoons) to form 5th/6th Dragoons (1922); redesignated 5th Inniskilling Dragoon Guards (1927); redesignated 5th Royal Inniskilling Dragoon Guards (1935); amalgamated to form Royal Dragoon Guards (1992)
- 6th Dragoon Guards (The Carabiniers) (1788, from 3rd Irish Horse); redesignated The Carabiniers (6th Dragoon Guards) (1920); amalgamated to form 3rd/6th Dragoon Guards (1922)
- 7th (The Princess Royal's) Dragoon Guards (1788, from 4th Irish Horse); redesignated 7th Dragoon Guards (Princess Royal's) (1921); amalgamated to form 4th/7th Dragoon Guards (1922)

The Dragoon Guards regiments were converted to armoured cars and tanks during the 1930s. There are still three Dragoon Guards regiments in the British Army:

- 1st The Queen's Dragoon Guards
- Royal Scots Dragoon Guards
- Royal Dragoon Guards

== Canadian Dragoon Guards Regiments ==
- The Princess Louise Dragoon Guards (5th Princess Louise Dragoon Guards from 1903 - 1920); amalgamated with the 4th Hussars of Canada in 1936 to form the 4th Princess Louise Dragoon Guards. Currently inactive / in suspended animation on the Supplementary Order of Battle.
