= Princess Louise Dragoon Guards =

The Princess Louise Dragoon Guards
- Active: 1872–1936
- Country: Canada
- Branch: Canadian Militia
- Type: Dragoon Guards
- Role: Cavalry
- Size: Independent cavalry troop (1872–1879); Independent cavalry squadron (1879–1903); One regiment (1903–1936)
- Part of: Non-Permanent Active Militia
- Garrison/HQ: Ottawa, Ontario
- Patron: Princess Louise, Duchess of Argyll
- Engagements: Low Rebellion; South African War; First World War
- Battle honours: See #Battle honours

The Princess Louise Dragoon Guards was a heavy cavalry regiment of the Non-Permanent Active Militia of the Canadian Militia (now the Canadian Army). First formed in 1872 as an independent cavalry troop, in 1903 it became a full regiment. In 1936, the regiment was amalgamated with the 4th Hussars of Canada to become the 4th Princess Louise Dragoon Guards.

== Lineage ==
=== The Princess Louise Dragoon Guards ===
- Originated on 1 January 1903, in Ottawa, Ontario, as the Princess Louise Dragoon Guards.
- Redesignated on 1 February 1903, as the 5th Princess Louise Dragoon Guards.
- Redesignated on 15 March 1920, as The Princess Louise Dragoon Guards.
- Amalgamated on 15 December 1936, with the 4th Hussars of Canada and Redesignated as the 4th Princess Louise Dragoon Guards.

== Perpetuations ==
- 8th Regiment, Canadian Mounted Rifles

== History ==
=== Early history ===
On 23 May 1872, the Ottawa Troop of Cavalry was formed as an independent cavalry troop, and on 15 November 1878, the unit was redesignated as a troop of dragoon guards.

A year later on 3 January 1879, the troop was expanded to a full independent cavalry squadron and renamed as The Princess Louise Dragoon Guards in honour of its patron, the Princess Louise, Marchioness of Lorne, who was the wife of the Governor General, the Marquess of Lorne.

As the only cavalry unit in Ottawa, the PLDG had the honour to provide the mounted escort for the governor general within the capital.

=== South Africa ===
During the Second Boer War, volunteers from the PLDG served with the 2nd (Special Service) Battalion, The Royal Canadian Regiment; the 1st Battalion, Canadian Mounted Rifles; and the South African Constabulary from 1899 to 1902.

=== Early 1900s ===
On 1 January 1903, The Princess Louise Dragoon Guards were expanded to a full regiment, and later that year on 1 February, were redesignated as the 5th Princess Louise Dragoon Guards, taking over the regimental number and order of precedence from the former 5th Dragoons, which had been amalgamated with the 6th Duke of Connaught's Royal Canadian Hussars in 1901.

=== First World War ===
The 5th Princess Louise Dragoon Guards were not mobilized for service during the First World War but sent volunteers to help raise the 8th Canadian Mounted Rifles for service with the Canadian Expeditionary Force.

On 15 March 1915, the 8th Regiment, Canadian Mounted Rifles, CEF was authorized for service, and on 8 October 1915, the regiment embarked for the United Kingdom. After its arrival in the UK, on 29 January 1916, its personnel were absorbed by the 39th Reserve Battalion, and a draft was sent to the 4th Battalion, Canadian Mounted Rifles, CEF on the Western Front. This draft served with the rest of the 4th CMR at the Battle of Mont Sorrel in June 1916, which later qualified the PLDG post-war for the battle honour Mount Sorrel. On 8 December 1917, the 8th CMR was disbanded.

=== 1920s–1930s ===
As a result of the Otter Commission, on 15 March 1920, the regiment was redesignated once again as The Princess Louise Dragoon Guards.

On 15 December 1936, as a result of the 1936 Canadian Militia reorganization, The Princess Louise Dragoon Guards were amalgamated with the 4th Hussars of Canada to become the 4th Princess Louise Dragoon Guards.

== Alliances ==
- United Kingdom - 10th Royal Hussars (Prince of Wales's Own) (Until 1936)

== Uniform ==
Since the 1870s, the Princess Louise Dragoon Guards wore a full-dress uniform similar to that of the Carabiniers (6th Dragoon Guards). This consisted of a dark blue dragoon tunic with white collar and cuffs, facings and piping, and dark blue trousers with white double stripes. The regimental headdress consisted of a brass cavalry helmet with a white horsehair plume. Their undress dark blue peaked cap had a scarlet band and piping, which was a unique distinction granted to this regiment.

After its amalgamation with the 4th Hussars in 1936, the newly formed 4th Princess Louise Dragoon Guards continued to use this uniform in full dress until they were placed on the Supplementary Order of Battle in 1965.

== Battle honours ==
=== South African War ===
- South Africa, 1900

=== Great War ===
- Mount Sorrel

== Notable members ==
- Lorne W. R. Mulloy DCM

== See also ==
- List of regiments of cavalry of the Canadian Militia (1900–1920)
