= Roman Jarymowycz =

- Born: January 18, 1945; Vienna, Austria
- Died: January 19, 2017 (aged 72)
- Occupations: Canadian soldier and military educator

Lieutenant-Colonel (Retd) Roman Jarymowycz, OMM, CD, Ph.D. (January 18, 1945 – January 19, 2017) was a decorated Canadian soldier and military educator. He was also a student of Canadian military history and made important contributions to the contemporary debate about Canada and the Normandy campaign in World War II.

== Background ==
Roman Johann Jarymowycz, born January 18, 1945, in Vienna, Austria, and of Ukrainian heritage, was a naturalized Canadian citizen. He was a lifelong resident of the island of Montreal and was a member of the Byzantine Catholic Church. He was a teacher of over 30 years at St. Thomas High School in Pointe-Claire, Quebec. His primary subjects were Canadian History and Social Studies, and he also coached the high school's championship-winning debating and public-speaking team. Additionally, and without the benefit of ever having played a game of the sport, he was an assistant rugby coach.

He was married to former teaching colleague Sandra Pasquale. Both had been married once before, and Jarymowycz had a stepson. Their union produced no issue, but he had two half-brothers, Bohdan Kostjuk and Alexander Kostjuk.

Jarymowycz was a sessional lecturer at the Royal Military College and was a frequent writer of letters to the editor.

He was also a cartoonist of some skill and humour, having had work regularly appear in the old Canadian Forces magazine Sentinel.

He died January 19, 2017, of a massive heart attack suffered during his 72nd birthday party.

== Military career ==
Jarymowycz began his military career as a student at Loyola College in 1964 in the Canadian Officers’ Training Corps. Eventually he was promoted to lieutenant-colonel and commanding officer of the Royal Canadian Hussars armoured reconnaissance regiment during the late 1970s and early 1980s. A dedicated Cold Warrior, he served in Europe several times on NATO exercises.

After the Hussars he served as a senior staff officer (armoured) for Land Force Quebec Area Headquarters. Perhaps his most important appointment came in 1982 when he became an instructor for the Militia Command Staff Course at the Canadian Land Force Command and Staff College at CFB Kingston. He was an instructor for over 15 years and in 1994 was made dean of the course. While this recognition is mostly ceremonial, it was a tribute to the great contribution he made to Canadian military education. His trenchant analysis and animated classroom lectures placed him at the head of the faculty, of which he was later Director.

He was twice decorated, with the Canadian Forces' Decoration (CD) for long service and the Order of Military Merit (Canada) (OMM) on June 29, 2001. Quoting the notice from the governor general of Canada:

"During the last 15 years as an instructor, leading to the position of Dean of the Militia Command and Staff Course, Lieutenant-Colonel Jarymowycz has had a profoundly positive impact on the quality of senior Militia officer training in the Canadian Forces. He has 34 years of service in the Forces."

== Academic career ==
Jarymowycz graduated from Loyola College (of Montreal) with a BA in the late 1960s. He received his Master's degree from Concordia University and in the 1990s returned to McGill University. Under the direction of noted Canadian military historian Desmond Morton, he received his PhD in 1997.

His first book, Tank tactics: from Normandy to Lorraine was based his McGill thesis ("The quest for operational manoeuvre in the Normandy campaign : Simonds and Montgomery attempt the armoured breakout.") The book is a stimulating analysis of the development of Canadian armoured operations and tactics, with comparisons to American tank operational theory and Soviet "deep battle" strategy. His chapter on the effectiveness of the German Tiger tank in Normandy, while essentially being a separate essay, is a fine example of superior scholarship.

While generally well received, the book is not without its critics. Major Michael McNorgan, writing in the Canadian Military Journal, found it "an interesting book that must be read and interpreted with care." Major (ret’d) R.H. Caldwell, writing in The Army Doctrine and Training Bulletin, likened the book to more of a case study, and suggested that while it presented much new primary source information, this was done selectively. Both reviews noted many minor errors.

Jarymowycz’s book and thesis address (not unlike Terry Copp’s work) the conclusions of eminent Canadian historians C. P. Stacey and John English. They argue that the Canadian Army, in Normandy in World War II (and for Jarymowycz, especially the Canadian Armoured Corps) was not as good as the German Army, and certainly did not match the reputation of the Canadian Expeditionary Force in World War I, which was widely regarded as an elite force. One of Jarymowycz’s main conclusions, that “The most successful Canadian armoured tradition is the squadron attack. Canadian Armoured doctrine evolved in battle” serves two purposes. It indicates that failure rests at higher levels of command, where Canadian leadership was inadequate to the task of operational manoeuvre, and that lower (tactical) levels of command Canadian armour performed with bravery and determination that had no match. Unfortunately, the high rate of tank casualties was evidence of both valour and the grave danger of battlefield learning. This conclusion is not fully convincing, though, due to the weak comparative analysis. The development of American tank doctrine is adequately covered, but the side argument about Soviet "glubokii boi" is not fully developed. Finally, no matter of revisionism, indeed, not even the eventual victory, can excuse the bottom line, which is unsuccessful operations and terribly high casualty rates.

Additionally, Jarymowycz was part of a lively debate in the pages of The Army Doctrine and Training Bulletin. His position was that auftragstaktik [mission oriented tactics] and manoeuvre warfare might not be the best doctrinal choices for the Canadian Army.

Jarymowycz's contributions to the re-evaluation (and rehabilitation) of the Canadian Army and Armoured Corps in World War II put him in good company. He was in the van of a dynamic debate, which included work by Terry Copp, Brian Reid and Donald Graves.

His second book, The Warhorse - Hoof to Track – The quest for mobility, was published in December 2007 by Greenwood Publishing.

== Television ==
Jarymowycz has appeared in two high profile Canadian Broadcasting Corporation television productions.

The first was Brian McKenna's much maligned 1992 docu-drama The Valour and the Horror. Jarymowycz appeared in the third instalment, In Desperate Battle: Normandy 1944, and provided critical analysis of the Canadian Army's disaster at the Battle of Verrières Ridge.

He also appeared in McKenna's 2007 CBC Television documentary The Great War. Jarymowycz puts in a far less critical performance in this non-controversial program.
