= 17th Duke of York's Royal Canadian Hussars =

17th Duke of York’s Royal Canadian Hussars
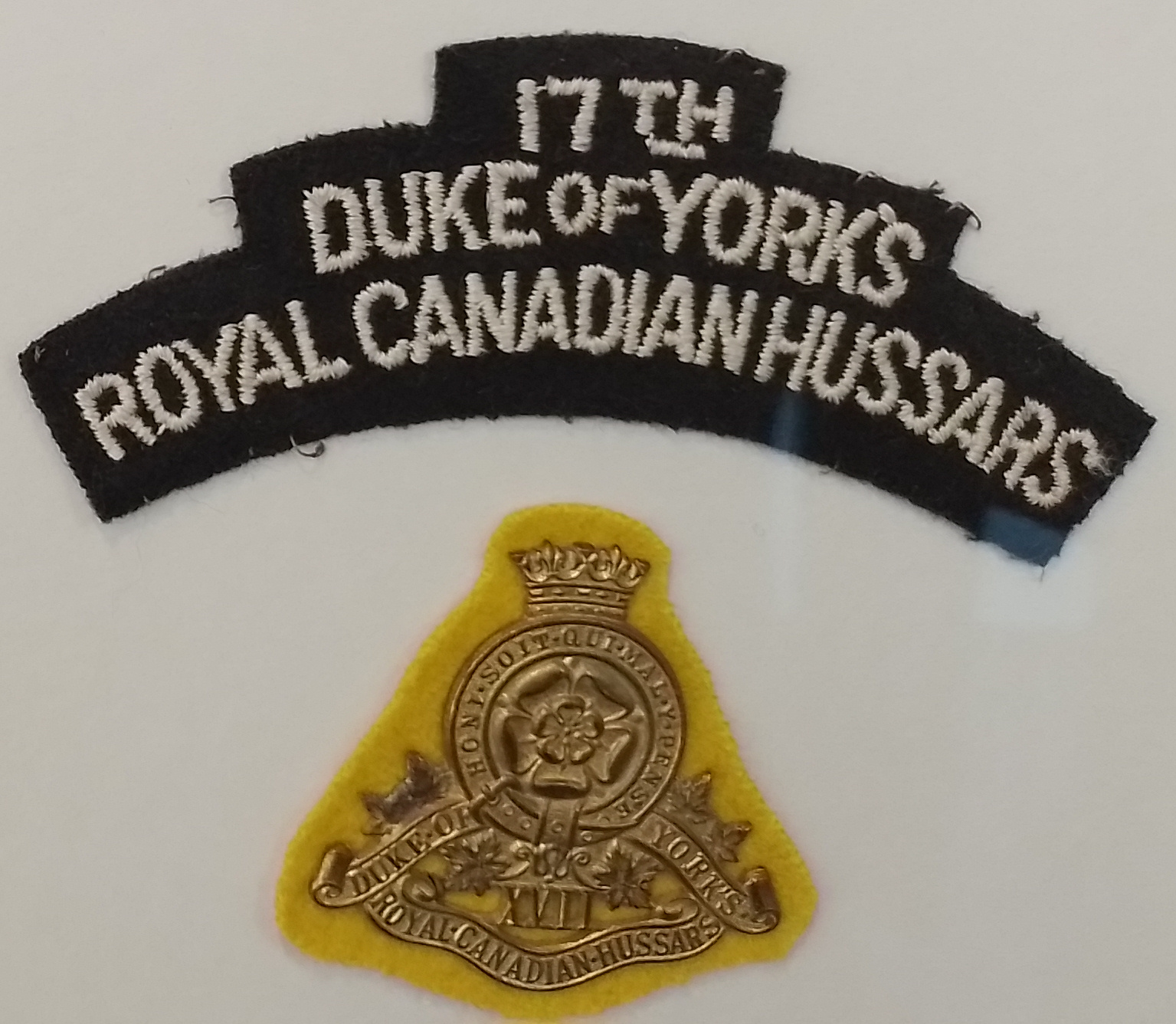
- Arm and field cap badges of the Regiment.
- Active: 1897–1958
- Country: Canada
- Branch: Canadian Militia (1897–1940); Canadian Army (1940–1958)
- Type: Hussars
- Role: Cavalry (1897–1939); Reconnaissance (1939–1958)
- Size: One regiment
- Part of: Non-Permanent Active Militia (1897–1940); Royal Canadian Armoured Corps (1940–1958)
- Garrison/HQ: Montreal, Quebec
- Engagements: South African War; First World War; Second World War
- Battle honours: See #Battle Honours

The 17th Duke of York's Royal Canadian Hussars was a light cavalry regiment of the Non-Permanent Active Militia of the Canadian Militia (now the Canadian Army). First organized in 1879 as "A" Squadron of the 6th Duke of Connaught's Royal Canadian Hussars, it became an independent squadron in 1897 and a full regiment in 1907. In 1958, the regiment was amalgamated with the 6th Duke of Connaught's Royal Canadian Hussars to form The Royal Canadian Hussars (Montreal).

== Lineage ==
=== 17th Duke of York's Royal Canadian Hussars ===
- Originated on 1 March 1907, in Montreal, as The 17th Duke of York's Royal Canadian Hussars.
- Redesignated on 15 July 1912, as The 17th Duke of York's Royal Canadian Hussars "Argenteuil Rangers".
- Redesignated on 15 March 1920, as the 17th Duke of York's Royal Canadian Hussars.
- Redesignated on 11 February 1941, as the 2nd (Reserve) Regiment, 17th Duke of York's Royal Canadian Hussars.
- Redesignated on 1 April 1941, as the 7th (Reserve) Reconnaissance Battalion, (17th Duke of York's Royal Canadian Hussars).
- Redesignated on 8 June 1942, as the 7th (Reserve) Reconnaissance Regiment (17th Duke of York's Royal Canadian Hussars), CAC.
- Redesignated on 2 August 1945, as the 7th (Reserve) Reconnaissance Regiment (17th Duke of York's Royal Canadian Hussars), RCAC.
- Redesignated on 4 February 1949, as the 17th Duke of York's Royal Canadian Hussars (7th Reconnaissance Regiment).
- Redesignated on 19 May 1958, as the 17th Duke of York's Royal Canadian Hussars.
- Amalgamated on 16 September 1958, with the 6th Duke of Connaught's Royal Canadian Hussars and redesignated as The Royal Canadian Hussars (Montreal).

=== 11th Regiment Argenteuil Rangers ===
- Originated on 14 June 1862, in Gore, Quebec, as the 11th Battalion Volunteer Militia Infantry of Canada or Argenteuil Rangers.
- Later redesignated in the same year as the 11th Battalion of Infantry Argenteuil Rangers.
- Redesignated on 8 May 1900, as the 11th Regiment Argenteuil Rangers.
- Disbanded on 15 April 1912, and personnel absorbed by The 17th Duke of York's Royal Canadian Hussars and redesignated as The 17th Duke of York's Royal Canadian Hussars "Argenteuil Rangers".

== History ==
=== Early history ===
On 1 July 1897, "A" Squadron, 6th Duke of Connaught's Royal Canadian Hussars (first authorized on 27 September 1855) was detached from that regiment and was designated as the Montreal Hussars.

In 1898, the squadron was subsequently redesignated as The Duke of York's Royal Canadian Hussars.

=== South African War ===
During the South African War, The Duke of York's Royal Canadian Hussars contributed volunteers for the Canadian contingents in the field. Most notably, volunteers from both the 6th Duke of Connaught's Royal Canadian Hussars and the Duke of York's Royal Canadian Hussars formed the 1st Canadian Mounted Rifles.

=== Early 1900s ===
In 1907, the Duke of York's Royal Canadian Hussars achieved full regimental status as the 17th Duke of York's Royal Canadian Hussars.

On 15 July 1912, "B" Squadron was transferred to the 33rd Vaudreuil and Soulanges Hussars and was replaced in the 17th by personnel from the disbanded 11th Argenteuil Rangers. The regiment was then redesignated as The 17th Duke of York's Royal Canadian Hussars (Argenteuil Rangers).

=== First World War ===
On 6 August 1914, details of the 17th Duke of York's Royal Canadian Hussars "Argenteuil Rangers" were placed on active service for local protection duties.

With the formation of the Canadian Expeditionary Force, volunteers from both the 6th Duke of Connaught's Royal Canadian Hussars and the 17th Duke of York's Royal Canadian Hussars "Argenteuil Rangers" helped form the 5th Canadian Mounted Rifles which served on the Western Front.

=== Second World War ===
On 26 August 1939, details of the 17th Duke of York's Royal Canadian Hussars were called out on service and then on 1 September 1939, placed on active service under the designation as the 17th Duke of York's Royal Canadian Hussars, CASF, for local protection duties. With the outbreak of WWII, the 17th Hussars became the last Canadian cavalry regiment to pay off their horses and become mechanized. On 31 December 1940, those details called out on active service were disbanded.

==== 7th Reconnaissance Regiment (17th Duke of York's Royal Canadian Hussars) ====
On 24 May 1940, the 17th Hussars mobilized the 3rd Canadian Motorcycle Regiment, CASF (17 H) for active service. On 1 February 1941, the regiment was redesignated as the 17th (Active) Duke of York's Royal Canadian Hussars, CASF and again on 11 February 1941, as the 7th Reconnaissance Battalion (17th Duke of York's Royal Canadian Hussars), CAC, CASF. On 23 August 1941, the regiment embarked for Great Britain.

On 8 June 1942, the regiment was redesignated as the 7th Reconnaissance Regiment (17th Duke of York's Royal Canadian Hussars), CAC, CASF and became the reconnaissance regiment for the 3rd Canadian Division.

On 6 June 1944, detachments of the regiment's "B" Squadron landed on Juno Beach in Normandy as part of the 3rd Canadian Infantry Division and were later followed by the remainder of the regiment in June and July. The regiment fought in northwest Europe in support of the 3rd Canadian Infantry Division until the end of the war. On 15 January 1946, the 7th Reconnaissance Regiment (17th Duke of York's Royal Canadian Hussars) was disbanded.

==== Canadian Army Occupation Force ====
On 1 June 1945, the 2nd/7th Reconnaissance Regiment, CAC, CAOF was mobilized for service with the Canadian Army Occupation Force. On 2 August 1945, the regiment was redesignated as the 2nd/7th Reconnaissance Regiment, RCAC, CAOF. On 24 May 1946, the 2nd/7th Reconnaissance Regiment was disbanded.

== Alliances ==
- United Kingdom - 13th Hussars (Until 1922)
- United Kingdom - 13th/18th Royal Hussars (Queen Mary's Own) (1922–1958)

== Uniform ==
As with most of the hussar regiments in the Canadian Militia / Canadian Army, the 17th Hussars wore a full-dress uniform similar to that of the British Army's 13th Hussars. This uniform consisted of a dark blue hussar tunic with buff facings and yellow piping and blue trousers with two yellow stripes. For regimental headdress, a hussar busby with bag and plume was worn.

The undress uniform also shared with that of other Canadian hussar regiments consisted of a dark blue serge frock jacket and a dark blue peaked cap with white band and piping and came with a removable white cover worn in the summer.

== Battle Honours ==
=== South African War ===
- South Africa, 1900

=== Second World War ===
- Caen
- Falaise
- The Laison
- The Scheldt
- Breskens Pocket
- The Rhineland
- The Rhine
- Emmerich-Hoch Elten
- Zutphen
- Deventer
- North-West Europe, 1944–1945

== Notable members ==
- Lieutenant General E. L. M. “Tommy” Burns CC DSO OBE MC CD
- Lieutenant Colonel John Bayne Maclean
- Honorary Lieutenant-Colonel James L. Ross
- Lieutenant Colonel Sir John Abbott, Commanding Officer of the 11th Regiment Argenteuil Rangers, 1862 - 1884 - 3rd Prime Minister of Canada

== See also ==
- List of regiments of cavalry of the Canadian Militia (1900–1920)
