= Lorne W. R. Mulloy =

Canadian soldier and lawyer

Colonel Lorne Winfield Redmond Mulloy DCM
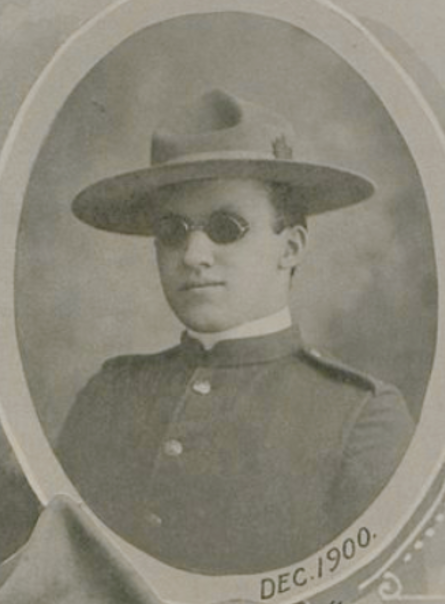
- Born: April 14, 1879; North Dundas, Ontario, Canada
- Died: February 21, 1932 (aged 52); Iroquois, Ontario, Canada
- Burial place: Iroquois Point Cemetery
- Alma mater: Queen's University; Balliol College, Oxford
- Military career
- Allegiance: Canada
- Branch: Canadian Militia
- Service years: 1899–1900; 1914–1916
- Rank: Trooper; Honorary Colonel
- Nickname: The Blind Trooper
- Units: The Princess Louise Dragoon Guards; 1st Canadian Mounted Rifles; 146th Battalion, CEF
- Conflicts: Second Boer War: Battle of Kroonstad; Battle of Doornkop; Battle of Diamond Hill; Battle of Witpoort (WIA); First World War
- Awards: Distinguished Conduct Medal; Queen's South Africa Medal
- Other work: Professor, Lawyer, Politician

Lorne Winfield Redmond Mulloy (April 14, 1879 – February 21, 1932) was a Canadian soldier, hero of the Boer War, professor at the Royal Military College of Canada, and prominent lawyer. He was blinded in both eyes at the Battle of Witpoort and was awarded the Distinguished Conduct Medal.

== Early life ==
Lorne Winfield Redmond Mulloy was born on a farm located at Lot 21, Concession 7 in Mountain Township, Dundas. The farm, which had been owned by the Mulloys since 1864, was not far from the villages of Winchester and Chesterville. His father, George Mulloy (1815–1888), was born in Ireland and immigrated to Dundas County. His mother, Mary Redmond (1835–1917), was born in Matilda, Dundas County.

Many secondary sources state his birth date as April 14, 1879. However, records from his early life suggest that his birth year was 1876, including the 1881, 1891, and 1901 Censuses of Canada. His enlistment record, dated December 28, 1899, states his age as 24 years (born 1875). A birth record exists for a child of George Mulloy and Mary Redmond named Redmond Laura Mulloy, female, born April 17, 1876.

Mulloy's mother came from a military family. Her father, Marcus Redmond (1797–1889), had served with the 1st Regiment of Dundas during the War of 1812 and at Prescott during the Rebellions of 1837–1838. Her paternal grandfather, Nicholas Redmond (1760-), had fought with the Prince of Wales' American Regiment in the American Revolution, while her maternal grandfather, Johannes Ault (1765-1851), had served with the King's Royal Regiment of New York.

Mulloy attended local schools in Dundas before becoming principal at a school in Navan. While serving as principal, the Second Boer War broke out, and patriotic fever swept the country. Although he had planned on attending university, Mulloy could not turn down his chance to serve. He joined the local cavalry regiment, The Princess Louise Dragoon Guards, and on December 28, 1899, he was selected as part of a group of ten men from Ottawa to join the mounted contingent bound for South Africa, along with Edward Holland who would win the Victoria Cross.

== Military Service ==
Once enlisted in Ottawa, Mulloy and the others were shipped to Montreal, where they received uniforms and equipment, and thence to Halifax for further training and embarkment. On February 21, 1900, they sailed for Cape Town, arriving in March and proceeding at once to the front. Mulloy and the Canadian Mounted Rifles fought at the Battle of Kroonstad, Battle of Doornkop, and the Battle of Diamond Hill. Throughout June and July, they were stationed in Johannesburg and Pretoria, fighting off Boer attempts at recapture.

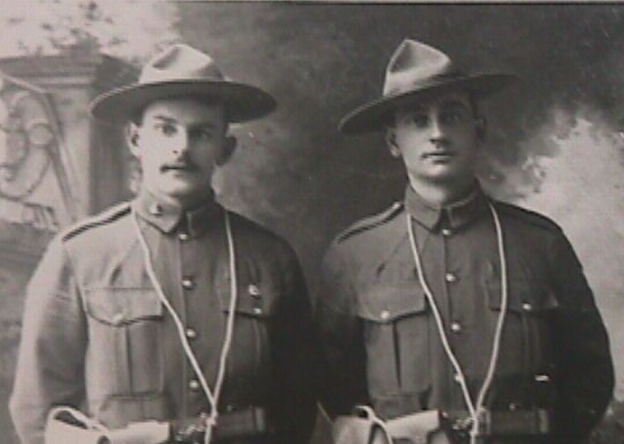
Troopers E. Holland V.C. and L. Mulloy D.C.M.

On July 12, the British and Canadian forces conducted an advance from the capital against the Boers, taking up defensive positions at Witpoort and Koffeyspruit. On July 16, 1900, the Boers launched an attack on the positions, and the Canadian Mounted Rifles, under the command of Harold Lothrop Borden, fought desperately on the kopjes. The Canadians were ordered to mount and, riding at full gallop, headed for a ridge while shells and bullets flew through the air around them. The troops arrived at the ridge, dismounted and swarmed up the steep slope, reaching the summit as the enemy took cover among various boulders. The Canadians attacked under heavy fire, and rushed forward to secure the top of the ridge. Lieutenant J.E. Burch of the 2nd RCD, whose father was in the same unit, and four soldiers, including Mulloy, found themselves cut off from their comrades and heavily outnumbered by the enemy. Sergeant A.E. Rose described the engagement:

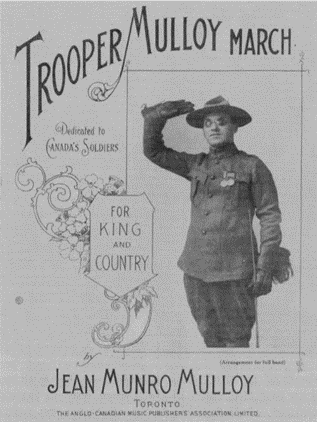
Trooper Mulloy March

“The part of the kopje which Lieut. Borden went over was about 12 feet high, with front almost perpendicular. Before reaching the steepest part of the hill Trooper Brown fell, shot through the lung. Lieut. Borden and the remainder of his troop climbed the steep hill and found them selves face to face with the Boers. Lieut. Burch and his men were advancing along the side and near the foot of the kopje. The Boers and Canadians now held peculiar positions. Some of the Boers managed to get behind part of the Canadians placing the last named in a critical position. Soon after mounting the kopje poor Borden fell, a Mauser bullet piercing his heart. Lieut. Burch and four troopers found them selves in advance of the other Canadians with the Boers in front and behind them. The Boers called on them to surrender, but the five plucky Canadians refused to surrender, and kept the Boers at bay. Two rifles choked, yet the remaining three continued to keep the Boers off. Then Lieut. Burch received a wound in the left knee. He continued to fire and was in the act of raising his rifle when a Mauser bullet hit him in the side, causing a fatal wound. But the Boer who committed the deed also fired his last shot, as he was knocked over at the same time. One of the remaining four men - Mulloy of Ottawa - raised his head and immediately a bullet carried of his nose. Poor fellow! He may lose the sight of both eyes. Corp. Price was just an instant too late in firing at the Boer who caused Mulloy’s wound but he prevented him from ever firing again. Mulloy had left the cover of a boulder to take the rifle of a wounded Boer; his own weapon had jammed while Mulloy was giving his bandolier to Corporal Price, who was running short of ammunition. Two Boers fired at him from about forty feet away; one bullet grazed his forehead and the other struck him in the left eye. Mulloy dropped to his knees and did not lose consciousness but attempted to find cover. His comrades fired on the enemy who surrendered or fled."

This engagement became famous in Canada, not only because of the bravery of the soldiers, but because of the deaths of the two officers, notably Lieutenant Borden, the only son of the Minister of Militia. Mulloy's wound was serious, but not fatal, though he lost his sight in both eyes, being the only fully blind Canadian casualty of the war. He was treated at field hospitals in South Africa until September, when he proceeded to England for further rehabilitation and finally back to Canada in mid-December 1900.

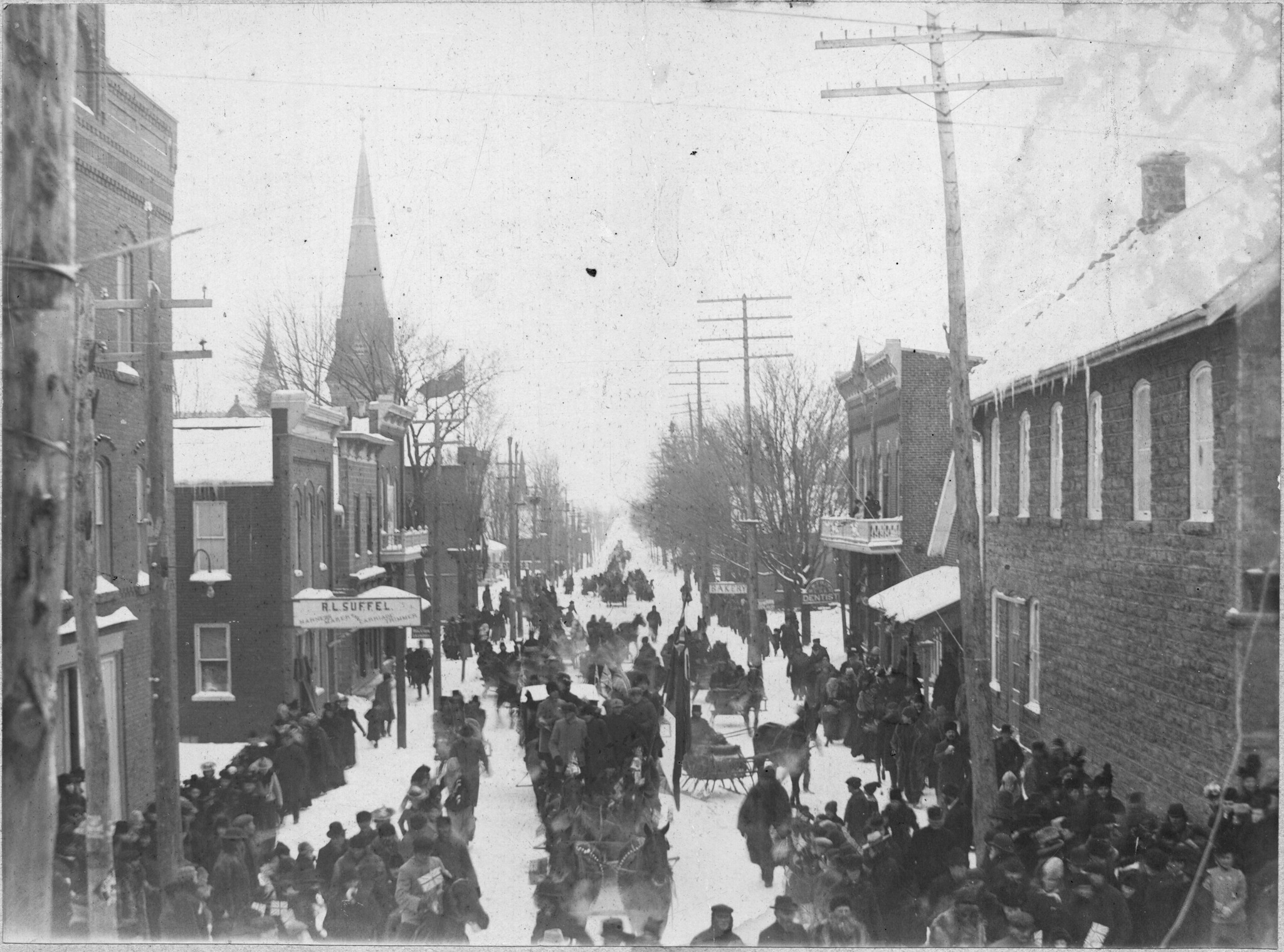
Welcome home parade for Boer War veterans, Winchester, December 1900

For his gallant conduct at the Battle of Witpoort on July 16, 1900, Trooper Lorne Mulloy was awarded the second highest military honour for bravery, the Distinguished Conduct Medal. Mulloy received the medal on September 21, 1901, at a ceremony at the Parliament buildings in Ottawa during the royal visit of the Duke of Cornwall. The Duke presented the medal and spoke with Mulloy about the battle. The scene motivated the 'Matters Military column' in the Ottawa Journal to reflect on the fortunes of war:

“Perhaps the most touching scene ever witnessed in Ottawa was that of Lieutenant Ed Holland, V.C., leading blind Trooper Mulloy before the Duke and Duchess to receive his decoration. Lieut. Holland has escaped unscathed to wear the emblem of his valor and to be recognized as a man who has won the highest distinction in the British army, while poor Mulloy, just as willing, just as brave, just as true, has been deemed to go through the world in darkness.

== Public Career and Community Service ==
Following his return from the Boer War and recuperation from his wound, Mulloy was determined to live not only a normal life, but a life of service and hard work. He attended Queen's University and graduated in 1906 with an honours degree in Philosophy and Political Economy. Mulloy proved to be an outstanding student, being president of his year and critic for the Alma Mater Society. With support from the Canadian Patriotic Fund, Mulloy attended Balliol College, Oxford, graduating with distinction in 1910 with a Masters in Political Economy.

In the 1910s, Mulloy worked hard to promote stronger ties between Britain and Canada, becoming an accomplished speaker and debater. When he returned to Canada, he was appointed a professor of Military History and Strategy at the Royal Military College of Canada.

During the First World War, Mulloy served as Honorary Colonel to the 146th Battalion, CEF and was at the forefront of promoting the war effort. He gave numerous talks and speeches, and was a prominent member of the Canadian National Service League, advocating for conscription in 1917.

Following the war, Mulloy returned to Dundas County, settling in Iroquois. In 1921, he began studying law at Osgoode Hall Law School in Toronto, Ontario. He was given permission to write his exams without attending lectures due to his disability. In six weeks, he studied a whole year's worth of material with the help of a school teacher in Iroquois, who read the material to him. He passed his supplementary exams in September 1921 with honours. He passed his second year exams the following spring, also with honours. He passed his final exams with honours the following year and completed his studies. He articled with Arthur Flynn, a barrister and solicitor in Morrisburg. He was called to the bar on November 22, 1923 and was enrolled as both a barrister-at-law and a solicitor. His law office was located in the west wing of his home in Iroquois.

Mulloy became widely known in the legal community in Ontario. He was also active in politics and local affairs in Dundas County, serving on the Iroquois Village Council as a councillor in 1926, 1927, and 1928.

In June 1922, he established the Iroquois Post and Matilda Advertiser in partnership with Mahlon W. Beach, Frank Milligan, and others. The newspaper was published by J. A. Keeler, who had previously worked for Iroquois' other newspaper, the St. Lawrence News, under its late owner, R. S. Pelton. It was an Independent weekly newspaper. Its first edition was published on June 8, 1922.

He had a strong interest in community sports. He helped to form the Iroquois Arena Company, which built the village arena. He played a part in the establishment of the St. Lawrence Box Lacross League (1931) and the Iroquois Driving Club. He was President of the St. Lawrence Senior Hockey League, Vice President of the St. Lawrence Junior Hockey League, and Vice President of the St. Lawrence Box Lacross League. From 1930 to 1932, he was active in the management of both the senior and junior hockey teams in Iroquois.

In 1931, he donated a silver championship trophy to the St. Lawrence Box Lacrosse League, which was named in his honour. The trophy engraving reads:

"The Mulloy Trophy
for the
Championship
of the
St. Lawrence Amateur Box Lacrosse League
for
Annual Competitions
Presented by
Col. Lorne Winfield Mulloy D.M.C., B.A."

Mulloy was an active man even into his later life, with a keen interest in horse riding, sailing, and golf.

In the later years of his life, he was vocally opposed to the St. Lawrence River developments that had been in discussion for several decades between the United States and Canada. He saw the proposed international power agreements as a threat to local historic landmarks and the beauty of the St. Lawrence River waterfront. Shortly before his death, he published an article in the Iroquois Post on the subject, in which he stated:

"Under the recommendations of the Engineers, it appears that the town of Iroquois is doomed to destruction. Whether a single stage of double stage development is finally agreed upon does not matter. In either case the Village will be several feet under water...It is well to remember that what is done now will be done not alone for this generation but for those of centuries to come. The St. Lawrence River, while the back door for the United States, is Canada's front door, and every mile of its beautiful, natural contour which can be preserved now will be a worthy heritage and a lasting benefit to posterity."

This development would later occur as part of the St. Lawrence Seaway and Power Project in the 1950s. Both Mulloy estate (The Maples) and gravesite were in the path of the Seaway Project. His and his wife's remains were moved in 1957 and the house was demolished in early July 1958.

== Personal life ==
On March 4, 1911, Lorne Mulloy married Jean Munro, a well-known soprano who had studied at the Boston Conservatory of Music. Jean Munro would be the author of various patriotic marches and tunes during the First World War; including the Trooper Mulloy March and Johnnie Canuck's the Boy.

In September 1912, he purchased a bungalow and fishing lodge in Iroquois, Ontario as a summer home for him and his wife.

Around 1921 or 1922, Mulloy purchased a property on Iroquois Point, which became the Mulloy estate, otherwise known as "The Maples." It consisted of about 7 acres of land on the banks of the St. Lawrence River, located across the canal and just west of the village. The stone house on the property had been built around 1812 by one of the community's early settlers, Michael Carman III, for his son Peter. The home was later occupied by Peter's brother Daniel, and then another brother, Philip. Philip's daughter, Anna, and her husband William Redmond (Reeve of Iroquois) lived in the home for a time before selling it to George A. Thompson. Around 1919, it had been sold to a Mr. and Mrs. Boyce of Ottawa. Several years later, it was purchased by the Mulloys. Mulloy practiced law from the west wing of this property. He was originally buried on the property as well. The house was demolished during the St. Lawrence Seaway and Power Project in 1958.

== Death ==
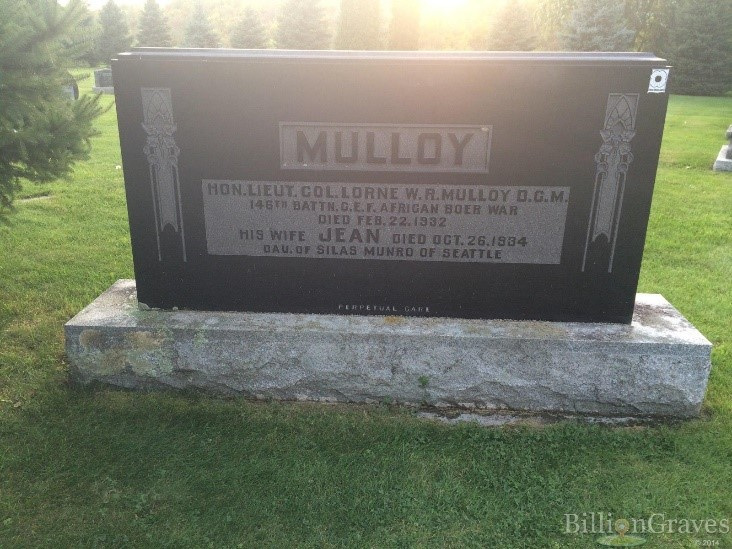
Grave of Col. Mulloy

Mulloy struggled with heart issues and low blood pressure, which had led him to somewhat curtail his work and other activities during the last few years of his life.

On the evening of February 20, 1932, Mulloy appeared to be in good health and high spirits when he attended the St. Lawrence Junior Hockey League championship game at the Iroquois arena. Afterward, he presented the Gill Cup to the Iroquois Juniors, of which he was manager. The following afternoon, he went upstairs to bed and suffered a heart attack that lasted several hours. He died just before 11:30 pm on February 21, 1932.

His funeral was held three days later on February 24. Local schools and businesses were closed for the event, and it was attended by about 2,000 people. The procession left his home, The Maples, at 2:30 pm. The service took place at the Iroquois United Church, after which the procession proceeded to the Iroquois Point Cemetery. He was given full military honours under the direction of the 4th Hussars, the regiment that Mulloy had first enlisted with in 1899. The lengthy cortege was led by the hearse carrying Mulloy's casket, which was draped with the Union Jack and topped with the stetson that he had worn during the Boer War. The hearse was followed by a lone cavalry mount with the boots reversed in the stirrups. According to Jack Schecter, "there were at least seventy-five veterans of the South African and the First World War at the funeral, including Major G.H. Collins, who had served with Mulloy 30 years earlier at the fateful Battle of Witpoort." The procession also included members of the hockey teams in the St. Lawrence Leagues.

Following the funeral, Mulloy's remains were placed in the vault at Iroquois Point. In late April, about two months after his death, it was announced that, with permission from the Ontario Government, one acre of the Mulloy estate in Iroquois would be designated as a park and private burial ground. Mulloy's body was buried in the new Lorne Mulloy Memorial Cemetery, which was located at the top of a hill that overlooked the St. Lawrence River. His wife Jean, who died in 1934, was buried next to him.

The Mulloys' gravesite remained unmarked for several years. In September 1936, around the time that the estate was sold, newspapers across Ontario reported about the lack of headstone and described the gravesite as "overgrown with weeds." By August 1937, it was reported that a simple marker had recently been erected. It read only: "Hon. Col. L. W. Mulloy." There was no marker for his wife, nor was there any mention of Mulloy's service. Some time later, a military-style headstone was erected with the inscription: "Hon. Lt.-Col. Lorne W. R. Mulloy, CDM, 146th Battalion, CEF, died Feb. 22, 1932, and his wife Jean Munro Mulloy." The headstone and gravesite were maintained by the veterans of Iroquois until the St. Lawrence Seaway Project in the 1950s.

Because the cemetery was located within the area that would be flooded for the Seaway Project, it needed to be moved. The Ontario Hydro-Electric Power Commission was responsible for relocating grave markers (and remains, if requested) that were in the flood area. Mahlon W. Beach and his wife Lillian, who were both close friends of the Mulloys, provided space in their plot at the Iroquois United Church Cemetery (part of the Iroquois Point Cemetery) for Lorne and Jean to be reburied. The Mulloys' names were inscribed on the back of the Beach family headstone.

== See also ==
- Dundas County, Ontario
- Second Boer War
- Canadian Mounted Rifles
