= Scott Taylor (journalist) =

Canadian journalist

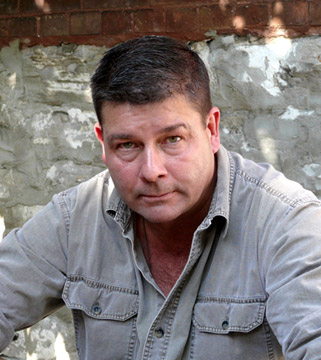
Scott Taylor, Publisher of Esprit de Corps in 2010

Scott Taylor (born December 30, 1960) is a Canadian journalist, author and publisher who specializes in military journalism and war reporting. His coverage has included wars in Cambodia, Africa, the Persian Gulf, Turkey, South Ossetia, the Balkans, Afghanistan, Iraq, and Libya. He has worked as the editor and publisher of Esprit de Corps, since 1988. Taylor has won Press TV's ' Unembedded Journalist of the Year' Award for 2008. In 1996 he received the Quill Award, as well as the Alexander MacKenzie Award for journalistic excellence.

Taylor is a regular op-ed contributor to the Halifax Herald newspaper, as well as the Embassy Magazine. He has also contributed to such publications as the Ottawa Citizen, Maclean's magazine, The Globe and Mail, the Toronto Sun, Reader's Digest and the Global television network. He has also appeared in several international journals such as Indian Defense Review, Mayar Nemzet and Al Jazeera. In 2006, Taylor presented to the University of Western Ontario his Clissold Lecture titled From Belgrade to Baghdad. Taylor appears regularly in Canadian media as a military expert and analyst.

In 2004, Taylor and a Turkish colleague Zeynep Tugrul were kidnapped in Iraq by Ansar al-Islam, a radical Islamist group and held for five days. His release generated a wave of international media coverage and he returned to Iraq in 2005, briefing the U.S soldiers stationed there on the Turkmen people of Iraq.

== Early years of Esprit de Corps ==
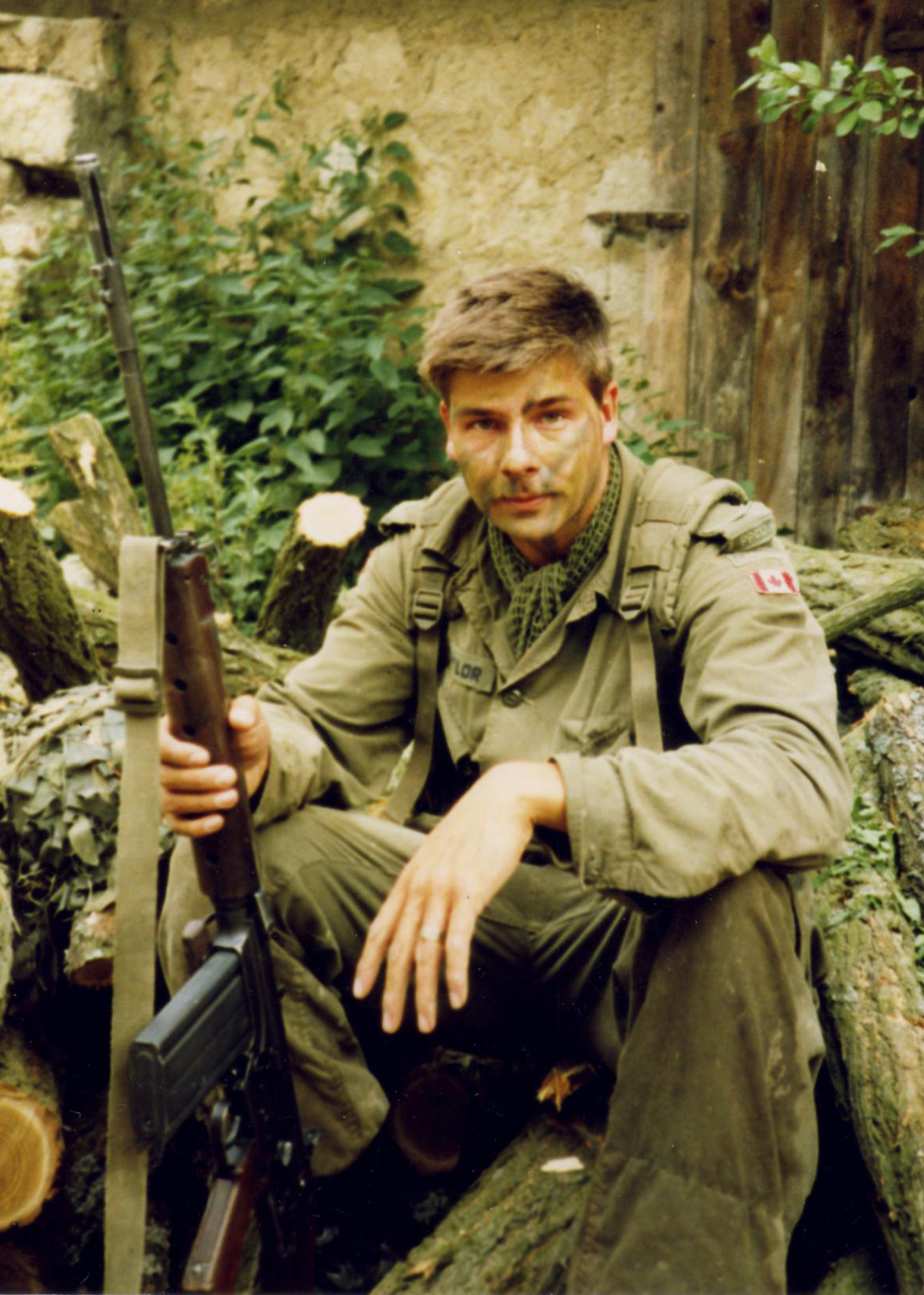
Scott Taylor in Germany in 1984.

Taylor's Canadian military magazine, Esprit de Corps, was first conceived of as an in-flight magazine for the Canadian Air Force, after Taylor and his wife Katherine discovered that Canadian Air Force planes lacked any on-board entertainment system or reading material. Their original concept was to utilize the military passengers who normally used the airlines to attract advertisers who wished to promote their products to Canadian Forces personnel.

After struggling to have his proposal accepted by the Canadian Forces, Taylor was able to secure national advertisers for the publication; corporations who had large budgets and could afford to advertise in their magazine Esprit de Corps, which was first published as an illustration-oriented magazine, with small articles and more entertainment-oriented content.

Due to the collapse of the Soviet Union and the Canadian government’s subsequent downsizing of its military expenditure, the Canadian Forces were experiencing cutbacks and changing the way in which its personnel would be transported. This affected Esprit de Corps drastically, as Canadian Forces personnel would now be transported via flights chartered by Air Canada. Because of the loss of its Canadian Air Force distribution and the cost-cutting atmosphere of the military community, Taylor and his wife decided to convert their magazine to a newsstand monthly.

The new magazine would feature mainly current military news and Canadian military history. The magazine continued to retain its seat-back distribution with Air Canada military charters and Taylor began to hire staff in order to help fill their new eighty-four page format.

In 1991, Esprit de Corps ran a controversial article, in which they interviewed the recently resigned vice-Admiral Chuck Thomas, recognizing and supporting Thomas, who had claimed that the Canadian Forces were not properly prepared for the future. As a result, the Department of National Defence ordered Air Canada to cease distribution of Esprit de Corps aboard their military charter flights. The DND’s decision was later reversed when Taylor threatened to issue a press release detailing corruption involving the DND official magazine Canadian Defence Quarterly.

== 2004 Kidnapping and Release ==
On September 7, 2004, Taylor and Turkish journalist Zeynep Tugrul, who works for the Turkish newspaper Sabah, arrived in Iraq to report on the Invasion of Iraq by the United States Military. Their reporting brought them to the city of Tal Afar in the predominantly Turkmen North, where the U.S was on the verge of major action against mujahedeen fighters. At a quarter past 7:00 on September 7, Taylor and Zeynep met with an Iraqi police checkpoint, planning to get directions to their contact in Tal Afar, Doctor Jashar. They were directed to a waiting car filled with masked gunmen, whom they believed to be Iraqi Special Forces.

They were driven by the masked gunmen to a resistance safe house, where they were kidnapped by Ansar al-Islam, a radical Islamist group and accused of being spies. Scott and Zeynep were held captive for five days by the Mujahedeen in which they were transported to numerous resistance sites, tortured for information, threatened with execution and continually beaten.

On September 12, Mujahedeen agents threw Taylor into an awaiting cab in northern Iraq with next to no money and abruptly released him, having negotiated a release with the Iraqi Turkmen Front and Zeynep Tugrul, who had been released earlier. His release created a wave of international media attention, granting him interviews in which he told the story of his kidnapping.

== Family ==
Taylor currently lives in Ottawa, Ontario with wife Katherine and son Kirk. He works at Esprit de Corps office as the publisher. He also plays for the Esprit de Corps Commando's hockey team as a right winger.

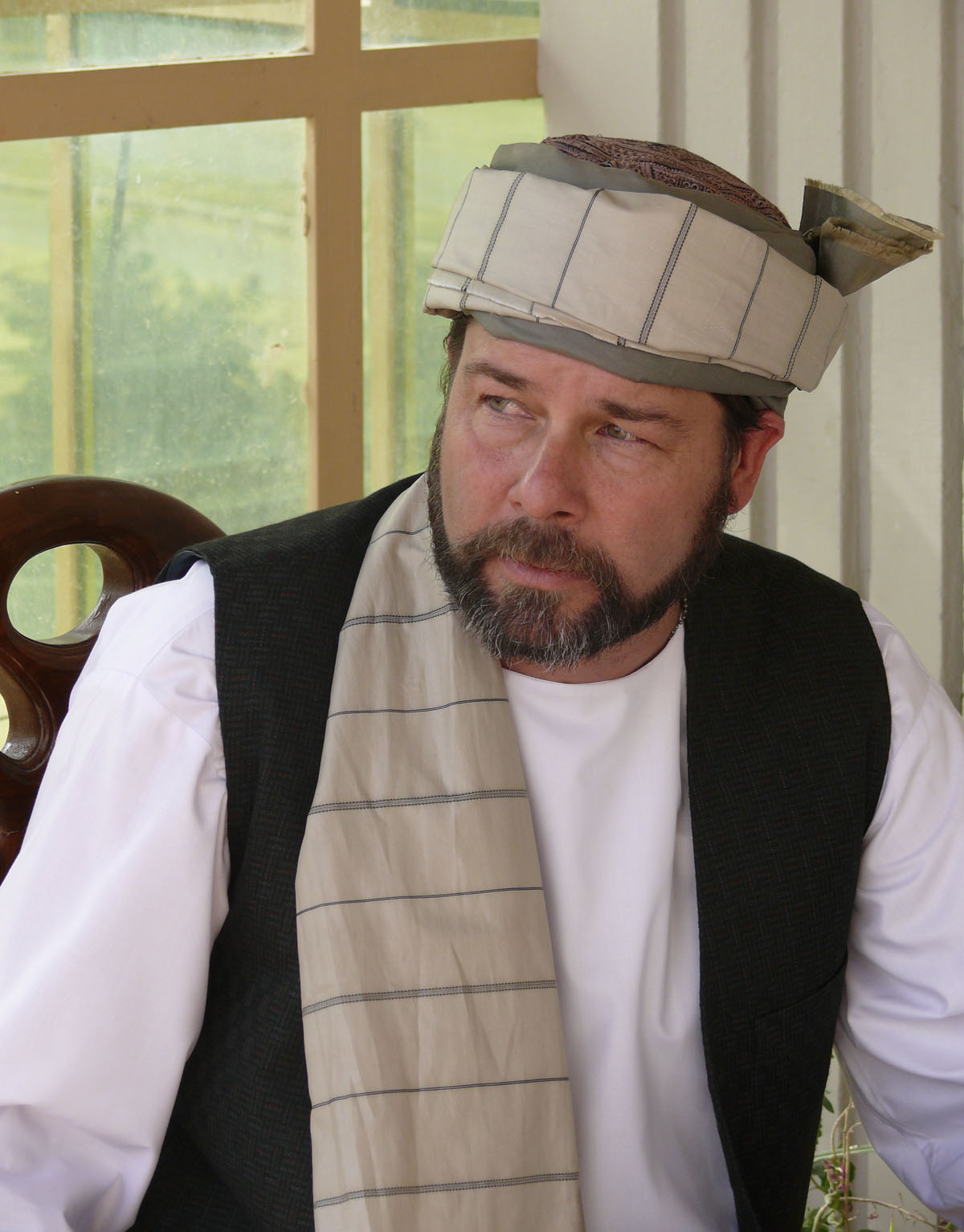
Scott Taylor in Kandahar in 2008, wearing turban.

== Books ==
Taylor has authored several books during his career:

Year	Titles	ISBN
1997	Tarnished Brass: Crime and Corruption in the Canadian Military	ISBN 1895555930
1998	Tested Mettle: Canada’s Peacekeepers at War	ISBN 1895896088
2000	Inat: Images of Serbia and the Kosovo Conflict	ISBN 189589610X
2002	Diary of an Uncivil War: The Violent Aftermath of the Kosovo Conflict	ISBN 1895896207
2003	Spinning on the Axis of Evil: America's War against Iraq	ISBN 1895896223
2004	Among the 'Others': the forgotten Turkmen of Iraq	ISBN 1895896266
2008	Unembedded: Two Decades of Maverick War Reporting	ISBN 9781553652922
2010	Unreconciled Differences: Turkey Armenia and Azerbaijan	ISBN 9781895896381

Taylor has also starred in and been the subject of several documentaries:

== Documentaries ==
Year	Titles	Subject
1999	Yugoslavia: the Avoidable War	a documentary that explores Western countries involvement during the war in Yugoslavia.
2005	Passionate Eye: Reporters in Iraq	The kidnapping of journalists in Iraq and the impact that is having on reporting in Iraq.
2009	National Geographic's Locked Up Abroad: Iraq	A docudrama in which Taylor recounts the events of his kidnapping by insurgents.
2009	Myths for Profit	a dramatic exposé documentary which explores Canada’s role in the industries of war and peace.
2010	If I Should Fall	a documentary about the life and death of Trooper Marc Diab of The Royal Canadian Dragoons who was killed in Afghanistan when his vehicle struck an IED.
2010	Afghanistan: Outside the Wire	a documentary in which Taylor travels throughout Afghanistan as a civilian, learning the civilian' side of the Afghanistan war.
2010	The Weight of Chains	a documentary analyzing the break-up of Yugoslavia and the part played by the United States, NATO and the European Union
2011	From Belgrade to Baghdad	A documentary about Taylor's military journalism career, following him from his reporting in the Balkans to the war in Iraq.
2011	F-35 Politics of Procurement	Taylor looks at the Canadian governments project to acquire new fighter planes to replace their CF-18's
2013	Homecoming: The Casualties of War	An in-depth look at the challenges faced by soldiers returning from Afghanistan and families of the fallen, particularly "invisible wounds" like PTSD and Survivor guilt.
