= Low Rebellion =

Canadian tax revolt

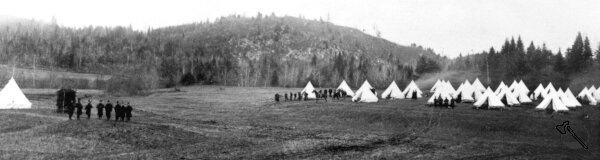
- Militia encamped in Low
Date	November 13–20, 1895
Location	Low, Quebec, Canada
Result	Government victory

Belligerents
Government	Local residents

Commanders and leaders
	Edward McSheffrey

Strength
82 men from the Ottawa Field Battery and the Princess Louise Dragoon Guards; 10+ local police	200 civilians

The Low Rebellion was an 1895 tax revolt by approximately 200 Irish settlers in he Gatineau Hills of Low, Quebec, who had refused to pay taxes to the federal Canadian government over the past fifteen years.

On 13 November 1895, ran the local police out of town, along with a bailiff they held hostage for two days, and the county treasurer.

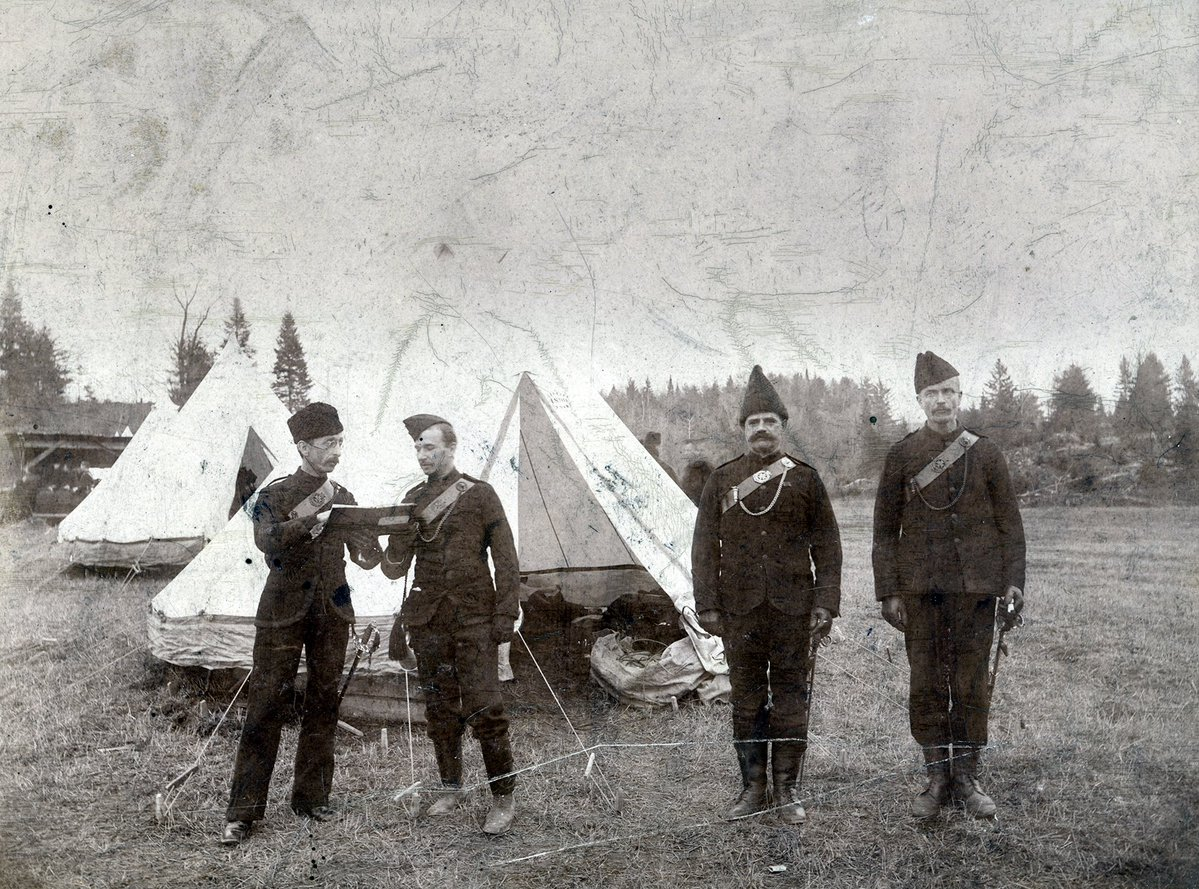
Militia during the Low Rebellion

82 soldiers from the Ottawa Field Battery and Princess Louise Dragoon Guards were deployed against the rebels on 17 November, and on 20 November they departed for Ottawa, having convinced the residents that they could not avoid paying their taxes.

One of the rebellion leaders, Edward McSheffrey, later became the mayor.
