= 6th Duke of Connaught's Royal Canadian Hussars =

- Active: 1855–1958
- Country: Canada
- Branch: Canadian Militia (1855–1940); Canadian Army (1940–1958)
- Type: Hussars
- Role: Cavalry; Armoured reconnaissance
- Size: One regiment
- Part of: Non-Permanent Active Militia (1855–1940); Royal Canadian Armoured Corps (1940–1958)
- Garrison/HQ: Montreal, Quebec
- Engagements: Fenian Raids; First World War; Second World War
- Battle honours: See #Battle honours

The 6th Duke of Connaught's Royal Canadian Hussars was a cavalry and later armoured regiment of the Non-Permanent Active Militia of the Canadian Militia and later the Canadian Army. Based in Montreal, the regiment traced its origins to independent cavalry troops formed in 1855 and was among the oldest cavalry formations in Quebec.

Originally organized as a cavalry regiment during the era of horse-mounted militia units, the regiment later transitioned into mechanized and armoured roles during the 20th century. In 1958, it amalgamated with the 17th Duke of York's Royal Canadian Hussars to form The Royal Canadian Hussars (Montreal).

The regiment served during the Fenian Raids, contributed personnel to the First World War, and later formed part of Canada's armoured reserve structure during the Second World War.

== History ==
=== Origins ===
The regiment's origins dated to 1855, when independent volunteer cavalry troops were formed in Montreal during a period of militia expansion in the Province of Canada. These mounted militia units reflected the continuing importance of cavalry for reconnaissance, dispatch, ceremonial duties, and rapid local defence in British North America during the mid-19th century.

On 14 November 1879, the regiment formally originated in Montreal as the 6th Provisional Regiment of Cavalry. The regiment formed part of the growing Canadian militia system established after Canadian Confederation and amid concerns over border security and American expansionism following the Fenian Raids.

The unit was redesignated as the 6th Regiment of Cavalry on 18 September 1885. On 20 June 1890, it received the designation 6th Regiment of Cavalry “Duke of Connaught's Royal Canadian Hussars”, honouring Prince Arthur, Duke of Connaught and Strathearn, who served as Governor General of Canada from 1911 to 1916 and maintained longstanding ties to Canadian militia cavalry units.

On 1 January 1893, the regiment was redesignated as the 6th “Duke of Connaught's Royal Canadian Hussars”.

=== Amalgamation with the 5th Dragoons ===
On 1 June 1901, the regiment amalgamated with the 5th Dragoons, a cavalry regiment originating in Cookshire, Quebec. The combined unit adopted the title 6th Duke of Connaught's Royal Canadian Hussars.

The amalgamation reflected broader efforts within the Canadian militia to consolidate cavalry formations while preserving traditional regimental identities and regional recruiting bases.

=== Transition to mechanization ===
Like many cavalry regiments in Canada and elsewhere in the British Empire, the regiment underwent gradual mechanization during the interwar period as mounted cavalry declined in military importance.

On 15 December 1936, the regiment amalgamated with the 1st Armoured Car Regiment and was redesignated as the 6th Duke of Connaught's Royal Canadian Hussars (Armoured Car).

The 1st Armoured Car Regiment itself had originated on 1 June 1919 as the 1st Motor Machine Gun Brigade, CMGC, a mechanized formation reflecting the growing importance of armoured mobility after the First World War.

The amalgamation marked the regiment's transition from traditional horse cavalry to mechanized reconnaissance and armoured operations within the evolving structure of the Canadian Army.

=== Second World War ===
During the Second World War, the regiment formed part of Canada's reserve armoured forces. On 27 February 1941, it was redesignated as the 2nd (Reserve) Regiment, 6th Duke of Connaught's Royal Canadian Hussars (Armoured Car).

Shortly afterward, on 1 April 1941, it became the 15th (Reserve) Armoured Regiment (6th Duke of Connaught's Royal Canadian Hussars).

Although the regiment itself remained in Canada as a reserve formation, its personnel contributed to the broader wartime expansion of Canadian armoured forces. Members of the regiment served in training, home defence, and reinforcement capacities during the war.

=== Postwar years and amalgamation ===
On 4 February 1949, the regiment was redesignated as the 6th Duke of Connaught's Royal Canadian Hussars (15th Armoured Regiment).

The regiment reverted to the title 6th Duke of Connaught's Royal Canadian Hussars on 19 May 1958.

On 16 September 1958, the regiment amalgamated with the 17th Duke of York's Royal Canadian Hussars to form The Royal Canadian Hussars (Montreal). The amalgamation combined two of Montreal's oldest cavalry regiments into a single reserve armoured regiment within the Royal Canadian Armoured Corps.

== Lineage ==
=== 6th Duke of Connaught's Royal Canadian Hussars ===
- Originated on 14 November 1879 in Montreal as the 6th Provisional Regiment of Cavalry
- Redesignated on 18 September 1885 as the 6th Regiment of Cavalry
- Redesignated on 20 June 1890 as the 6th Regiment of Cavalry “Duke of Connaught's Royal Canadian Hussars”
- Redesignated on 1 January 1893 as the 6th “Duke of Connaught's Royal Canadian Hussars”
- Amalgamated on 1 June 1901 with the 5th Dragoons and redesignated as the 6th Duke of Connaught's Royal Canadian Hussars
- Amalgamated on 15 December 1936 with the 1st Armoured Car Regiment and redesignated as the 6th Duke of Connaught's Royal Canadian Hussars (Armoured Car)
- Redesignated on 27 February 1941 as the 2nd (Reserve) Regiment, 6th Duke of Connaught's Royal Canadian Hussars (Armoured Car)
- Redesignated on 1 April 1941 as the 15th (Reserve) Armoured Regiment (6th Duke of Connaught's Royal Canadian Hussars)
- Redesignated on 4 February 1949 as the 6th Duke of Connaught's Royal Canadian Hussars (15th Armoured Regiment)
- Redesignated on 19 May 1958 as the 6th Duke of Connaught's Royal Canadian Hussars
- Amalgamated on 16 September 1958 with the 17th Duke of York's Royal Canadian Hussars to form The Royal Canadian Hussars (Montreal).

=== 5th Dragoons ===
- Originated on 30 November 1877 in Cookshire, Quebec as the 5th Provisional Regiment of Cavalry
- Redesignated on 21 May 1886 as the 5th Regiment of Cavalry
- Redesignated on 1 January 1893 as the 5th Dragoons
- Amalgamated on 1 June 1901 with the 6th "Duke of Connaught's Royal Canadian Hussars" and redesignated as the 6th Duke of Connaught's Royal Canadian Hussars.

=== 1st Armoured Car Regiment ===
- Originated on 1 June 1919 in Montreal as the 1st Motor Machine Gun Brigade, CMGC
- Redesignated on 1 October 1936 as the 1st Armoured Car Regiment
- Amalgamated on 15 December 1936 with the 6th Duke of Connaught's Royal Canadian Hussars and redesignated as the 6th Duke of Connaught's Royal Canadian Hussars (Armoured Car).

== Perpetuations ==
- 1st Canadian Motor Machine Gun Brigade, CEF

== Alliances ==
- United Kingdom – 8th King's Royal Irish Hussars (1936–1958)

== Battle honours ==
The regiment perpetuated the battle honours of the Canadian Expeditionary Force formations with which it was historically associated.

- Mount Sorrel
- Somme, 1916, '18
- Flers-Courcelette
- Thiepval
- Arras, 1917, '18
- Vimy, 1917
- Hill 70
- Ypres, 1917
- Passchendaele
- Baupaume, 1918
- Rosières
- Avre
- Amiens
- Scarpe, 1918
- Drocourt–Quéant
- Hindenburg Line
- Canal du Nord
- Cambrai, 1918
- Valenciennes
- Sambre
- France and Flanders, 1915–18

== Notable members ==
- Prince Arthur, Duke of Connaught and Strathearn
- Brigadier-General Charles Allan Smart CMG
- Ben Weider OC CQ CD
- Lieutenant-Colonel George Harold Baker
- Chaplain John Macpherson Almond CMG CBE

== See also ==
- The Royal Canadian Hussars (Montreal)
- List of regiments of cavalry of the Canadian Militia (1900–1920)
- Royal Canadian Armoured Corps
