= Bing Coughlin =

Canadian cartoonist (1905–2000)

William Garnet "Bing" Coughlin
- Born: October 7, 1905 Ottawa, Ontario, Canada
- Died: February 12, 2000 (aged 94) Springfield, Pennsylvania, United States
- Area: Cartoonist
- Notable works: "Herbie"
- Awards: MBE

William Garnet "Bing" Coughlin (October 7, 1905 – February 12, 2000) was a Canadian World War II cartoonist. His mother remarried after his father's death, and the family moved to Philadelphia in 1923, where he enrolled in the Pennsylvania School of Industrial Art. After graduation, he went into advertising art. Coughlin met and married his wife Margaret (Peg) White in 1929.

Soon after the outbreak of World War II, Coughlin returned to Canada to serve in the Canadian Army with the 4th Princess Louise Dragoon Guards – also known as the "Plugs" or the "Piddly-Gees". As a sergeant, he participated in the invasion of Sicily and fought for four months in the Italian campaign. It was during this campaign that his cartoons began to appear in the soldiers' magazine, "The Maple Leaf." In 1944, the troops elected the popular artist as "Canadian Man of the Year."

Like America's Bill Mauldin, whose military cartoons in the Stars and Stripes made him the unofficial voice of the ordinary "dogface", Bing Coughlin became the spokesman for the Canadian enlisted man. Featured as "This Army", his cartoons showed life as it was behind the lines and up at the front, always taking the view of the common soldier. As often as not, the officers were shown less sympathetically than the Germans. Mauldin created Willy & Joe. Coughlin's ubiquitous Canadian foot soldier was "Herbie". An unnamed French Canadian enlisted man with toque and mustache also appears with Herbie in many cartoons.

In 1946, the Governor General of Canada made Bing Coughlin a Member of the Order of the British Empire (MBE) for his cartooning during the war.

Two volumes of "This Army" were published by "The Maple Leaf" in Rome, in 1944 and 1945. A year after the war, a new collection of "Bing" Coughlin's wartime cartoons was published by Thomas Nelson and Sons, Canada. Called simply "Herbie!" the 1946 edition was reprinted in 1959, on the 20th anniversary of the start of World War II. A modern collection of "Herbie" was published by Algrove Publishing, Almonte Ontario, in 2008.

In contrast to Bill Mauldin, Bing Coughlin stayed clear of politics. Mauldin continued a successful career as a newspaper political cartoonist after the war, while Coughlin returned to commercial art. For a number of years he worked for the Canadian National Exhibition, but in 1950 Coughlin returned to Philadelphia as a designer of exhibits.
