= Buci, Visoko =

Buci
- Village
- Location within Bosnia and Herzegovina
- Coordinates: 43.9623809°N 18.172395°E
- Country: Bosnia and Herzegovina
- Entity: Federation of Bosnia and Herzegovina
- Canton: Zenica-Doboj
- Municipality: Visoko

Area
  - Total: 0.67 sq mi (1.73 km^{2})

Population (2013)
  - Total: 418
  - Density: 626/sq mi (242/km^{2})
- Time zone: UTC+1 (CET)
  - Summer (DST): UTC+2 (CEST)

Buci is a village in the municipality of Visoko, Bosnia and Herzegovina.

== Demographics ==
According to the 2013 census, its population was 418.

Ethnicity in 2013
Ethnicity	Number	Percentage
Bosniaks	408	97.6%
Serbs	1	0.2%
other/undeclared	9	2.2%
Total	418	100%
