= 5th Dragoons (Canada) =

- Active: 1856 - 1901
- Country: Canada
- Branch: Canadian Militia
- Type: Dragoons
- Role: Regiment of Cavalry
- Part of: Non-Permanent Active Militia
- Garrison/HQ: Cookshire, Quebec

The 5th Dragoons was a cavalry regiment of the Non-Permanent Active Militia of the Canadian Militia (now the Canadian Army). In 1901, the regiment was amalgamated with the 6th Duke of Connaught's Royal Canadian Hussars – today now part of The Royal Canadian Hussars (Montreal).

== Lineage ==
=== 5th Dragoons ===
- Originated on 30 November 1877, in Cookshire, Quebec, as the 5th Provisional Regiment of Cavalry.
- Redesignated on 21 May 1886, as the 5th Regiment of Cavalry.
- Redesignated on 1 January 1893, as the 5th Dragoons.
- Amalgamated on 1 June 1901, with the 6th "Duke of Connaught's Royal Canadian Hussars" and Redesignated as the 6th Duke of Connaught's Royal Canadian Hussars.

== History ==
The 5th Dragoons were first Organized on 7 February 1856, when The Cookshire Volunteer Militia Troop of Cavalry was authorized to be formed in Cookshire, Quebec as an independent cavalry troop.

On 30 November 1877, the troop was Reorganized into a full regiment and Redesignated as the 5th Provisional Regiment of Cavalry. Troops were located at Cookshire, Sherbrooke, Stanstead, Compton and Sutton.

The regiment was Redesignated on 21 May 1886, as the 5th Regiment of Cavalry and for the final time on 1 January 1893, as the 5th Dragoons.

On 1 June 1901, the 5th Dragoons were Amalgamated with 6th Duke of Connaught's Royal Canadian Hussars. Today, both form part of The Royal Canadian Hussars (Montreal).

== Organization ==
5th Provisional Regiment of Cavalry (30 November 1877)

- Regimental Headquarters (Cookshire, Quebec)
- No. 1 Troop (Cookshire, Quebec) (First raised on 7 February 1856, as The Cookshire Volunteer Militia Troop of Cavalry)
- No. 2 Troop (Sherbrooke, Quebec) (First raised on 13 November 1860, as the 1st Troop of Volunteer Militia Cavalry of Sherbrooke)
- No. 3 Troop (Stanstead County, Quebec) (First raised on 23 February 1872, as The Stanstead Troop of Cavalry)
- No. 4 Troop (Compton, Quebec) (First raised on 23 February 1872, as The Compton Troop of Cavalry)

== See also ==
- List of regiments of cavalry of the Canadian Militia (1900–1920)
