= Bapaume 1918 (Battle honour) =

Bapaume 1918 was a battle honour awarded to units of the British and Imperial Armies that took part in one or more of the following engagements in the Great War:

- First Battle of Bapaume, 24–25 Mar 1918
- Second Battle of Bapaume, 21 Aug–3 Sep 1918
