= 4th Hussars of Canada =

- Active: 1855–1936
- Country: Canada
- Branch: Canadian Militia
- Type: Hussars
- Role: Cavalry
- Size: One Regiment
- Part of: Non-Permanent Active Militia
- Garrison/HQ: Kingston, Ontario
- Mottos: Latin: Pro Aris Et Focis, lit. 'For Hearth and Home'
- Engagements: First World War

The 4th Hussars of Canada was a light cavalry regiment of the Non-Permanent Active Militia of the Canadian Militia (now the Canadian Army). In 1936, the regiment was Amalgamated with The Princess Louise Dragoon Guards to form the 4th Princess Louise Dragoon Guards (currently on the Supplementary Order of Battle).

== Lineage ==
=== 4th Hussars of Canada ===
- Originated on 30 April 1875, in Kingston, Ontario, as the 4th Provisional Regiment of Cavalry.
- Redesignated on 7 May 1886, as the 4th Regiment of Cavalry.
- Redesignated on 1 January 1893, as the 4th Hussars.
- Redesignated on 1 March 1932, as the 4th Hussars of Canada.
- Amalgamated on 15 December 1936, with The Princess Louise Dragoon Guards and redesignated as the 4th Princess Louise Dragoon Guards.

== History ==
=== Early history ===
Starting around in 1855, several independent troops of cavalry in the Province of Canada's volunteer militia were first formed in and around the Kingston region.

On 30 April 1875, these troops were finally grouped together when the 4th Provisional Regiment of Cavalry was authorized. The Regiment’s Headquarters was located at Kingston and had troops in Kingston, Napanee, Loughborough and Picton, Ontario.

The regiment was redesignated on 7 May 1886, as the 4th Regiment of Cavalry and again on 1 January 1893, as the 4th Hussars.

=== First World War ===
On 6 August 1914, details of the 4th Hussars were placed on active service for local protective duty.

During the First World War, the 4th Hussars along with The Princess Louise Dragoon Guards helped raise the 8th Regiment, Canadian Mounted Rifles for service with the Canadian Expeditionary Force. The 8th CMR however wouldn’t serve as a complete unit and was broken up to provide reinforcements to the 4th Canadian Mounted Rifles.

=== 1920s–1930s ===
After the First World War, the 4th Hussars continued to serve as a militia cavalry unit in the Kingston area. In March 1932, the regiment was Redesignated as the 4th Hussars of Canada.

On 15 December 1936, as a result of that year's Canadian Militia reorganization, the 4th Hussars of Canada were amalgamated with The Princess Louise Dragoon Guards to form the 4th Princess Louise Dragoon Guards.

== Structure ==
=== 4th Provisional Regiment of Cavalry (30 April 1875) ===
- No. 1 Troop (Kingston, Ontario) (first raised on 20 September 1855, as the 1st Frontenac Troop of Volunteer Militia Cavalry. Later redesignated on 28 August 1868, as the 1st Troop, Frontenac Squadron of Cavalry).
- No. 2 Troop (Napanee, Ontario) (first raised on 28 February 1856, as The Napanee Volunteer Militia Troop of Cavalry).
- No. 3 Troop (Loughborough, Ontario) (first raised on 20 September 1855, as the 2nd Frontenac Troop of Volunteer Militia Cavalry. Redesignated on 28 August 1868, as the 2nd Troop, Frontenac Squadron of Cavalry).
- No. 4 Troop (Picton, Ontario) (first raised on 23 May 1872, as The Picton Troop of Volunteer Militia Cavalry).

== Alliances ==
- United Kingdom - 4th Queen's Own Hussars (Until 1936)
