= Cookshire, Quebec =

Coordinates: 45.413100°N 71.626610°W

Cookshire is an unincorporated community in Cookshire-Eaton, Quebec, Canada. It is recognized as a designated place by Statistics Canada.

== Demographics ==
In the 2021 Census of Population conducted by Statistics Canada, Cookshire had a population of 950 living in 397 of its 414 total private dwellings, a change of -7% from its 2016 population of 1,021. With a land area of 2.02 km^{2} (0.78 sq mi), it had a population density of 470.3/km^{2} (1,218.1/sq mi) in 2021.

== See also ==
- List of communities in Quebec
- List of designated places in Quebec
