= Canadian Army Journal =

- Discipline: Military
- Language: English and French

Publication details
- History: 1947–present
- Publisher: Canadian Army
- Frequency: Quarterly

Standard abbreviations
- ISO 4: Can. Army J.

Indexing
- ISSN: 1713-773X
- OCLC no.: 57191734

Links
- Journal homepage

The Canadian Army Journal (French: Le Journal de l’Armée canadienne) abbreviated as CAJ (French: JAC), is a quarterly peer-reviewed academic journal published by the Canadian Army in English and French. It was established in 1947.

== History ==
The journal first adopted its current name in 1947 with Jack G. DeProse as the founding editor-in-chief. Preceded by the Canadian Army Training Memorandum (an English-only publication published monthly from 1941 to 1947), the bilingual army journal ceased publication in June 1965 amidst reform within the Department of National Defence seeking to unify the periodical publications of the Canadian Armed Forces. In 1965 the Canadian Army Journal, the Navy's The Crowsnest and the Air Force's The Roundel were merged to form the Canadian Forces Sentinel, which changed its name to simply Sentinel in 1973 and then ceased publication in 1994.

The current Canadian Army Journal was preceded from 1980 to 1993 by the "roughly biannual" Canadian Army Doctrine Bulletin. The army's own quarterly bilingual journal was officially relaunched as the Army Doctrine and Training Bulletin in August 1998 and then returned to its historic name in 2004.

=== Past and Current Editors ===
Years active	Editor
1947-1965	Mr. J.G. 'Jack' DeProse
1966-1998	CAJ Inactive
1998-2003^{1}	Captain John R. Grodzinski, CD
2003-2004	Major Shane B. Schreiber, CD
2004-2005	Major Ted H. Dillenberg, CD
2005-2015	Major Andrew B. Godefroy, CD
2015-2018	Major Chris Young, CD
2018-2019	LCol Ron Bell, CD
2019-2020	Major John Bosso, CD
2020–2022	LCol Michael A. Rostek, CD, PhD, APF
2022-2025	Dr. Aditi Malhotra
2025–Present	Mr. Frédéric Dion

^{1} Published under the title "Army Doctrine and Training Bulletin" until 2004
