= List of infantry battalions in the Canadian Expeditionary Force =

During the First World War, the Canadian Army authorized the formation of 260 infantry battalions to serve in the Canadian Expeditionary Force. Only fifty-three of these battalions ever reached the front lines. The remaining battalions, most often upon arrival in England, were broken up and primarily absorbed into a reserve battalion. In addition to the numbered battalions, there were two named battalions. Several regiments of Canadian Mounted Rifles (mounted infantry) were converted to regular infantry battalions and served in the Canadian Corps.

Besides the infantry, there were other Canadian combat units in the CEF, including cavalry and mounted infantry regiments (in particular the Canadian Cavalry Brigade), artillery brigades, machine gun battalions such as the Canadian Automobile Machine Gun Brigade, the Canadian Corps Cyclist Battalion and tank battalions such as the 1st Canadian Tank Battalion and the 2nd Canadian Tank Battalion.

The infantry battalions in bold type served in the field.

Infantry battalions of the Canadian Expeditionary Force
Battalion	Authorized	Disbanded	Perpetuation
**1st Battalion, Canadian Mounted Rifles**	7 November 1914	15 November 1920	The North Saskatchewan Regiment and 118th Medium Battery, RCA
**2nd Battalion, Canadian Mounted Rifles**	7 November 1914	6 November 1920	The British Columbia Dragoons
**4th Battalion, Canadian Mounted Rifles**	7 November 1914	6 November 1920	Governor General's Horse Guards
**5th Battalion, Canadian Mounted Rifles**	7 November 1914	30 August 1920	The Sherbrooke Hussars
**The Royal Canadian Regiment**	21 December 1883	Extant	
**Princess Patricia's Canadian Light Infantry**	10 August 1914	Extant	
**1st Battalion (Ontario Regiment), CEF**	10 August 1914	15 September 1920	The Royal Canadian Regiment
**2nd Battalion (Eastern Ontario Regiment), CEF**	10 August 1914	15 September 1920	Governor General's Foot Guards and 50th Field Artillery Regiment (The Prince of Wales Rangers), RCA
**3rd Battalion (Toronto Regiment), CEF**	10 August 1914	30 August 1920	The Queen's Own Rifles of Canada and The Royal Regiment of Canada
**4th Battalion (Central Ontario), CEF**	10 August 1914	30 August 1920	56th Field Artillery Regiment, RCA and The Royal Hamilton Light Infantry (Wentworth Regiment)
**5th Battalion (Western Cavalry), CEF**	10 August 1914	15 September 1920	The North Saskatchewan Regiment
6th Battalion (Fort Garrys), CEF	10 August 1914	5 April 1918	12th Manitoba Dragoons
**7th Battalion (1st British Columbia), CEF**	10 August 1914	30 August 1920	The British Columbia Regiment (Duke of Connaught's Own)
**8th Battalion (90th Winnipeg Rifles), CEF**	10 August 1914	15 September 1920	The Royal Winnipeg Rifles
9th Battalion, CEF	10 August 1914	15 September 1917	The South Alberta Light Horse
**10th Battalion (Canadians), CEF**	10 August 1914	15 September 1920	The Royal Winnipeg Rifles and The Calgary Highlanders (10th Canadians)
11th Battalion, CEF	10 August 1914	12 October 1917	The Winnipeg Grenadiers
12th Battalion, CEF	10 August 1914	30 August 1920	The Royal New Brunswick Regiment and The Royal Rifles of Canada
**13th Battalion (Royal Highlanders of Canada), CEF**	1 September 1914	15 September 1920	The Black Watch (Royal Highland Regiment) of Canada
**14th Battalion (Royal Montreal Regiment), CEF**	1 September 1914	30 August 1920	The Royal Montreal Regiment
**15th Battalion (48th Highlanders of Canada), CEF**	1 September 1914	30 August 1920	48th Highlanders of Canada
**16th Battalion (Canadian Scottish), CEF**	1 September 1914	30 August 1920	The Canadian Scottish Regiment (Princess Mary's)
17th Battalion (Nova Scotia Highlanders), CEF	19 September 1914	21 May 1917	The Nova Scotia Highlanders
**18th Battalion (Western Ontario), CEF**	7 November 1914	15 September 1920	The Essex and Kent Scottish
**19th Battalion (Central Ontario), CEF**	7 November 1914	15 September 1920	The Argyll and Sutherland Highlanders of Canada (Princess Louise's)
**20th Battalion (Central Ontario), CEF**	7 November 1914	30 August 1920	The Queen's York Rangers (1st American Regiment) (RCAC)
**21st Battalion (Eastern Ontario), CEF**	7 November 1914	30 August 1920	The Princess of Wales' Own Regiment
**22nd Battalion (French Canadian), CEF**	7 November 1914	15 September 1920	Royal 22nd Regiment
23rd Reserve Battalion, CEF	21 October 1914	30 August 1920	The Royal Montreal Regiment
**24th Battalion (Victoria Rifles), CEF**	7 November 1914	15 September 1920	Victoria Rifles of Canada
**25th Battalion (Nova Scotia Rifles), CEF**	7 November 1914	15 September 1920	The Nova Scotia Highlanders
**26th Battalion (New Brunswick), CEF**	7 November 1914	30 August 1920	The Royal New Brunswick Regiment
**27th Battalion (City of Winnipeg), CEF**	7 November 1914	15 September 1920	The Royal Winnipeg Rifles
**28th Battalion (Northwest), CEF**	7 November 1914	30 August 1920	The Royal Regina Rifles
**29th Battalion (Vancouver), CEF**	7 November 1914	30 August 1920	The British Columbia Regiment (Duke of Connaught's Own)
30th Battalion, CEF	27 October 1914	1 September 1917	The British Columbia Regiment (Duke of Connaught's Own)
**31st Battalion (Alberta), CEF**	7 November 1914	30 August 1920	The North Alberta Regiment and The South Alberta Light Horse
32nd Battalion, CEF	3 November 1914	1 September 1917	12th Manitoba Dragoons
33rd Battalion, CEF	7 November 1914	17 July 1917	The Royal Canadian Regiment
34th Battalion, CEF	7 November 1914	17 July 1917	The Royal Highland Fusiliers of Canada
35th Battalion, CEF	7 November 1914	8 December 1917	The Queen's York Rangers (1st American Regiment) (RCAC)
36th Battalion, CEF	7 November 1914	15 September 1917	56th Field Artillery Regiment, RCA
37th Battalion (Northern Ontario), CEF	7 November 1914	21 May 1917	The Lorne Scots (Peel, Dufferin and Halton Regiment)
**38th Battalion (Ottawa), CEF**	7 November 1914	30 August 1920	The Cameron Highlanders of Ottawa (Duke of Edinburgh's Own)
39th Battalion, CEF	7 November 1914	17 July 1917	The Hastings and Prince Edward Regiment
40th Battalion (Nova Scotia), CEF	7 November 1914	17 July 1917	The Halifax Rifles (RCAC)
41st Battalion (French Canadian), CEF	7 November 1914	15 September 1920	Le Régiment de Maisonneuve
**42nd Battalion (Royal Highlanders of Canada), CEF**	7 November 1914	15 September 1920	The Black Watch (Royal Highland Regiment) of Canada
**43rd Battalion (Cameron Highlanders of Canada), CEF**	7 November 1914	30 August 1920	The Queen's Own Cameron Highlanders of Canada
**44th Battalion (Manitoba), CEF, later 44th Battalion (New Brunswick), CEF**	7 November 1914	15 September 1920	The Royal Winnipeg Rifles
45th Battalion (Manitoba), CEF	7 November 1914	17 July 1917	26th Field Artillery Regiment, RCA
**46th Battalion (South Saskatchewan), CEF**	7 November 1914	30 August 1920	The Saskatchewan Dragoons
**47th Battalion (British Columbia), CEF, later 47th Battalion (Western Ontario), CEF**	7 November 1914	30 August 1920	The Royal Westminster Regiment
**48th Battalion (British Columbia), CEF, later 3rd Pioneer Battalion, CEF**	7 November 1914	30 August 1920	The Canadian Scottish Regiment (Princess Mary's)
**49th Battalion (Edmonton Regiment), CEF**	7 November 1914	15 September 1920	The Loyal Edmonton Regiment (4th Battalion, Princess Patricia's Canadian Light Infantry)
**50th Battalion (Calgary), CEF**	7 November 1914	30 August 1920	The King's Own Calgary Regiment (RCAC)
51st Battalion (Edmonton), CEF	7 November 1914	15 September 1920	The Loyal Edmonton Regiment (4th Battalion, Princess Patricia's Canadian Light Infantry)
**52nd Battalion (New Ontario), CEF**	7 November 1914	30 August 1920	The Lake Superior Scottish Regiment
53rd Battalion (Northern Saskatchewan), CEF	7 November 1914	12 October 1917	The North Saskatchewan Regiment
**54th Battalion (Kootenay), CEF, later 54th Battalion (Central Ontario), CEF**	7 November 1914	30 August 1920	24th Field Artillery Regiment, RCA
55th Battalion (New Brunswick & Prince Edward Island), CEF	7 November 1914	21 May 1917	The Royal New Brunswick Regiment
56th Battalion (Calgary), CEF	7 November 1914	15 September 1917	The Calgary Highlanders (10th Canadians)
57th Battalion (Canadien-Français), CEF	20 April 1915	11 April 1918	Les Voltigeurs de Québec
**58th Battalion, CEF**	20 April 1915	15 September 1920	The Royal Regiment of Canada
59th Battalion (Ontario), CEF	20 April 1915	21 May 1917	The Princess of Wales' Own Regiment
**60th Battalion (Victoria Rifles of Canada), CEF**	20 April 1915	15 August 1918	Victoria Rifles of Canada
61st Battalion (Winnipeg), CEF	20 April 1915	17 July 1917	The Royal Winnipeg Rifles
62nd Battalion (British Columbia), CEF	20 April 1915	8 December 1917	The British Columbia Regiment (Duke of Connaught's Own)
63rd Battalion (Edmonton), CEF	20 April 1915	1 September 1917	The Loyal Edmonton Regiment (4th Battalion, Princess Patricia's Canadian Light Infantry)
64th Battalion, CEF	20 April 1915	27 July 1917	The Princess Louise Fusiliers
65th Battalion (Saskatchewan), CEF	20 April 1915	12 October 1917	The North Saskatchewan Regiment
66th Battalion (Edmonton Guards), CEF	20 April 1915	30 August 1920	The South Alberta Light Horse
67th Battalion (Western Scots), CEF	20 April 1915	30 August 1920	The Canadian Scottish Regiment (Princess Mary's)
68th Battalion (Regina), CEF	20 April 1915	21 May 1917	The Royal Regina Rifles
69th Battalion (Canadien-Français), CEF	10 July 1915	30 August 1920	Les Fusiliers Mont-Royal
70th Battalion, CEF	15 August 1915	4 August 1917	26th Field Battery, RCA
71st Battalion, CEF	1 April 1916	11 April 1918	The Royal Canadian Regiment
**72nd Battalion (Seaforth Highlanders of Canada), CEF**	10 July 1915	30 August 1920	The Seaforth Highlanders of Canada
**73rd Battalion (Royal Highlanders of Canada), CEF**	10 July 1915	19 April 1917	The Black Watch (Royal Highland Regiment) of Canada
74th Battalion, CEF	10 July 1915	15 September 1917	The Lorne Scots (Peel, Dufferin and Halton Regiment)
**75th Battalion (Mississauga), CEF**	10 July 1915	15 September 1920	The Toronto Scottish Regiment (Queen Elizabeth The Queen Mother's Own)
76th Battalion, CEF	10 July 1915	17 July 1917	The Lorne Scots (Peel, Dufferin and Halton Regiment)
77th Battalion (Ottawa), CEF	10 July 1915	22 September 1916	Governor General's Foot Guards
**78th Battalion (Winnipeg Grenadiers), CEF**	10 July 1915	15 September 1920	The Winnipeg Grenadiers
79th Battalion (Manitoba), CEF	10 July 1915	12 October 1917	26th Field Artillery Regiment, RCA
80th Battalion, CEF	10 July 1915	17 July 1917	The Hastings and Prince Edward Regiment
81st Battalion, CEF	10 July 1915	27 July 1917	The Lincoln and Welland Regiment
82nd Battalion, CEF	10 July 1915	21 May 1917	The Calgary Highlanders (10th Canadians)
83rd Battalion (Queen's Own Rifles of Canada), CEF	10 July 1915	21 May 1917	The Queen's Own Rifles of Canada
84th Battalion, CEF	10 July 1915	11 April 1918	The Toronto Scottish Regiment (Queen Elizabeth The Queen Mother's Own)
**85th Battalion (Nova Scotia Highlanders), CEF**	10 July 1915	15 September 1920	The Cape Breton Highlanders
86th Battalion (Machine Gun), CEF	22 December 1915	1 September 1917	The Royal Hamilton Light Infantry (Wentworth Regiment)
**87th Battalion (Canadian Grenadier Guards), CEF**	22 December 1915	30 August 1920	The Canadian Grenadier Guards
88th Battalion (Victoria Fusiliers), CEF	22 December 1915	1 September 1917	The Canada Scottish Regiment (Princess Mary's)
89th Battalion (Alberta), CEF	22 December 1915	21 May 1917	The King's Own Calgary Regiment (RCAC)
90th Battalion (Winnipeg Rifles), CEF	22 December 1915	1 September 1917	The Royal Winnipeg Rifles
91st (Elgin) Battalion, CEF	22 December 1915	21 May 1917	31 Combat Engineer Regiment (The Elgins)
92nd Battalion (48th Highlanders), CEF	30 July 1915	1 September 1917	48th Highlanders of Canada
93rd Battalion (Peterborough), CEF	22 December 1915	21 May 1917	50th Field Artillery Regiment (The Prince of Wales Rangers), RCA
94th Battalion (New Ontario), CEF	22 December 1915	27 July 1918	116th Independent Field Battery, RCA, and 16th/17th (Reserve) Medium Battery, RCA
95th Battalion, CEF	22 December 1915	17 July 1917	The Queen's Own Rifles of Canada
96th Battalion (Canadian Highlanders), CEF	22 December 1915	1 September 1917	The North Saskatchewan Regiment
97th Battalion (American Legion), CEF	22 December 1915	5 April 1918	Not perpetuated
98th Battalion (Lincoln & Welland), CEF	22 December 1915	17 July 1917	The Lincoln and Welland Regiment
99th Battalion (Essex), CEF	22 December 1915	1 September 1917	The Essex and Kent Scottish
100th Battalion (Winnipeg Grenadiers), CEF	22 December 1915	1 September 1917	The Winnipeg Grenadiers
101st Battalion (Winnipeg Light Infantry), CEF	22 December 1915	12 October 1917	The Royal Winnipeg Rifles
**102nd Battalion, CEF**	22 December 1915	30 August 1920	The British Columbia Regiment (Duke of Connaught's Own)
103rd Battalion, CEF	22 December 1915	1 September 1917	The Canadian Scottish Regiment (Princess Mary's)
104th Battalion, CEF	22 December 1915	27 July 1918	The Royal New Brunswick Regiment
105th Battalion (Prince Edward Island Highlanders), CEF	22 December 1915	12 October 1917	The Prince Edward Island Regiment (RCAC)
106th Battalion (Nova Scotia Rifles), CEF	22 December 1915	8 December 1917	The Nova Scotia Highlanders
107th Battalion (Winnipeg), CEF	22 December 1915	15 September 1920	Not perpetuated
108th Battalion (Selkirk), CEF	22 December 1915	4 August 1917	Not perpetuated
109th Battalion (Victoria & Haliburton), CEF	22 December 1915	21 May 1917	50th Field Artillery Regiment (The Prince of Wales' Rangers), RCA
110th Battalion (Perth), CEF	22 December 1915	17 July 1917	The Perth Regiment
111th Battalion (South Waterloo), CEF	22 December 1915	21 May 1917	The Royal Highland Fusiliers of Canada
112th Battalion (Nova Scotia), CEF	22 December 1915	15 August 1918	The West Nova Scotia Regiment
113th Battalion (Lethbridge Highlanders), CEF	22 December 1915	1 September 1917	The South Alberta Light Horse
114th Battalion (Haldimand), CEF	22 December 1915	21 May 1917	56th Field Artillery Regiment, RCA
115th Battalion (New Brunswick), CEF	22 December 1915	1 September 1917	The Royal New Brunswick Regiment
**116th Battalion (Ontario County), CEF**	22 December 1915	30 August 1920	The Ontario Regiment (RCAC)
117th (Eastern Townships) Battalion, CEF	22 December 1915	30 August 1920	The Sherbrooke Hussars
118th (North Waterloo) Battalion, CEF	22 December 1915	17 July 1917	The Royal Highland Fusiliers of Canada
119th (Algoma) Battalion, CEF	22 December 1915	29 November 1918	49th Field Artillery Regiment, RCA
120th (City of Hamilton) Battalion, CEF	22 December 1915	17 July 1917	The Royal Hamilton Light Infantry (Wentworth Regiment)
121st (Western Irish) Battalion, CEF	22 December 1915	17 July 1917	The British Columbia Regiment (Duke of Connaught's Own)
122nd (Muskoka) Battalion, CEF	22 December 1915	1 September 1917	The Algonquin Regiment (Northern Pioneers)
123rd Battalion (Royal Grenadiers), CEF	22 December 1915	15 September 1920	The Royal Regiment of Canada
124th Battalion (Governor General's Body Guard), CEF	22 December 1915	15 September 1920	The Royal Regiment of Canada
125th Battalion (1st Overseas Battalion of 38th Regiment Dufferin Rifles), CEF	22 December 1915	29 November 1918	56th Field Artillery Regiment, RCA
126th Battalion (Peel), CEF	22 December 1915	21 May 1917	The Lorne Scots (Peel, Dufferin and Halton Regiment)
127th Battalion (12th York Rangers), CEF	22 December 1915	23 October 1920	The Queen's York Rangers (1st American Regiment) (RCAC)
128th (Moose Jaw) Battalion, CEF	22 December 1915	30 August 1920	The Saskatchewan Dragoons
129th (Wentworth) Battalion, CEF	22 December 1915	21 May 1917	The Royal Hamilton Light Infantry (Wentworth Regiment)
130th Battalion (Lanark and Renfrew), CEF	22 December 1915	21 May 1917	42nd Field Artillery Regiment (Lanark and Renfrew Scottish), RCA
131st Battalion (Westminster), CEF	22 December 1915	17 July 1917	The Royal Westminster Regiment
132nd Battalion (North Shore), CEF	22 December 1915	21 May 1917	The North Shore (New Brunswick) Regiment
133rd (Norfolk's Own) Battalion, CEF	22 December 1915	17 July 1917	56th Field Artillery Regiment, RCA
134th (48th Highlanders) Battalion, CEF	22 December 1915	29 November 1918	48th Highlanders of Canada
135th (Middlesex) Battalion, CEF	22 December 1915	4 June 1917	The Middlesex and Huron Regiment
136th (Durham) Battalion, CEF	22 December 1915	22 May 1917	The Hastings and Prince Edward Regiment
137th (Calgary) Battalion, CEF	22 December 1915	17 July 1917	The King's Own Calgary Regiment (RCAC)
138th (Edmonton, Alberta) Battalion, CEF	22 December 1915	30 August 1920	The South Alberta Light Horse
139th (Northumberland) Battalion, CEF	22 December 1915	21 May 1917	The Hastings and Prince Edward Regiment
140th Battalion (St. John's Tigers), CEF	22 December 1915	27 July 1918	The Royal New Brunswick Regiment
141st (Rainy River District) Battalion (Border Bull Moose), CEF	22 December 1915	17 July 1917	The Lake Superior Scottish Regiment
142nd Battalion (London's Own), CEF	22 December 1915	27 July 1917	The Royal Canadian Regiment
143rd (British Columbia Bantams) Battalion, CEF	22 December 1915	4 April 1918	The Canadian Scottish Regiment (Princess Mary's)
144th (Winnipeg Rifles) Battalion, CEF	22 December 1915	17 July 1917	The Royal Winnipeg Rifles
145th Battalion (New Brunswick), CEF	22 December 1915	17 July 1917	The Royal New Brunswick Regiment
146th Battalion, CEF	22 December 1915	17 July 1917	33rd Medium Artillery Regiment, RCA
147th (Grey) Battalion, CEF	22 December 1915	1 September 1917	The Grey and Simcoe Foresters
148th Battalion, CEF	22 December 1915	4 August 1917	McGill University Contingent (148th Battalion, CEF) (COTC)
149th Battalion (Lambtons), CEF	22 December 1915	11 April 1918	26th Field Battery, RCA
150th (Carabiniers Mont-Royal) Battalion, CEF	22 December 1915	29 November 1918	Les Fusiliers Mont-Royal
151st (Central Alberta) Battalion, CEF	22 December 1915	15 September 1917	The North Alberta Regiment
152nd (Weyburn-Estevan) Battalion, CEF	22 December 1915	21 May 1917	The South Saskatchewan Regiment
153rd (Wellington) Battalion, CEF	22 December 1915	1 September 1917	26th Field Battery, RCA
154th (Stormont-Dundas-Glengarry) Battalion, CEF	22 December 1915	17 July 1917	Stormont, Dundas and Glengarry Highlanders
155th (Quinte) Battalion, CEF	22 December 1915	17 July 1917	The Hastings and Prince Edward Regiment
156th (Leeds and Grenville) Battalion, CEF	22 December 1915	29 November 1918	The Brockville Rifles
157th Battalion (Simcoe Foresters), CEF	22 December 1915	1 September 1917	The Grey and Simcoe Foresters
158th Battalion (The Duke of Connaught's Own), CEF	22 December 1915	27 July 1917	The British Columbia Regiment (Duke of Connaught's Own)
159th Battalion (1st Algonquins), CEF	22 December 1915	27 July 1917	The Algonquin Regiment (Northern Pioneers)
160th (Bruce) Battalion, CEF	22 December 1915	29 November 1918	97th Field Battery, RCA
161st (Huron) Battalion, CEF	22 December 1915	15 September 1920	The Middlesex and Huron Regiment
162nd (Parry Sound) Battalion, CEF	22 December 1915	30 August 1920	The Algonquin Regiment (Northern Pioneers)
163rd Battalion (French-Canadian), CEF	22 December 1915	15 September 1917	Les Fusiliers de Sherbrooke
164th Battalion (Halton and Dufferin), CEF	22 December 1915	29 November 1918	The Lorne Scots (Peel, Dufferin and Halton Regiment)
165th Battalion (Acadiens), CEF	22 December 1915	15 April 1918	The North Shore (New Brunswick) Regiment
166th Battalion (Queen's Own Rifles of Canada), CEF	22 December 1915	15 September 1917	The Queen's Own Rifles of Canada
167th (Canadien-Français) Battalion, CEF	22 December 1915	12 July 1918	Les Chasseurs Canadiens
168th Battalion (Oxfords), CEF	22 December 1915	4 April 1918	The Royal Canadian Regiment
169th Battalion (109th Regiment), CEF	15 July 1916	27 July 1917	Not perpetuated
170th Battalion (Mississauga Horse), CEF	15 July 1916	17 July 1917	The Royal Regiment of Canada
171st Battalion (Quebec Rifles), CEF	15 July 1916	27 July 1917	The Royal Rifles of Canada
172nd Battalion (Rocky Mountain Rangers), CEF	15 July 1916	17 July 1917	The Rocky Mountain Rangers
173rd Battalion (Canadian Highlanders), CEF	15 July 1916	1 September 1917	The Argyll and Sutherland Highlanders of Canada (Princess Louise's)
174th Battalion (Cameron Highlanders of Canada), CEF	15 July 1916	1 September 1917	The Queen's Own Cameron Highlanders of Canada
175th (Medicine Hat) Battalion, CEF	15 July 1916	17 July 1917	The South Alberta Light Horse
176th Battalion (Niagara Rangers), CEF	15 July 1916	30 August 1920	The Lincoln and Welland Regiment
177th Battalion (Simcoe Foresters), CEF	15 July 1916	15 April 1918	The Grey and Simcoe Foresters
178th Battalion (Canadien-Français), CEF	15 July 1916	21 May 1917	12^{e} Régiment blindé du Canada
179th Battalion (Cameron Highlanders of Canada), CEF	15 July 1916	17 July 1917	The Queen's Own Cameron Highlanders of Canada
180th Battalion (Sportsmen), CEF	15 July 1916	21 May 1917	The Irish Regiment of Canada
181st Battalion (Brandon), CEF	15 July 1916	17 July 1917	26th Field Artillery Regiment, RCA
182nd Battalion (Ontario County), CEF	15 July 1916	1 September 1917	The Ontario Regiment (RCAC)
183rd Battalion (Manitoba Beavers), CEF	15 July 1916	8 December 1917	Not perpetuated
184th Battalion, CEF	15 July 1916	1 September 1917	Not perpetuated
185th Canadian Infantry Battalion (Cape Breton Highlanders), CEF	15 July 1916	29 November 1918	The Cape Breton Highlanders
186th (Kent) Battalion, CEF	15 July 1916	15 September 1917	The Essex and Kent Scottish
187th (Central Alberta) Battalion, CEF	15 July 1916	11 April 1918	The South Alberta Light Horse
188th (Saskatchewan) Battalion, CEF	15 July 1916	27 July 1917	64th Field Battery, RCA, and 202nd Field Battery, RCA
189th (Canadien-Français) Battalion, CEF	15 July 1916	8 December 1917	Les Fusiliers du S^{t}-Laurent
190th Battalion (Winnipeg Rifles), CEF	15 July 1916	1 September 1917	The Royal Winnipeg Rifles
191st (Southern Alberta) Battalion, CEF	15 July 1916	4 August 1917	The North Alberta Regiment
192nd (Crow's Nest Pass) Battalion, CEF	15 July 1916	12 October 1917 (Note: Absorbed by 9th Canadian Reserve Battalion on 12 November 1916)	The North Alberta Regiment
193rd Battalion (Nova Scotia Highlanders), CEF	15 July 1916	18 February 1918	The Nova Scotia Highlanders
194th Battalion (Edmonton Highlanders), CEF	15 July 1916	12 October 1917	Not perpetuated
195th (City of Regina) Battalion, CEF	15 July 1916	27 July 1918	The Royal Regina Rifles
196th Battalion (Western Universities), CEF	15 July 1916	1 September 1917	Not perpetuated
197th Battalion (Vikings of Canada), CEF	15 July 1916	1 September 1917	Not perpetuated
198th Battalion (Canadian Buffs), CEF	15 July 1916	29 November 1918	The Queen's Own Rifles of Canada
199th Battalion Duchess of Connaught's Own Irish Rangers, CEF	15 July 1916	15 September 1917	The Irish Canadian Rangers
200th (Winnipeg) Battalion, CEF	15 July 1916	27 July 1917	Not perpetuated
201st Battalion (Toronto Light Infantry), CEF	15 July 1916	12 July 1918	Not perpetuated
202nd (Sportsman's) Battalion, CEF	15 July 1916	18 February 1918	The South Alberta Light Horse
203rd Battalion (Winnipeg Rifles), CEF	15 July 1916	15 September 1917	The Royal Winnipeg Rifles
204th Battalion (Beavers), CEF	15 July 1916	17 July 1917	The Royal Regiment of Canada
205th (Hamilton) Battalion, CEF	15 July 1916	12 July 1918	The Royal Hamilton Light Infantry (Wentworth Regiment)
206th (Canadien-Français) Battalion, CEF	15 July 1916	1 August 1918	Le Régiment de Maisonneuve
207th (Ottawa-Carleton) Battalion, CEF	15 July 1916	11 April 1918	The Cameron Highlanders of Ottawa (Duke of Edinburgh's Own)
208th Battalion (Canadian Irish), CEF	15 July 1916	30 August 1920	The Irish Regiment of Canada
209th (Swift Current) Battalion, CEF	15 July 1916	21 May 1917	14th Canadian Hussars
210th Battalion (Frontiersmen), CEF	15 July 1916	1 September 1917	Not perpetuated
211th Battalion (American Legion), CEF	15 July 1916	21 March 1917	Not perpetuated
212th Battalion (American Legion), CEF	15 July 1916	8 October 1916	Not perpetuated
213th Battalion (American Legion), CEF	15 July 1916	15 September 1920	Not perpetuated
214th (Saskatchewan) Battalion, CEF	15 July 1916	27 July 1917	Not perpetuated
215th Battalion (2nd Overseas Battalion of 38th Regiment Dufferin Rifles), CEF	15 July 1916	1 September 1917	56th Field Artillery Regiment, RCA
216th Battalion (Bantams), CEF	15 July 1916	1 September 1917	The Governor General's Horse Guards
217th (Qu'Appelle) Battalion, CEF	15 July 1916	1 September 1917	10th Field Artillery Regiment, RCA
218th (Edmonton) Battalion, CEF	15 July 1916	5 April 1918	Not perpetuated
219th Highland Battalion (Nova Scotia), CEF	15 July 1916	15 September 1917	The West Nova Scotia Regiment
220th Battalion (12th Regiment York Rangers), CEF	15 July 1916	1 September 1917	The Queen's York Rangers (1st American Regiment) (RCAC)
221st Battalion, CEF	15 July 1916	4 August 1917	Not perpetuated
222nd Battalion, CEF	15 July 1916	1 September 1917	The Royal Winnipeg Rifles
223rd Battalion (Canadian Scandinavians), CEF	15 July 1916	1 September 1917	Not perpetuated
224th Battalion, CEF	15 July 1916	18 February 1918	Not perpetuated
225th (Kootenay) Battalion, CEF	15 July 1916	1 September 1917	24th Field Artillery Regiment, RCA
226th Battalion (Men of the North), CEF	15 July 1916	27 July 1917	The Royal Winnipeg Rifles, 49th Field Artillery Regiment, RCA, and The Fort Garry Horse
227th (Sudbury-Manitoulin-Algoma) Battalion (Men o' the North), CEF	15 July 1916	11 April 1918	49th Field Artillery Regiment, RCA
228th Battalion (Northern Fusiliers), CEF	15 July 1916	23 October 1920	The Algonquin Regiment (Northern Pioneers)
229th (South Saskatchewan) Battalion, CEF	15 July 1916	15 September 1917	Not perpetuated
230th Battalion (Voltigeurs Canadiens-Français), CEF	15 July 1916	27 July 1918	Le Régiment de Hull (RCAC)
231st Battalion (Seaforth Highlanders of Canada), CEF	15 July 1916	11 April 1918	The Seaforth Highlanders of Canada
232nd (Saskatchewan) Battalion, CEF	15 July 1916	12 October 1917	The North Saskatchewan Regiment
233rd Battalion (Canadiens-Français du Nord-Ouest), CEF	15 July 1916	15 September 1920	Not perpetuated
234th Battalion (Peel), CEF	15 July 1916	1 September 1917	The Lorne Scots (Peel, Dufferin and Halton Regiment)
235th Battalion, CEF	15 July 1916	1 September 1917	Not perpetuated
236th Battalion (New Brunswick Kilties), CEF	15 July 1916	30 August 1920	The Royal New Brunswick Regiment
237th Battalion (American Legion), CEF	15 July 1916	8 October 1916	Not perpetuated
238th Battalion, CEF	15 July 1916	15 September 1920	Became 14th Company, Canadian Forestry Corps in 1916
239th Battalion, CEF	15 July 1916	15 September 1920	Not perpetuated
240th Battalion, CEF	15 July 1916	1 September 1917	42nd Field Artillery Regiment (Lanark and Renfrew Scottish), RCA
241st Battalion (Canadian Scottish Borderers), CEF	15 July 1916	1 September 1917	The Essex and Kent Scottish
242nd Battalion, CEF	15 July 1916	29 November 1918	Absorbed into Canadian Forestry Corps while in Canada
243rd Battalion, CEF	15 July 1916	11 April 1918	Absorbed into 15th Reserve Battalion, CEF on arrival in France
244th Battalion (Kitchener's Own), CEF	17 July 1917	17 July 1917	Victoria Rifles of Canada
245th Battalion (Canadian Grenadier Guards), CEF	15 July 1916	17 July 1917	The Canadian Grenadier Guards
246th (Nova Scotia Highlanders) Battalion, CEF	1 May 1917	11 April 1918	The Nova Scotia Highlanders
247th Battalion (Victoria & Haliburton), CEF	1 May 1917	11 April 1918	50th Field Artillery Regiment (The Prince of Wales Rangers), RCA
248th Battalion, CEF	1 May 1917	15 September 1917	The Grey and Simcoe Foresters
249th (Saskatchewan) Battalion, CEF	1 February 1917	27 July 1918	Absorbed into 15th Reserve Battalion, CEF on arrival in France
250th (Winnipeg) Battalion, CEF	1 February 1917	12 July 1918	Absorbed into 249th (Saskatchewan) Battalion on arrival in France
251st Battalion (Good Fellows), CEF	1 February 1917	12 July 1918	Absorbed into other units during war
252nd Battalion (Lindsay), CEF	1 May 1917	1 September 1917	50th Field Artillery Regiment (The Prince of Wales Rangers), RCA
253rd (Queen's University) Highland Battalion, CEF	1 May 1917	8 December 1917	The Princess of Wales' Own Regiment
254th Battalion (Quinte's Own), CEF	1 May 1917	15 September 1917	The Hastings and Prince Edward Regiment
255th Battalion (Queen's Own Rifles of Canada), CEF	1 May 1917	1 September 1917	The Queen's Own Rifles of Canada
256th Battalion, CEF	1 May 1917	23 October 1920	The Algonquin Regiment (Northern Pioneers)
257th Battalion, CEF	1 February 1917	1 November 1920	Not perpetuated
258th (Canadien-Français) Battalion, CEF	15 June 1917	17 October 1917	Not perpetuated
**259th Battalion, Canadian Rifles, CEF (Siberia)**	1 November 1918	6 November 1920	12^{e} Régiment blindé du Canada
**260th Battalion, Canadian Rifles, CEF (Siberia)**	1 November 1918	15 November 1920	Princess Patricia's Canadian Light Infantry

== Sources ==
- Chartrand, René (2007). The Canadian Corps in World War I. Men-at-Arms No. 439. Oxford: Osprey Publishing. ISBN 9781846031861.
- Canadian Expeditionary Force, 1914–1919 by G. W. L. Nicholson. Ottawa, Dept. of National Defence, 1962.
- "Infantry" (PDF). Library and Archives Canada. Guide to Sources Relating to Units of the Canadian Expeditionary Force. 22 September 2020.
- Meek, John F. Over the Top! The Canadian Infantry in the First World War. Orangeville, Ont: The Author, 1971.
