= 225th Regiment =

225th Regiment may refer to:

- 225th Infantry Regiment (United States)
- 225th Infantry Regiment "Arezzo", Italy
- 225th Medical Regiment, Britain
- 225th Anti-aircraft Missile Regiment, Ukraine
- 225th Separate Assault Regiment, Ukraine

== See also ==
- 225th Brigade (disambiguation)
- 225th Division (disambiguation)
- 225th (disambiguation)
