= 225 (disambiguation) =

225 may refer to:

- 225 (year)
- 225 (number)
- 225 BC
- NGC 225
- UFC 225
- Nikkei 225
- 225 series
- Kroger 225
- 225 Henrietta
- Area code 225

== See also ==
- 225th (disambiguation)
