= Kootenay Regiment =

The Kootenay Regiment
- Active: 1914-1936
- Country: Canada
- Branch: Canadian Militia
- Type: Line Infantry
- Role: Infantry
- Part of: Non-Permanent Active Militia
- Garrison/HQ: Fernie, British Columbia
- Engagements: First World War
- Battle honours: See #Battle Honours

The Kootenay Regiment was an infantry regiment of the Non-Permanent Active Militia of the Canadian Militia (now the Canadian Army). In 1936, the regiment was converted to artillery to form the 24th Field Artillery Regiment, RCA which is today currently on the Supplementary Order of Battle.

The regiment perpetuated the 54th Battalion (Kootenay), CEF, and the 225th (Kootenay) Battalion, CEF.

== Lineage ==
- Originated on 1 May 1914, in Fernie, British Columbia as an eight company regiment of infantry.
- Redesignated on 2 November 1914, as the 107th (East Kootenay) Regiment.
- Redesignated on 12 March 1920, as The Kootenay Regiment.
- Converted on 15 December 1936, from infantry to artillery and Redesignated as the 24th (Kootenay) Field Brigade, RCA (now the 24th Field Artillery Regiment, RCA - currently on the Supplementary Order of Battle).

== Organization ==
=== 107th (East Kootenay) Regiment (01 January, 1915) ===
- A Company (Fernie, British Columbia)
- B Company (Fernie, British Columbia)
- C Company (Cranbrook, British Columbia)
- D Company (Cranbrook, British Columbia)
- E Company (Elko, British Columbia)
- F Company (Creston, British Columbia)
- G Company (Athalmer, British Columbia)
- H Company (Golden, British Columbia)

=== 107th East Kootenay Regiment (01 April, 1916) ===
- A Company (Fernie, British Columbia)
- B Company (Fernie, British Columbia)
- C Company (Michel, British Columbia)
- D Company (Cranbrook, British Columbia)
- E Company (Fernie, British Columbia)
- F Company (Creston, British Columbia)
- G Company (Nelson, British Columbia)
- H Company (Nelson, British Columbia)

=== The Kootenay Regiment (01 March, 1921) ===
- 1st Battalion (perpetuating the 54th Battalion, CEF)
  - A Company (Nelson, BC; later moved to Kimberley, British Columbia)
  - B Company (Fernie, BC; later moved to Cranbrook, British Columbia)
  - C Company (Cranbrook, British Columbia)
  - D Company (Creston, British Columbia)
- 2nd (Reserve) Battalion (perpetuating 225th Battalion, CEF)

== Battle Honours ==
- Mount Sorrel
- Somme, 1916
- Ancre Heights
- Ancre, 1916
- Arras, 1917, '18
- Vimy, 1917
- Hill 70
- Ypres, 1917
- Passchendaele
- Amiens
- Scarpe, 1918
- Drocourt–Quéant
- Hindenburg Line
- Canal du Nord
- Valenciennes
- Sambre
- France and Flanders, 1916–18
