= 243 (disambiguation) =

243 or variant, may refer to:

- 243 (number)

== Date and time ==
- AD 243 CE, a year
- 243 BC/BCE, a year
- March 24 (24/3)

== Places ==
- 243 Ida, a main-belt asteroid, the 243rd asteroid registered
- 243P/NEAT (Comet NEAT 243), a periodic comet, the 243rd periodical registered
- Lebo–Waverly USD 243, Kansas, USA; a unified school district, #243
- NA-243 (Karachi East-II), Pakistan; a national assembly constituency
- Collholme No. 243, Alberta, Canada; a municipal district

== Transportation ==
- ARO-243, a 4x4 offroad vehicle from ARO (Auto Romania)
- DR Class 243, German electric locomotive class
- Tupolev Tu-243, Soviet unmanned reconnaissance aircraft
- Highway 243, several highways
- Flight 243 (disambiguation), several airline flights

== Ships with pennant 243 ==
- HMS Trent (K243), a British Royal Navy River-class frigate
- HMS Scotsman (P243), a British WWII Royal Navy S-class submarine
- HMIS Bengal (J243), a WWII Indian Navy Bathurst-class corvette
- USS Sands (DD-243), a WWII U.S. Navy Clemson-class destroyer
- USS J. Richard Ward (DE-243), a WWII U.S. Navy Edsall-class destroyer escort
- USS Illusive (AM-243), a WWII U.S. Navy minesweeper
- USS Bream (SSK-243), a WWII U.S. Navy Gato-class submarine
- USNS Sgt. Archer T. Gammon (T-AK-243), a WWII U.S. Navy auxiliary Boulder Victory-class cargo ship

== Military units 243 ==
- No. 243 Squadron RAF (UK)
- 243rd Aviation Company, U.S. Army (USA)
- VMSB-243, Marine Scout Bombing Squadron (USA)
- 243rd Air Traffic Control Squadron USAF (USA)
- 243 Provost Company, Royal Military Police (UK)
- 243 (The Wessex) Field Hospital, Royal Army Medical Corps (UK)
- 243 Construction Squadron, Royal Engineers (UK)
- 243rd Guards Motor Rifle Regiment, Red Army; a Soviet Cold War unit
- 243rd Rifle Division, NKVD, Red Army; a Soviet unit in WWII
- 243rd Static Infantry Division (Wehrmacht), WWII Germany
- 243rd Coast Artillery (United States), Rhode Island National Guard interwar unit
- 243d Aero Squadron, U.S. Army Air Corps, an interwar unit
- 243rd Battalion, CEF, WWI Canadian Army unit
- 243rd Infantry Division (German Empire), WWI

== Weaponry ==
- M243 smoke grenade launcher (model 243)
- .243 calibre for firearms
  - .243 Winchester rifle round
  - .243 Winchester Super Short Magnum (.243 WSSM), rifle rounds

== Communications ==
- +243; the calling code for the Democratic Republic of the Congo, the country once known as Zaire.
- 243 AM, 243 kHz in AM radio
- 243 MHz (UHF Guard frequency), an aircraft emergency frequency for military aircraft.

== Isotope 243 ==
- Americium-243
- Berkelium-243
- Californium-243
- Curium-243
- Einsteinium-243
- Neptunium-243

== Other uses ==
- United Nations Security Council Resolution 243
