= Harry Miner =

Canadian soldier, posthumous Victoria Cross (1891–1918)

Harry Garnet Bedford Miner VC
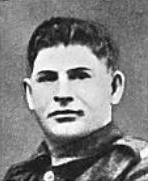
- Born: 24 June 1891; Cedar Springs, Ontario
- Died: 8 August 1918 (aged 27) †; Demuin, France
- Burial place: Crouy Military Cemetery, Crouy-Saint-Pierre
- Military career
- Allegiance: Canada
- Service years: 1915–1918
- Rank: Corporal
- Units: 58th Battalion, CEF
- Conflicts: First World War: Hundred Days Offensive; Battle of Amiens †
- Awards: Victoria Cross; Croix de Guerre (France)

Harry Garnet Bedford Miner VC (24 June 1891 – 8 August 1918) was a soldier in the Canadian Expeditionary Force during the First World War and posthumous recipient of the Victoria Cross, the highest and most prestigious award for gallantry "in the face of the enemy" that can be awarded to British and Commonwealth forces. He earned the award for events that occurred during the Battle of Amiens in August 1918. There are two plaques in his memory in his hometown, Cedar Springs, Ontario and his medals are displayed in a local museum.

== Early life ==
Harry Garnet Bedford Miner was born at Cedar Springs in Ontario, on 24 June 1891, the son of John and Orphra Miner. He was educated in Selton and at Highgate School in Oxford Township. After finishing his education, he took up farming. He lived for a time in the United States, first in Ohio and then Detroit.

== First World War ==
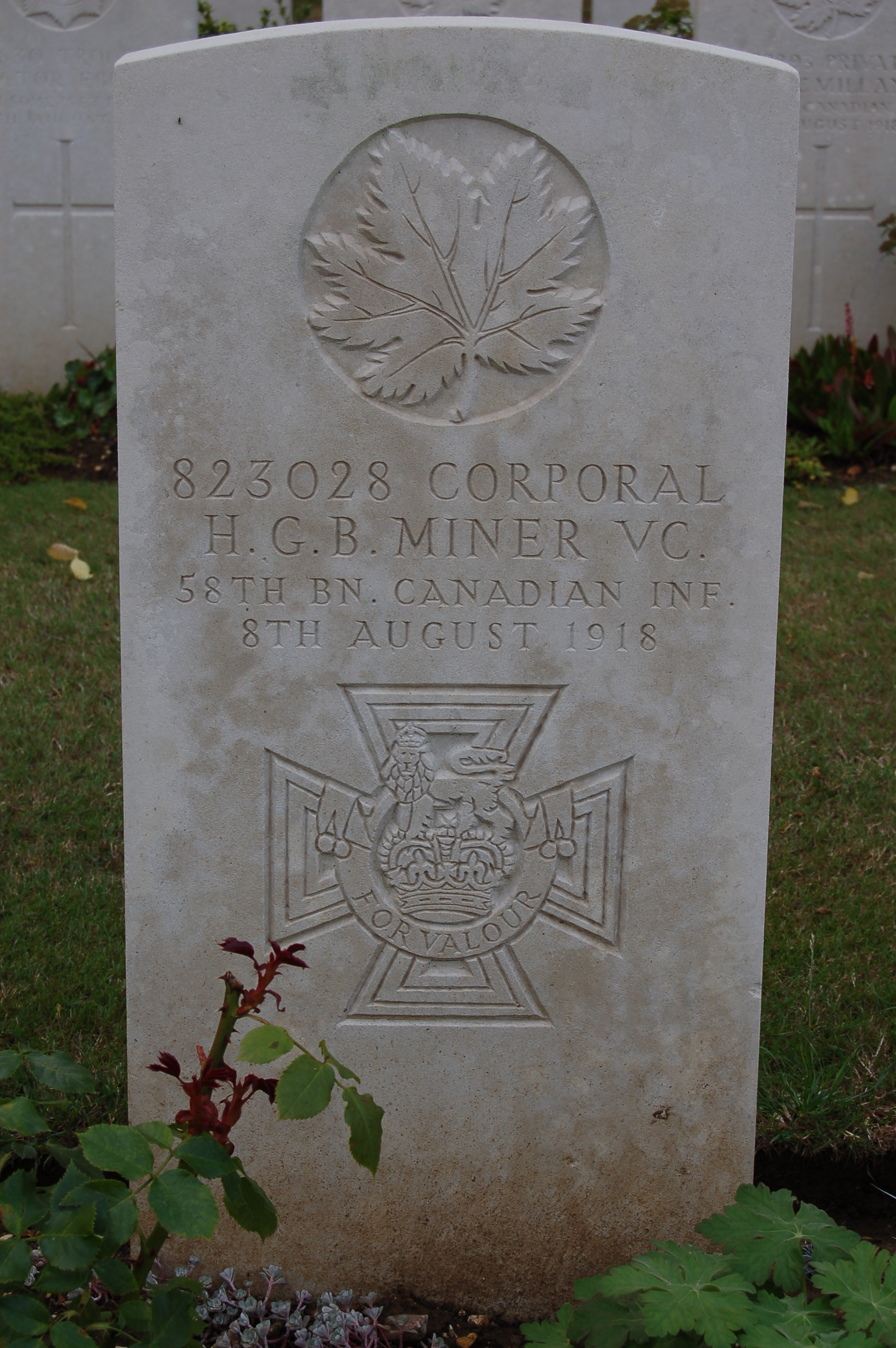
Miner's grave at Crouy Military Cemetery

In November 1915, after the outbreak of the First World War, he enlisted in the Canadian Army. He volunteered for the Canadian Expeditionary Force and was posted to the 142nd Battalion. Arriving in England at the end of October 1916 as a lance corporal, he was transferred to the 161st Battalion. Then, after a period of training, he was sent to the Western Front and taken onto the strength of the 58th Battalion, part of 9th Brigade, 3rd Canadian Division. In early 1918, he was awarded the Croix de Guerre for his actions as a leader of a wiring party late the previous year. He was also promoted to corporal.

On 8 August 1918, the opening day of the Battle of Amiens, and the beginning of the Hundred Days Offensive, the 9th Brigade was engaged in fighting at Rifle Wood and then near Demuin. It was at the latter location that he performed the actions that led to his recommendation for the Victoria Cross (VC). He was involved in attacks on two machinegun positions and then a bombing post, and was severely wounded in the process. He died later that day of his injuries. The citation for his VC read:

For most conspicuous bravery and devotion to duty in attack, when despite severe wounds he refused to withdraw. He rushed an enemy machine-gun post single-handed, killed the entire crew and turned the gun on the enemy. Later, with two others, he attacked another enemy machine-gun post, and succeeded in putting the gun out of action. Cpl. Miner then rushed single-handed an enemy bombing post, bayoneting two of the garrison and putting the remainder to flight. He was mortally wounded in the performance of this gallant deed.

— The London Gazette, 26 October 1918

Miner was buried in the Crouy Military Cemetery just outside the village of Crouy-Saint-Pierre, about 15 kilometers northwest of Amiens and about 25 km northwest of the battlefield on which he fell.

== The medal ==
Miner's medals, including the VC and the Croix de Guerre, are on display at Huron County Museum in Goderich, Ontario. There is a plaque to his memory in his hometown of Cedar Springs; it was unveiled on 22 September 1963 by his brother Ross Miner. There is another plaque to him in the United Church at Cedar Springs. Branch 185 of the Royal Canadian Legion in Blenheim, Ontario, is named the Harry Miner Branch. Branch 140 of the Royal Canadian Legion in Clinton, Ontario is also named after him.
