= 183rd Battalion (Manitoba Beavers), CEF =

The 183rd (Manitoba Beavers) Battalion, CEF was a unit in the Canadian Expeditionary Force during the First World War. Based in Winnipeg, Manitoba, the unit began recruiting during the winter of 1915/16 throughout the Province of Manitoba. After sailing to England in October 1916, the battalion was broken up in November 1916 and its men transferred to the following units: 100th Battalion, CEF, 107th Battalion, CEF, 108th Battalion, CEF, and the 144th Battalion, CEF. The 183rd (Manitoba Beavers) Battalion, CEF had one Officer Commanding: Lieut-Col. W. T. Edgecombe.
