= 26th Field Artillery Regiment, RCA =

- 26^{e} Régiment d'artillerie de campagne, ARC
- Active: 1 April 1908–present
- Country: Canada
- Branch: Canadian Army
- Type: Field artillery
- Size: 3 batteries
- Part of: 38 Canadian Brigade Group
- Garrison/HQ: Brandon and Portage la Prairie, Manitoba
- Mottos: Ubique (Latin for 'everywhere'), Quo fas et gloria ducunt (Latin for 'whither right and glory lead')
- March: Quick: "British Grenadiers"

The 26th Field Artillery Regiment, Royal Canadian Artillery, is a Canadian Army Primary Reserve artillery regiment based in Brandon and Portage la Prairie, Manitoba. 71 Field Battery, Headquarters and Service Battery, and Regimental Headquarters are in Brandon (49.8418°N 99.9532°W), and 13 Field Battery is in Portage la Prairie (49.9765°N 98.2875°W). Together with 10th Field Artillery Regiment, RCA and 116th Independent Field Battery, RCA, it forms the 38 Artillery Tactical Group within the 38 Canadian Brigade Group of 3rd Canadian Division.

== History ==
=== Early history ===
On 1 April 1908, the 99th Regiment Manitoba Rangers was first authorized for service. The Regiment's Headquarters was in Brandon and had companies in at Brandon, Portage la Prairie and Carberry, Manitoba.

=== Great War ===
On 6 August 1914, Details from the 99th Manitoba Rangers were placed on active service for local protection duties.

On 7 November 1914, the 45th Battalion (Manitoba), CEF was authorized for service and on 1 April 1916, the battalion embarked for Great Britain. After its arrival in the UK, the battalion provided reinforcements to the Canadian Corps in the field. On 7 July 1916, the battalion was absorbed by the 11th Reserve Battalion, CEF. On 17 July 1917, the 45th Battalion, CEF was disbanded.

On 10 July 1915, the 79th Battalion (Manitoba), CEF was authorized for service and on 24 April 1916, the battalion embarked for Great Britain. After its arrival in the UK, the battalion provided reinforcements to the Canadian Corps in the field. On 12 July 1916, the battalion was absorbed by the 17th Reserve Battalion, CEF. On 12 October 1917, the 79th Battalion, CEF was disbanded.

On 15 July 1916, the 181st Battalion (Brandon), CEF was authorized for service and on 18 April 1917, the battalion embarked for Great Britain. After its arrival in the UK, on 30 April 1917, the battalion's personnel were absorbed by the 18th Reserve Battalion, CEF to provide reinforcements for the Canadian Corps in the field. On 17 July 1917, the 181st Battalion, CEF was disbanded.

=== 1920s–1930s ===
On 15 March 1920, as a result of the Otter Commission and the subsequent reorganization of the Canadian Militia, the 99th Manitoba Rangers was redesignated as The Manitoba Rangers and was reorganized with three battalions (two of them paper-only reserve battalions) to perpetuate the assigned war-raised battalions of the Canadian Expeditionary Force.

In 1930 the regiment was awarded these battle honours for the Great War:

- Mount Sorrel
- Somme, 1916
- Arras, 1917, '18
- Hill 70
- Ypres, 1917
- Amiens
- Hindenburg Line
- Pursuit to Mons

The regiment was converted to artillery in 1936 when it was merged with the 59th Field Battery.

== Organization ==
=== 98th Regiment (1 April 1908) ===
- Regimental Headquarters (Brandon, Manitoba)
- A Company (Brandon, Manitoba)
- B Company (Brandon, Manitoba)
- C Company (Portage la Prairie, Manitoba; redesignated on 1 April 1910 as D Company)
- D Company (Portage La Prairie, Manitoba; redesignated on 1 April 1910 as E Company)
- E Company (Carberry, Manitoba; moved on 1 April 1910 to Brandon and redesignated as C Company)
- F Company (Souris, Manitoba; moved on 16 June 1913 to Brandon)

=== The Manitoba Rangers (15 March 1920) ===
- 1st Battalion (perpetuating the 45th Battalion, CEF)
- 2nd (Reserve) Battalion (perpetuating the 79th Battalion, CEF)
- 3rd (Reserve) Battalion (perpetuating the 181st Battalion, CEF)

== Alliances ==
- United Kingdom - The Sherwood Foresters (Nottinghamshire and Derbyshire Regiment) (Until 1936)

== Allocated batteries ==
- 13th Field Battery, RCA
- 71st Field Battery, RCA

== Lineage ==
- Originated on 1 April 1908, in Brandon, Manitoba, as the 99th Regiment.
- Redesignated on 1 May 1911, as the 99th Manitoba Rangers.
- Redesignated on 12 March 1920, as The Manitoba Rangers.
- Amalgamated on 15 December 1936, with the 59th Field Battery, RCA, and redesignated as the 26th Field Brigade, RCA.
- Redesignated on 7 November 1940, as the 26th (Reserve) Field Brigade.
- Redesignated on 1 April 1943, as the 26th (Reserve) Field Regiment.
- Redesignated on 1 April 1946, as the 26th Field Regiment (Self-Propelled), RCA.
- Redesignated on 12 April 1960, as the 26th Field Artillery Regiment (Self-Propelled), RCA.
- Redesignated on 1 November 1964, as the 26th Field Artillery Regiment, RCA.

=== 59th Field Battery, RCA ===
- Originated on 2 February 1920, in Portage la Prairie, Manitoba, as the 59th Battery, Canadian Field Artillery.
- Redesignated on 1 July 1925, as the 59th Field Battery, CA.
- Redesignated on 3 June 1935, as the 59th Field Battery, RCA.
- Amalgamated on 15 December 1936, with The Manitoba Rangers.

=== Chart ===
Lineage chart

1908	99th Regt
1911	99th Manitoba Rangers
1914	45th Bn, CEF
1915	79th "Overseas" Bn, CEF
1916	Absorbed by 11th Reserve Bn	Absorbed by 17th Reserve Bn	181st "Overseas" Bn, CEF
1917	Absorbed by 18th Reserve Bn
1920	1st Bn (45th Bn, CEF), The Manitoba Rangers	2nd Bn (79th Bn, CEF), (Note: Reserve) The Manitoba Rangers	3rd Bn (181st Bn, CEF), The Manitoba Rangers
1936	26th Fd Bde, RCA	Disbanded	Disbanded
1940	26th (Reserve) Fd Bde, RCA
1943	26th (Reserve) Fd Regt, RCA
1946	26th Fd Regt (Self-Propelled), RCA
1960	26th Fd Arty Regt (Self-Propelled), RCA
1964	26th Fd Arty Regt, RCA

== Perpetuations ==
=== The Great War ===
- 45th Battalion (Manitoba), CEF
- 79th Battalion (Manitoba), CEF
- 181st Battalion (Brandon), CEF

== 26th Field Artillery Regiment, Royal Canadian Artillery, Museum ==
26th Field Artillery Regiment, Royal Canadian Artillery, Museum
- Location: 1116 Victoria Avenue, Brandon, Manitoba, Canada
- Type: Regimental Museum

The museum collects, preserves, researches and exhibits articles of military interest, primarily from the Western Manitoba area. The museum is affiliated with: CMA, CHIN, OMMC and Virtual Museum of Canada.

== See also ==
- Organization of Military Museums of Canada
- Military history of Canada
- History of the Canadian Army
- Canadian Forces
- List of armouries in Canada

Preceded by 20th Field Artillery Regiment, RCA	26th Field Artillery Regiment (Canada)	Succeeded by 30th Field Artillery Regiment, RCA of Royal Canadian Artillery
