= 229th Regiment =

229th Regiment may refer to:

- 229th Aviation Regiment, United States
- 229th Infantry Regiment, Imperial Japanese Army

== See also ==
- 229th (disambiguation)
