= 225th Brigade =

225th Brigade may refer to:

- 225th Mixed Brigade (Spain)
- 225th Brigade (United Kingdom)
- 225th Engineer Brigade, United States

== See also ==
- 225th Brigade Support Battalion, United States
- 225th Division (disambiguation)
- 225th Regiment (disambiguation)
- 225th (disambiguation)
