= 229th Division =

229th Division may refer to:

- 229th Division (Imperial Japanese Army)
- 229th Rifle Division, Soviet Union

== See also ==
- List of military divisions by number
- 229th Regiment (disambiguation)
- 229th (disambiguation)
