= Middlesex and Huron Regiment =

The Middlesex and Huron Regiment
- Active: 1866 - 1946
- Country: Canada
- Branch: Canadian Militia (1866-1940); Canadian Army (1940-1946)
- Type: Line Infantry
- Role: Infantry
- Size: One Regiment
- Part of: Non-Permanent Active Militia (1871-1940); Royal Canadian Infantry Corps (1942-1946)
- Garrison/HQ: Strathroy, Ontario
- Motto: Defence not defiance
- Engagements: Second Boer War; First World War
- Battle honours: South Africa, 1899-1900; Ypres, 1917; Arras, 1917, ’18; Hill 70; Amiens; Hindenburg Line; Pursuit to Mons; The Great War, 1916-1918

The Middlesex and Huron Regiment was an infantry regiment of the Non-Permanent Active Militia of the Canadian Militia (now the Canadian Army). It was formed in 1936, as a result of the Amalgamation of The Middlesex Light Infantry and The Huron Regiment. In 1946, the regiment was disbanded.

== Lineage ==
=== The Middlesex Light Infantry ===
- Originated on 14 September 1866, in London, Ontario, as the 26th Middlesex Battalion of Infantry by the regimentation of several independent companies.
- Redesignated on 24 March 1880, as the 26th Middlesex Battalion of Light Infantry. Regimental HQ was later relocated to Strathroy, Ontario.
- Redesignated on 8 May 1900, as the 26th Regiment (Middlesex Light Infantry).
- Redesignated on 1 April 1920, as The Middlesex Light Infantry.
- Amalgamated on 1 September 1936, with The Huron Regiment to form The Middlesex and Huron Regiment.

=== The Huron Regiment ===
- Originated on September 14, 1866, in Goderich, Ontario, as the 33rd Huron Battalion of Infantry by the regimentation of several previously authorized independent artillery, rifle and infantry companies.
- Redesignated on May 8, 1900, as the 33rd Huron Regiment.
- Redesignated on April 1, 1920, as The Huron Regiment.
- Amalgamated on 1 September 1936, with The Middlesex Light Infantry to form The Middlesex and Huron Regiment.

=== The Middlesex and Huron Regiment ===
- Originated on September 1, 1936, by the Amalgamation of The Middlesex Light Infantry and The Huron Regiment.
- Disbanded on March 31, 1946.

== Perpetuations ==
- 135th (Middlesex) Battalion, CEF
- 161st (Huron) Battalion, CEF

== History ==
=== South African War ===
During the South African War, the 26th Regiment Middlesex Light Infantry contributed volunteers for the Canadian Contingents, most notably for the 2nd (Special Service) Battalion, Royal Canadian Regiment.

=== First World War ===
On 22 December 1915, the 135th Battalion, CEF was authorized and embarked for Great Britain on 24 August 1916. Upon arrival in the UK on 29 August 1916, it provided drafts to other CEF Battalions and was absorbed by the 125th Battalion, CEF. On 4 June 1917, the 135th Battalion, CEF was disbanded.

On 22 December 1915, the 161st Battalion, CEF was authorized and embarked for Great Britain on 1 November 1916. Upon arrival in the UK on 11 November 1916, it provided drafts to the 18th and 58th Battalion(s), CEF as well as to the 14th Canadian Brigade of the 5th Canadian Division until 15 February 1918, when the battalion was absorbed by the 4th Canadian Reserve Battalion. On 15 September 1920, the 161st Battalion, CEF was disbanded.

=== Amalgamation ===
On 1 April 1920, as a result of the following Militia Reorganizations following the Otter Commission, the 26th Regiment (Middlesex Light Infantry) and the 33rd Huron Regiment were respectively Redesignated as The Middlesex Light Infantry and The Huron Regiment.

On 1 September 1936, as a result of the 1936 Canadian Militia Reorganization, The Middlesex Light Infantry was Amalgamated with The Huron Regiment to form The Middlesex and Huron Regiment.

=== Disbandment ===
On 31 March 1946, The Middlesex and Huron Regiment was Disbanded.

== Organization ==
=== The Middlesex Light Infantry ===
==== 26th Middlesex Battalion of Infantry (14 September, 1866) ====
Formed by the regimentation of the listed independent companies:

- No. 1 Company (Delaware, Ontario) (first raised 30 Jan. 1863).
- No. 2 Company (Komoka (Lobo), Ontario) (first raised 17 July, 1861).
- No. 3 Company (Harriettsville, Ontario) (first raised 6 February, 1863).
- No. 4 Company (Thamesford, Ontario) (first raised 11 September, 1862).
- No. 5 Company (Lucan, Ontario) (first raised 19 December, 1862).
- No. 6 Company (Wardsville, Ontario) (first raised 2 January, 1863).
- No. 7 Company (Strathroy, Ontario) (first raised 8 June, 1866).

==== 26th Middlesex Battalion of Light Infantry (24 March, 1880) ====
Regimental HQ was relocated to Strathroy, Ontario.

- No. 1 Company (Delaware, Ontario).
- No. 2 Company (Komoka (Lobo), Ontario).
- No. 3 Company (Harriettsville, Ontario).
- No. 4 Company (Thamesford, Ontario).
- No. 5 Company (Lucan, Ontario).
- No. 6 Company (Wardsville, Ontario).
- No. 7 Company (Strathroy, Ontario).

=== The Huron Regiment ===
==== 33rd Huron Battalion of Infantry (September 14, 1866) ====
Formed by the regimentation of the listed independent companies:

- No. 1 Company "Garrison Battery" (Goderich, Ontario) (first raised on 21 November, 1862, as Goderich Company of Foot Artillery).
- No. 2 Company (Goderich, Ontario) (first raised on 22 January, 1862, as the Goderich Rifle Company).
- No. 3 Company (Seaforth, Ontario) (first raised on 21 November, 1862, as the Seaforth Infantry Company).
- No. 4 Company (Clinton, Ontario) (first raised on 8 June, 1866).
- No. 5 Company (Bayfield, Ontario) (first raised on 8 June, 1866).
- No. 6 Company (Exeter, Ontario) (first raised 31 August, 1866).
- No. 7 Company (Goderich Township, Ontario) (first raised on 17 August, 1866).

=== The Middlesex and Huron Regiment (September 1st, 1936) ===
- Regimental Headquarters (Strathroy, Ontario)
- A Company (Strathroy, Ontario).
- B Company (London, Ontario).
- C Company (Goderich, Ontario).
- D Company (Seaforth, Ontario).

== Alliances ==
Until disbanding in 1946, The Middlesex and Huron Regiment were Allied to The Middlesex Regiment (Duke of Cambridge's Own).

== Battle honours ==
=== South African War ===
- South Africa, 1899-1900

=== Great War ===
- Arras, 1917, ’18
- Hill 70
- Ypres, 1917
- Amiens
- Hindenburg Line
- Pursuit to Mons
