= 250th (Winnipeg) Battalion, CEF =

Canadian military unit during World War I

The 250th Battalion, CEF was a unit in the Canadian Expeditionary Force during the First World War. Based in Winnipeg, Manitoba, the unit began recruiting in the autumn of 1916 in that city. The unit was absorbed into the 249th Battalion, CEF while still in Canada. The 250th Battalion, CEF had one Officer Commanding: Lieut-Col. W. H. Hastings.
