= Endre Johannes Cleven =

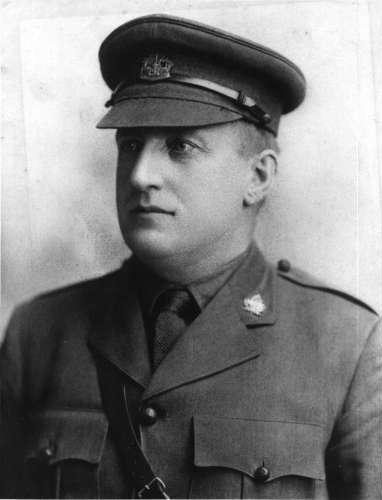
Endre Johannes Cleven Portrait photo taken in Canadian Expeditionary Force officers' uniform.

Endre Johannes Cleven (May 8, 1874 – July 3, 1916) was a Norwegian-born American Canadian who was prominent in the settlement and culture of Norwegian immigrants in Manitoba, Canada, during the early 20th century.

== Life ==
(The following is based on a Norwegian-language article in Decorah Posten, a newspaper for Scandinavian immigrants once published in Decorah, Iowa. The paragraph relating to his photography has been added.)

Cleven was the youngest of seven siblings, was born in Skudenes Municipality, Norway to Ingebjorg and Johannes Kleven. Johannes Kleven was a music teacher in Skudeneshavn, one of the main settlements in Skudenes Municipality which was located on the island of Karmøy in Stavanger amt (county). Cleven studied music under his father during his childhood, but was not able to pursue a musical education when his father's death, when Cleven was nine, left the family in poverty. Cleven attended public school and, at the age of fourteen, began working as a ship hand, where he cooked food for sailors and was frequently beaten for minor misdemeanors. To escape the hardships of the fishing life he moved to the United States at the age of seventeen and settled in Inwood, Iowa, where he lived for several years before moving to New York City in 1893 to pursue further opportunities.

Cleven worked at the Columbia Hospital in New York City between 1893 and 1899; during this time, he studied music with Professor Brunker, who was also a personal friend of Cleven and also noted within the Norwegian community. Cleven became a maestro at violin and was active at boxing and wrestling and also became a personal acquaintance of the boxer Bob Fitzsimmons. In 1899, Cleven enlisted in the US Army during the Spanish–American War and was stationed in the Philippines as part of the 203rd New York Volunteer Infantry, eventually being promoted to sergeant in the US Army Musical Corps. After the war had ended, Cleven returned to Norway to visit his family, travelling via Japan, India, China, the Suez Canal and other countries along the way.

Cleven returned to Canada and re-settled in Winnipeg, Manitoba in April 1903 and began work as a photographer and musician. He married Margit Hoines, daughter of Lars Aadnesen Hoines and Maria Vaula of Skudenes, in a Lutheran ceremony on September 7, 1904. The couple had met during Cleven's return to Norway. Together they had six children: daughters Judith Camilla (who died in infancy) and Lillian and sons Endre, Harald, Alf and Odvar.

Cleven began working with the Norwegian-Canadian community shortly after his return to Canada, participating in inviting Norwegians to immigrate and helping to start the "Nord Mannslaget" (Normannalaget) in modern Norwegian, a Norwegian-Canadian society. He started a mixed choir and was its conductor. For many years he was the president of the Musicians Union, and one of the organizers of the city Musicians' Club. He played the violin and bass violin at the Walker Theatre Orchestra and later at the Orpheum Theatre in Winnipeg.

An accomplished photographer, Cleven was among Canada's earliest commercial producers of real photo postcard images. He produced many postcards depicting scenes and buildings in Winnipeg as well as views of the beachgoers and boaters in the summer resorts of Lake Winnipeg. These postcards, which are widely collected today, date mainly if not exclusively from the years 1905 and 1906. Cleven was perhaps the most serious rival to Winnipeg's pre-eminent postcard photographer of the period, George A. Barrowclough.

In January 1912, the Canadian government commissioned Cleven to be in charge of Canada's Scandinavian settlement program. During this time, he had an office in Winnipeg and travelled throughout the United States and Canada to further the settlement of Manitoba by Norwegians.

After the outbreak of the First World War, Cleven, ranked Captain, was appointed as the leader of three Norwegian-Canadians who were intent on organizing the 197th Battalion ("The Vikings of Canada") of the Canadian Expeditionary Force. Endre's motive and the impetus for the battalion's formation was that he was concerned about the possibility of Norwegians not being seen as loyal Canadians in wartime.

While travelling to Camp Hughes (a temporary camp in Manitoba) in order to arrange for a summer camp that was to be the battalion's first muster, Cleven died after the car he was travelling in ran into a ditch near Portage la Prairie, Manitoba. He was the only one of the three on board to die, and ironically the most important to the future of the battalion. Cleven was buried with full military honours. His funeral was the first military funeral held in Winnipeg after the outbreak of the First World War. His death was described as a "hard blow" to the Norwegian-Canadian community.

== See also ==
- 197th Battalion (Vikings of Canada), CEF
