= 225th Division =

225th Division may refer to:

- 225th Infantry Division (Wehrmacht), Germany
- 225th Coastal Division, Italy
- 225th Division (Imperial Japanese Army)
- 225th Rifle Division, Soviet Union

== See also ==
- List of military divisions by number
- 225th Brigade (disambiguation)
- 225th Regiment (disambiguation)
- 225th (disambiguation)
