= 45th Battalion (Manitoba), CEF =

Canadian infantry battalion

The 45th Battalion (Manitoba), CEF, was an infantry battalion of the Canadian Expeditionary Force during the Great War.

== History ==
The 45th Battalion was authorized on 7 November 1914, embarked for Britain on 13 March 1916 aboard the SS Lapland and disembarked at Folkestone Harbour on 23 March 1916. The battalion was stationed at Shorncliffe Army Camp, and provided reinforcements to the Canadian Corps in the field until it was absorbed by the 11th Reserve Battalion, CEF on 6 July 1916. The battalion was disbanded on 17 July 1917.

The 45th Battalion recruited throughout Manitoba and was mobilized at Brandon, Manitoba.

The 45th Battalion was commanded by Lt.Col. F.J. Clarke from 17 March 1916 to 13 July 1916.

The 45th Battalion was awarded the battle honour THE GREAT WAR 1916.

== Perpetuation ==
The 45th Battalion (Manitoba), CEF, is perpetuated by The 26th Field Artillery Regiment, Royal Canadian Artillery.

== See also ==
- List of infantry battalions in the Canadian Expeditionary Force

== Sources ==
- Canadian Expeditionary Force 1914-1919 by Col. G.W.L. Nicholson, CD, Queen's Printer, Ottawa, Ontario, 1962
