= 149th Battalion (Lambtons), CEF =

Canadian military unit (1915–1917)

The 149th Battalion, CEF was a unit in the Canadian Expeditionary Force during the First World War. Based in Watford, Ontario, the unit began recruiting throughout Lambton County in late 1915. After sailing to England in March 1917, the battalion was absorbed into the 4th and 25th Reserve Battalions on April 8, 1917. The 149th Battalion, CEF had one Officer Commanding: Major W. W. Macvicar.

== Bibliography ==
- Meek, John F. Over the Top! The Canadian Infantry in the First World War. Orangeville, Ont.: The Author, 1971.
