= 153rd (Wellington) Battalion, CEF =

Canadian military unit during World War I

153rd "Overseas" Battalion, CEF
- Active: 1915–1917
- Country: Canada
- Branch: Canadian Expeditionary Force
- Type: Infantry
- Mobilization headquarters: Guelph
- Motto: Virtutis fortuna comes (Latin for 'Fortune favours the brave')
- Battle honours: The Great War, 1917

Commanders
- Officer commanding: LCol R. T. Pritchard

The 153rd (Wellington) Battalion, CEF, was a unit in the Canadian Expeditionary Force during the First World War. Based in Guelph, Ontario, the unit began recruiting in late 1915 in Wellington County. On 6 October 1916 in Guelph, regimental colours were presented featuring the crest of Arthur Wellesley, 4th Duke of Wellington, and the battalion motto Virtutis fortuna comes (Latin for 'Fortune favours the brave'). After sailing to England in April 1917, the battalion was absorbed into the 4th and 25th Reserve Battalions on May 7, 1917. The 153rd Battalion had one officer commanding: Lieutenant-Colonel R. T. Pritchard. He died near his hometown of Fergus in 1955 and is interred at Belsyde Cemetery.

The perpetuation of the battalion was held by the Wellington Regiment, which was disbanded in 1936. In 1929, the 153rd Battalion was awarded the theatre of war honour "The Great War, 1917". The perpetuation was reassigned to the 26th Field Battery, RCA, which is no longer extant.
