= 197th Battalion (Vikings of Canada), CEF =

The 197th (Vikings of Canada) Battalion, CEF was a unit in the Canadian Expeditionary Force during the First World War. Based in Winnipeg, Manitoba, the unit began recruiting during the winter of 1915/16 throughout western Canada. After sailing to England in January 1917, the battalion was absorbed into the 11th Reserve Battalion (Manitoba), CEF on February 6, 1917. The 197th (Vikings of Canada) Battalion, CEF had one Officer Commanding: Lieut-Col. H. G. Fonseca.

== See also ==
- Endre Johannes Cleven (Founder and Honorary Captain)
- 223rd Battalion (Canadian Scandinavians), CEF
