= NGC 225 =

Open cluster in the constellation Cassiopeia

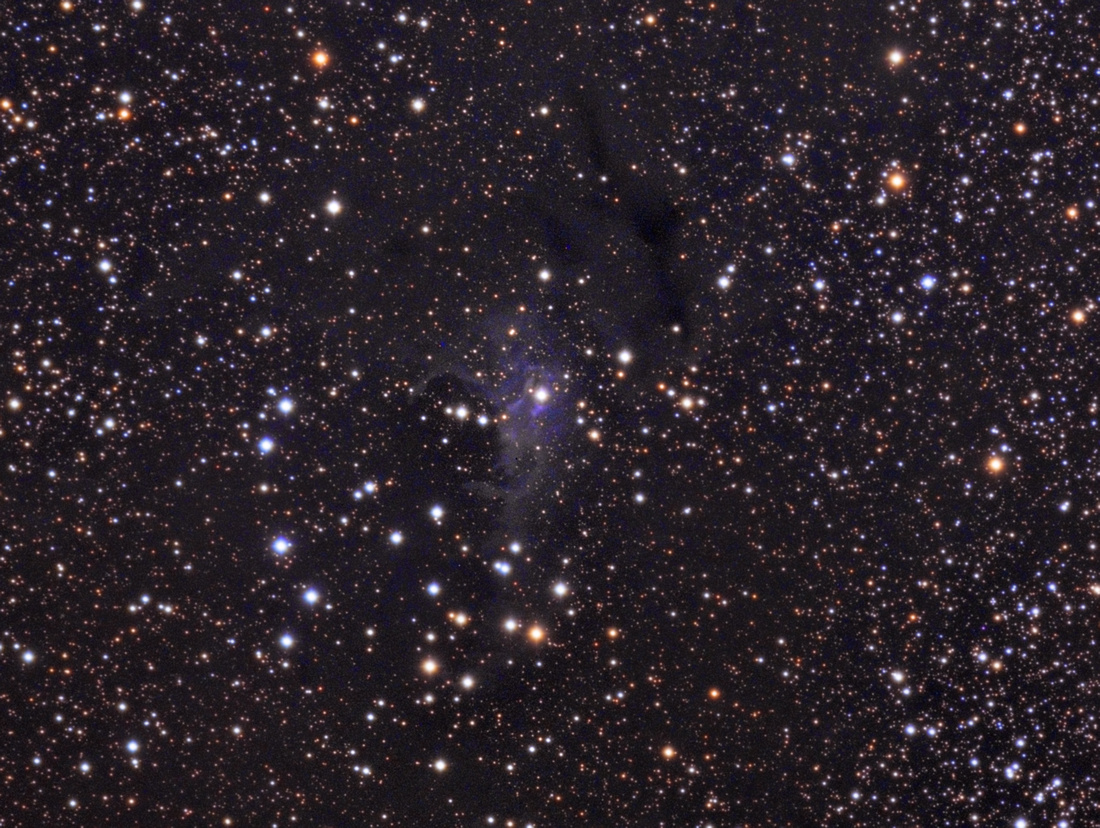
- NGC 225 in Cassiopeia

Observation data (J2000 epoch)
- Right ascension: 00^{h} 43.7^{m}
- Declination: +61° 47′
- Distance: 2200 ly (676 pc)
- Apparent magnitude (V): 7.0
- Apparent dimensions (V): 15′

Physical characteristics
- Image
- Other designations: Cr 7, C 0040+615

Associations
- Constellation: Cassiopeia

NGC 225 is an open cluster in the constellation Cassiopeia. It is located roughly 2,200 light-years from Earth. It is about 100 to 150 million years old.

The binary fraction, or the fraction of stars that are multiple stars, is 0.52.

== See also ==
- Open cluster
- List of NGC objects (1–1000)
- Cassiopeia (constellation)
