= 79th Battalion (Manitoba), CEF =

Canadian infantry battalion

The 79th Battalion (Manitoba), CEF was an infantry battalion of the Canadian Expeditionary Force during the Great War.

== History ==
The 79th Battalion was authorized on 10 July 1915 and embarked for Britain on 24 April 1916. The battalion provided reinforcements to the Canadian Corps until it was absorbed by the 17th Reserve Battalion, CEF on 12 July 1916. The battalion was subsequently disbanded on 12 October 1917.

It recruited throughout Manitoba and was mobilized at Brandon, Manitoba.

The battalion was commanded by Lt.-Col. G. Clingan from 25 April 1916 to 12 July 1916.

== Award ==
It was awarded the battle honour THE GREAT WAR 1916.

The battalion is perpetuated by the 26th Field Artillery Regiment, RCA.
