= 252nd Battalion (Lindsay), CEF =

Canadian WW1 military battalion

The 252nd (Lindsay) Battalion, CEF was a unit in the Canadian Expeditionary Force during the First World War. Based in Lindsay, Ontario, the unit began recruiting in the autumn of 1916 in Victoria and Haliburton. After sailing to England in June 1917, the battalion was absorbed into the 6th Reserve Battalion, CEF upon arrival. The 252nd (Lindsay) Battalion, CEF had two Officer Commanding: Major G. J. Thomson and Lieut-Col. J. J. Glass.
