= 221st Battalion, CEF =

The 221st Battalion, CEF was a unit in the Canadian Expeditionary Force during the First World War. Based in Winnipeg, Manitoba, the unit began recruiting in early 1916 in that city. After sailing to England in April 1917, the battalion was absorbed into the 11th Reserve Battalion (Manitoba), CEF on April 29, 1917. The 221st Battalion, CEF had one Officer Commanding: Lieut-Col. V. A. V. McMeans.
