= 70th Battalion, CEF =

Canadian infantry battalion

The 70th Battalion, CEF, was an infantry battalion of the Canadian Expeditionary Force. The battalion was authorized on 15 August 1915 and recruited in the Ontario counties of Essex, Kent, Lambton and Middlesex. The 70th Battalion embarked for Britain on 25 April 1916, where it provided reinforcements to the Canadian Corps in the field until 7 July 1916, when its personnel were absorbed the 39th Battalion, CEF.

The 70th Battalion, CEF, had one Officer Commanding, Lt.-Col. R.I. Towers, 25 April 1916 to 6 July 1916.

The 70th Battalion was awarded the battle honour THE GREAT WAR 1916.

The 70th Battalion, CEF, is perpetuated by the 26th Field Battery, RCA.

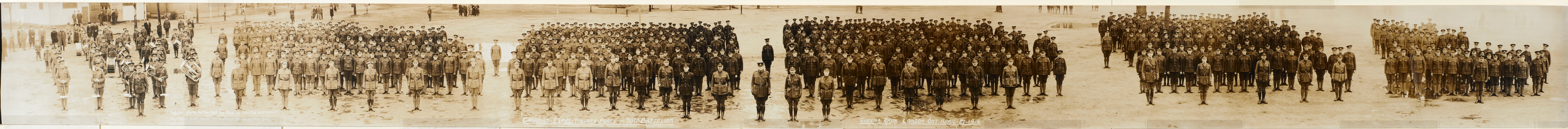
