= 225th Anti-aircraft Missile Regiment =

- 225-й зенітний ракетний полк
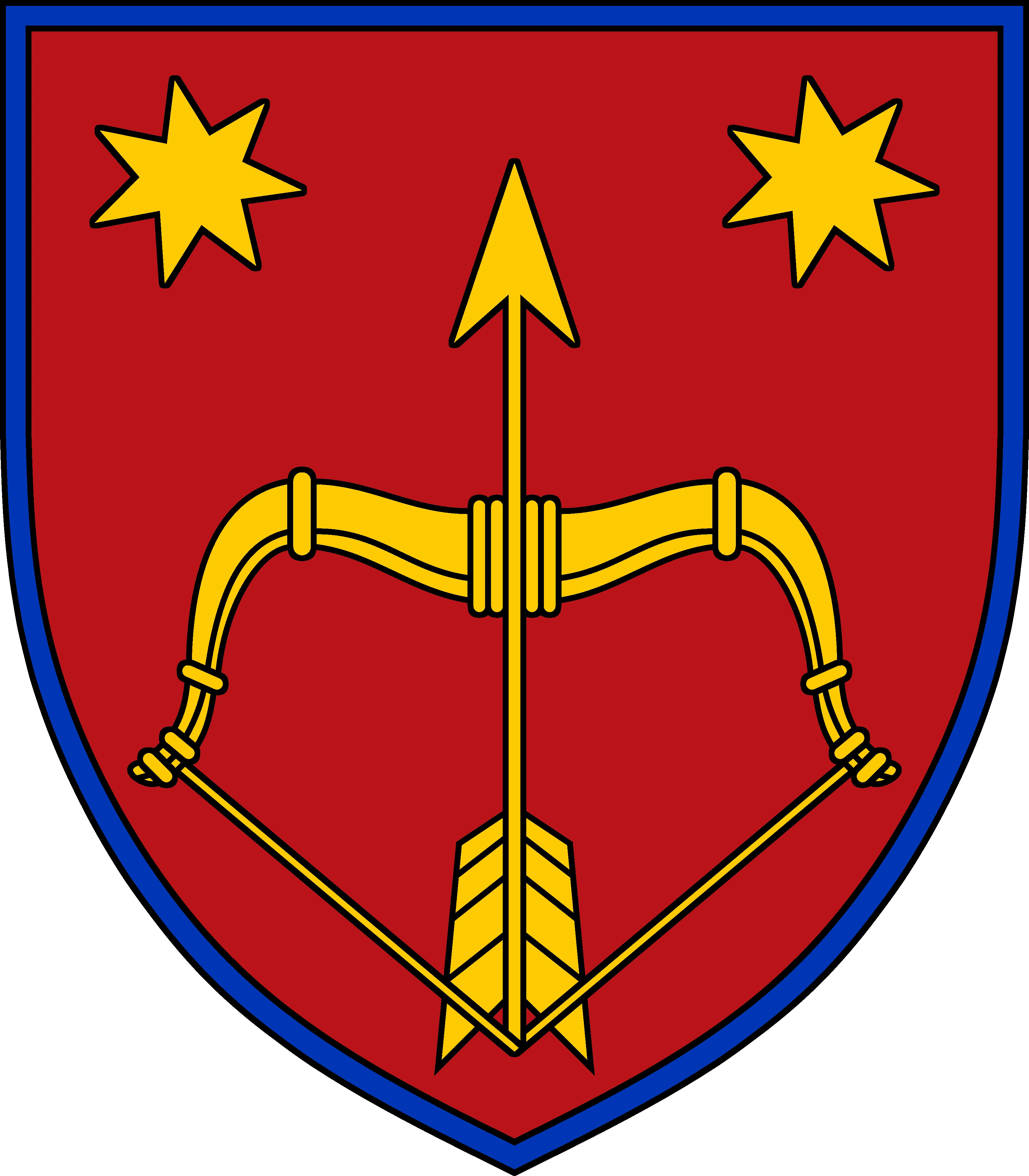
- Unit insignia
- Active: 2022 – present
- Country: Ukraine
- Allegiance: Ukraine
- Branch: Ukrainian Air Force
- Type: Missile
- Role: Anti-Aircraft
- Part of: Air Command East
- Garrison/HQ: Poltava
- Anniversaries: 25 October
- Equipment: Various Unspecified Anti-aircraft Missile Systems
- Engagements: Russo-Ukrainian war: Russian invasion of Ukraine

Commanders
- Current commander: Colonel Valery Machenko

Insignia
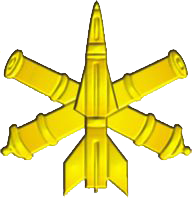
- Collar Insignia

The 225th Anti-aircraft Missile Regiment is a regiment of the Ukrainian Air Force tasked with air defense operations throughout Poltava Oblast. It operates a vast arsenal of different missile systems and is subordinated to the Air Command East. It is headquartered at Poltava.

== History ==
The 225th Anti-aircraft Missile Regiment was established on 25 October 2022 as a new regiment of the Air Command East to strengthen the air defense in Poltava Oblast. Its major objectives are the carrying out of combat missions to provide air defense to groupings of troops, critical infrastructure, administrative and industrial hubs and facilities in eastern Ukraine. The regiment is also known to perform law enforcement task in Poltava.

During the first year of the regiment's participation in the Russian invasion of Ukraine, it showed exceptional capabilities destroying more than 55 Russian targets including two fixed wing aircraft, six rotor wing aircraft, some cruise missiles and dozens of Unmanned Aerial Vehicles.

On 4 August 2024, the regiment received a combat flag from the president of Ukraine.

== Commanders ==
- Colonel Valery Mashchenko (2022-)

== Sources ==
- Сьогодні рівно рік, як створено Полтавський ЗРП
