= 58th Battalion, CEF =

Canadian infantry battalion

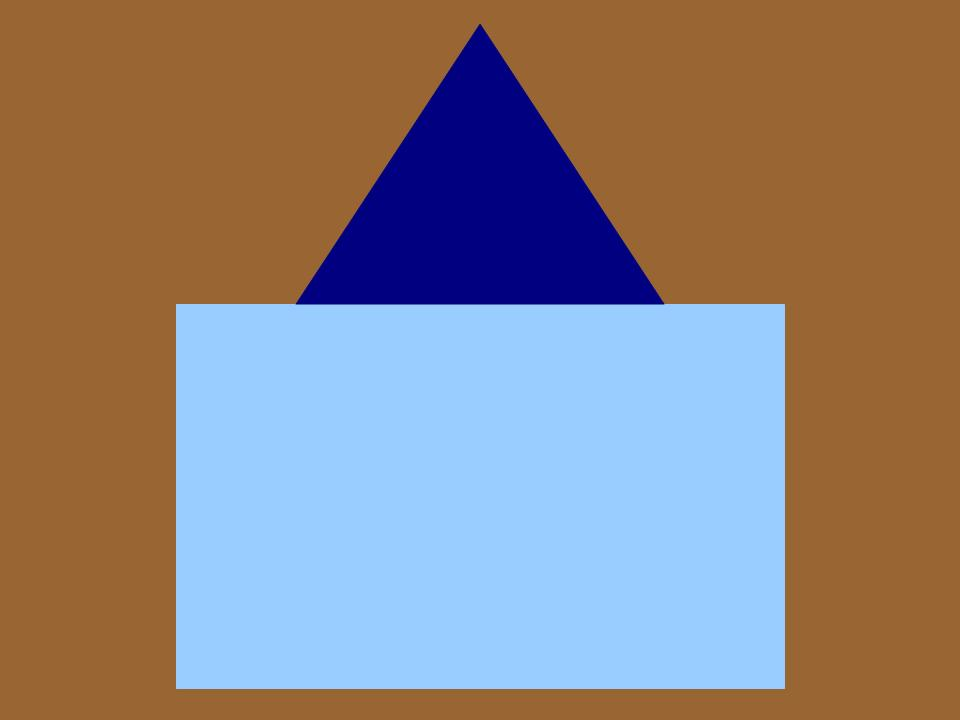
The distinguishing patch of the 58th Battalion, CEF.

The 58th Battalion, CEF was an infantry battalion of the Canadian Expeditionary Force during the First World War.

== History ==
The battalion was authorized on 20 April 1915. The battalion recruited in central Ontario and was mobilized at Niagara-on-the-Lake, Ontario. It embarked for Great Britain on 22 November 1915. It disembarked in France on 22 February 1916, where it fought as part of the 9th Infantry Brigade, 3rd Canadian Division in France and Flanders until the end of the war.

Corporal Harry Miner of the 58th Battalion was posthumously awarded the Victoria Cross for his actions on 8 August 1918 at Demuin, France, during the Battle of Amiens, the start of the Hundred Days Offensive.

The battalion was disbanded on 15 September 1920.

== Perpetuation ==
The 58th Battalion, CEF was first perpetuated by The Royal Grenadiers. In 1936, after the regiment was amalgamated with The Toronto Regiment, the perpetuation is now continued by The Royal Regiment of Canada .

== Commanding Officers ==
The 58th Battalion had two Officers Commanding:

- Lt.-Col. H.J. Genet, DSO, 22 November 1915 – 11 January 1918
- Lt.-Col. R.A. McFarlane, DSO, 12 January 1918-Demobilization

== Battle honours ==
The 58th Battalion was awarded the following battle honours:

- MOUNT SORREL
- SOMME, 1916
- Flers-Courcelette
- Ancre Heights
- ARRAS, 1917, '18
- Vimy, 1917
- HILL 70
- Ypres 1917
- Passchendaele
- AMIENS
- Scarpe, 1918
- Drocourt-Quéant
- HINDENBURG LINE
- Canal du Nord
- Cambrai, 1918
- PURSUIT TO MONS
- FRANCE AND FLANDERS, 1916-18

== See also ==
- List of infantry battalions in the Canadian Expeditionary Force
