= Flight 243 =

Flight 243 may refer to:

Listed chronologically

- Aloha Airlines Flight 243, suffered an explosive decompression on 28 April 1988
- Windjet Flight 243, landed short of runway on 24 September 2010
- RusAir Flight 243, crashed on 20 June 2011

== See also ==
- No. 243 Squadron RAF, which may be incorrectly called a "flight" instead of a "squadron"
