= 223rd Battalion (Canadian Scandinavians), CEF =

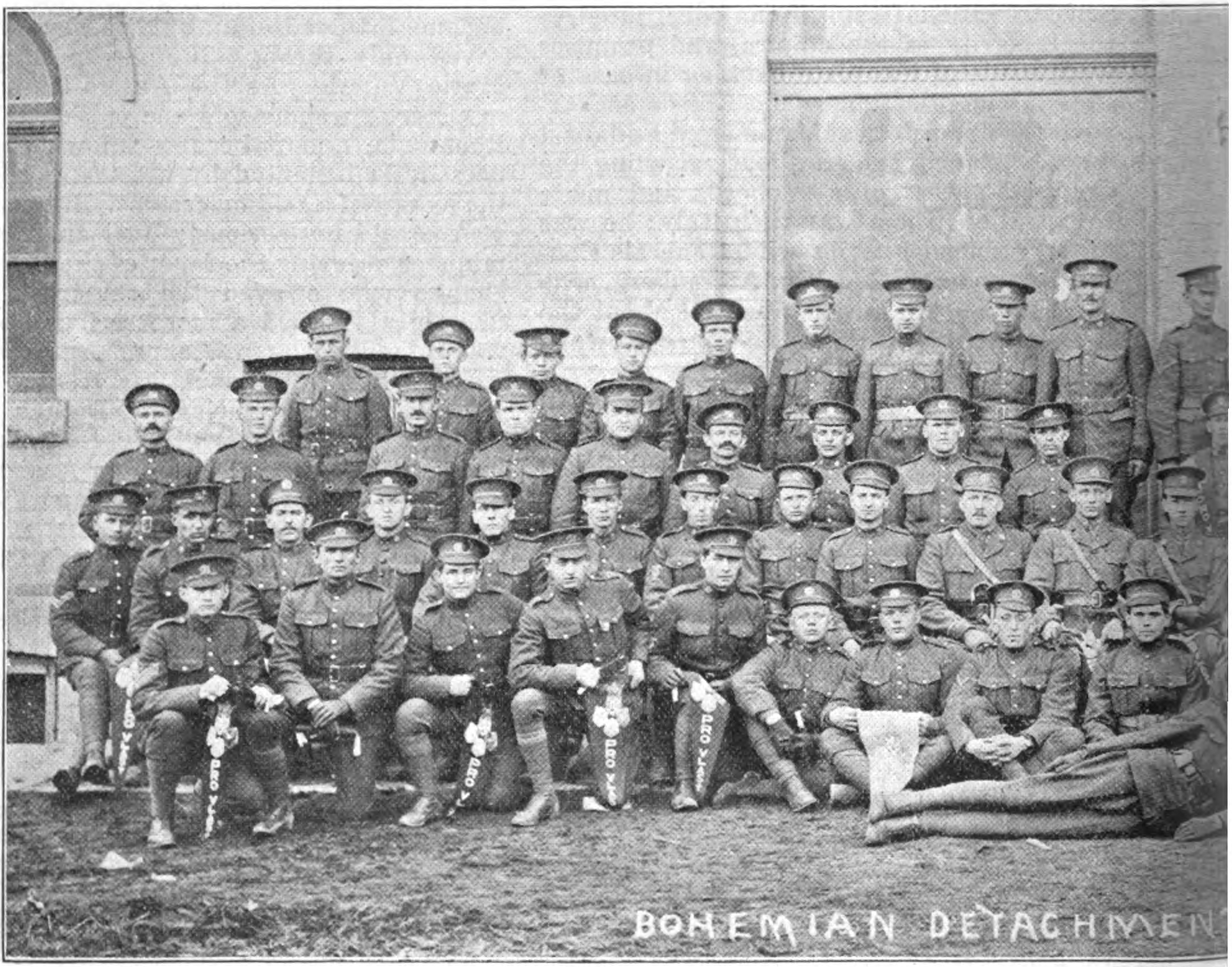

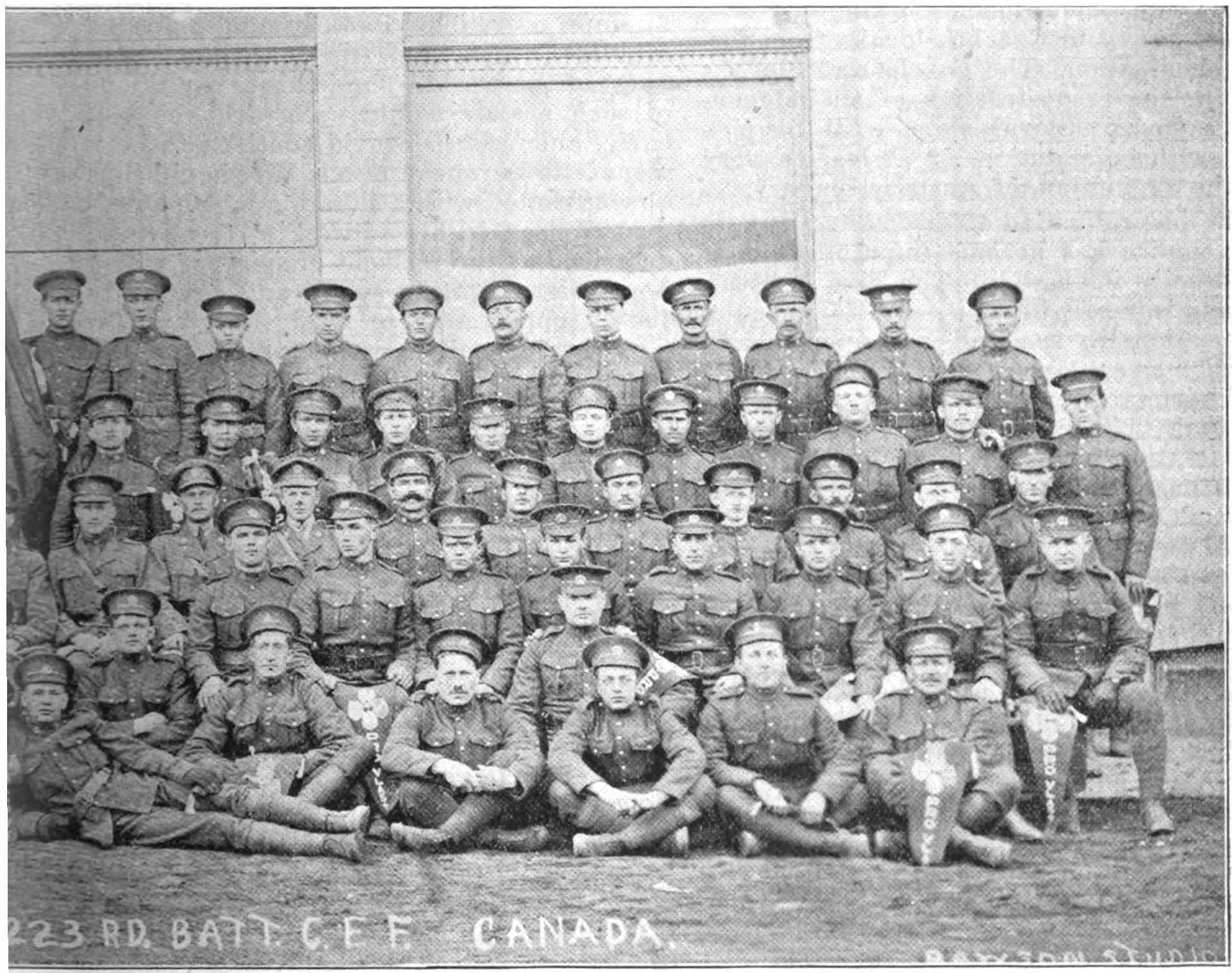

Soldiers of the Bohemian detachment of the 223rd Battalion, CEF

The 223rd (Scandinavians) Battalion, CEF was a unit in the Canadian Expeditionary Force during the First World War. Based in Winnipeg, Manitoba, the unit began recruiting in early 1916 in Military Districts 10, 11, 12, and 13. After sailing to England in May 1917, the battalion was absorbed into the 11th Reserve Battalion on May 14, 1917. The 223rd (Scandinavians) Battalion, CEF had one Officer Commanding: Lieut-Col. H. M. Hannesson. The battalion also had the Bohemian detachment consisting of volunteers from among Czech emigrants to Canada and the United States, who were also allowed to carry their own red and white flag.

== See also ==
- 197th Battalion (Vikings of Canada), CEF
