= 54th Battalion (Kootenay), CEF =

Canadian infantry battalion

The distinguishing patch of the 54th Battalion (Kootenay), CEF.

The 54th Battalion (Kootenay), CEF, was an infantry battalion of the Canadian Expeditionary Force during the Great War.

== History ==
The 54th Battalion was authorized on 7 November 1914, embarked for Britain on 22 November 1915 and disembarked in France on 14 August 1916. It fought as part of the 11th Infantry Brigade, 4th Canadian Division in France and Flanders until the end of the war. The battalion was disbanded on 30 August 1920.

The 54th Battalion recruited in Southern British Columbia and was mobilized at Nelson, B.C.

The 54th Battalion had three Officers Commanding:

- Lt-Col A.G.H. Kemball, CB, DSO 22 November 1915 – 1 March 1917
- Lt.-Col. V.V. Harvey, DSO, 2 March 1917 – 24 August 1917
- Lt.-Col. A.B. Carey, CMG, DSO, 24 August 1917-Demobilization

== Battle honours ==
The 54th Battalion was awarded the following battle honours:

- SOMME, 1916
- Ancre Heights
- Ancre, 1916
- ARRAS, 1917, '18
- Vimy, 1917
- HILL 70
- Ypres 1917
- Passchendaele
- AMIENS
- Scarpe, 1918
- Drocourt-Quéant
- HINDENBURG LINE
- Canal du Nord
- VALENCIENNES
- SAMBRE
- FRANCE AND FLANDERS, 1916-18

== Perpetuation ==
The 54th Battalion (Kootenay), CEF, is perpetuated by The 24th Field Artillery Regiment, RCA, currently on the Supplementary Order of Battle.

== Notable people ==
- Harry Letson, Canadian Army Adjutant General in World War II

== See also ==
- List of infantry battalions in the Canadian Expeditionary Force

== Sources ==
Canadian Expeditionary Force 1914-1919 by Col. G.W.L. Nicholson, CD, Queen's Printer, Ottawa, Ontario, 1962
