= 251st Battalion (Good Fellows), CEF =

The 251st (Good Fellows) Battalion, CEF was a unit in the Canadian Expeditionary Force during the First World War. Based in Winnipeg, Manitoba, the unit began recruiting in the autumn of 1916 in Winnipeg and the surrounding district. According to Leek, the unit did not sail for, but "was partially absorbed by the 18th RESERVE Battalion; the remainder were absorbed by the 1st Depot Battalion, Manitoba Regiment". The 251st (Good Fellows) Battalion, CEF had one Officer Commanding: Lieut-Col. G. H. Nicholson.
