= 94th Battalion (New Ontario), CEF =

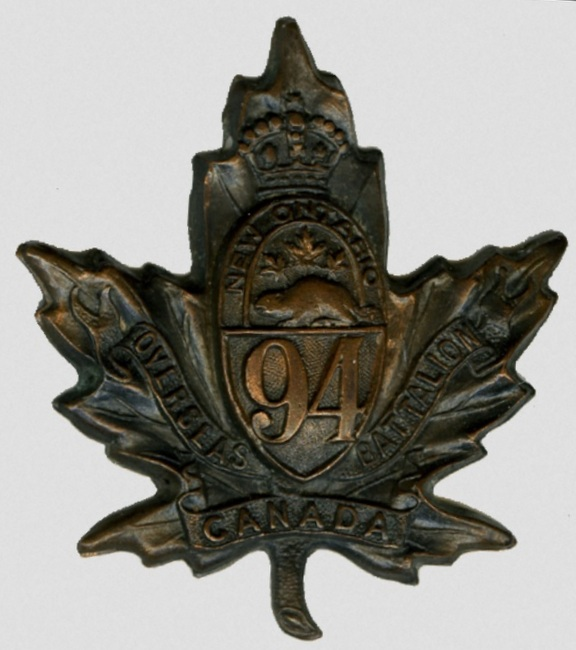
- Cap badge of the 94th Battalion
- Active: 22 December 1915–27 July 1918
- Country: Canada
- Branch: Canadian Expeditionary Force
- Type: Infantry
- Size: Battalion
- Garrison/HQ: Port Arthur, Ontario
- Engagements: World War I
- Battle honours: The Great War, 1916

The 94th Battalion (New Ontario), CEF, was an infantry battalion of the Great War Canadian Expeditionary Force. The 94th Battalion was authorized on 22 December 1915 and embarked for Britain on 28 June 1916, where, on 18 July 1916, its personnel were absorbed by the 17th Reserve Battalion and the 32nd Battalion, CEF, to provide reinforcements for the Canadian Corps in the field. The battalion disbanded on 27 July 1918.

The 94th Battalion recruited in Port Arthur, Fort William, Kenora, Rainy River, Fort Frances and Dryden, Ontario and was mobilized at Port Arthur.

The 94th Battalion was commanded by Lieutenant-Colonel H.A.C. Machin from 28 June 1916 to 18 July 1916.

The 94th Battalion was awarded the battle honour "The Great War, 1916".

In 1920 the perpetuation of battalion was assigned to the Lake Superior Regiment. A year later in 1921, the perpetuation was reassigned to the Kenora Light Infantry, which is now the 116th Independent Field Battery, RCA.

- 1920–1921: 2nd Battalion (94th Battalion, CEF), The Lake Superior Regiment
- 1921–1936: 1st Battalion (94th Battalion, CEF), The Kenora Light Infantry
- 1936–1940: 16th Medium Battery (Howitzer) and 17th Medium Battery (Howitzer), RCA
- 1940–1943: 16th (Reserve) Medium Battery (Howitzer) and 17th (Reserve) Medium Battery (Howitzer), RCA
- 1943–1946: 16th (Reserve) Medium Battery (Howitzer) and 16th/17th Medium Battery, RCA
- 1946–1965: 116th Medium Battery, RCA
- 1965–1981: 116th Field Battery, RCA
- 1981–present: 116th Independent Field Battery, RCA

== Sources ==
Canadian Expeditionary Force 1914–1919 by Col. G.W.L. Nicholson, CD, Queen's Printer, Ottawa, Ontario, 1962
