= 107th Battalion (Winnipeg), CEF =

A soldier from the 107th Battalion in Camp Hughes next to a sign featuring the unit's mascot.

The 107th Battalion (Winnipeg), CEF, also known as the "107th Timber Wolf Battalion," was initially an infantry battalion of the Great War Canadian Expeditionary Force before serving on the Western Front as a pioneer battalion. Known for its significant service by Indigenous Canadians, around 500 Indigenous Canadians (roughly half the unit) fought in the battalion.

== History ==
The Canadian government discouraged the recruitment of Indigenous Canadians and other non-white ethnic communities during the Great War. However, Glenlyon Campbell, a Canadian politician, lobbied Prime Minister Robert Borden and the Minister of Militia and Defence, Sam Hughes, for permission to create a unit for Indigenous Canadians. He was granted authorization to create his unit, known as the "107th Battalion," on November 4, 1915. The unit trained at Camp Hughes, Manitoba, in camps. The unit quickly embarked for Britain on September 19, 1916. The 107th Battalion recruited in, and was mobilized at, Winnipeg, Manitoba. It was converted to Pioneers and served in France and Flanders as the 107th Pioneer Battalion. The battalion disbanded on September 15, 1920.

The 107th Battalion was commanded by Lt.-Col. G. Campbell, DSO, from September 18, 1916, to October 9, 1917, and Lt.-Col. H.G. Walkem from October 9, 1917, to May 28, 1918.

=== Mascot ===
Due to its significance to several of the Indigenous soldiers, the Timber Wolf was used as the battalion's mascot.

== Battle honours ==
The 107th Battalion was awarded the following battle honours:

- ARRAS, 1917+
- Vimy, 1917, 9–14 April 1917+
- Arleux
- Scarpe, 1917,3–4 May 1917
- HILL 70, 15–25 August 1917+
- Ypres 1917, 31 July–10 November 1917
- Passchendaele, 12 October 1917 or 26 October–10 November 1917+
- Somme 1918
- FRANCE AND FLANDERS, 1917-18

== Perpetuation ==
The 107th Battalion (Winnipeg), CEF, is not perpetuated by the Canadian Army.

== See also ==
- List of infantry battalions in the Canadian Expeditionary Force

== Sources ==
- Canadian Expeditionary Force 1914–1919 by Col. G.W.L. Nicholson, CD, Queen's Printer, Ottawa, Ontario, 1962
