= 229th =

229th may refer to:

- 229th Brigade, United Kingdom
- 1st Battalion, 229th Aviation Regiment, an Attack Helicopter Battalion operating AH-64 Apaches attack and OH-58 Kiowa scout helicopters
- 229th (South Saskatchewan) Battalion, CEF, a unit in the Canadian Expeditionary Force during the First World War
- 2nd Battalion, 229th Aviation Regiment, the only United States Army Attack Helicopter unit in history to have captured enemy troops

== See also ==
- 229 (number)
- 229, the year 229 (CCXXIX) of the Julian calendar
- 229 BC
