= 135th (Middlesex) Battalion, CEF =

The 135th (Middlesex) Battalion, CEF was a unit in the Canadian Expeditionary Force during the First World War. Based in London, Ontario, the unit began recruiting in late 1915 in Middlesex County. After sailing to England in August 1916, the battalion was absorbed into the 116th, 125th and 134th Battalions as well as the 8th Reserve Battalion in October 1916. The 135th (Middlesex) Battalion, CEF had one Officer Commanding: Lieut-Col. B. Robson.

The 135th (Middlesex) Battalion, CEF was perpetuated by The Middlesex and Huron Regiment which was disbanded in 1946.

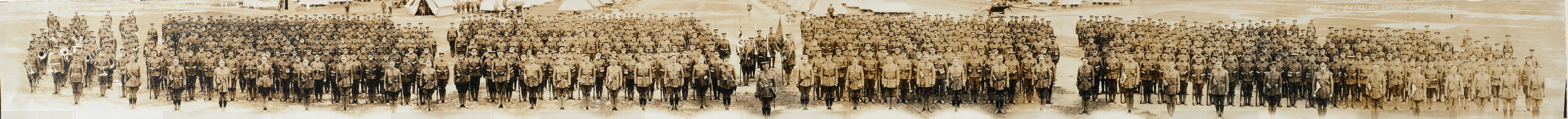
