= 24th Field Artillery Regiment, RCA =

24th Field Artillery Regiment, Royal Canadian Artillery
- Active: 1 May 1914–28 February 1965
- Country: Canada
- Branch: Canadian Militia (1914–1940); Canadian Army (1940–1965)
- Type: Field artillery
- Size: One Regiment
- Part of: Royal Regiment of Canadian Artillery
- Garrison/HQ: Trail, British Columbia
- Mottos: Ubique (Latin for 'Everywhere'); Quo fas et gloria ducunt (Latin for 'Whither right and glory lead')
- March: Quick: British Grenadiers

The 24th Field Artillery Regiment, Royal Canadian Artillery was a Canadian Army Reserve artillery regiment based in Trail, British Columbia. It was formed in 1936 when The Kootenay Regiment was converted from infantry to artillery. The regiment currently exists on the Supplementary Order of Battle.

== History ==
The Kootenay Regiment originated in Fernie, British Columbia, on 1 May 1914, when an eight-company regiment of infantry was authorized to be formed. It was designated the 107th (East Kootenay) Regiment on 2 November 1914.

The 54th Battalion (Kootenay), CEF, was authorized on 7 November 1914 and embarked for Britain on 22 November 1915, and disembarked in France on 14 August 1916. The 54th Battalion fought as part of the 11th Infantry Brigade, 4th Canadian Division in France and Flanders until the end of the war. The battalion was disbanded on 30 August 1920.

The 225th Battalion (Kootenay), CEF, was authorized on 15 July 1916 and embarked for Britain on 26 January 1917, where its personnel were absorbed by the 16th Reserve Battalion, CEF, on 6 February 1917 to provide reinforcements for the Canadian Corps in the field. The battalion was disbanded on 1 September 1917.

Following the Great War it was redesignated The Kootenay Regiment on 12 March 1920. On 15 December 1936 it was converted to artillery and redesignated the 24th (Kootenay) Field Brigade, RCA.

The Kootenay Regiment held the following battle honours. After conversion to artillery, these honours became dormant, being replaced by the RCA's honorary distinction Ubique.

- Mount Sorrel
- Somme, 1916 (Note: Authorized for emblazonment on regimental colours)
- Ancre Heights
- Ancre, 1916
- Arras, 1917, '18
- Vimy, 1917
- Hill 70
- Ypres, 1917
- Passchendaele
- Amiens
- Scarpe, 1918
- Drocourt–Quéant
- Hindenburg Line
- Canal du Nord
- Valenciennes
- Sambre
- France and Flanders, 1916–18

=== 24th Field Artillery Regiment, Royal Canadian Artillery ===
It was redesignated the 24th Reserve (Kootenay) Field Brigade, RCA, on 7 November 1940; the 24th Reserve (Kootenay) Field Regiment, RCA, on 15 March 1943; the 24th Field Regiment, RCA, on 1 April 1946; the 24th Heavy Anti- Aircraft Regiment, RCA, on 5 February 1948; the 24th Medium Anti-Aircraft Regiment, RCA, on 22 August 1955; the 24th Medium Anti-Aircraft Artillery Regiment, RCA, on 12 April 1960; and finally the 24th Field Artillery Regiment, RCA, on 10 December 1962.

The 24th Field Artillery Regiment, RCA, perpetuated the 54th Battalion (Kootenay), CEF and the 225th Battalion (Kootenay), CEF.

It was reduced to nil strength and transferred to the Supplementary Order of Battle on 28 February 1965.

=== Lineage chart ===
Lineage chart

1914	54th Bn, CEF	107th (East Kootenay) Regt
1916	225th "Overseas" Bn, CEF
1917	Absorbed by 16th Reserve Bn
1920	Disbanded	1st Bn (54th Bn, CEF), The Kootenay Regt	2nd Bn (225th Bn, CEF), (Note: Reserve) The Kootenay Regt
1936	24th (Kootenay) Fd Bde, RCA	Disbanded
1940	24th Reserve (Kootenay) Fd Bde, RCA
1943	24th Reserve (Kootenay) Fd Regt, RCA
1946	24th Fd Regt, RCA
1948	24th HAA Regt, RCA
1955	24th MAA Regt, RCA
1960	24th MAA Arty Regt, RCA
1962	24th Fd Arty Regt, RCA
1965	Supplementary Order of Battle

== Batteries ==
=== 24th (Kootenay) Field Brigade, RCA (5 December 1936) ===
- 107th Field Battery, RCA
- 117th Field Battery, RCA
- 109th Field Battery, RCA
- 108th Field Battery (Howitzer), RCA

=== 24th Field Regiment, RCA (1 April 1946) ===
- 107th Field Battery, RCA
- 109th Field Battery, RCA
- 111th Field Battery, RCA

=== 24th Medium Anti-Aircraft Regiment, RCA (22 August 1955) ===
- 109th Medium Anti-Aircraft Battery, RCA
- 111th Medium Anti-Aircraft Battery, RCA

=== 24th Field Artillery Regiment, RCA (10 December 1962) ===
- 109th Field Battery, RCA
- 111th Field Battery, RCA
