= Crouy-Saint-Pierre =

- Commune
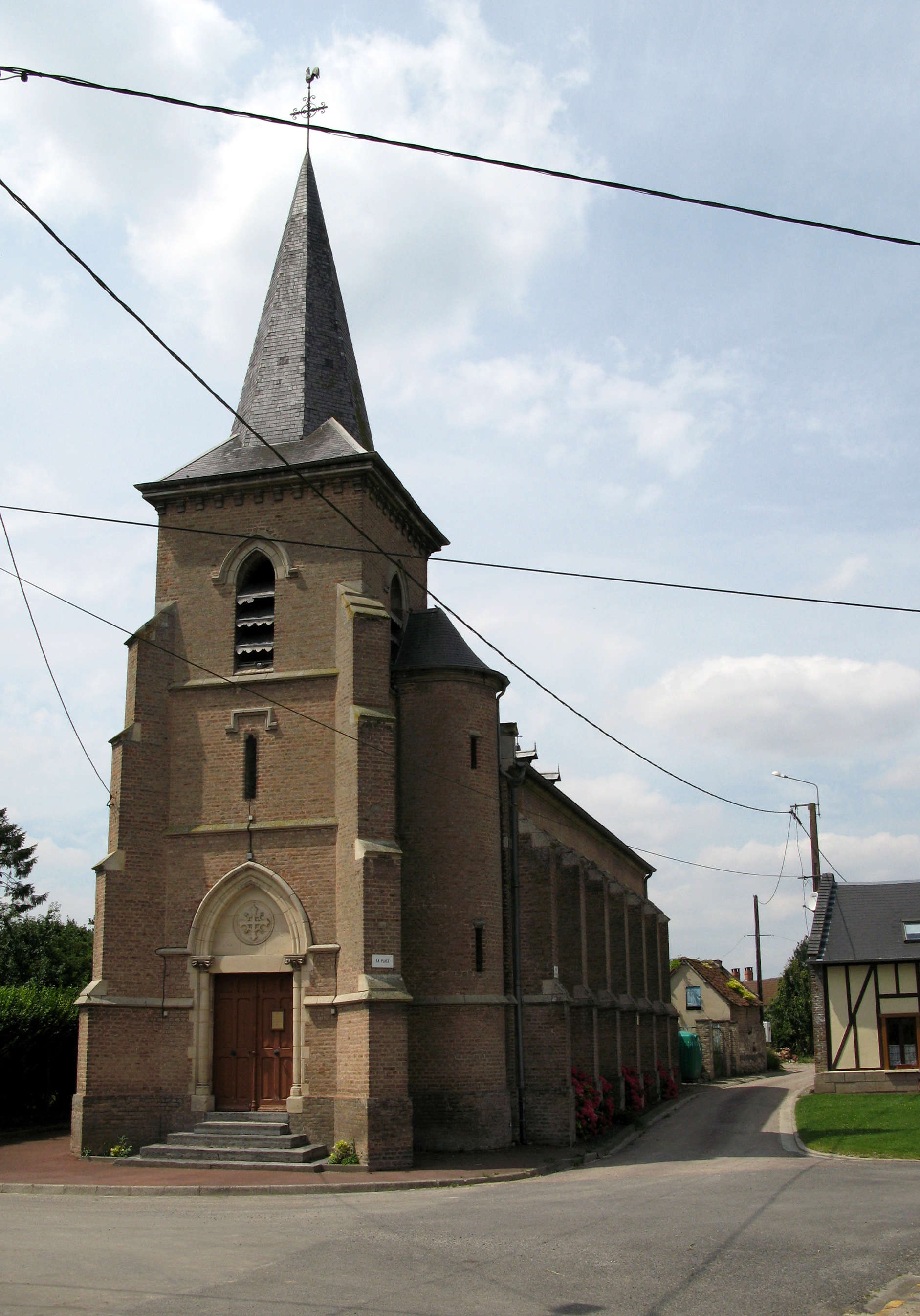
- The church in Crouy-Saint-Pierre

- Coat of arms
- Location of Crouy-Saint-Pierre
- Location within France Location within Hauts-de-France
- Coordinates: 49°58′12″N 2°05′19″E
- Country: France
- Region: Hauts-de-France
- Department: Somme
- Arrondissement: Amiens
- Canton: Ailly-sur-Somme
- Intercommunality: CC Nièvre et Somme

Government
  - Mayor (2020–2026): Régis Sinoquet
- Area^{1}: 10.51 km^{2} (4.06 sq mi)
- Elevation: 14 m (46 ft)
- Highest elevation: 96 m (315 ft)
- Lowest elevation: 10 m (33 ft)
- Population (2023): 374
  - Density: 35.6/km^{2} (92.2/sq mi)
- Time zone: UTC+01:00 (CET)
  - Summer (DST): UTC+02:00 (CEST)
- INSEE/Postal code: 80229 /80310
- ^{1} French Land Register data, which excludes lakes, ponds, glaciers > 1 km^{2} (0.386 sq mi or 247 acres) and river estuaries.

Crouy-Saint-Pierre (French pronunciation: [kʁui sɛ̃ pjɛʁ]) is a commune in the Somme department in Hauts-de-France in northern France.

== Geography ==
The commune is situated on the D3 road, on the banks of the river Somme, some 10 miles (16 km) northwest of Amiens.

== Places of interest ==
A Cistercian abbey, the Abbaye du Gard, founded in 1137 by Gérard de Picquigny, vidame of Amiens, lies within the boundaries of the commune.

== Population ==
Historical population
Year	Pop.	±% p.a.
1968	202	—
1975	228	+1.74%
1982	229	+0.06%
1990	285	+2.77%
1999	303	+0.68%
2007	331	+1.11%
2012	328	−0.18%
2017	346	+1.07%
2023	374	+1.31%
Source: INSEE

== See also ==
- Communes of the Somme department
