= 144th Battalion (Winnipeg Rifles), CEF =

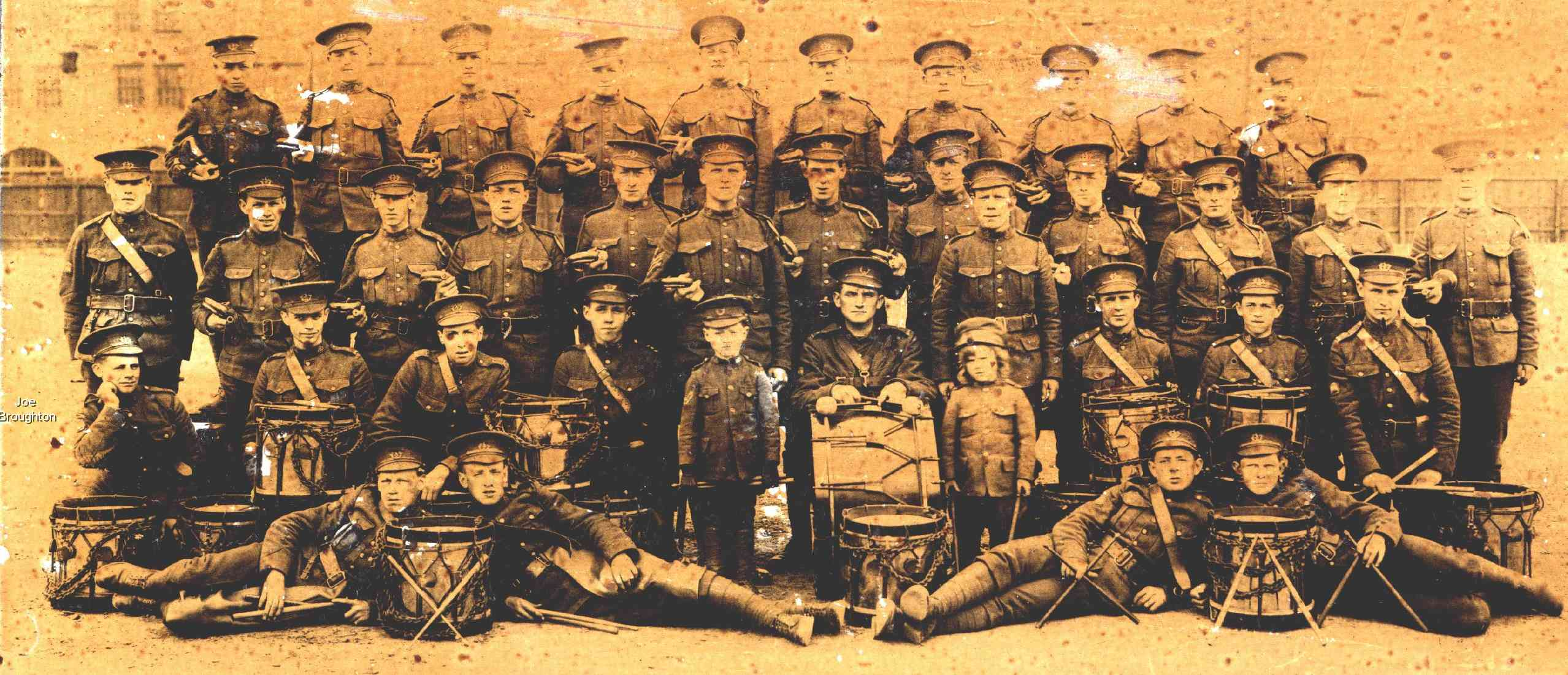
144th Bugle Band

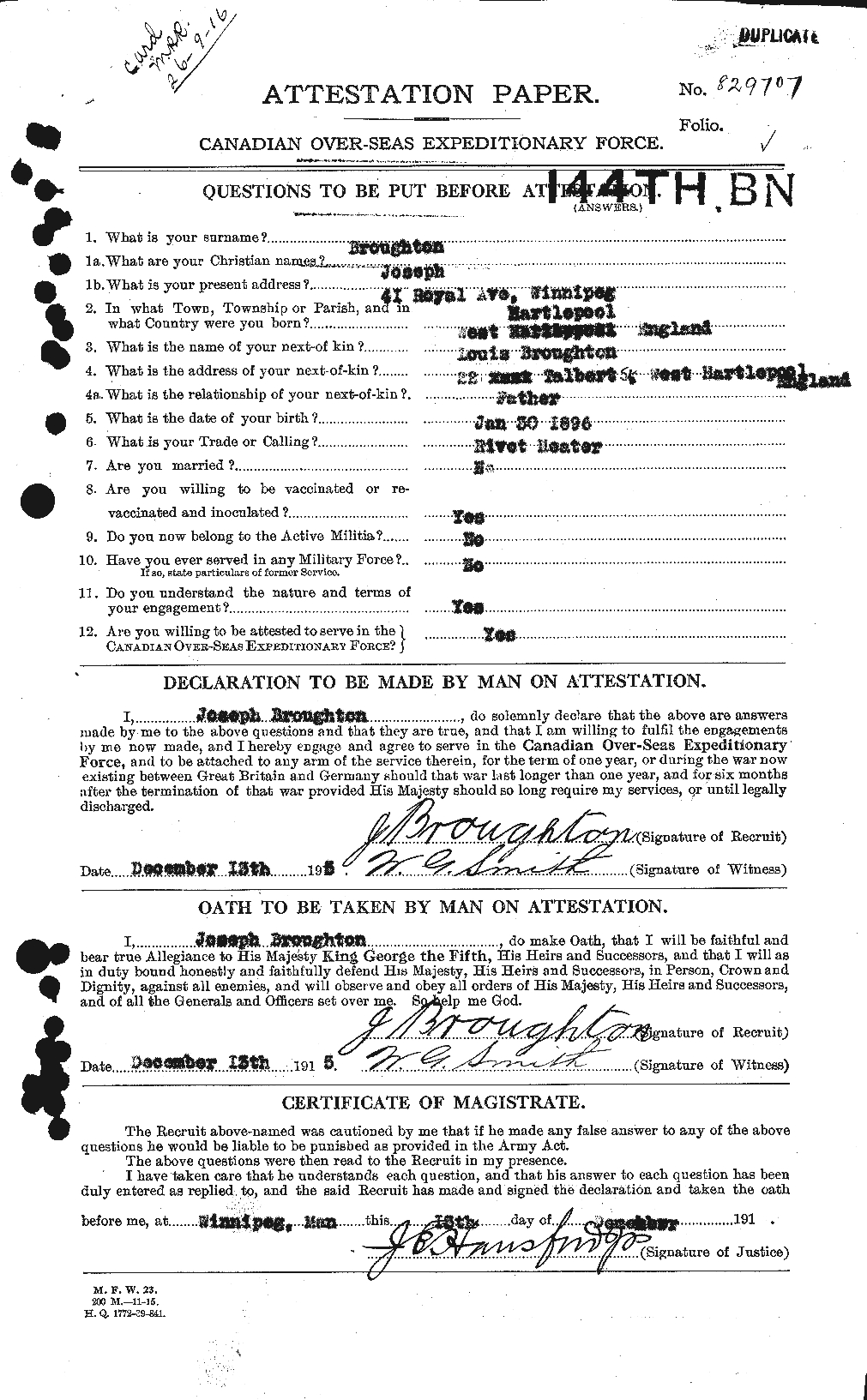
Attestation to 144th

The 144th Battalion (Winnipeg Rifles), CEF was a unit in the Canadian Expeditionary Force during the First World War. Based in Winnipeg, Manitoba, the unit began recruiting in late 1915 in that city. After sailing to England in September 1916, the battalion was absorbed into the 18th Reserve Battalion on January 12, 1917. The 144th (Winnipeg Rifles) Battalion, CEF had one Officer Commanding: Lieut-Col. A. W. Morley.

This battalion is perpetuated by the Royal Winnipeg Rifles.
