= 249th (Saskatchewan) Battalion, CEF =

The 249th Battalion, CEF, was a unit in the Canadian Expeditionary Force during the First World War. Based in Regina, Saskatchewan, the unit began recruiting in the autumn of 1916 throughout the province of Saskatchewan. After sailing to England in March 1918 (on board RMS Saxonia) the battalion was absorbed into the 15th Reserve Battalion, CEF, upon arrival. The 249th Battalion had one officer commanding: Lieutenant-Colonel C. B. Keenlyside.

The battalion's regimental colours were laid up at the Saskatchewan Legislative Building in 1919, and were transferred to St. Paul's Cathedral in 1977 along with the colours of several other battalions. The colours went into storage in when the cathedral underwent renovations in 2024, and in October 2026 they were again laid up in the rotunda of the Legislative Building.
