= 181st Battalion (Brandon), CEF =

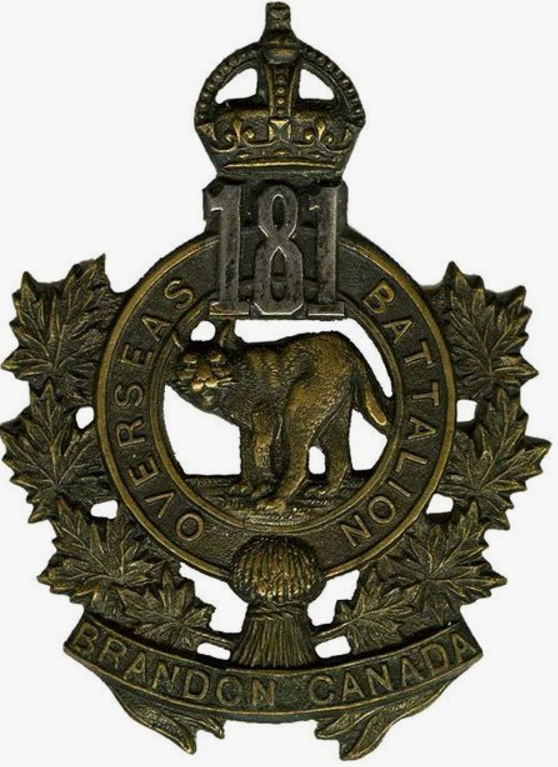
181st CEF Battalion Hat badge

The 181st Battalion (Brandon), CEF was a unit in the Canadian Expeditionary Force during World War I.

Based in Brandon, Manitoba, the unit began recruiting during the winter of 1915, 1916 and 1917 in that city and the surrounding district. The 181st CEF Battalion embarked on H.M.T. Grampian in Halifax on 16 April 1917. After sailing to Liverpool in England on 29 April 1917, the battalion was absorbed into the 18th Reserve Battalion on 29 April 1917 and was stationed in Dibgate Camp, Shorncliffe, England.

The 181st Battalion, CEF had one Officer Commanding: Lieut-Col. David Wilson Beaubier.

The 181st Battalion is perpetuated by the 26th Field Artillery Regiment, Royal Canadian Artillery.
