= 225th Brigade Support Battalion =

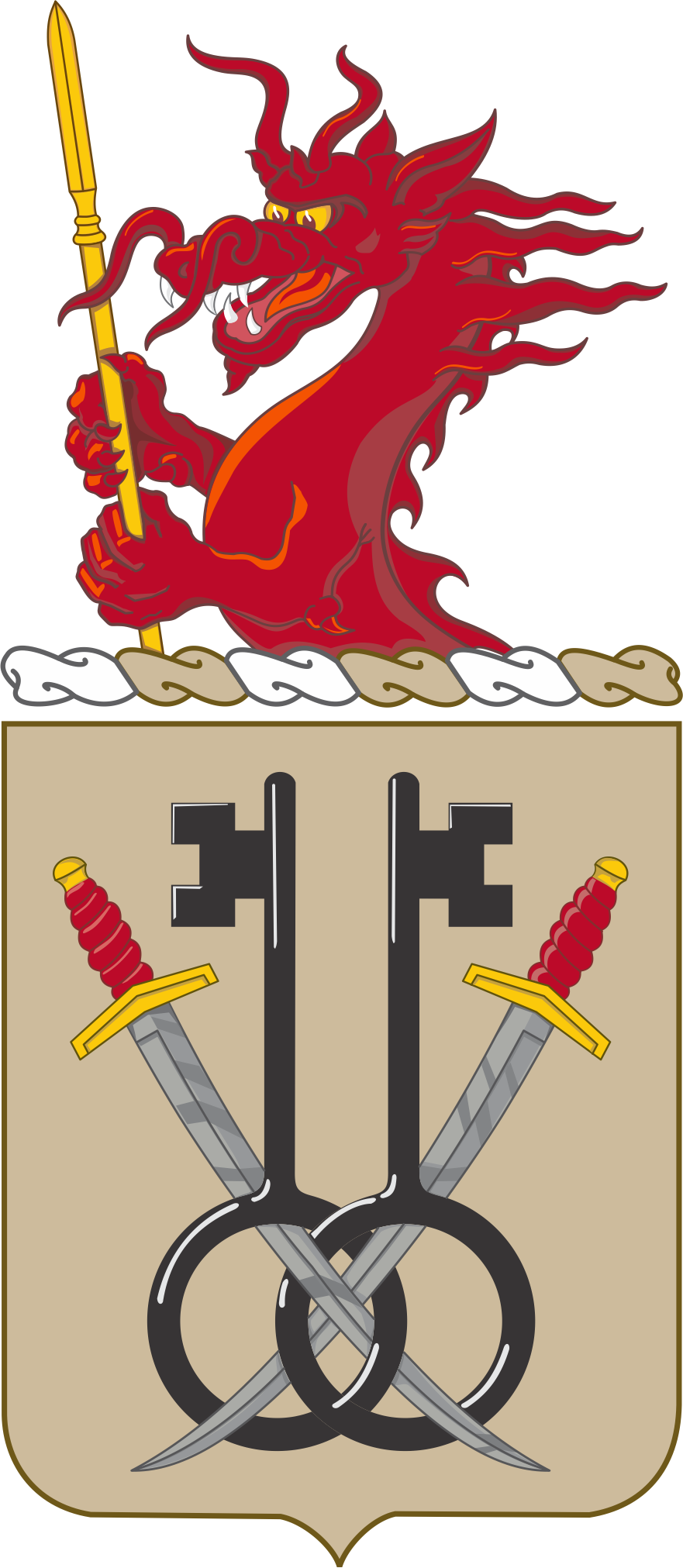
- Coat of Arms
- Active: 1971; 1992–present
- Country: United States
- Branch: U.S. Army
- Part of: 25th Infantry Division
- Garrison/HQ: Schofield Barracks
- Motto: Warrior Support
- Colors: Buff and Scarlet
- Mascot: Dragon
- Engagements: Vietnam War; Operation Iraqi Freedom

Insignia
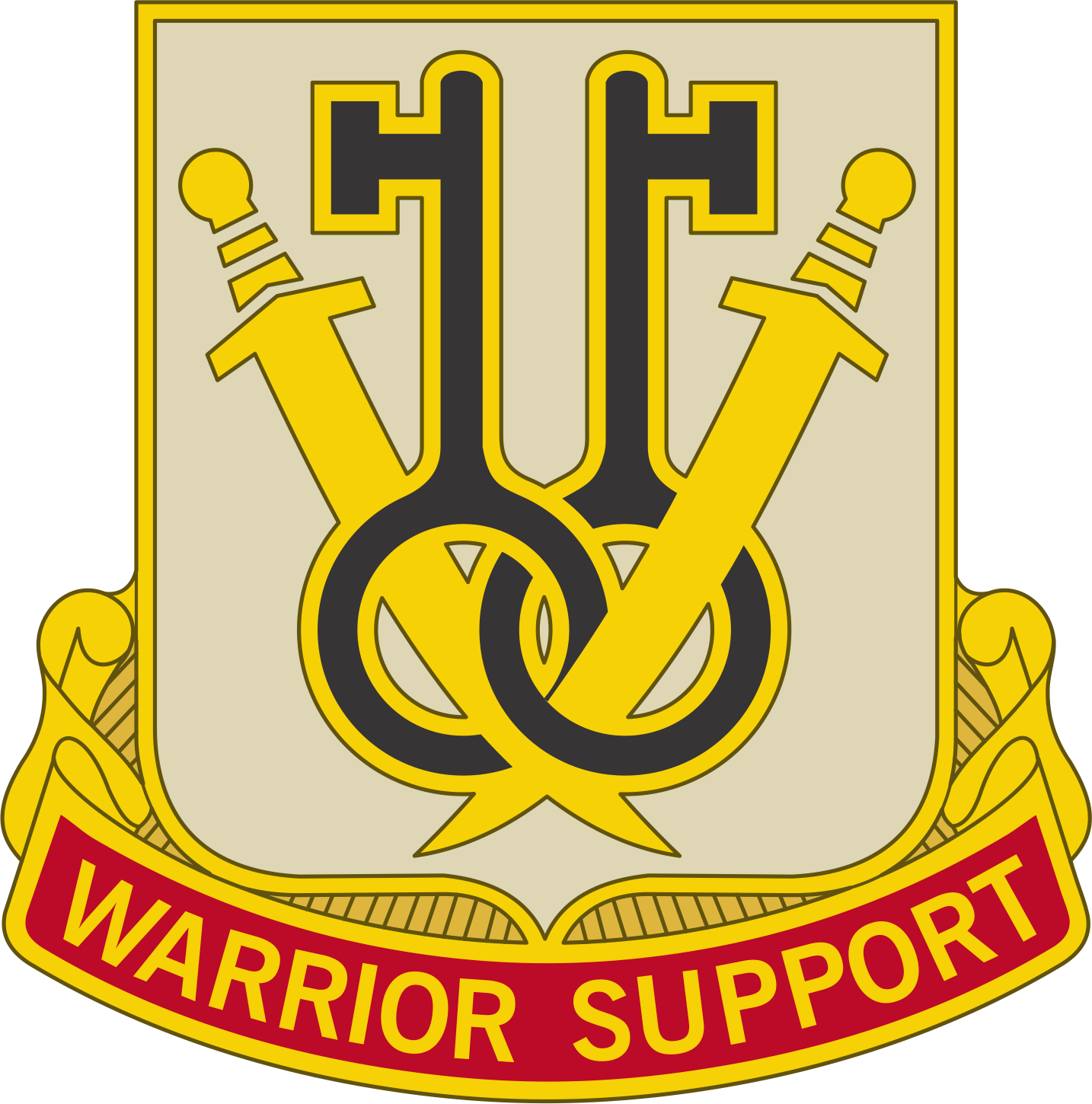
- Unit Crest

The 225th Brigade Support Battalion is a United States Army unit based at Schofield Barracks, Hawaii. It is part of the 2nd Infantry Brigade Combat Team, 25th Infantry Division.

The 225th Brigade Support Battalion traces its lineage to the 225th Combat Support Battalion, which was originally activated on 10 February 1971 in the Republic of Vietnam to provide direct support to the 2nd Brigade, 25th Infantry Division. Shortly after activation, the 2nd Brigade returned to Hawaiʻi and the battalion was deactivated before distinctive unit colors or a motto were officially authorized.

The battalion was later reestablished during the Army’s reorganization into modular support formations. Charlie Company, 25th Medical Battalion; Bravo Company, 725th Main Support Battalion; and the 2nd Forward Support Coordinator Staff, HHC, DISCOM were task-organized into the provisional 225th Forward Support Battalion. The unit trained with the 2nd Brigade, 25th Infantry Division during JRTC Rotation 91-5 at Fort Chaffee, Arkansas, before officially activating on 17 May 1991 as part of DISCOM, 25th Infantry Division (Light).

Since activation, the battalion has participated in numerous operations and training exercises throughout the Pacific and Southwest Asia. These include deployments to Pohakuloa Training Area on Hawaiʻi Island; Operation Garden Sweep on Kauaʻi following Hurricane Iniki; Team Spirit 1993 in South Korea; multiple JRTC rotations at Fort Polk, Louisiana; Operation Uphold Democracy in Haiti; Operation Marathon Pacific at Wake Island; Cobra Gold exercises in Thailand; SFOR 11 in Bosnia; and multiple deployments in support of Operation Iraqi Freedom and Operation New Dawn in Iraq.

During the 2010–2011 deployment to Iraq, the battalion operated from Forward Operating Base Warhorse in Diyala Province as part of the 2nd Advise and Assist Brigade, 25th Infantry Division. The deployment transitioned from Operation Iraqi Freedom to Operation New Dawn following the official end of OIF on 31 August 2010. Elements deployed included Headquarters and Headquarters Company (HHC), Alpha Company (Distribution), Bravo Company (Maintenance), and Charlie Company (Medical). The battalion conducted sustainment, maintenance, distribution, medical, and convoy support operations throughout the area of operations.

Following previous deployments to Iraq, the 225th Forward Support Battalion was redesignated as the 225th Brigade Support Battalion in accordance with the Army’s modular brigade transformation.

The battalion colors were officially authorized by the United States Institute of Heraldry on 1 October 1991. Buff and scarlet, colors traditionally associated with support organizations, are the primary colors of the unit. The coat of arms consists of a buff shield displaying two black keys addorsed and intertwined over crossed sabers with gold and scarlet handles. The battalion crest features a red oriental demi-dragon holding a spear, symbolizing service in Vietnam and combat readiness. The battalion motto is “Warrior Support.”

Today, the 225th Brigade Support Battalion serves as the sustainment battalion for the 2nd Infantry Brigade Combat Team, 25th Infantry Division. The battalion consists of Headquarters and Headquarters Company (HHC), Alpha Company (Distribution), Bravo Company (Maintenance), and Charlie Company (Medical).
