= 161st (Huron) Battalion, CEF =

The 161st (Huron) Battalion, CEF was a unit in the Canadian Expeditionary Force during the First World War. Based in London, Ontario, the unit began recruiting in late 1915 in Huron County. After sailing to England in November 1916, the battalion was absorbed into the 4th Reserve Battalion on February 15, 1918.

The 161st (Huron) Battalion, CEF had two Officer Commanding: Lieut-Col. H. B. Combe (October 30, 1916—May 16, 1917) and Lieut-Col. R. Murdie, DSO (June 28, 1917—February 23, 1918).

The 161st (Huron) Battalion, CEF was perpetuated by The Middlesex and Huron Regiment which was disbanded in 1946.

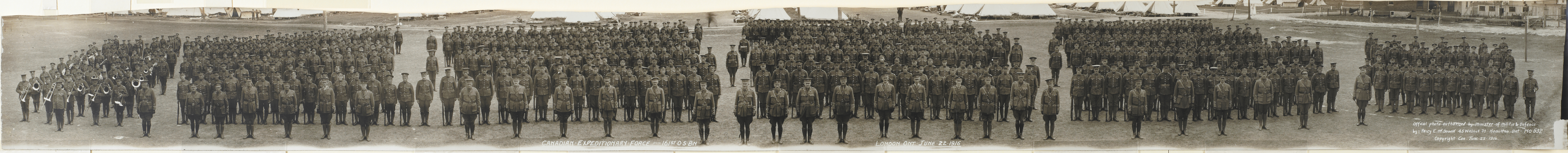
