= 116th Independent Field Battery, RCA =

116 Independent Field Battery, RCA
- 116^{e} Batterie autonome de campagne, ARC
- Active: 1 April 1908-present
- Country: Canada
- Branch: Army
- Type: Field artillery
- Size: One battery
- Part of: Royal Regiment of Canadian Artillery
- Garrison/HQ: Kenora, Ontario
- Mottos: Ubique (Latin for 'everywhere'); Quo fas et gloria ducunt (Latin for 'whither right and glory lead')
- March: Quick: British Grenadiers

The 116th Independent Field Battery, Royal Canadian Artillery is a Canadian Army Reserve independent artillery battery based in Kenora, Ontario, which forms part of the 3rd Canadian Division's 38 Canadian Brigade Group. The battery parades at the Kenora Armoury, 800-11th Avenue North.

== Lineage ==
=== The Kenora Light Infantry ===
In 1908, the 98th Regiment was created by separating two companies (Kenora and Fort Frances) from the 96th Regiment and organizing two new companies, with regimental headquarters in Kenora. After the regiment was renamed multiple times during the 1920s, becoming the Kenora Light Infantry, it was split into two in 1936. After the split, the 17th Medium Battery remained in service until 1946. During the 1940s to 1980, the 16th Medium Battery was renamed multiple times and merged with the 209th (Reserve) Field Battery before becoming the 116th Independent Field Battery in 1981.

=== 11th Medium Battery (Howitzer), RCA ===
In 1920, the 11th Siege Battery was created. Following multiple renames from the 1920 to 1940s, the battery was merged into the 116th Independent Field Battery when it was known as the 16th Medium Battery in 1946.

=== Listing ===
- Originated on 1 April 1908, in Kenora, Ontario, as the 98th Regiment.
- Redesignated on 12 March 1920, as The Rainy River and Kenora Regiment.
- Redesignated on 1 September 1921, as The Kenora Light Infantry.
- Converted to artillery on 15 December 1936, and reorganised as two artillery batteries: the 16th Medium Battery (Howitzer), RCA (currently the 116th Independent Field Battery, RCA) and the 17th Medium Battery (Howitzer), RCA (disbanded on 31 March 1946).

Lineage chart

1908	98th Regt
1915	94th "Overseas" Bn, CEF
1916	Absorbed by 17th Reserve Bn and 32nd "Overseas" Bn
1917	No. 11 Canadian Siege Bty, CGA, CEF (Note: 3rd Brigade, CGA, CEF)
1920	1st Bn (141st Bn, CEF), The Rainy River and Kenora Regt	2nd Bn (Note: Reserve), The Rainy River and Kenora Regt	Disbanded	11th Siege Bty, CA (Note: 5th Brigade, CFA)
1921	1st Bn (94th Bn, CEF), The Kenora Light Infy	2nd Bn, The Kenora Light Infy
1925	11th Medium Bty (Howitzer), CA
1935	11th Medium Bty (Howitzer), RCA
1936	Disbanded
1936	16th Medium Bty (Howitzer), RCA (Note: 7th Medium Brigade, RCA)	17th Medium Bty (Howitzer), RCA
1939	11th Medium Bty, RCA, CASF
8th Medium Bty, RCA, CASF
1940	16th (Reserve) Medium Bty (Howitzer), RCA (Note: 7th (Reserve) Medium Brigade, RCA)	17th (Reserve) Medium Bty (Howitzer), RCA	8th/11th Medium Bty, RCA, CASF	11th (Reserve) Medium Bty (Howitzer), RCA
1941	8th Medium Bty, RCA, CASF	11th Medium Bty, RCA, CASF
1941	11th Heavy Anti-Aircraft Bty, RCA, CASF (Note: 2nd Heavy Anti-Aircraft Regiment (Mobile), RCA, CASF)
1942	209th (Reserve) Fd Bty, RCA
1943	16th/17th Medium Bty, RCA
1945	Disbanded
1946	Disbanded
1946	116th Medium Bty, RCA (Note: 40th Medium Regiment, RCA)
1965	116th Fd Bty, RCA (Note: 40th Field Artillery Regiment, RCA)
1981	116th Independent Fd Bty, RCA

== Perpetuations ==
The 116th Independent Field Battery, RCA, perpetuates the 94th Battalion (New Ontario), CEF, and No. 11 Canadian Siege Battery, Canadian Garrison Artillery, CEF.

== Operational history ==
=== Great War ===
Versions of the 116th fought during World War I in France.

=== Second World War ===
The 17th Field Regiment, RCA was mobilized originally as two batteries, the 37th Battery and the 60/76 Battery. The 37th Battery was recruited as three troops, A troop at Fort William and Port Arthur, B troop at Fort Frances and Kenora, and C troop at Portage la Prairie. The 60/76 Battery was recruited entirely from Saskatchewan, half coming from Aneroid and other points in Western and South Western Saskatchewan while the second half came from Indian Head and the CPR main line district East of Regina.

The Non-Permanent Active Militia units from which these two active service batteries were formed, were the 7th Medium Artillery Brigade which consisted of the 16th Battery centred at Kenora, the 17th Battery at Fort Frances and the 18th Battery at Port Arthur, the 26 Field Artillery Brigade from Brandon, the 10th and 22nd Field Artillery Brigades of South Saskatchewan. These units provided the NCO and officer nucleus which was responsible for the initial training and the transformation from a civilian to a soldier.

The 17th Regiment, RCA was a three-battery, 24 gun regiment. Each of the three batteries of the regiment contained two troops. The 37th Battery made up Charlie and Dog Troops.

== Battle honours ==
In 1930 the Kenora Light Infantry was awarded the following battle honours for the Great War. These honours became dormant in 1936 upon conversion to artillery; they were subsumed under the RCA's honorary distinction ubique 'everywhere'.

- Somme, 1916 (Note: Selected to be borne on colours and appointments)
- Arras, 1917, 18 (Note: "Arras, 1917" selected to be borne on colours and appointments)
- Hill 70
- Ypres, 1917
- Amiens
- Hindenburg Line
- Pursuit to Mons

== Equipment ==
- Commercial Utility Cargo Vehicle - logistics and transport
- Iltis - transport

A Universal Carrier and M114 155 mm howitzer are found along the side and main entrance to the Armoury.
