= 229th (South Saskatchewan) Battalion, CEF =

Unit in the Canadian Expeditionary Force during the World War I

The 229th Battalion, CEF was a unit in the Canadian Expeditionary Force during the First World War. Based in Moose Jaw, Saskatchewan, the unit began recruiting in early 1916 in southern Saskatchewan. After sailing to England in April 1917, the battalion was absorbed into the 19th Reserve Battalion on May 10, 1917. The 229th Battalion, CEF had one Officer Commanding: Lieut-Col. H. D. Pickett.
