= 243rd Battalion, CEF =

The 243rd Battalion, CEF was a unit in the Canadian Expeditionary Force during the First World War. Based in Prince Albert, Saskatchewan, the unit began recruiting in the spring of 1916 in Saskatoon, Prince Albert, Yorkton, and North Battleford. After sailing to England in June 1917, the battalion was absorbed into the 15th Reserve Battalion, CEF upon arrival. The 243rd Battalion, CEF had one Officer Commanding: Major G. G. Smith.
