= 108th Battalion (Selkirk), CEF =

Canadian Expeditionary Force battalion

The 108th Battalion (Selkirk), CEF, was an infantry battalion of the Great War Canadian Expeditionary Force. The 108th Battalion was authorized on 4 November 1915 and embarked for Britain on 19 September 1916, where its personnel were absorbed by the 14th Reserve Battalion, CEF, to provide reinforcements for the Canadian Corps in the field. The battalion disbanded on 4 August 1917.

The 108th Battalion recruited throughout Manitoba and was mobilized at Selkirk.

The 108th Battalion was commanded by Lt.-Col. G.H. Bradbury from 18 September 1916 to 15 December 1916.

The 108th Battalion was awarded the battle honour THE GREAT WAR 1916–17.

The 108th Battalion (Selkirk), CEF, is not perpetuated by the Canadian Army.

== Sources ==
- Canadian Expeditionary Force 1914–1919 by Col. G. W. L. Nicholson, CD, Queen's Printer, Ottawa, Ontario, 1962
