= 225th =

225th may refer to:

== Military units ==
- 225th (Kootenay) Battalion, CEF, a unit in the Canadian Expeditionary Force during the First World War
- 225th Brigade Support Battalion, a United States Army unit based at Schofield Barracks, Hawaii
- 225th Combat Communications Squadron (225 CBCS) is an Air National Guard combat communications unit located at Gadsden, Alabama
- 225th Engineer Brigade (United States), a combat heavy engineer brigade of the Louisiana Army National Guard
- 225th Brigade (United Kingdom), a British Army infantry formation during World War II
- 225th (Parachute) Field Ambulance, a Royal Army Medical Corps unit of the British airborne forces during the Second World War

== Other uses ==
- 225th Street station, a local station on the IRT White Plains Road Line of the New York City Subway
- Marble Hill–225th Street station, a local station on the IRT Broadway – Seventh Avenue Line of the New York City Subway

== See also ==
- 225 (number)
- 225, the year 225 (CCXXV) of the Julian calendar
