= 225th (Kootenay) Battalion, CEF =

The 225th Battalion, CEF was a unit in the Canadian Expeditionary Force during the First World War. Based in Fernie, British Columbia, the unit began recruiting in early 1916 in Fernie, Cranbrook, Nelson, and Grand Forks. After sailing to England in January 1917, the battalion was absorbed into the 16th Reserve Battalion on February 6, 1917. The 225th Battalion, CEF had one officer commanding: Lieut-Col. J. MacKay.
