= Bermudians in the Canadian Expeditionary Force =

Many British nationals from the United Kingdom or colonies who were resident in Canada during the First World War joined the Canadian Expeditionary Force, which was deployed to the Western Front. A sizeable percentage of Bermuda's volunteers who served in the war joined the CEF or the Royal Canadian Navy (RCN), either because they were resident in Canada already, or because Canada was the nearest and easiest other part of the British Empire and Commonwealth to reach from Bermuda (1,239 kilometres (770 miles) from Nova Scotia). As the Royal Canadian Regiment, 38th Battalion (Ottawa), CEF, 77th Battalion, CEF, and 163rd Battalion (French-Canadian), CEF, were successively posted to the Bermuda Garrison before proceeding to France, islanders were also able to enlist there. Although the Bermuda Militia Artillery (BMA) and Bermuda Volunteer Rifle Corps (BVRC) both sent contingents to the Western Front, the first would not arrive there until June 1915. By then, many Bermudians had already been serving on the Western Front in the CEF for months. No further contingents were sent to France by the BVRC after 1916, however forty-seven BVRC NCOs and Riflemen (Privates) were permitted to re-enlist in Canada during the course of the war. Although some enlisted in British Army organs in Canada, including the Royal Flying Corps, most joined the Canadian Expeditionary Force. Bermudians in the CEF enlisted under the same terms as Canadians.

Bermudians had long played important roles in the government and development of the continental colonies of British North America and the Dominion of Canada. Bermudian merchant John Dunscombe (1777 – November 1847) was a member of the Executive Council for Newfoundland from 1833 to 1842. John Hamilton Gray (1814-1889) was a politician in the Province of New Brunswick, a jurist, and one of the Fathers of the Confederation of Canada. He was also a Lieutenant-Colonel, and the Commanding Officer of the Queen's Rangers of New Brunswick. Bermudians consequently contributed to the Canadian war effort in other ways than serving abroad themselves, including by sending their Canadian and Newfoundland-born children into the ranks of the CEF. Although a civilian, Bermudian-born Sir Joseph Outerbridge was the commanding officer of the Church Lads' Brigade from 1890 to 1894, and during the First World War was the vice president of the Patriotic Association of Newfoundland (which was not then a part of Canada), which raised and maintained the Newfoundland Regiment (organised as part of the British Army, rather than the Canadian Militia). The regiment had been formed following a meeting at the Colonial Office on 10 August 1914, where representatives of the Church Lads Brigade, the Methodist Guards, the Catholic Cadet Corps, the Newfoundland Highlanders, the Legion of Frontiersmen and St. John's Rifle Club agreed to form a unit of 500 all ranks, administered by a Reserve Force Committee chaired by Sir Joseph Outerbridge. Enlistment began at the Church Lads' Brigade Armoury on 21 August 1914. Outerbridge's sons included United States-born Lieutenant-Colonel Sir Leonard Cecil Outerbridge, MBE, DSO, who had been commissioned into the 10th Regiment, Royal Grenadiers, in 1912, and joined the CEF in 1915. He served with the 35th and 75th Battalions, and on the staffs of the first Canadian Infantry Brigade and the Fourth Canadian Division. He was twice mentioned-in-despatches and was awarded the Distinguished Service Order. He became the Honorary Colonel of the Newfoundland Regiment in 1949, and was the Lieutenant-Governor of Newfoundland from 1949 to 1957. Lieutenant Norman Aubrey Outerbridge of the 1st Battalion, The Newfoundland Regiment, was killed at Monchy-le-Preux on 14 April 1917. Another son, Captain Herbert A. Outerbridge, MBE, also served on the Western Front in the 1st Battalion, Newfoundland Regiment.

The following list, which is undoubtedly incomplete, only includes those who joined Canadian military units during the war, not those who served in the RCN, or those who joined British Army units, such as the Royal Flying Corps, in Canada without passing through nominally Canadian military units first.

NAME	RANK	UNIT	COMMENT
Adams, Karl Leslie	Private	38th Battalion (Ottawa), CEF*	Enlisted. The battalion was sent from Montreal to Bermuda to replace the Royal Canadian Regiment, which had itself replaced the 2nd Battalion of the Lincolnshire Regiment of the British Army, on garrison duty, arriving on 12 August 1915 with 35 officers and 959 other ranks. It departed Bermuda on 30 May 1916, arriving in England on 9 June 1916, with 35 officers and 1001 other ranks. *Canadian Great War Project records Adams as having enlisted in the 163rd Battalion (French-Canadian), CEF on 30 June 1916, at Prospect Camp, Bermuda.
Anderson, Charles Adolphus	Private	163rd Battalion (French Canadian), CEF; 10th Reserve Battalion, CEF	Born 13 December 1895. A 17 years old journeyman tailor when he married Maud Louise Durham on 1 June 1913 at Pembroke, Bermuda. Shown as a tailor when he enlisted at Prospect Camp, Bermuda, on 19 July 1916.
Astwood, Harold Frith	Private	1st Field Ambulance, Royal Canadian Army Medical Corps.	Regimental number 523807. Enlisted on 3 April 1916, at Winnipeg, Manitoba. Brother of James Clifton Astwood and Merven Stuart Astwood.
Astwood, James Clifton	Private	1st Depot Battalion, Manitoba Regiment.	Enlisted on 27 November 1917, at Winnipeg, Manitoba. Brother of Harold Frith Astwood and Merven Stuart Astwood.
Astwood, Merven Stuart	Private	1st Depot Battalion, Manitoba Regiment	Enlisted 3 January 1918, at Port Arthur, Ontario. Brother of Harold Frith Astwood and James Clifton Astwood.
Barritt, Frank Leslie	Corporal	The Fort Garry Horse, CEF	Regimental number 111024. Enlisted in 1914. Wounded in the hip and taken Prisoner-of-War, 21 January 1917. Returned to England on 4 December 1919. Returned to Bermuda (with four other soldiers) on 8 April 1919, aboard the SS Chaleur from Halifax, NS. Canadian Great War Project lists as having served in the Bermuda Volunteer Rifle Corps before enlisting as a Trooper in 6th Regiment, Canadian Mounted Rifles, and his final unit as the 2nd Field Company, Canadian Engineers. Wounded in action on 10 May 1916.
Basham, Frederick Charles Tucker		28th Field Company, Royal Canadian Engineers, CEF	Regimental Number: 2006618. Commissioned. Awarded Military Cross
Brown, Ewart Cudemore	Lieutenant	McGill University Overseas Contingent	Enlisted together with Edward Tucker (below), August 1914. Both had worked for Bank of Montreal at St. John's, N.B. Appointed Lance-Corporal by April 1915.
Brown, Frank	Private	42nd Battalion (Royal Highlanders of Canada), CEF	Regimental Number: 489379. Enlisted on 5 January 1916, in Halifax, NS. Died in Belgium on 3 August 1916.
Burgess, Alfred Hamilton	Private	198th Battalion (Canadian Buffs), CEF	Regimental Number: 916814
Burrows, Stuart Alexander	Sergeant	Composite Battalion, CEF.	Regimental Number: 733535. Enlisted in Halifax, NS, in 1915. Promoted to Sergeant in 112th Battalion. Posted to Bramshott Camp in England as an instructor. Gave up his rank in 1917 to transfer to the Royal Canadian Regiment in France. Severely wounded near Lens. Hospitalised for several months before declared unfit for active service and returned to Canada. Returned to Bermuda (with four other soldiers) aboard the SS Chaleur from Halifax, NS, on 8 April 1919. Rank noted in the Royal Gazette of 10 April 1919, as Sergeant.
Burrows, John Francis	Private	69th Battery, Canadian Field Artillery; 1st Battalion Canadian Machine Gun Corps	Regimental Number: 340204. Served previously in the Bermuda Volunteer Rifle Corps. As no further contingents were planned to be sent abroad by the BVRC or BMA, travelled to Canada to enlist with W.E. Cooper, E.W. Doe, B.A. ??, H.E. Kemp, and S.S. Toddings. Provided a letter of introduction by Governor and Commander-in-Chief of Bermuda, Major-General Sir George Mackworth Bullock, they enlisted into the 69th Battery at Toronto on 31 March 1917. Killed 1918. Canadian Great War Project shows that subsequently to the CFA, he served in 1st Battalion, Canadian Machine Gun Corps.
Butterfield, Charles Nathaniel Arthur		University of Toronto Overseas Contingent	Regimental Number: 2365936 Enlisted on 24 August 1918, in Toronto, Ontario. Attached 1st Tank Battalion. Had previously served for eleven months as a private in the T.M.C., and for seven months as a Rifleman in the Bermuda Volunteer Rifle Corps.
Butterfield, Harry Durham	Corporal; Lieutenant	Canadian Garrison Artillery (McGill Contingent)	Regimental Number: 1261662. Commissioned September 1918, into 2nd Canadian Division Signals Company, Royal Canadian Engineers. Meritorious Service Medal. Officer Commanding the Bermuda Volunteer Engineers, 1931–1932. Knighted.
Castle, George John Samuel	Private	38th Battalion (Ottawa), CEF	Enlisted on 8 December 1915. He had previously served for nine years in the Bermuda Volunteer Rifle Corps.
Conyers, Charles	Sergeant	62nd Battery, Canadian Field Artillery	Regimental Number: 1260409. Enlisted in Victoria, British Columbia, on 18 April 1916. Had previously served in 5th (British Columbia) Regiment, Canadian Garrison Artillery.
Cooper, Clarence John	Captain	Canadian Army Permanent Veterinary Corps	Veterinary surgeon. Former Sergeant in the Bermuda Volunteer Rifle Corps (3 years). At the time of volunteering for the CEF on 1 February 1917, he was a Lieutenant in the 31st Grey Regiment at Meaford, Ontario (2 years). Promoted Captain, 23 September 1918
Cooper, Wilfred Eugene	Gunner	69th Battery, Canadian Field Artillery	See comment for John Burrows (above). Service #340206. Served as an officer in the BVRC into the Second World War with the rank of Captain (acting Major).
Crisson, John Ethelbert	Gunner	69th Battery, Canadian Field Artillery	Previously served in the Bermuda Volunteer Rifle Corps. Left Halifax on SS Megantic, 24 November 1917. Arrived in Liverpool, 6 December 1917. Motorcycle despatch rider in France. Returned to Canada 16 March 1919. Discharged on 31 March 1919. Founded Crissons jewelry firm in Bermuda in 1921 with his brother, Herbert S. Crisson.
Curtis, Harry Croyle	Officer Cadet	University of Toronto Officers Training Corps	Regimental number 2365392. Transferred to Royal Navy. Commissioned.
Denham, Frederick William Clarke	Gunner	69th Battery, Canadian Field Artillery	Transferred to Trench Mortar Battery.
Dickins, Eldon Charles	Gunner	69th Battery, Canadian Field Artillery	
Dickinson, Percival Erle	Private	Canadian Army Medical Corps	2606959. Previously served five years in the BVRC. Pre-war occupation was as a drug clerk. Died in Halifax, NS, October 1918, a few weeks after enlisting. Detailed to nurse 1918 influenza patients, he caught, and died of, the disease himself.
Doe, Evelyn Walton	Corporal	119th (Algoma) Battalion, CEF, Royal Canadian Horse Artillery	See comment for John Burrows. Previously served six months in the BVRC with the rank of Rifleman. Served as a Gunner in the 69th Battery, Canadian Field Artillery. Awarded Belgian Croix de Guerre.
Doe, Joseph Eldon	Private	Canadian Cycle Corps.	Canadian Corps Cyclists Company
Doers, Ivan Wesleyan McCall Benjamin	Private	163rd Battalion (French-Canadian), CEF.	Enlisted on 18 July 1916, at Prospect Camp, Bermuda. Next-of-kin was mother Mrs. Arthur Doers, of Mount Hill, Hamilton, Bermuda. Prior military experience.
Down, Albert Edward	Private; Lieutenant	28th Battalion (Northwest), CEF, North-West Canadian Regiment	Previously served 7 1/2 years in BVRC. Awarded Military Medal, November 1916. Promoted to Sergeant 1 December 1917. Specially mentioned 1 February 1918. Gazetted Second-Lieutenant, July 1918.
Down, George	Private	67th Battalion	Previously served in the 88th Regiment, Victoria Fusiliers.
Dunscombe, Howard Stanley	Gunner	9 Overseas Siege Battery, CEF Canadian Garrison Artillery	
Dunstan, Norman	Private	2nd Battalion, Cyclist Corps, CEF	Previously served 9 years in Canadian Garrison Artillery
Fraser, Lavinia Flora	Nursing Sister	Canadian Army Medical Corps	Previously served three years in AMC, Canadian Militia. TOS Halifax, NS, 16 September 1918.
Fraser, Lewis Hayes	Captain	Canadian Army Medical Corps	Had a practice in Peru before joining the CEF. Previously served 9 years in the Canadian Militia. Received the Military Cross in 1918 for going back under fire to rescue the wounded Major Alexander McPherson, who commanded the unit to which he was attached.
Frith, Frederick Harvey	Private	31st Battalion	Later served in 137th Battalion. Died 17 September 1916. Son of Frederick Harvey Frith and Catherine Adams Frith. Next-of-kin: mother Mrs. Catherine Adams Frith, 736 - 1 Avenue N.W., Calgary, Alberta.
Galway, Mark Vossmer	Private	7th Battalion	Previous service: Bermuda Volunteer Rifle Corps (three years). Enlisted 24 April 1916, in Vancouver, British Columbia. Served in 121st Battalion, 7th Battalion, and 1st Reserve Battalion. Wounded in action.
Gee, Arthur Edward	Private	"C" Company, Royal Canadian Regiment; 17th Canadian Reserve	Regimental number 411417 (old number 12287). Next-of-kin: Mrs A. Rose Gee (wife), "Homestead", Victoria Street, City of Hamilton, Pembroke, Bermuda. Joined 2 August 1914. Went to Bermuda with RCR. Proceeded to France Autumn, 1915. Wounded in 1916 (buried by a shell, resulting in shell shock). Medically discharged 10 February 1919.
Gorham, Clive William	Sergeant	Composite Battalion AM; 82nd Battalion, CEF	Regimental number 685. From Pembroke, Bermuda. Born 18 November 1888 to Richard Gorham and Georgiana Louisa Gorham (born Kirkham). Enlisted at Halifax, Nova Scotia, summer 1915. Posted to Wellington Barracks, Halifax. Promoted to Corporal, then Sergeant. Died 1 December 1915, attempting to rescue Private Truen, killed by electrocution when stepping on a power line downed in the snow on the corner of Church Street and Morris Street, in Halifax. Gorham was also electrocuted. His body was forwarded to Bermuda for burial.
Gray, Edmund Brownlow	Gunner	Reserve Brigade, Canadian Field Artillery	Enlisted 1 August 1916, at Shorncliffe Camp, Kent, England. Service number 1260258. Previously served for 5 years in the Bermuda Cadet Corps, and for 20 months in the Officer Training Corps, England. Wounded, 4 October 1918.
Gunn, Archibald Donald	Private	112th Battalion (Nova Scotia), CEF	Enlisted 19 January 1916, in Halifax, NS. 112th Battalion (Nova Scotia), CEF, proceeded to Britain on 23 July 1916, but not to the Western Front. It instead provided replacements to other battalions in France until absorbed by the 26th Reserve Battalion, CEF, on 7 January 1917. Canadian Great War Project lists Gunn serving in the 112th and the 25th Battalion (Nova Scotia Rifles), CEF. Killed in action 29 April 1917.
Harvey, Eldon	Officer Cadet	OTC, Toronto	Completed O.T.C., Toronto, Canada, and resigned on 8 July 1918. Discharged from CEF. Training for commission in Royal Garrison Artillery in UK, September 1918.
Harvey, Raymond	Officer Cadet	OTC, Toronto	Details same as for brother, above.
Higinbothom, Henry Charles	Private	1st Depot Battalion; 1st Central Ontario Regiment	Previously a Second-Lieutenant in the Bermuda Militia Artillery. Employed in Toronto by Bank of Montreal. Offered commission into CEF in 1915. Conscripted 1 January 1918. Wounded September 1918.
Huestis, Harold Waldo	Private	46th Battalion	Born 5 January 1896, at St. George's, Bermuda.
Jackson, Cyril Healy	3rd Battalion, CEF	Canadian Expeditionary Force	An accountant at the Bank of Toronto at the time of enlistment (on 22 September 1914). Enlisted August 1914. Wounded and discharged as medically unfit, having been previously reported missing, then presumed to have died on or since 2 May 1915, then a prisoner in Germany, and finally having gone to Bermuda 4 November 1916. Pension granted 3 August 1916.
Jackson, Lionel Arnot	Private	187th (Central Alberta) Battalion, CEF	An engineer when he attested on 31 May 1916. Wounded and discharged as medically unfit.
Johnston, Harold Clifford	Private	163rd Battalion (French-Canadian), CEF; 87th Battalion, CEF; 23rd Reserve Battalion	Regimental Number: 661148. Invalided, wounded and posted to Quebec Regimental Depot Bramshott 26 August 1918. Demobilised at Montreal, 16 May 1919.
Kemp, Howard Evelyn	Gunner	69th Battery, Canadian Field Artillery	See comment for John Burrows (above). Previously served six years in the BVRC.
Lamb, Albert Alfred Ernest	Private	38th Battalion, CEF	410965. Died 29 October 1916. Place of birth: St. David's Island, St. George's Parish, Bermuda (baptised 21 April 1881). Son of Mr Joseph William Lamb and Mrs. Jane Elizabeth Lamb (born Fox). Husband of Isabella Sarah McKinney Lamb (born O'Connor), of St. David's Island, Bermuda. Father of Sarah and Winifred Magdalene Ideana Lamb.
Lomax, Otterwell Thomas	Sergeant	34th Battery, Canadian Field Artillery (1st Reinforcing Draft), 9th Brigade	Regimental number 300618. Enlisted as a Gunner on 16 August 1915. Promoted to Sergeant 1 September 1915. Previously served four years in the Bermuda Volunteer Rifle Corps. Civil employment before the war was with the Royal Gazette newspaper, City of Hamilton, Pembroke Parish, Bermuda. Born in London, England. Next-of-kin: William Lomax (father), 12 Bridport Street, Lisson Grove, London. Subsequently, served with: 3rd Battery, at Shorncliffe, Kent, England (28 October 1915); the Canadian School of Gunnery at Shorncliffe (21 January 1917), appointed acting Sergeant Major whilst employed as acting Musketry Instructor at the same school (9 March 1917); reverting to Sergeant on ceasing to be so employed (3 May 1917); the 5th Rse. Battery at Shorncliffe; reverted to the rank of Gunner in order to proceed to the Western Front (6 June 1917); attached to 1st DAC on arrival from England (13 June 1917); ceased to be attached and transferred to 2nd Brigade (23 July 1917); 9th Brigade, CFA (1 August 1917); appointed acting Bombardier (22 December 1917); promoted to Bombardier (24 August 1918); proceeded to England (12 February 1919); 9th Brigade on proceeding to Canada (18 March 1919); awarded Belgian Croix de Guerre (19 June 1919). Discharged at Toronto (30 March 1919), evidently from 33rd Battery, CFA.
Morris, Leonard Lionel	Private	38th Battalion, CEF	Regimental number 410545. Taken on strength in Bermuda, 1 September 1915. Place of birth: Jamaica. Next-of-kin was wife, Mrs Ada Morris, Pembroke, Bermuda.
Morris, Raymond Frederick	Private	38th Battalion, CEF; Canadian Army Service Corps	Regimental number 410546. Taken on strength in Bermuda, 1 September 1915. Occupation was a shoemaker. Place of birth: Jamaica. Next-of-kin was mother, Mrs Rachel Morris, Pembroke, Bermuda. Attested into Canadian Army Service Corps at Ottawa on 2 June 1919, after three years and nine months service in the 38th Battalion, CEF.
Morton, Cyril	Private	38th Battalion, CEF	The younger son of Mrs. Louise B. Morton, of Newlands, Devonshire, Bermuda. Employed by Norman Young's hardware store prior to enlistment. Enlisted in Bermuda (service number 410977). First posted to the signal Section, then the Machine gun Section. Killed in action 27 October 1916.
Moss, John Wingfield		10th Siege Battery, Canadian Garrison Artillery	Previously served two years in the Bermuda Cadet Corps. Born in St. George's, Bermuda. Son of Mrs. E. M. Moss of "Mount Erie", St. George's. Enlisted in Halifax, Nova Scotia, in 1917. Not listed on Canadian Great war Project, but attestation form exists and shows he enlisted into the 10th Siege Battery. The Royal Gazette reported (on 10 April 1919) that he had returned to Bermuda on 8 April, along with four other soldiers, aboard the SS Chaleur from Halifax, NS. It reported that he had enlisted in, and spent his service in, the 38th Battery, Canadian Field Artillery, serving on the Western Front from 1917 to the Armistice.
Motyer, Arthur John	Lieutenant	Canadian Field Artillery	1905 Bermuda Rhodes Scholar. Pre-war occupation was as an electrical engineer. Previous service two years in the King's Colonials in England, and one year in the 2nd Dragoons in Canada. Enlisted 26 September 1914. Killed in action 15 September 1916.
Motyer, William Ernest Phillips	Sergeant	Canadian Engineers	Regimental number 2006322. Enlisted into CEF in Toronto on 9 July 1917. Previously served two years, five months in the Canadian Army Service Corps; Sergeant. Next of kin: Emphraim Motyer, Hamilton, Bermuda (father). Brother of Arthur John Motyer. DOB: 26 October 1892.
Palmer, Richard Ernest	Lance-Corporal	163rd Battalion (French-Canadian), CEF	Enlisted in Bermuda. Previously a Postman in Paget Parish East, Bermuda. Brother served in 1915 Bermuda Volunteer Rifle Corps contingent to Lincolnshire Regiment. Badly wounded in 1917, resulting in amputation of a leg.
Perinchief, Harold Edgar	Private	Canadian Army Medical Corps	From Somerset, Bermuda. Brother of Leon (below). Both went from Niagara on the Lake, Canada (going to Toronto to embark, where the band of the 75th Battalion, CEF, had marched them to the pier) to England together, arriving at Plymouth on 20 September, and were at the CAMC Training School in England the following day, and assisted with bearing casualties evacuated from France to hospital from the train station to the hospital.
Perinchief, Lionel Norton "Leon"	Private	Canadian Army Medical Corps	From Somerset, Bermuda. Brother of Harold (see comment above).
Ratteray, William Alfred Richard	Private	163rd Battalion, CEF; 10th Reserve Battalion, CEF	Regimental Number: 661130. Enlisted at Prospect Camp, Bermuda
Robinson, Charles Bryan	Captain (Adjutant)	1st Canadian Contingent, Salvation Army Battalion	From Spanish Point, in Pembroke Parish, Bermuda. Appointed in April 1915, as a chaplain from the Salvation Army to 20th Battalion (Central Ontario), CEF. Resigned as chaplain on 16 November 1916. Enlisted into CEF. Musketry instructor in Canada. Commissioned. Proceeded to France with the 7th Battalion (1st British Columbia), CEF. Lieutenant, 17 February 1918. Awarded Military Cross, for gallantry at Flanders. Killed in action, 2 September 1918.
Robinson, Wilfred Ryland	Private	Canadian Army Medical Corps	#528485. Enlisted at Toronto on 12 September 1917.
Simpson, George Wilmot Rae	Captain. Wounded 22 May 1915	The Black Watch (Royal Highland Regiment) of Canada, mobilised for overseas service. Canadian Expeditionary Force. Previously served three years in the Artists Rifles.	Enlisted 23 September 1914.
Smellie, William Alexander	Sergeant	38th Battalion, CEF	Regimental number 410887. Taken on strength in Bermuda, 27 August 1915. Previously served one year in the Bermuda Volunteer Rifle Corps. DOB: 6 August 1888. Born in Glasgow, Scotland. Pre-war occupation: tailor (see also "Vallis, Alfred Howard", below). Next-of-kin: Mrs. WA Smellie, Hamilton, Bermuda.
Smith, Eugene Brownlow		64th Battalion, CEF	
Smith, Charles Kennelly	Staff-Sergeant	78th Battalion, CEF; 1st Artillery Brigade Headquarters	Enlisted at Valcartier, Québec, on 23 September 1914. Born 16 October 1889, in Bermuda. Son of Fred and Emma Smith of Ireland Island, Bermuda. Canadian Great War Project records him serving in the Canadian Ordnance Corps. The first Bermudian to be awarded the Military Medal for gallantry under fire. The Edinburgh Gazette, in publishing this award, listed him as: 40080 Staff Sjt, Armt. Artif'r C. K. Smith, 1st Bde., Field Arty. Killed in action in France on 22 August 1917. Buried at Etaples Military Cemetery, France.
Smith, Wilfred Seymour	Private	Queen's Own Rifles of Canada; Machine Gun Company, 3rd Overseas Battalion	Enlisted 22 September 1914. Went to France as a Machine Gunner in 3rd Canadian Battalion (Toronto Regiment), CEF. Discharged in UK and commissioned into British Army, December 1914.
Stewart, Harry	Private	38th Battalion, CEF	Regimental number 410408. Attested at St. George's, Bermuda, 26 October 1915. Next-of-kin: Mr Thomas T Stewart, 38 St. David Street, Toronto, Ontario, Canada.
Sweeney, John Francis	Sergeant	38th Battalion, CEF	Regimental number 410637. Taken on strength at Bermuda, 27 August 1915. Previously served in the Imperial forces. Place-of-birth: England. Married Ethel Adora Goddard on 17 February 1898, in Pembroke Parish.
Taggart, George Henry Josiah	Private	38th Battalion, CEF	Previously served in Royal Garrison Artillery, discharged as a Sergeant (number 70594), and Bermuda Police Service as a warder at City of Hamilton Gaol, Bermuda. Taken on strength of 38th Battalion, CEF, in Bermuda, 1915. With Remount Establishment in England in November, 1916. Medically discharged in England and returned to Bermuda.
Toddings, Samuel Steward		Regimental number 340203. 69th Battery, Canadian Field Artillery. Enlisted 2 April 1917 at Toronto. Previously served thirty-two months in the Bermuda Volunteer Rifle Corps. Newspaper editor.	See comment for John Burrows (above). Training for commission in Sussex, England, September 1918.
Tucker, Alexander Ewing	Private	2nd Universities Company, Princess Patricia's Canadian Light Infantry.	Previously served in the Bermuda Volunteer Rifle Corps and the McGill University Officer Training Corps. McG 91. Enlisted 20 May 1915. Killed in action at Sanctuary Wood, serving in Eastern Ontario Regiment, 2 June 1916.
Tucker, Edmund Richard Harvey	Sergeant; Lieutenant	1st Heavy Battery, Canadian Field Artillery	Served for five years previously in the Bermuda Volunteer Rifle Corps, and for three years in the Canadian Garrison Artillery. Enlisted on 24 September 1914, in Valcartier, Quebec. Left Canada aboard SS Megantic on 30 September 1914. Arrived in Devonport in October. Proceeded to Salisbury Plain, then to France 1914. Promoted to Sergeant before January 1916.
Tucker, Edward		Canadian Expeditionary Force	Enlisted together with Ewart Ewart Cudemore Brown (above), August 1914. Both had worked for Bank of Montreal at St. John's, N.B.
Tucker, George Samuel	Sergeant	3rd Battalion (Toronto Regiment), CEF	63869. Died 13 June 1916. Born in Hamilton Parish, Bermuda, in 1893. Son of the late Archdeacon George Tucker, and of Mrs. Anna Emeline Tucker (born Outerbridge), of Palmetto Grove, Bermuda.
Vallis, Alfred Howard	Private	2nd Queens Own Rifles; 116th Battalion, CEF	Previous service for eleven months as a Lieutenant in the Bermuda Cadet Corps. Bombardier. No. 138. Commissioned as a temporary Lieutenant, effective 20 December 1918. From Prospect, in Devonshire Parish, Bermuda. Born 11 May 1892. Killed in action, 27 August 1918.
Vallis, Cyril Cairns	Signaller	7th Siege Battery, Canadian Garrison Artillery (No.6 (McGill) Overseas Siege Battery), 69th Battery	Previous service for two years as a private in the Bermuda Volunteer Rifle Corps. Born 13 November 1899, in Pembroke, Bermuda.
Virtue, Roy Appleby	Lieutenant	Canadian Artillery 2nd Ammunition Column, Canadian Expeditionary Force	Enlisted 20 November 1914 at St. John, New Brunswick. Previously served in the Canadian Garrison Artillery.
Wainwright, James Morris	Corporal	11th Battalion, Canadian Garrison Regiment	Previously served in 107th Regiment for two years and seven months. Born 31 January 1875. Accountant. NOK: Mrs Annie Wainwright (mother), Waterloo House, Pitt's Bay Road, Pembroke Parish, Bermuda.
Wainwright, John Darrell	Gunner	69th Battery, Canadian Field Artillery	Previously served for two-and-a-half years in the BVRC, appointed Lance-Corporal, then for eight months as a private in the 57th Regiment, Peterborough Rangers (Canadian Militia).
Walker, Herman Walter		6th Regiment, Duke of Connaught's Own Rifles; 29th (Vancouver) Battalion, CEF	Commissioned Second-Lieutenant and transferred to Royal Welch Fusiliers, September 1915. Promoted to captain. On his return (with four other soldiers) to Bermuda aboard the SS Chaleur from Halifax, NS, on 8 April 1919, the Royal Gazette reported (on 10 April) that he had originally attested into the 29th Battalion, (Vancouver), CEF.
Wallace, Charles Ryan	Private	30th Battalion CEF; 47th Battalion CEF	Previously served seven months in the 2nd CMR and 4th CMR, and Seaforth Highlanders.
Ward, Stephen Remson	Private	29th Battalion, CEF	Previously served four and a half years in the Bermuda Cadet Corps.
Whittaker, Joseph Aloysius	Private	38th Battalion, CEF	Regimental number 410435. Attested in Vancouver on 26 April 1915. Taken-on-strength in Bermuda, 13 December 1915. Place-of-birth: England. Next-of-kin: Mrs JH Runbaken, Leas Farm Cottage, Mellor, near Derby, England.
Wilkinson, Edgar Campbell		69th Battery, Canadian Field Artillery	Enlisted 3 May 1917, in Ontario.
Wingood, Allan Charles	Captain	34th Fort Garry Horse; 8th Battalion (90th Winnipeg Rifles), CEF	Previous service Lieutenant 100th Regiment Winnipeg Grenadiers 1910–1913. Attested 25 September 1914. Killed in action 16 September 1916.
Winter, William Vyvyan Ross	Captain	Canadian Permanent Army Service Corps	Seconded in 1917 to the Nova Scotia Battalion of the Canadian Forestry Corps for service on the Western Front with the CEF, 1914–1918. Royal Canadian Army Service Corps D.S. and T.O., Military District No. 7, St. John, New Brunswick, 1918–1924. Retired as a captain, 23 June 1924.
Wooler, George Richard Davidson	Lieutenant	67th Battalion, CEF; 5th Battalion, CEF; 188th Battalion, CEF	Known as Dick Wooler. Previous service: Bermuda Cadet Corps, Bermuda Military Artillery (Second-Lieutenant); 6th Regiment, Duke of Connaught's Own Rifles (Lieutenant). Law student commissioned into Canadian Expeditionary Force ("B" Company, 67th (Western Scots) Battalion) on 3 January 1916, at Victoria, British Columbia. Address: Pembroke, Bermuda. Next-of-kin: Uncle (the Reverend) James Davidson (Archdeacon of Bermuda), "Long House", Pembroke, Bermuda. Wooler, born in England 3 January 1892, and his sister, May Wooler, had been raised in Bermuda by their uncle, who had been appointed Residential Canon of the Church of England Cathedral of Hamilton in 1892, after the 1897 death of his father, solicitor Richard George Wooler, and the admission of his mother, May Davidson, to an asylum. He attended Saltus Grammar School, and served in the Bermuda Cadet Corps. Wooler was commissioned as a Second-Lieutenant in the Bermuda Militia Artillery on the 24 February 1909, with effect from the 8 February. He was attached to 3 Company, Royal Garrison Artillery, for instruction from 4 November 1909, to 3 December, and awarded a 'satisfactory' certificate. He resigned his commission with effect from 28 February 1910 (by authority of War Office letter 064/1026 M.S.2), in order to study law in Canada. Transferred in England from the CEF into the Royal Flying Corps. Killed in action 15 August 1917.
