= Winnipeg Grenadiers =

The Winnipeg Grenadiers
- Regimental badge
- Active: 1 April 1908 – 28 February 1965
- Country: Canada
- Branch: Canadian Militia (1908-1940); Canadian Army (1940-1965)
- Type: Line infantry
- Role: Infantry
- Size: 1 battalion
- Part of: Non-Permanent Active Militia (1871-1940); Royal Canadian Infantry Corps (1940-1965)
- Garrison/HQ: Minto Armoury, Winnipeg, Manitoba
- Motto: Adsum (Latin for 'Present')
- March: "British Grenadiers"
- Anniversaries: Battle of Hong Kong
- Engagements: First World War; Second World War
- Battle honours: See § Battle honours

The Winnipeg Grenadiers was an infantry regiment of the Canadian Army.

First formed on 1 April 1908 under General Order No. 20. Initially it was raised with headquarters at Morden, Manitoba, and companies at: A Company at Morden, B Company at Morden, C Company at Manitou, D Company at Carman, E Company at Roland, F Company at Pilot Mound, G Company at Cartwright and H Company at Boissevain. The unit did not have any active personnel enrolled at the formation.

On 1 February 1910, all companies and headquarters were moved to Winnipeg. On 2 May 1910, the designation was changed to the 100th Winnipeg Grenadiers. The first officers were gazetted to the regiment on 18 May 1910. Lieutenant-Colonel Henry Norlande Ruttan, who came from the Retired List, commanded the regiment on organization (General Order No. 57 (HQ 32-1-107)). The regiment was reorganized under General Order No. 120 (1915) on 1 October 1915 to establish four companies.

== Lineage ==
=== The Winnipeg Grenadiers ===
The Winnipeg Grenadiers originated in Morden, Manitoba on 1 April 1908, as the 100th Regiment. It was redesignated the 100th "Winnipeg Grenadiers" on 2 May 1910 and The Winnipeg Grenadiers on 12 March 1920. On 16 November 1936, it was amalgamated with the 10th Machine Gun Battalion, CMGC and redesignated The Winnipeg Grenadiers (Machine Gun). It was redesignated the 2nd (Reserve) Battalion, The Winnipeg Grenadiers (Machine Gun) on 7 November 1940, the 2nd (Reserve) Battalion, The Winnipeg Grenadiers on 15 March 1941 and The Winnipeg Grenadiers on 28 January 1946. It was reduced to nil strength and transferred to the Supplementary Order of Battle on 28 February 1965.

=== 10th Machine Gun Battalion, CMGC ===
The 10th Machine Gun Battalion, CMGC originated in Winnipeg, Manitoba on 1 June 1919, as the 10th Machine Gun Brigade, CMGC. It was redesignated the 10th Machine Gun Battalion, CMGC, on 15 September 1924. On 16 November 1936, it was amalgamated with The Winnipeg Grenadiers. The perpetuation of the 10th Machine Gun Battalion, CMGC (1919–1936) was assigned to The Winnipeg Grenadiers (Machine Gun).

=== Lineage chart ===
Lineage chart

1908	100th Regt
1910	100th "Winnipeg Grenadiers"
1914	11th Bn, CEF
1915	78th "Overseas" Bn, CEF	11th Reserve Infy Bn, CEF	100th "Overseas" Bn, CEF
1917	Disbanded	Disbanded
1919	10th MG Bde, CMGC
1920	Disbanded	1st Bn (78th Bn, CEF), The Winnipeg Grenadiers	2nd Bn (11th Bn, CEF), (Note: Reserve order of battle) The Winnipeg Grenadiers	3rd Bn (100th Bn, CEF), The Winnipeg Grenadiers
1924	10th MG Bn, CMGC
1936	Disbanded	Disbanded
1936	The Winnipeg Grenadiers (MG)
1939	The Winnipeg Grenadiers (MG), CASF
1940	1st Bn, The Winnipeg Grenadiers (MG), CASF	2nd (Reserve) Bn, The Winnipeg Grenadiers (MG)
1941	1st Bn, The Winnipeg Grenadiers, CASF	2nd (Reserve) Bn, The Winnipeg Grenadiers
1941	Destroyed
1942	1st Bn, The Winnipeg Grenadiers, CASF
1944	3rd Canadian Infy Training Bn, Type A (Winnipeg Grenadiers), CASF
1945	No. 10 Canadian Repatriation Depot, Type "T"
1946	Disbanded	The Winnipeg Grenadiers
1965	Supplementary Order of Battle

== Perpetuations ==
The Winnipeg Grenadiers perpetuate the 11th Battalion, CEF; the 78th Battalion (Winnipeg Grenadiers), CEF; and the 100th Battalion (Winnipeg Grenadiers), CEF.

== Operational history ==
=== The Great War ===
Details from the 100th Winnipeg Grenadiers were placed on active service on 6 August 1914 for local protection duties.

The 11th Battalion, CEF was authorized on 10 August 1914 and embarked for Great Britain on 30 September 1914. It was redesigned as the 11th Reserve Infantry Battalion, CEF, on 29 April 1915 to reinforce the Canadian Corps in the field. On 4 January 1917, its personnel, along with the 100th Battalion (Winnipeg Grenadiers), CEF, were absorbed by a new 11th Reserve Battalion, CEF. The battalion was disbanded on 12 October 1917.

The 78th Battalion (Winnipeg Grenadiers), CEF, was authorized on 10 July 1915 and embarked for Great Britain on 20 May 1916, disembarking in France on 13 August 1916, where it fought as part of the 12th Canadian Brigade, 4th Canadian Division in France and Flanders until the end of the war. The battalion was disbanded on 15 September 1920.

The 100th Battalion (Winnipeg Grenadiers), CEF, was authorized on 22 December 1915 and embarked for Great Britain on 18 September 1916, where it provided reinforcements to the Canadian Corps in the field until 20 January 1917, when the 11th Reserve Battalion, CEF, absorbed its personnel. The battalion was disbanded on 1 September 1917.

Ethelbert "Curley" Christian (-15 March 1954) of the 78th Battalion, Winnipeg Grenadiers was wounded at the Battle of Vimy Ridge and was the only quadruple amputee of either World War to survive.

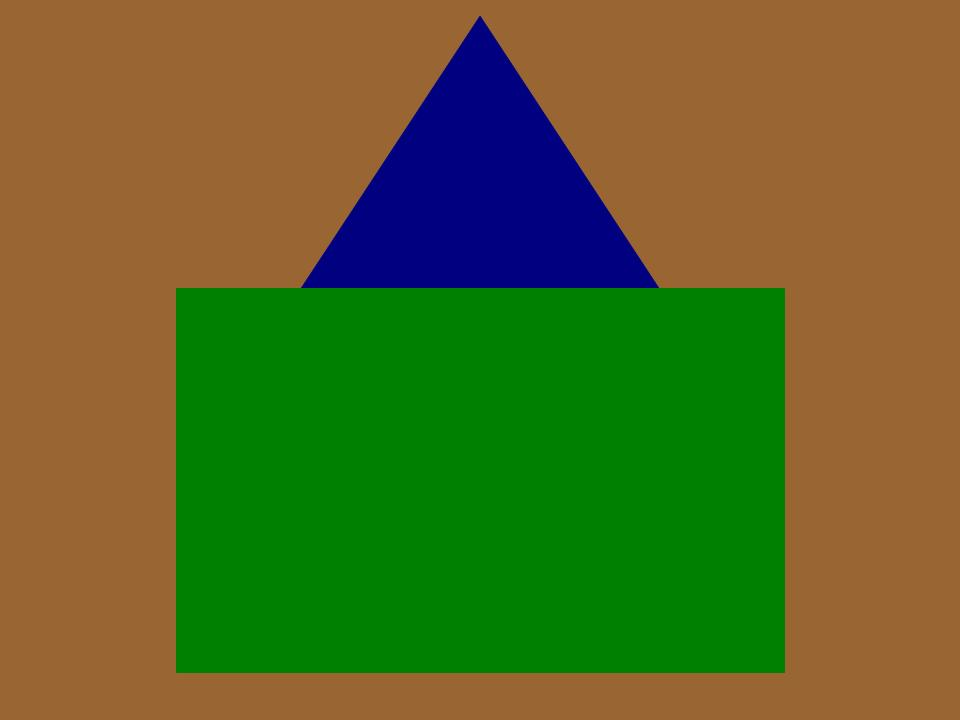
Battle Patch of the 78th Battalion (Winnipeg Grenadiers), CEF

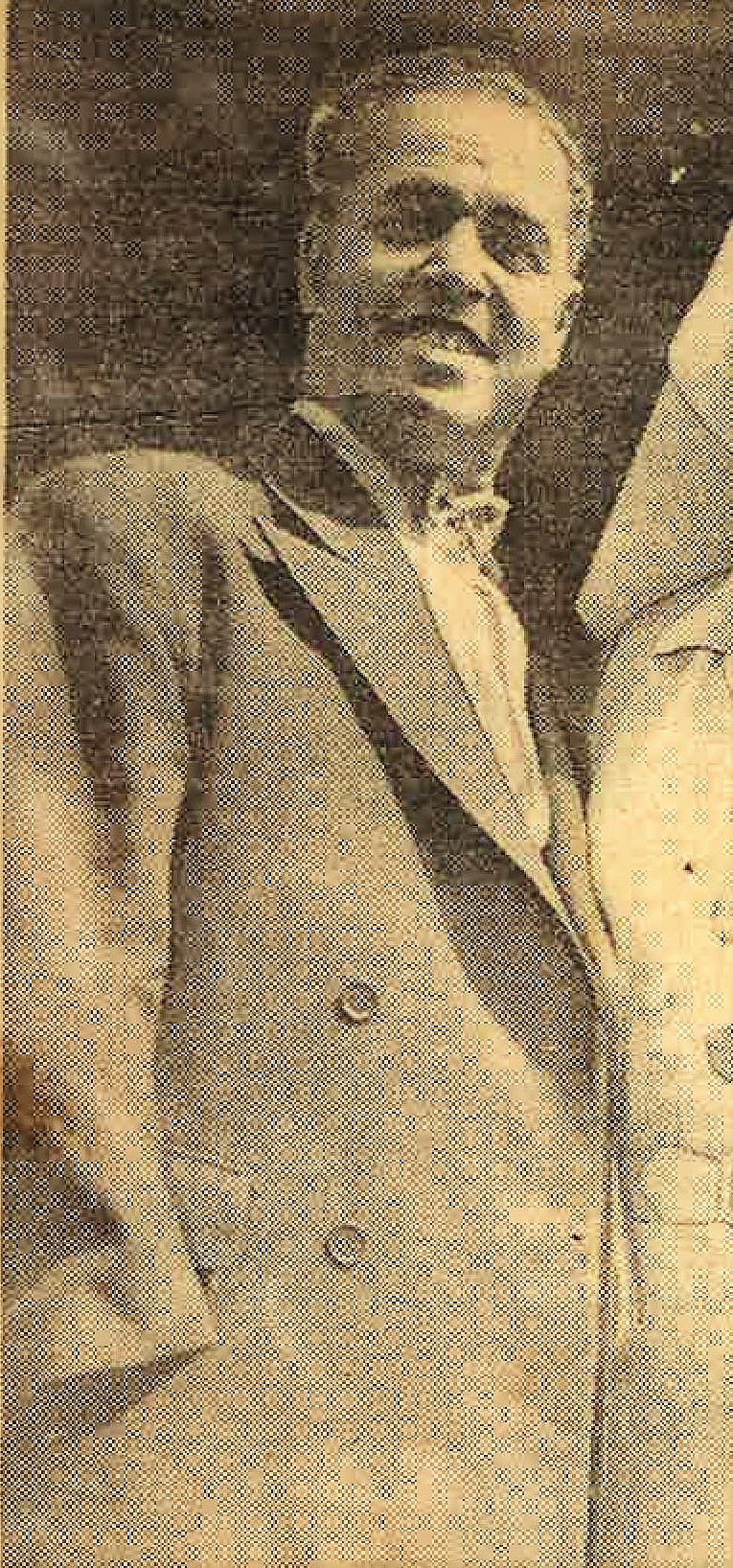
Curley Christian in 1936

=== Second World War ===
The regiment mobilized The Winnipeg Grenadiers (Machine Gun), CASF, on 1 September 1939. It was redesignated as the 1st Battalion, The Winnipeg Grenadiers (Machine Gun), CASF, on 7 November 1940, and as the 1st Battalion, The Winnipeg Grenadiers, CASF, on 15 March 1941. It served in Jamaica and at the Imperial fortress colony of Bermuda (home base of the America and West Indies Station of the Royal Navy, with a military garrison that had been part of that of Nova Scotia, the second nearest landfall from Bermuda after the United States, under the Commander-in-Chief, Maritime provinces 'til Bermuda and Newfoundland, both having been parts of British North America, were left out of the 1867 Confederation of Canada, and which had been garrisoned during the First World War successively by the Royal Canadian Regiment, and the 38th Battalion (Ottawa) and 163rd Battalion (French-Canadian) of the Canadian Expeditionary Force (CEF)) on garrison duty from May 1940 to October 1941 (the detachment assigned to the Bermuda Garrison moved to Aruba in August 1940).

==== Hong Kong ====
On 27 October 1941, it embarked for Hong Kong as a part of C Force, where it was destroyed while fighting in defence of the colony during the Battle of Hong Kong (8–25 December 1941).

Company Sergeant-Major John Robert Osborn, VC (2 January 1899 – 19 December 1941) was a 42-year-old warrant officer second class and the CSM of "A" Company. He was awarded the Victoria Cross for his actions in the fighting for Hong Kong on 19 December 1941.

His Victoria Cross citation reads, in part:

The enemy threw a grenade which landed in a position where it was impossible to pick it up and return it in time. Shouting a warning to his comrades, this gallant Warrant Officer threw himself on the grenade, which exploded, killing him instantly. His self-sacrifice undoubtedly saved the lives of many others.

Company Sergeant-Major Osborn was an inspiring example throughout the defence, which he assisted so magnificently in maintaining against an overwhelming enemy force for over eight and a half hours, and in his death, he displayed the highest quality of heroism and self-sacrifice.

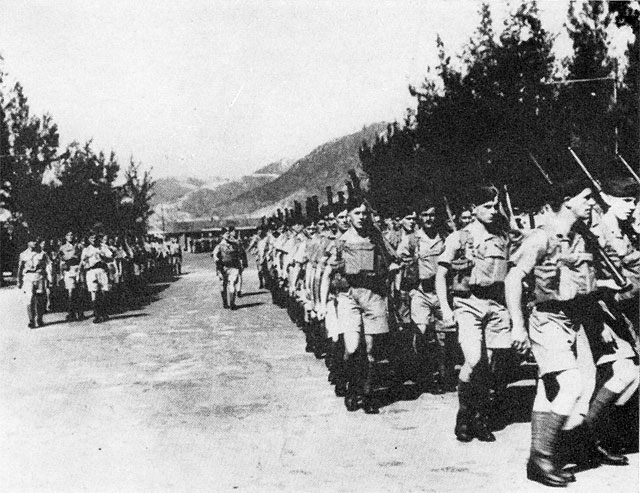
On 16 November 1941, the Winnipeg Grenadiers arrived in Hong Kong. Yet, they could not reverse the outcome of the Battle of Hong Kong.

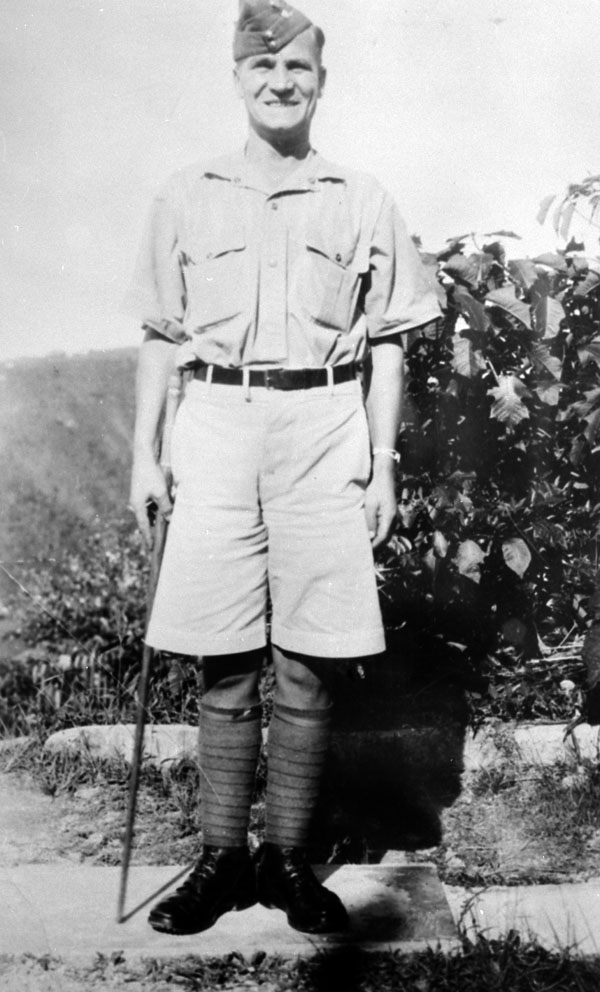
Company Sergeant-Major John Robert Osborn, VC

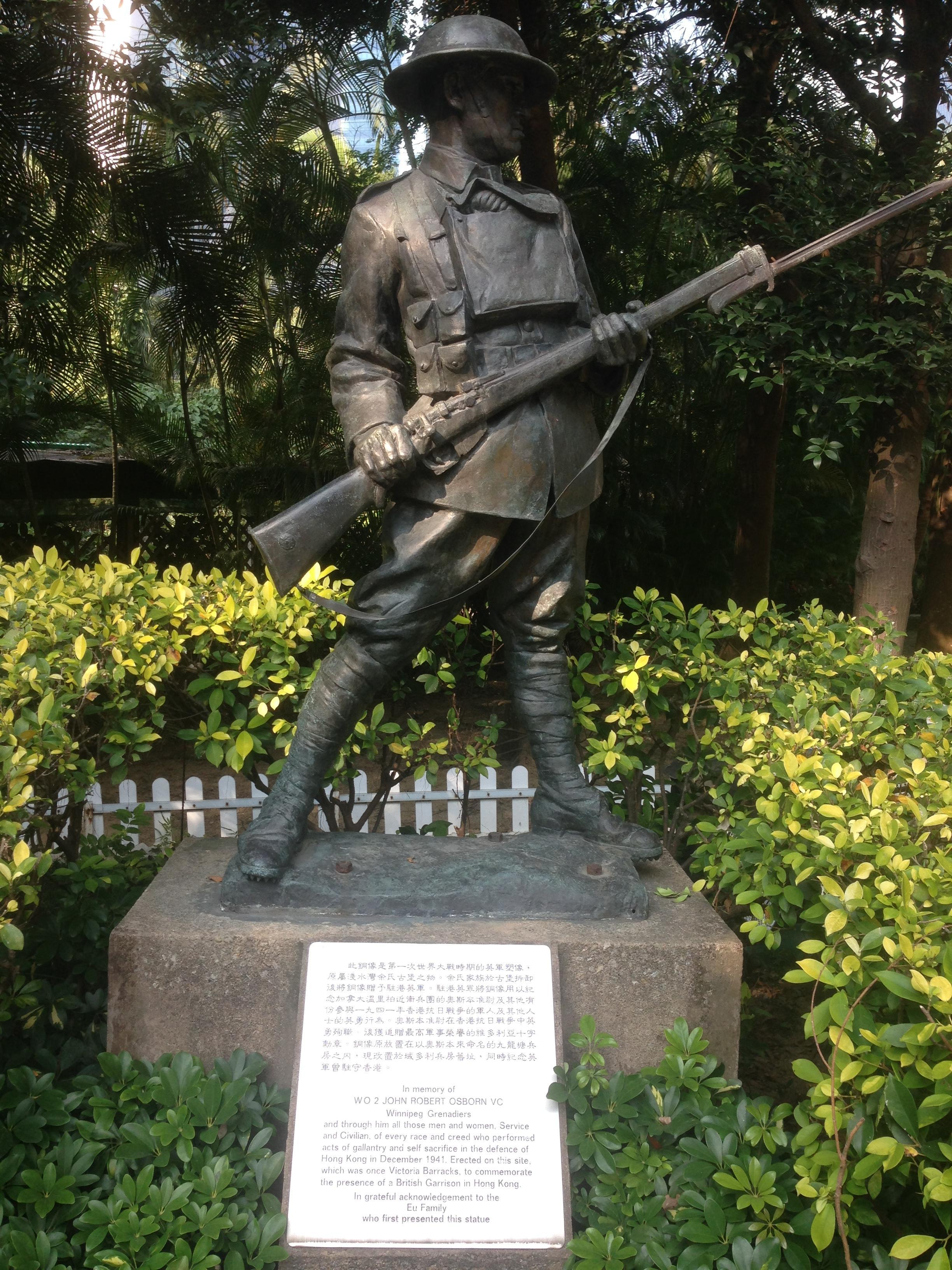
Statue of an anonymous World War I soldier from statuary collection of Eu Tong Sen. Also visible is the Battle of Hong Kong memorial plaque dedicated to all the defenders of Hong Kong in December 1941 through John Robert Osborn

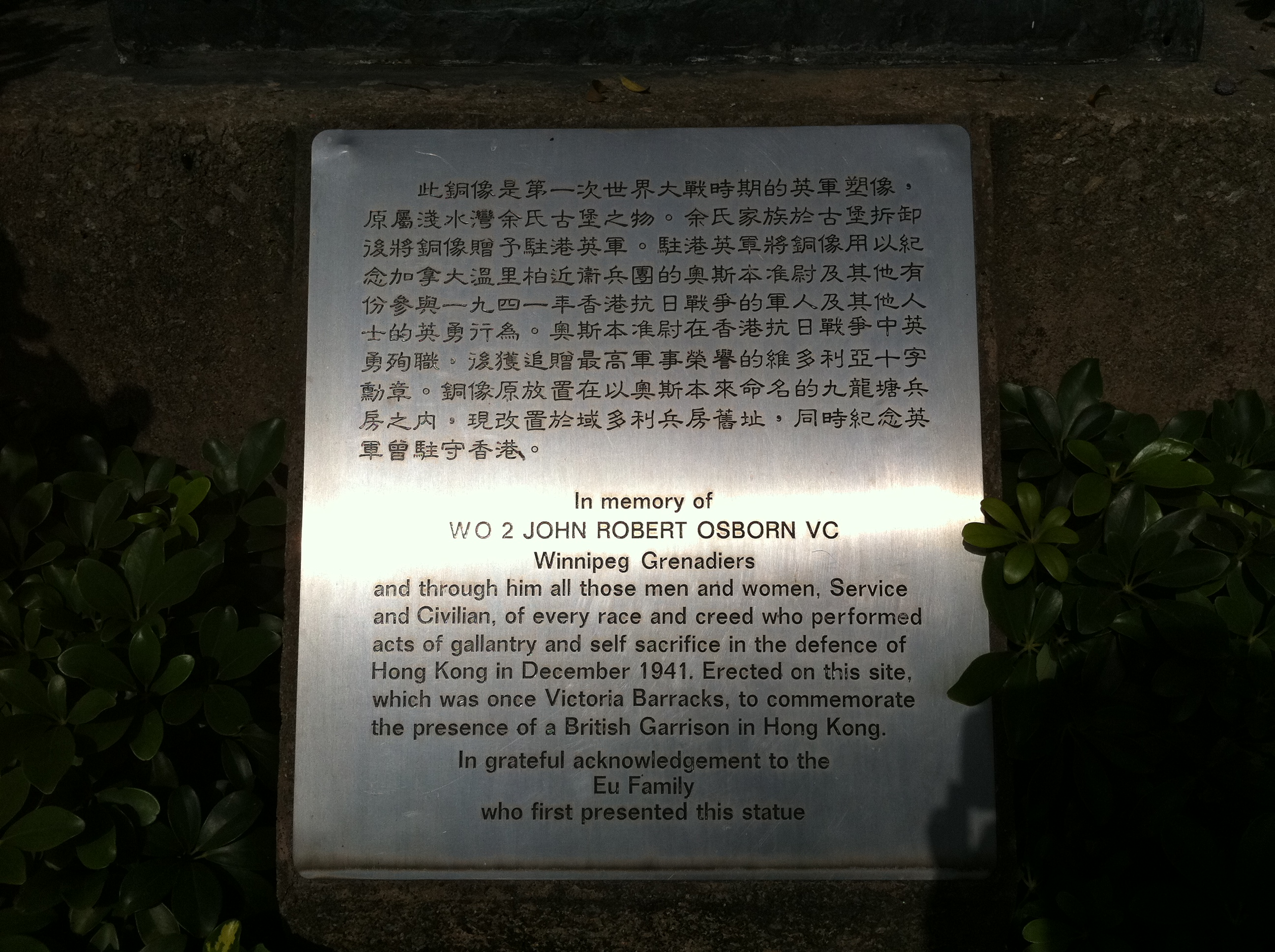
Memorial plaque dedicated to all the defenders of Hong Kong in December 1941 through John Robert Osborn and to commemorate the British Garrison at Hong Kong.

==== Home defence ====
The 1st Battalion was reconstituted on 10 January 1942. It served in Canada in a home defence role as part of the Prince Rupert Defences, 8th Canadian Infantry Division. It took part in the expedition to Kiska, Alaska, as a component of the 13th Canadian Infantry Brigade Group, serving there from 16 August 1943 to 22 December 1943.

It embarked for Great Britain on 25 May 1944. On 1 November 1944, it was absorbed by the 3rd Canadian Infantry Training Battalion, CASF, and designated as the 3rd Canadian Infantry Training Battalion, Type A (Winnipeg Grenadiers), CASF. On 5 July 1945, it was converted and redesignated the No. 10 Canadian Repatriation Depot, Type "T". The depot was disbanded on 28 January 1946.

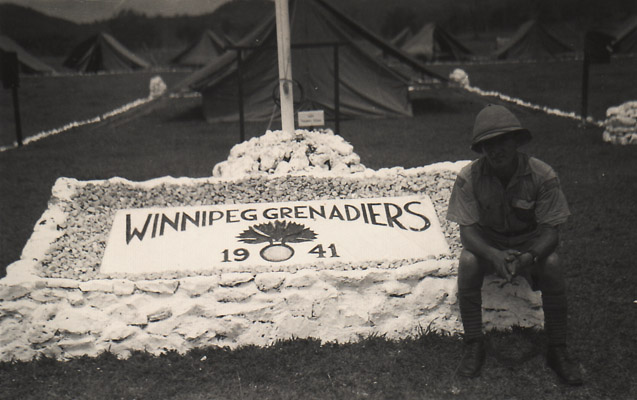
Winnipeg Grenadiers Camp, 1941

== Alliances ==
On 15 August 1914, an alliance was authorized with the Prince of Wales's Leinster Regiment (Royal Canadians). This regiment, first raised in Canada in 1858 as the 100th (Prince of Wales's Royal Canadian) Regiment of Foot, was disbanded (with five other Irish regiments) in July 1922 due to the division of Ireland. The regiment's present alliance, which dates from 6 November 1933, is the Scots Guards.

== Battle honours ==
Battle honours in small capitals are for large operations, and campaigns and those in lowercase are for more specific battles. Bold type indicates honours authorized to be emblazoned on regimental colours.

Regimental colour

=== Great War ===
- **Ypres, 1915, '17**
- Festubert, 1915
- Mount Sorrel
- **Somme, 1916**
- Ancre Heights
- Ancre, 1916
- **Arras, 1917, '18**
- **Vimy, 1917**
- Hill 70
- **Passchendaele**
- **Amiens**
- Scarpe, 1918
- **Drocourt–Quéant**
- **Hindenburg Line**
- **Canal du Nord**
- **Valenciennes**
- Sambre
- France and Flanders, 1915–18

=== Second World War ===
- **Hong Kong**
- **South-East Asia, 1941**

== Cadet corps ==
The cadet corps was originally formed on 15 February 1917 and named 526 100th Grenadiers Cadet Corps. It was disbanded 13 November 1931. Its affiliation was 100th Winnipeg Grenadiers.

In 1946 members of the regiment through the Grenadiers Winnipeg Incorporated took steps to reform the cadet corps. On 1 October 1946, the cadet corps was authorized under the title 526 The Winnipeg Grenadiers Cadet Corps. The cadet corps parades at Minto Armoury in Winnipeg.
