= 11th Battalion, CEF =

11th Canadian Expeditionary Force Battalion
- Active: 10 August 1914 – 12 October 1917
- Disbanded: 12 October 1917
- Country: Canada
- Size: Battalion
- Engagements: World War I

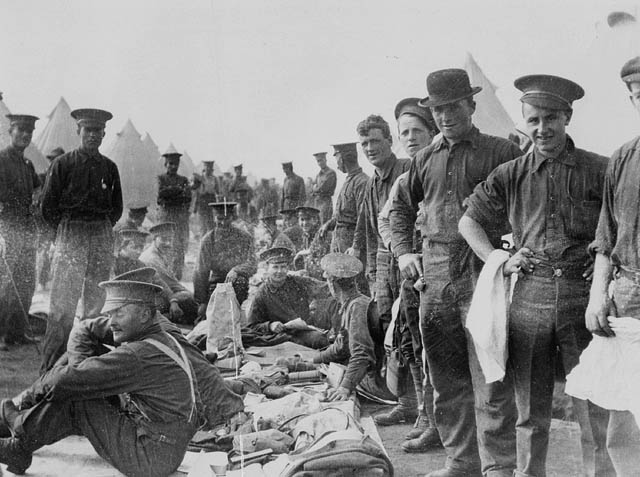
Kit inspection, 11th Battalion, Valcartier, Quebec

The 11th Battalion, CEF, an infantry battalion of the Canadian Expeditionary Force, was authorized on 10 August 1914 and embarked for Great Britain on 30 September 1914. It was redesignated as the 11th Reserve Infantry Battalion, CEF, on 29 April 1915, to provide reinforcements to the Canadian Corps in the field. On 4 January 1917, its personnel, along with the personnel of the 100th Battalion (Winnipeg Grenadiers), CEF, were absorbed by a new 11th Reserve Battalion (Manitoba), CEF. The battalion was disbanded on 12 October 1917.

The battalion recruited in Prince Albert, Moose Jaw, Regina and Saskatoon, Saskatchewan and Winnipeg, Manitoba and mobilized at Camp Valcartier, Quebec.

The 11th Reserve Battalion formed part of the Canadian Training Depot at Tidworth Camp on the Salisbury Plain.

The 11th Battalion, CEF, had three Officers Commanding:

- Lt. Col. R. Burritt, 22 September 1914 – 23 August 1915
- Lt. Col. A. Dulmage, 23 August 1915 – 15 September 1915
- Lt. Col. A.E. Carpenter, 26 November 1915 – 27 April 1916
- Lt. Col. P. Walker, 8 May 1916 – 4 January 1917

== Perpetuations ==
The 11th Battalion, CEF, is perpetuated by The Winnipeg Grenadiers, currently on the Supplementary Order of Battle.

== Battle honours ==
The battalion was awarded the following battle honours:

- Ypres 1915, '17
- Festubert, 1915
- Mount Sorrel
- Ancre Heights
- Ancre, 1916
- Arras, 1917, '18
- Vimy, 1917
- Hill 70
- Passchendaele
- Amiens
- Scarpe, 1918
- Drocourt-Quéant
- Hindenburg Line
- Canal du Nord
- Valenciennes
- Sambre
- France and Flanders, 1915-18
- The Great War 1914-17

== See also ==
- List of infantry battalions in the Canadian Expeditionary Force
