= 100th Battalion (Winnipeg Grenadiers), CEF =

- Active: 1915-1917
- Country: Canada
- Branch: Canadian Expeditionary Force
- Role: Infantry
- Engagements: First World War

The 100th Battalion (Winnipeg Grenadiers), CEF, was an infantry battalion of the Great War Canadian Expeditionary Force.

== History ==
The 100th Battalion was authorized on 22 December 1915 and embarked for Great Britain on 18 September 1916, where it provided reinforcements to the Canadian Corps in the field until 20 January 1917, when its personnel were absorbed by the 11th Reserve Battalion (Manitoba), CEF. The battalion disbanded on 1 September 1917.

The 100th Battalion recruited in, and was mobilized at, Winnipeg, Manitoba.

The 100th Battalion was commanded by Lt.-Col. J.B. Mitchell from 18 September 1916 to 4 January 1917.

== Battle honours ==
The 100th Battalion was awarded the battle honour THE GREAT WAR 1916-17.

== Perpetuation ==
The 100th Battalion, CEF is perpetuated by The Winnipeg Grenadiers.

== See also ==
- List of infantry battalions in the Canadian Expeditionary Force

== Sources ==
- Canadian Expeditionary Force 1914–1919 by Col. G.W.L. Nicholson, CD, Queen's Printer, Ottawa, Ontario, 1962
