= 163rd Battalion (French-Canadian), CEF =

The 163rd (Canadien-Francais) Battalion, CEF was a unit in the Canadian Expeditionary Force during the First World War. Based in Montreal, Quebec, the unit began recruiting in late 1915 throughout the province of Quebec. In May 1916, the battalion sailed for the Imperial fortress of Bermuda, where it replaced the 38th Battalion (Ottawa), CEF and remained on garrison duty until late November of the same year. After arriving in England, the battalion was absorbed into the 10th Reserve Battalion on January 8, 1917. The 163rd (Canadien-Francais) Battalion, CEF had one Officer Commanding: Lieut-Col. H. DesRosiers.

The journalist Olivar Asselin was a member of the battalion.

The battalion is perpetuated by Les Fusiliers de Sherbrooke.

== See also ==
- Bermudians in the Canadian Expeditionary Force
