= 38th Battalion (Ottawa), CEF =

38th Battalion,
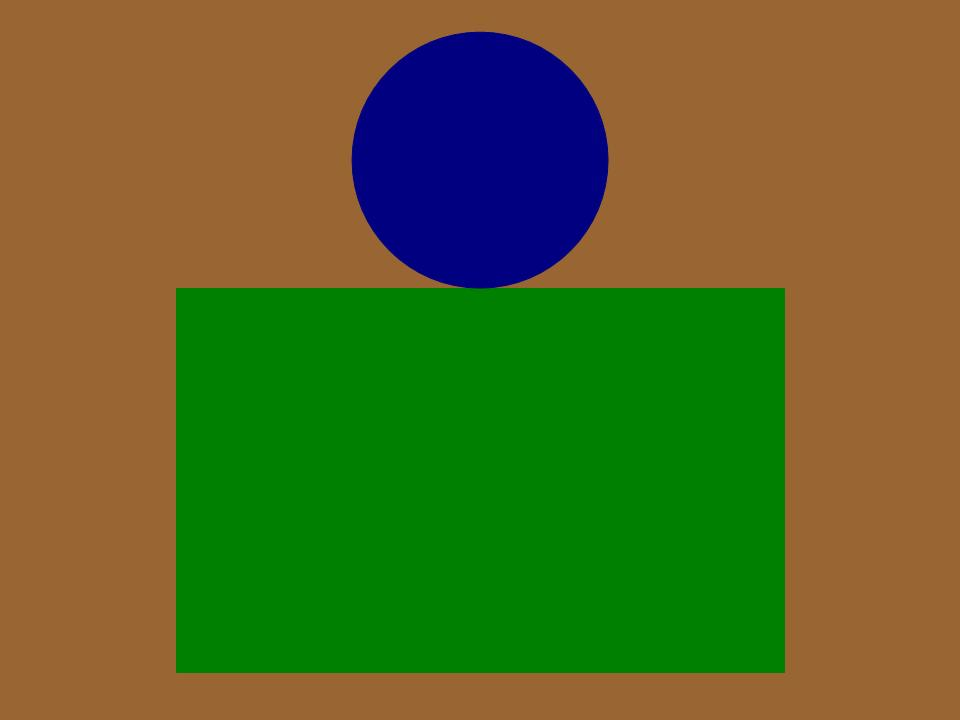
- The distinguishing patch of the 38th Battalion (Ottawa), CEF.
- Active: 1915–1920
- Country: Canada
- Type: Infantry

Cap badge of the 38th Battalion, CEF

The 38th Battalion, CEF was a unit of the First World War Canadian Expeditionary Force. It was mobilized in Ottawa and recruited in Ottawa, Brockville, Perth, Prescott and Alexandria. An initial draft of five officers and 251 other ranks was sent to England on 24 June 1915. The battalion embarked at Montreal on 1 August 1915, aboard the Caledonian, disembarking in Bermuda on 12 August 1915. Its strength was 35 officers and 959 other ranks. The battalion embarked at Bermuda on 30 May 1916, aboard the Grampian, disembarking in England on 9 June 1916. Its strength was 35 officers and 1001 other ranks. The battalion arrived in France on 13 August 1916, becoming part of the 4th Canadian Division, 12th Canadian Infantry Brigade. It was later reinforced by the 7th Canadian Reserve Battalion. The battalion returned to England on 6 May 1919, arrived in Canada on 13 June 1919, was demobilized in Ottawa on 15 June 1919, and was disbanded by General Order 149 of 15 September 1920.

== Perpetuation ==
The 38th Battalion (Ottawa), CEF, is perpetuated by The Cameron Highlanders of Ottawa.

== History ==
=== Formation and training ===
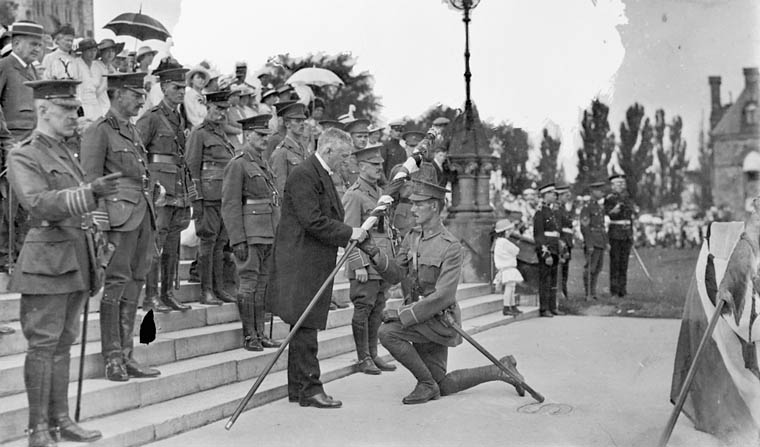
Presentation of colours to 38th Battalion 31 July 1915

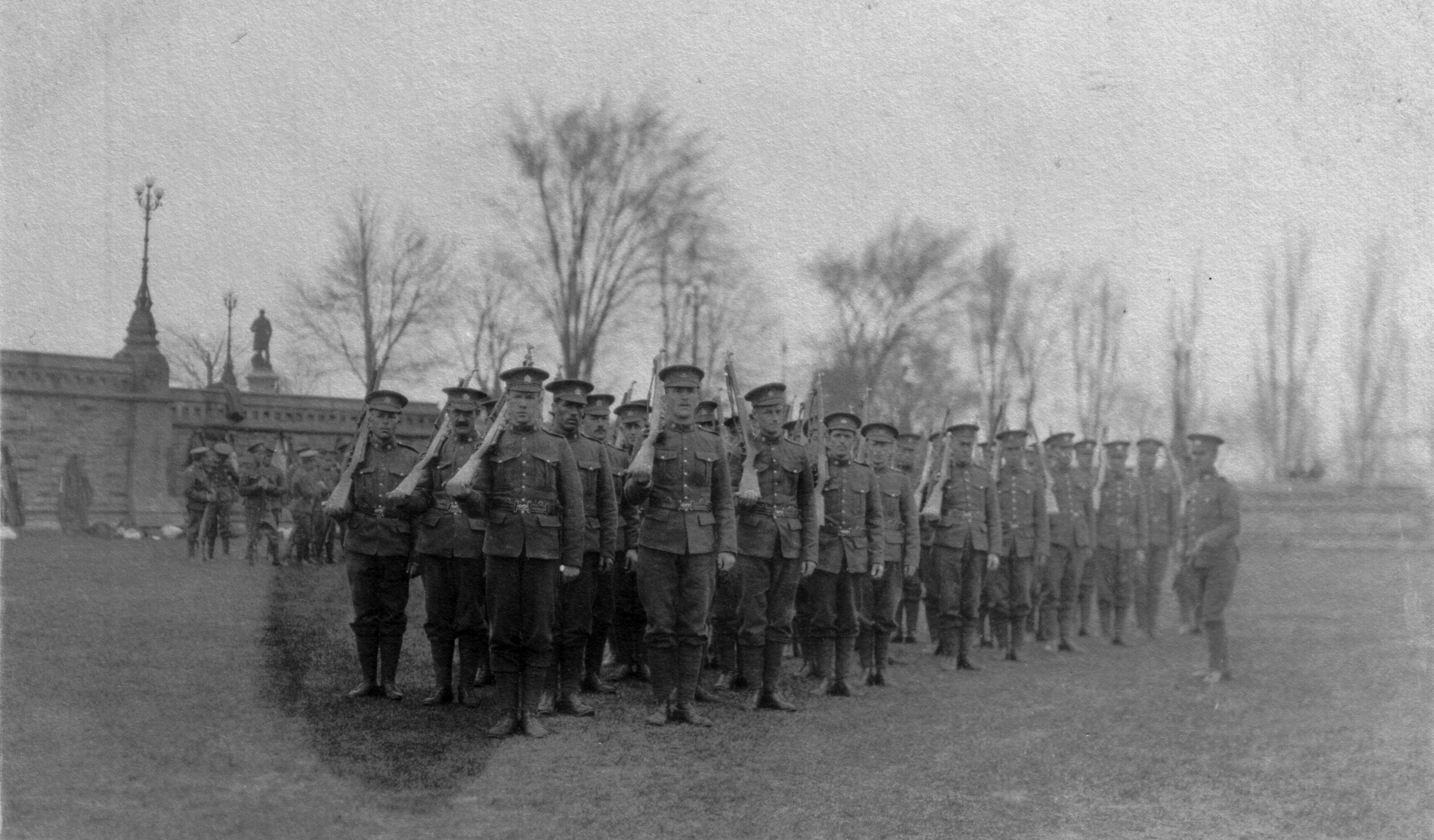
38th Battalion company inspection before going overseas (about 1915)

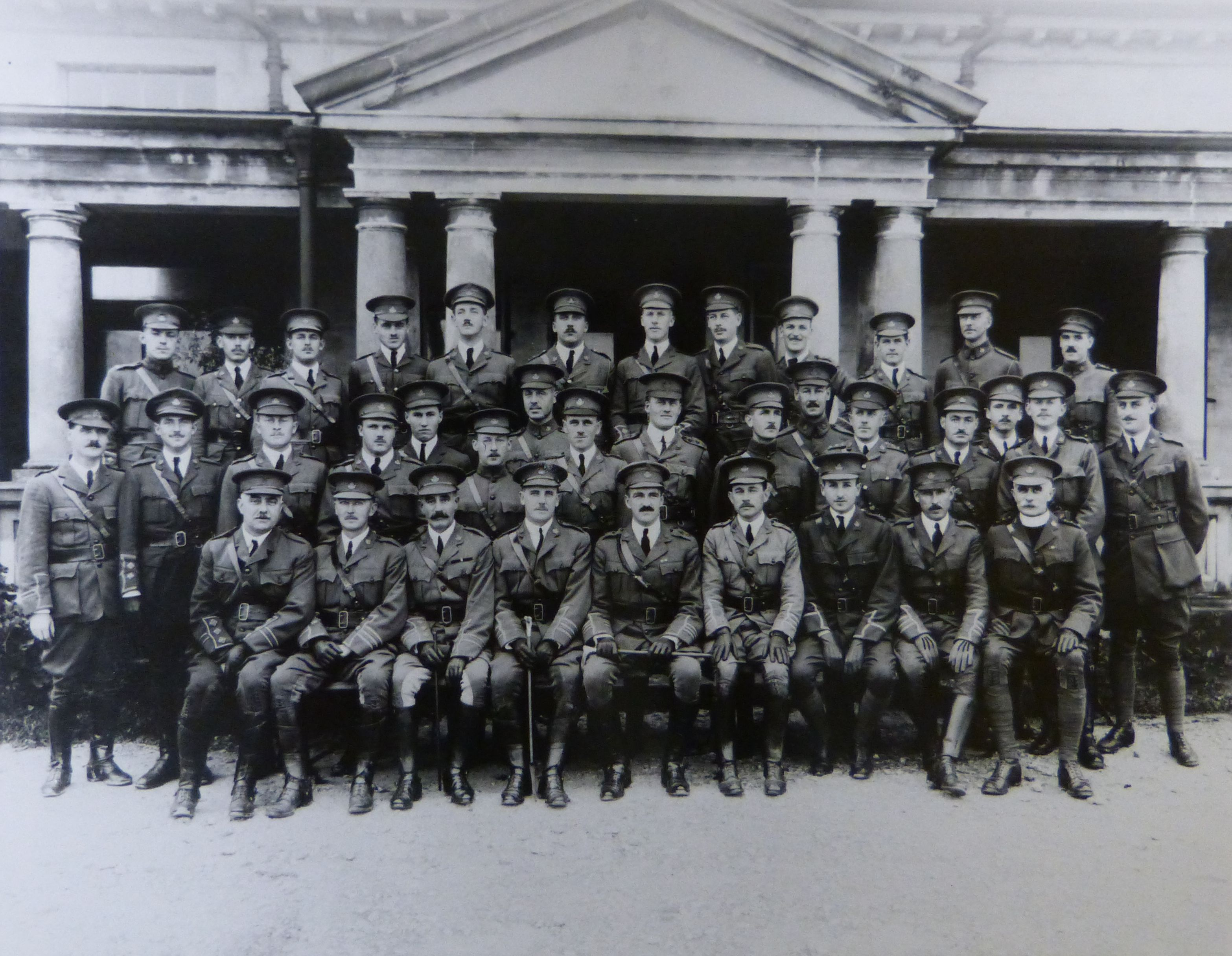
Officers of the 38th Battalion at Prospect Camp Bermuda in 1915

The 38th Battalion was authorized on 28 December 1914, under the command of Lieutenant Colonel R. Gordon Stewart (son of Ottawa politician Robert Stewart), commanding officer of the 43rd Duke of Cornwall's Own Rifles, Ottawa, although recruiting had gone on since November. It was the first complete infantry unit to be raised in Ottawa; its badge bears the city's motto, "Advance". In January 1915, Colonel Stewart was appointed brigade major of the 4th Canadian Infantry Brigade, 2nd Canadian Division; Lieutenant Colonel C. M. Edwards (also an officer of the DCOR) was given command of the 38th.

In January 1915, arrangements were made to use the former Ottawa Ladies' College for battalion headquarters. On 5 February the 38th took charge of the building, and on 8 February the first daily orders were posted. The first company to be organized was A Company, under the command of Capt. R. F. Parkinson of the 43rd Regiment; its personnel was largely made up of the old 43rd. B Company was also recruited by the end of January under the command of Capt. A. C. Ross of the Governor-General's Foot Guards. C Company was mobilized in the outlying districts of eastern Ontario (headquartered at Smith's Falls) under the command of Capt. A. W. Gray. D Company was supplied entirely from the Officers' Training Corps of McGill University, with Capt. Gregor Barclay in command.

Initial training was carried out in Ottawa; in April 1915 the battalion was inspected at Lansdowne Park by Prince Arthur, Duke of Connaught and Strathearn, who was enthusiastic about the efficiency the battalion had reached. The 38th left Ottawa for Barriefield Camp on 25 May. Soon after its arrival, it was required to provide a complete company for a reinforcing draft to proceed overseas immediately. D Company was chosen, and sailed 29 May 1915, from Montreal on the Northland. A replacement D Company was organized in eastern Ontario under the command of Capt. W. S. Wood.

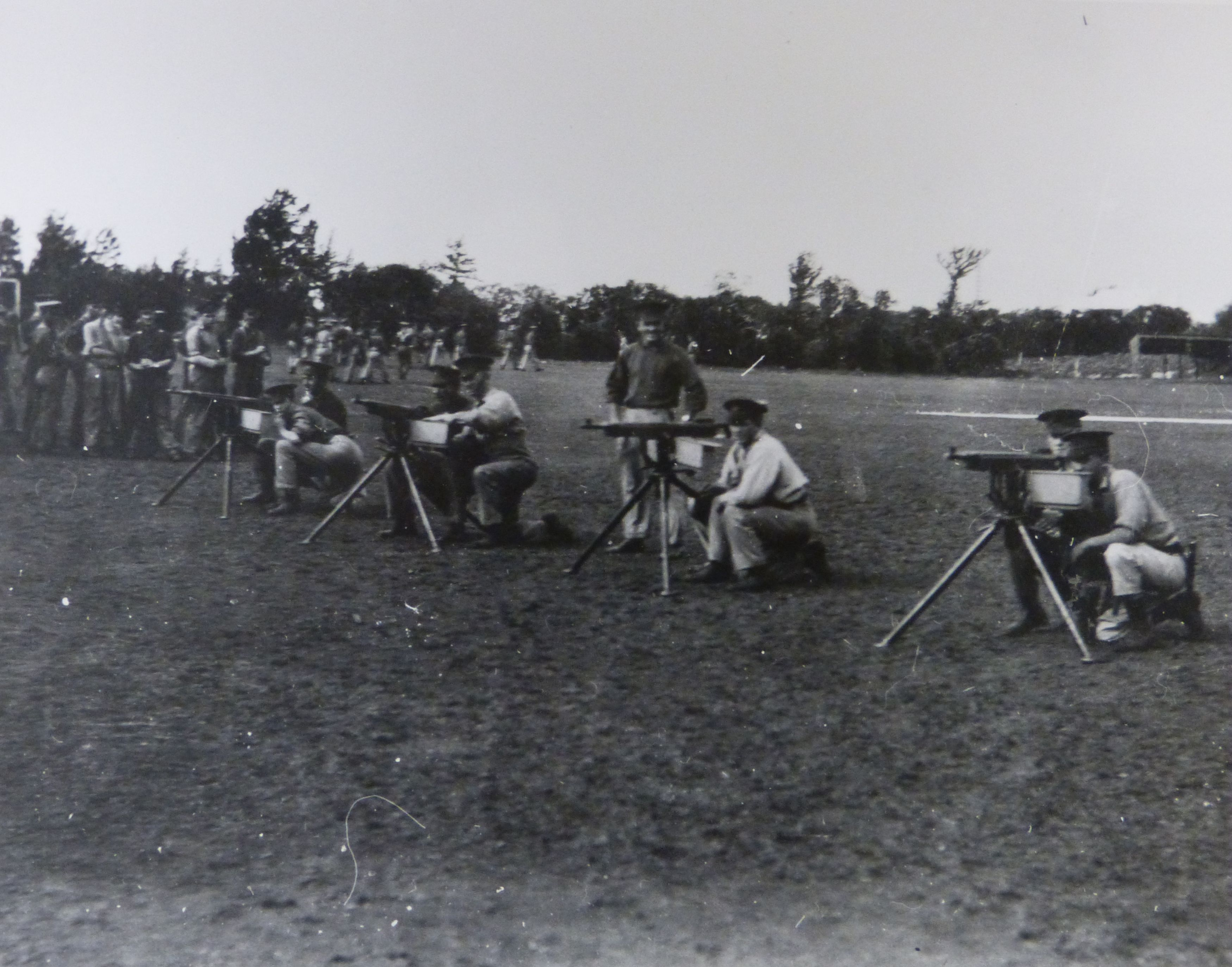
38th Battalion with M1895 Colt–Browning machine guns in Bermuda in 1915

A second reinforcing draft was ordered from the 38th; 5 officers and 250 other ranks were selected from A, B, and C Companies to complete this draft. Commanded by Captain A. C. Ross, it included the following officers: Lieutenant A. C. Fraser of A Company, Lieutenant B. R. Bechel of B Company, Lieutenant F. Smyth of C Company and Lieutenant A. B. Parker of D Company. It sailed from Montreal on the Missanable 24 June 1915. In July, the 38th was ordered to complete its training and relieve the Royal Canadian Regiment (which had itself replaced the 2nd Battalion of the Lincolnshire Regiment of the British Army in 1914) performing garrison duty in Bermuda. The Duke of Connaught again inspected the battalion, pointing out that the 38th would be the first battalion (other than regular, militia and volunteer units of the British Army) to occupy the Imperial fortress of Bermuda—one of the most important military and naval bases of the empire.

Before the battalion left Ottawa on 31 July 1915, the regimental colours were consecrated by the battalion Chaplain, Captain H. I. Horsey, and presented by the Duke of Connaught. The original colour party was composed of Lieutenants Stronach and R. F. Greene and Company Sergeant Majors Carroll, Wilkinson and Vance. On the night of 31 July they embarked on the SS Caledonia at Montreal. The transport proceeded down the Gulf of St. Lawrence, but was ordered back to Quebec City due to the suspected presence of submarines off the Atlantic coast. The battalion disembarked at Lévis, and two days later proceeded to Halifax by train. The ship sailed on to Halifax and picked up the 38th 7 August. They sailed on 8 August, landing in Bermuda on 13 August.

=== Bermuda ===
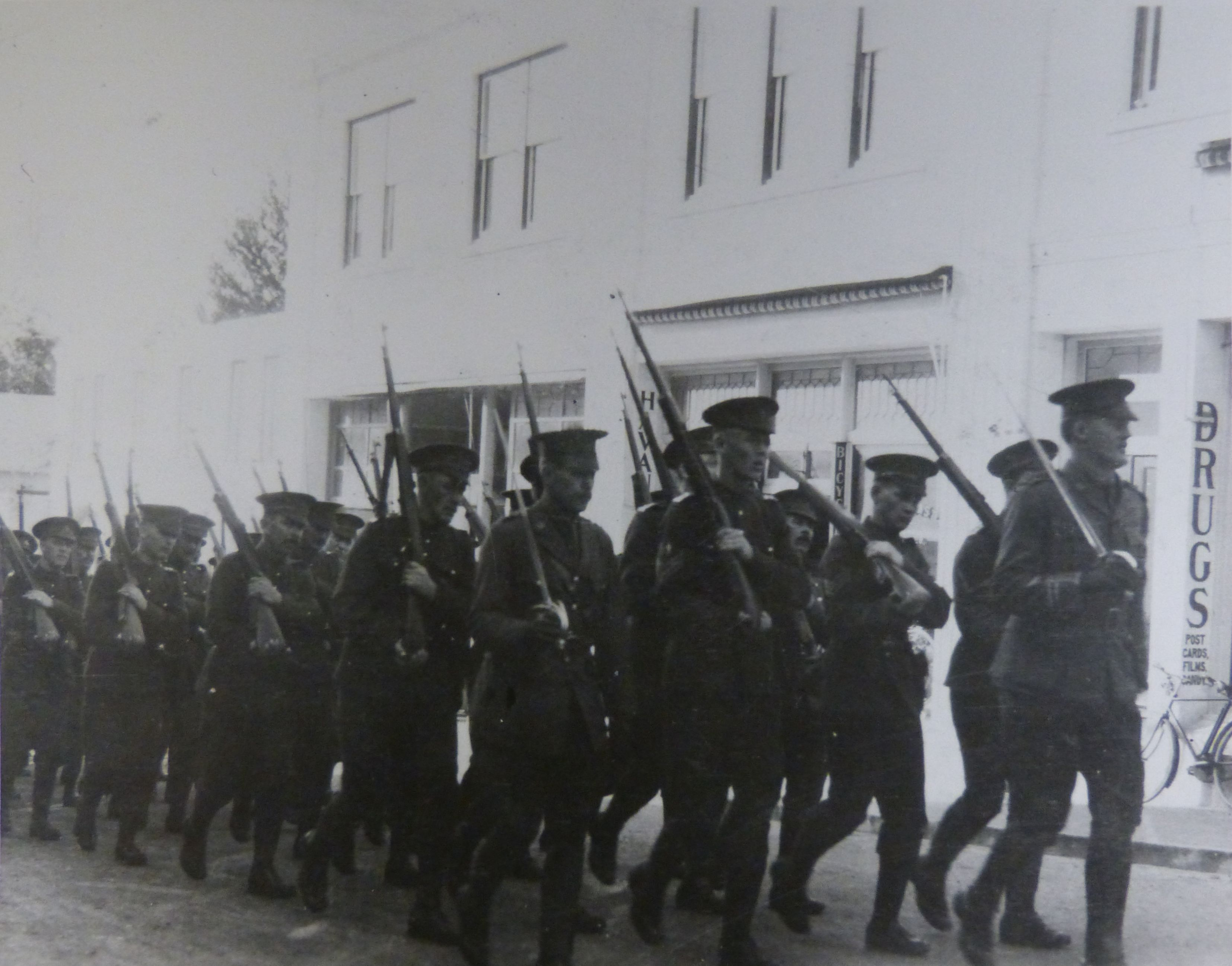
38th Battalion on Queen Street, City of Hamilton, Bermuda in 1915

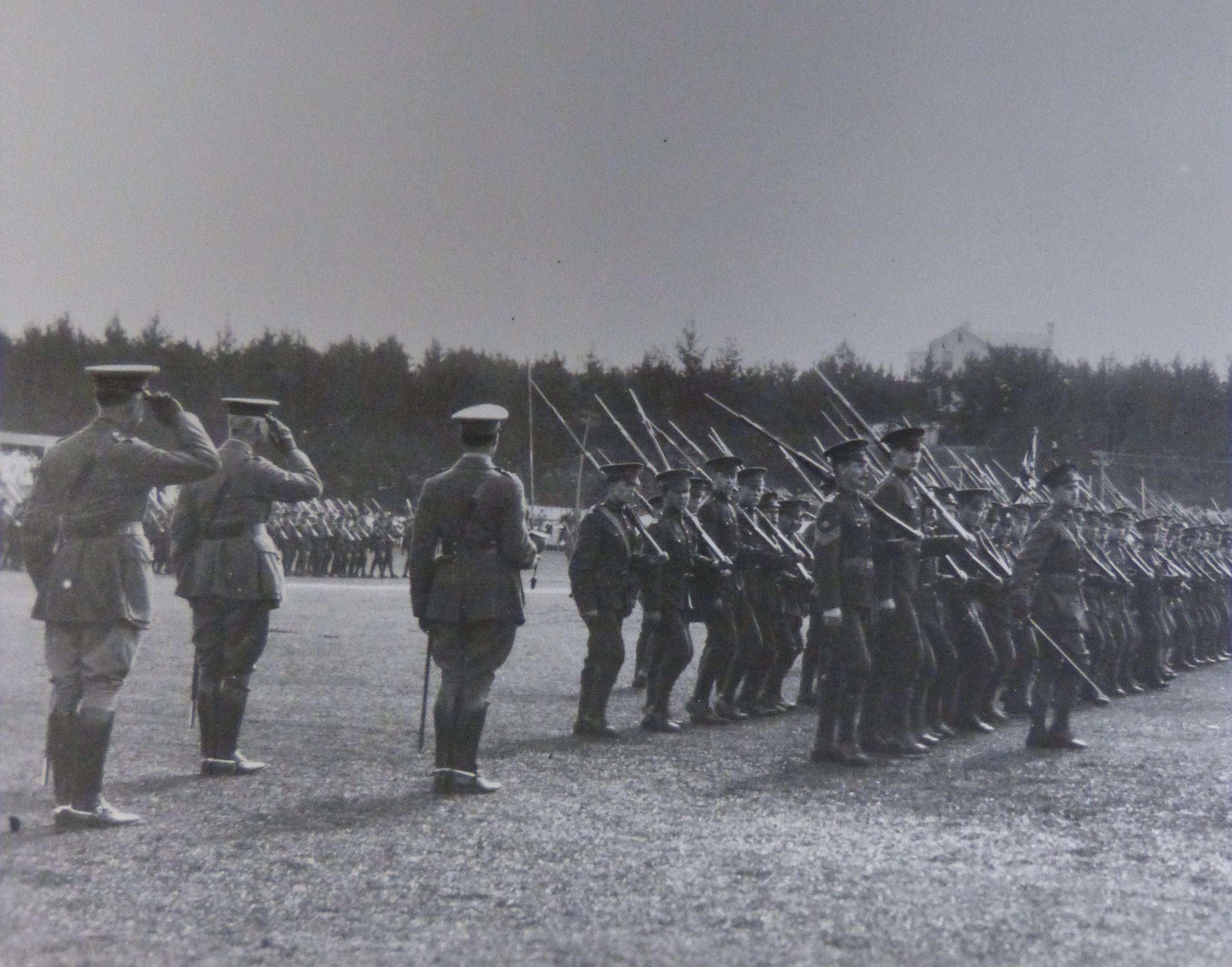
38th Battalion parade on field in Bermuda in 1915

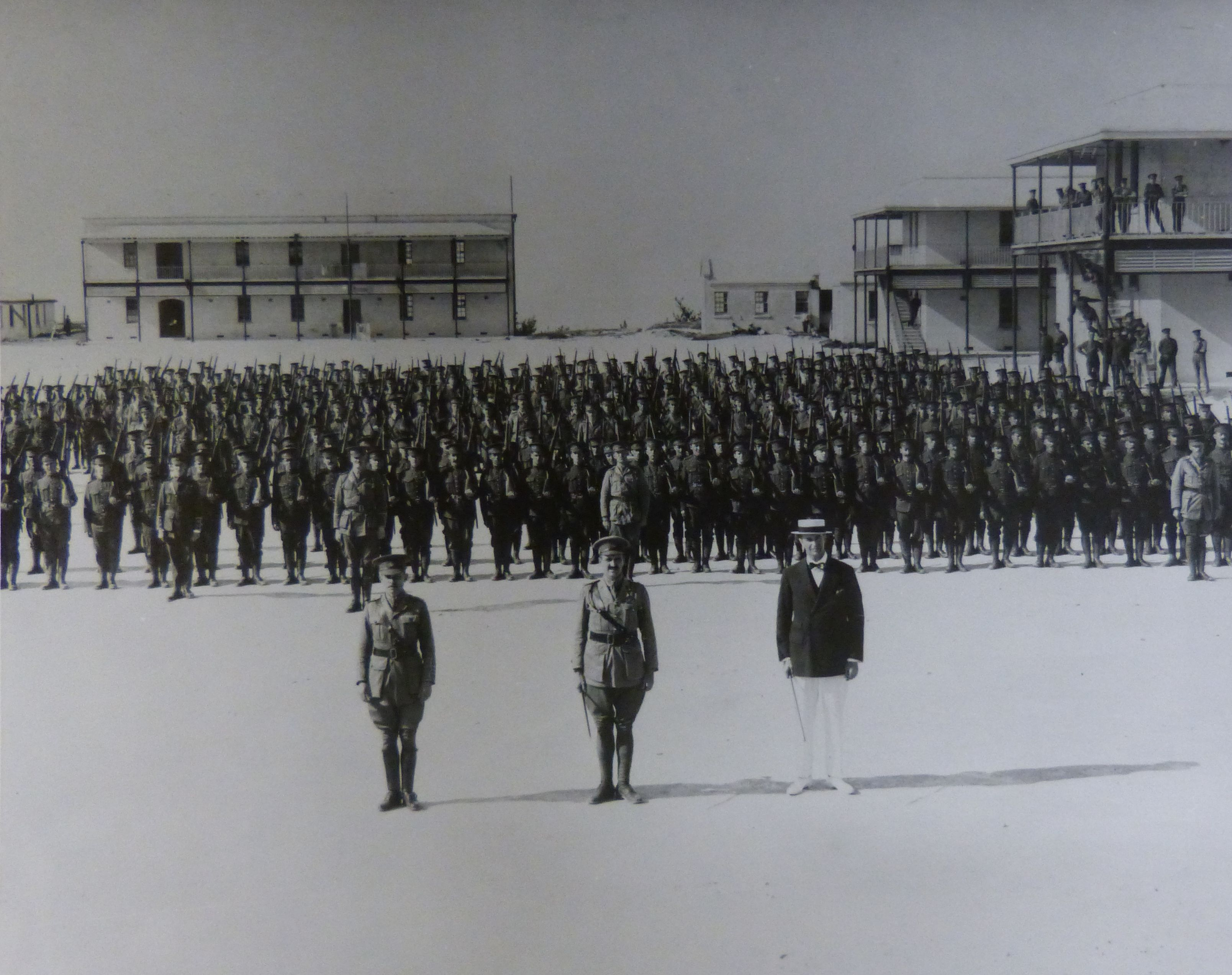
38th Battalion at Prospect Camp, Bermuda, in 1915

The unit was welcomed to the Bermuda Garrison by the Governor and Commander-in-Chief (or General Officer Commanding-in-Chief) of Bermuda, Lieut. General Sir George Bullock. Bermuda was divided into three military districts: the Eastern Military district (controlled from St. George's Garrison, the original 18th Century military base in Bermuda), the Central Military District (controlled from Prospect Camp, which also housed the Bermuda Command Headquarters); and the Western Military District, controlled from Clarence Barracks on the co-joined Boaz Island and Watford Island). Headquarters, D Company and half of C Company were located at Prospect Barracks, in Devonshire, near the City of Hamilton; A Company were at Clarence Barracks on Boaz and Watford Islands, close to the Royal Naval Dockyard on Ireland Island, and the other half of C Company was at St. David's Island (in the Eastern Military District), where the coastal artillery guns of St. David's Battery, which guarded the entrance to the main shipping channel through Bermuda's surrounding reef, required protection against rear attack by an enemy shore party. Active training and garrison duties were immediately begun and with the assistance of Imperial Army Instructors, the battalion reached a high state of efficiency. On 8 February 1916, the 38th was inspected by the Governor and Commander-in-Chief of Bermuda, who forwarded official reports to the British War Office and militia headquarters at Ottawa declaring the unit fit to take its place in the field alongside the finest regiments in the British Army. Documentary film footage was recorded of the battalion during its time in Bermuda.

The 163rd Battalion reached Bermuda on 29 May 1916, to relieve the 38th and the latter sailed for Devonport, England on 31 May. The battalion had gained at least eleven recruits in Bermuda, including at least three who had previously served in the Bermuda Volunteer Rifle Corps (BVRC). The Bermuda Militia Artillery (BMA) and the BVRC, normally local-service reserve units of the British Army, both sent two contingents of volunteers to the Western Front during the war (in 1916 and 1917, and 1915 and 1916 respectively). It had been ordered before the departure of the 38th that no further contingents would be sent abroad by the BVRC, but many of its soldiers were permitted to join CEF battalions, either in Bermuda or Canada. Other Bermudians resident in Canada also joined the CEF (see Bermudians in the Canadian Expeditionary Force). They arrived on 13 June, and proceeded to Bordon Camp. On the following day the 38th was inspected by Major-General D. Watson, G. O. C. of the newly formed 4th Canadian Division, who was so favourably impressed with the unit's standard of efficiency that he accepted it for his division. The 38th became a unit of the 12th Canadian Infantry Brigade at Bramshott Camp, commanded by Brig. General Lord Brooke. On 1 July the 38th (and the rest of the 4th Canadian Division) was inspected by His Majesty the King. Early in August, embarkation orders for the 4th Division were received; the 38th sailed from Southampton to Le Havre on 13 August. Two days later they entrained for Poperinghe, Belgium, reaching there on 17 August. That evening half the battalion (A and C Companies, commanded by Major Parkinson) was sent forward to support trenches east of Ypres; by morning, they had received their baptism of shell fire.

=== Western Front ===
The battalion took over the front line immediately east of Kemmel Hill (the southern end of the Ypres salient), where they remained until 23 September 1916. On that date, the 38th (and other units of the 4th Canadian Division) began its march south to join the remainder of the Canadian Corps in the Somme operations. A stop of one week was made near the village of Epileque for refitting and training. The battalion entrained at Saint-Omer, reaching Canaas on 9 October and bivouacking on the west slope of Tara Hill. Until 17 November, the 38th was occupied with work parties and periods in the front line.

On 17 November, the 38th took over a section of front line from the 11th Battalion of the Royal Dublin Fusiliers as part of the attack on Desire Trench and Grandcourt. The 38th went "over the top" for the first time on 18 November and all objectives were gained. The battalion had about 500 casualties, including 5 officers killed and 11 wounded. The battalion was relieved on 20 November, and what was left of it returned to Albert. After several days of reorganization, the march to the Vimy Ridge front began. The first three weeks of December were spent billeted in Bruay-la-Buissière where reinforcements were received, bringing the unit up to strength. The commander of the Canadian Corps, General Sit Julian Byng, inspected the 38th on 14 December. On Christmas night 1916 the 38th went into the line on Vimy Ridge at Souchez, relieving the 13th Royal Highlanders of Montreal. From then until the attack on 9 April, the battalion remained on the front. Many patrol encounters took place in No Man's Land; on 22 February the 38th raided the enemy's front line with a party of 125, inflicting heavy casualties.

==== Vimy Ridge ====
The 38th was relieved on 28 March and went into brigade support, returning to the line on the evening of 4 April ready for the "big show". When the attack began on 9 April, the task assigned the battalion was an objective well over the crest of the ridge; before evening, all objectives had been gained. Casualties were about 400 including Lieut. Col. Edwards, who was wounded. Major R. F. Parkinson assumed command of the battalion during Col. Edwards' three-month absence. The 38th was relieved on 13 April and was withdrawn to Hersin-Coupigny for reorganization. They returned to the line on 19 April, taking up a position east of Vimy Ridge near Lens. From 26 to 28 June, the 38th captured the towns of La Coulotte and Avion; meeting particularly stubborn resistance in Avion, the battalion's casualties during this three-day period were about 250.

They were relieved the night of 1 July, and withdrawn for three weeks of reorganization and training. King George V inspected the battalion on 11 July; August and September were spent in the line at Avion, and on 4 October it was learned that instead of using the Canadian Corps to attack the Mericout-Sallauminee Ridge, they were to be sent back to the Ypres front to take part in the Passchendaele operations. By mid-October, the 38th was en route to Belgium. On their way a week was spent near Staple; on the last day of their stay there the battalion was inspected by the Duke of Connaught, who had last seen the unit on Parliament Hill in Ottawa during summer 1915. From Staple the 38th moved to Ypres by motor lorries and went into the front line on 28 October, attaching to the 12th Brigade on the morning of 30 October. The 38th's objective was the outlying defences of the town of Passchendaele, and this had been gained by the end of the day. They were relieved the night of 3 November, after suffering about 400 casualties.

On 5 November 1917, the 38th moved From Ypres to Lozinghem for a month's rest and in December again went into the line at Avion. A busy winter was spent in this area, the battalion holding various sectors of the front from Oppy in the south to Loos in the north. The week beginning 17 March 1918, was marked by five separate German raids on the 38th Battalion front in one week. However, not one enemy soldier was able to penetrate the front line. The raiding parties numbered 50 to 200 men each time. When the German offensive began on 21 March 1918, the 38th were holding the line at Hill 70 and remained there for one week. On 28 March the battalion (along with the rest of the 4th Division) was rushed four miles south to relieve a British division which had been pushed back nearly two miles that day. They remained in this vicinity until the middle of May when the Canadian Corps was withdrawn into GHQ Reserve, where time was spent learning the new kind of warfare which the German offensive had made necessary. The 38th went back into the line just north of Arras on 19 July, remaining there until 2 August.

The 38th assembled for an attack in the Gentelles Woods (east of Amiens) on the night of 7 August 1918. The first objective was Cayus Wood. This was held until the evening of 9 August, when a further advance was made to Rosières. On the morning of 11 August, a strong line had been consolidated in the vicinity of Chilli. The Germans launched a counterattack, which was repulsed. The fighting continued until the night of 13 August when the 38th was relieved after playing a prominent role in the advance of 22,000 yards by the Canadian Corps, resulting in the capture of 167 guns, 1,000 machine guns and 10,000 prisoners. Casualties were very heavy.

On 30 August the battalion took part in action east of Feuchy, and on 1 September relieved the 8th Canadian Battalion at Ostrich Trench. The Germans counterattacked and were repulsed; that night, the battalion assembled for an attack the following day on the Canal du Nord. By the late afternoon of 2 September, the battalion reached the summit of Drury Hill. In the evening the Germans made a determined counterattack, but the 38th held on and by the mid-afternoon of 3 September the position was consolidated. Here the 38th broke the Drocourt-Quéant Line, capturing 325 prisoners, 4 trench mortars and 40 machine guns. The battalion's casualties were 3 officers and 57 other ranks killed, 7 officers and 176 other ranks wounded and 57 missing, for a total of 300.

The 38th entrained at Arras on 25 September, reaching their assembly position for the attack on Cambrai the following day. The battalion was tasked with capturing the railway near Bourlon, and the attack began on the morning of 27 September. The battalion crossed the Canal at Inchy; at the outset the it captured 25 machine guns and 150 prisoners, but by noon there was stiff opposition. Before the day was over the 38th had captured a battery of 5.9 guns, a battery of 77-mm guns, 28 machine guns, 2 anti-tank guns and 200 prisoners. The battalion continued on 28 September to capture positions in Marcoing Trench. At this time Lieut. Col. Gardner, who was in command of the battalion, was killed. The task of the 38th now was to cross the Douai-Cambrai Road; on 29 September the battalion moved forward and that day nearly all the officers and NCOs of the battalion were killed or wounded. The losses may be appreciated by the fact that on 26 September the 38th went into the line 570 strong and came out on 30 September with 96. The battalion was relieved on the morning of 30 September, after having gained its objective on the Douai-Cambrai Road.

After the Battalion had been reinforced and reorganized, it returned to action on 22 October. Plans for the attack on Valenciennes were completed by 31 October, and on the morning of 1 November the 38th went into action for the last time. Although other units also took part in the operation, platoons of the 38th were the first to enter the city. By 3 November Valenciennes was secure; on 5 November the battalion was relieved and billeted in Anzin, and it was here that the battalion received notice of the Armistice on 11 November.

=== Summary ===
About 4,500 men passed through the battalion; casualties were approximately 700 killed and 2,000 wounded. Close to 300 decorations were awarded to members of the 38th Battalion, including two Victoria Crosses. "Red" Nunney was the only soldier in the Canadian Army to win the V.C., D.C.M., M.M. and the Croix de Guerre. The battalion returned to Halifax on 13 June 1919, and to Ottawa on 15 June.

The number 13 played a part in the history of the 38th. Some "13s" were:

- Landed in Bermuda 13 August 1915
- Landed in England 13 June 1916
- Landed in France 13 August 1916
- Relieved from Vimy 13 April 1917
- Relieved from Amiens 13 August 1918
- Landed at Halifax 13 June 1919

The train to Ottawa contained 13 cars.

== Organisation and colours ==
The battalion supported a brass band, whose battalion air was the medley of "Will Ye No Come Back Again", and "Ye'll Tak the High Road". The battalion colours, donated by the Ottawa Home Guard, were presented by Sir Joseph Pope on 1 August 1915, and deposited in Westminster Abbey on 12 July 1916. They were returned to Ottawa and deposited temporarily in Chalmers Church in 1919. Later, they were transferred to the Ottawa Regiment. The 38th Canadian Infantry Battalion is perpetuated by The Cameron Highlanders of Ottawa (Duke of Edinburgh's Own).

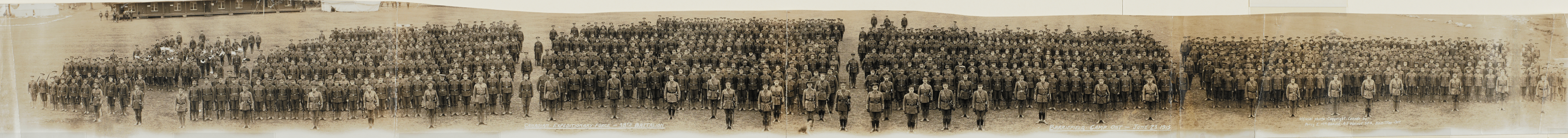
38th Battalion, Barriefield Camp (HS85-10-30559)

== Battle honours ==
- Somme, 1916
- Ancre Heights
- Ancre, 1916
- Arras, 1917 and 1918
- Vimy, 1917
- Ypres, 1917
- Passchendaele
- Amiens
- Scarpe, 1918
- Drocourt-Quéant
- Hindenburg Line
- Canal du Nord
- Valenciennes
- Sambre
- France and Flanders, 1916–18

== Officers ==
When the battalion left Canada, the officers were:

- Commanding Officer: Lieut. Col. C. M. Edwards
- Second-in-Command: Major C. Ferguson
- Adjutant: Capt. E. R. McNeill
- A Company: Capts. R. F. Parkinson, T. B. Byrne, Lts. R. B. Greene, W. B. McGloughlin, R. S. Stronach, E. C. H. Moore, T. H. Warren
- B Company: Capts. J. A. C. Macpherson, T. W. MacDowell, Lts. A. Rieffenstein, J. G. Wallace, L. L. Richard, K. A. Greene
- C Company: Capts. R. W. Stewart, W. A. Morrison, Lts. H. C. Graves, T. H. Hill, J. R. Morris, J. E. Muckle
- D Company: Capts. W. S. Wood, A. A. Sears, Lts. P. H. Gardner, G. S. MacFarlane, W. J. Wilby, R. F. Zeigler
- Quartermaster: Capt. E. A. Olver
- Paymaster: Capt. H. A. Folkins
- Chaplain: Capt. H. I. Horsey
- Medical Officer: Capt. J. H. Munro
- Machine Gun Officer: Lieut. G. G. Bell
- Signal Officer: Lieut. J. Glass

== Commanding Officers ==
Commanding Officers of the 38th were:

- Lieut. Col. R. Gorden Stewart
- Lieut. Col. C. M. Edwards
- Major R. F. Parkinson
- Lieut. Col. S. J. Gardner
- Lieut. Col. A. D. Cameron

== Victoria Crosses ==
- Maj. Thain Wendell MacDowell (Vimy Ridge)
- Pte. Claude Joseph Patrick Nunney (Drocourt-Quéant)

== See also ==
- List of infantry battalions in the Canadian Expeditionary Force
