= Prospect Camp, Bermuda =

Military installation manned by the Royal Garrison Artillery

Prospect Camp
- Devonshire Parish, Bermuda
- Presentation of colours at Prospect Camp recreation ground (now the Bermuda National Stadium)

Site information
- Type: Barracks
- Owner: Ministry of Defence
- Operator: British Army

Location
- Location in Bermuda
- Coordinates: 32.2994949°N 64.7653454°W

Site history
- Built: circa 1850
- In use: 1850s–1957

Garrison information
- Garrison: Bermuda Garrison

Prospect Camp, also referred to as Prospect Garrison, was the main infantry camp of the Bermuda Garrison, the military force stationed in the Imperial fortress of Bermuda. It also contained Fort Prospect, Fort Langton, and Fort Hamilton, as well as being the base for mobile artillery batteries, manned by the Royal Artillery (from 1899 to 1924, the Royal Garrison Artillery). Outlying parts of the camp were disposed of in the early decades of the Twentieth Century as the garrison in Bermuda was reduced. The core area, including the barracks, passed to the local government when the garrison was withdrawn in 1957.

== History ==
=== Military in Bermuda prior to the development of Prospect Camp ===
The Bermuda Garrison was built up from the 1790s onwards, paralleling the development of the Royal Navy facilities in Bermuda. Following US independence, which cost the Royal Navy all of its continental bases between the Maritimes and Florida (the latter of which would also pass to the United States), Bermuda, located 640 miles off Cape Hatteras, North Carolina, became very important to the Royal Navy, which began buying up tracts of land around the colony. Although the West End had been identified immediately as the ideal location for a dockyard and naval base, no passage through the encircling reefs large enough to allow ships-of-the-line to access the West End, the Great Sound, and Hamilton Harbour was then known. The navy spent a dozen years charting the reefs around Bermuda in search of a passage. Meanwhile, it concentrated its establishment in St. George's Harbour, buying land in and around St. George's Town. The regular army's Bermuda Garrison was built-up along with the naval establishment, both to defend Bermuda as a naval base, and to work with the navy in carrying out amphibious warfare on the Atlantic seaboard in any potential war with the United States, as demonstrated during the American War of 1812.

With most of the military fortifications built previously by the militia already clustered around the East End, as well, the British Army built up a large garrison, with headquarters and barracks, to the north of the town. Many forts, batteries and other smaller sites were scattered about Bermuda, but most of the army's manpower was in St. George's Garrison.

=== Development of the camp ===
By 1812, the navy was developing the new Royal Navy Dockyard at the West End, on Ireland Island. The new town of Hamilton, located in the central parishes, and to which the colony's capital moved from St. George's in 1815, was achieving increasing prominence as an Imperial fortress thanks to the same channel which allowed development of the dockyard. It became necessary to redeploy much of the military force in Bermuda westward, nearer to the new capital and the dockyard. Consequently, in the middle of the 19th century, the army purchased land on White Hill in Devonshire, and began the development of a large camp, with barracks to house the bulk of the infantry soldiers in Bermuda. Called Prospect Camp, it contained the headquarters of Bermuda's military garrison, barracks, parade grounds, training areas, and a fort. Prospect Fort was manned by the garrison units of the Royal Regiment of Artillery, later known as the Royal Garrison Artillery (this was one of three forts whose coastal artillery was intended to complement each other's with overlapping fire to guard the shores and the overland approaches to Hamilton, the others being Fort Hamilton and Fort Langton).

Although Prospect Camp had extensive areas for training, it was surrounded by public roads and residential areas, and had no safe area for a rifle range. Consequently, a second camp, Warwick Camp, was added primarily to provide rifle ranges to the soldiers of the garrison, and the dockyard's own Royal Marine detachment (and those of the ships stationed there). Warwick Camp had no units permanently assigned to it, however, with different units deploying there specifically for periods of training. Various other smaller sites were used by the Army over the history of the garrison. These included Watford Island and Boaz Island, both part of the Admiralty land holdings attached to the HM Dockyard, where Clarence Barracks had been erected to re-house convicts labourers (sent to Bermuda to take part in the construction of the Royal Naval Dockyard) previously accommodated on prison hulks. After the last convicts were removed from Bermuda in the 1860s, Boaz and Watford Islands were transferred to the army and housed a considerable number of soldiers (there being capacity for a battalion of infantry plus detachments from other corps). Bermuda was divided into three military districts, centred (from West to East) on Clarence Barracks, Prospect Camp, and St. George's Garrison, with overall Command Headquarters at Prospect Camp.

=== Use of the camp ===
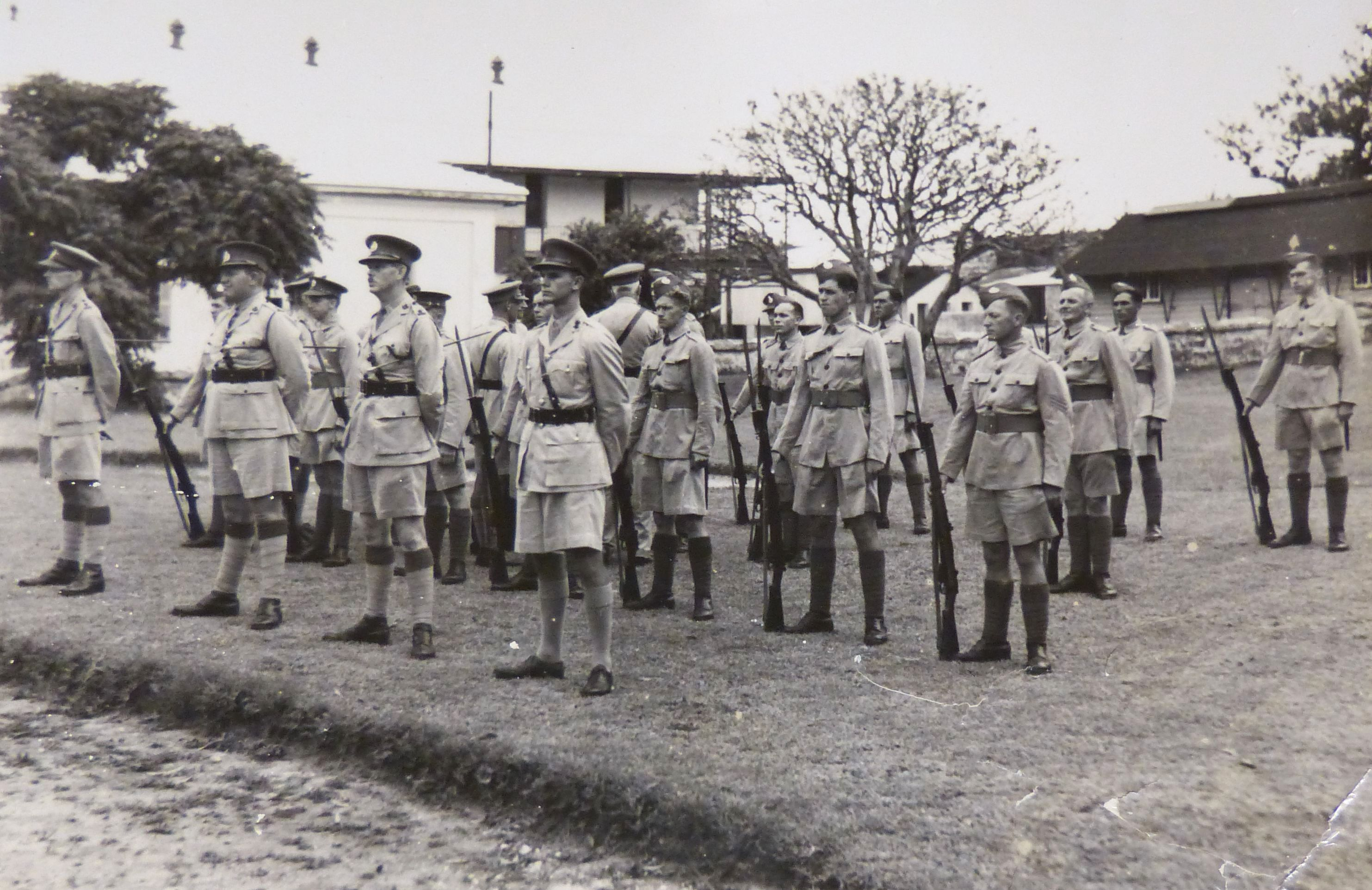
Governor and General Officer Commanding-in-Chief, Lieutenant-General Sir Denis Bernard, inspects the First Contingent of the Bermuda Volunteer Rifle Corps to the Lincolnshire Regiment at Prospect Camp on 22 June 1940.

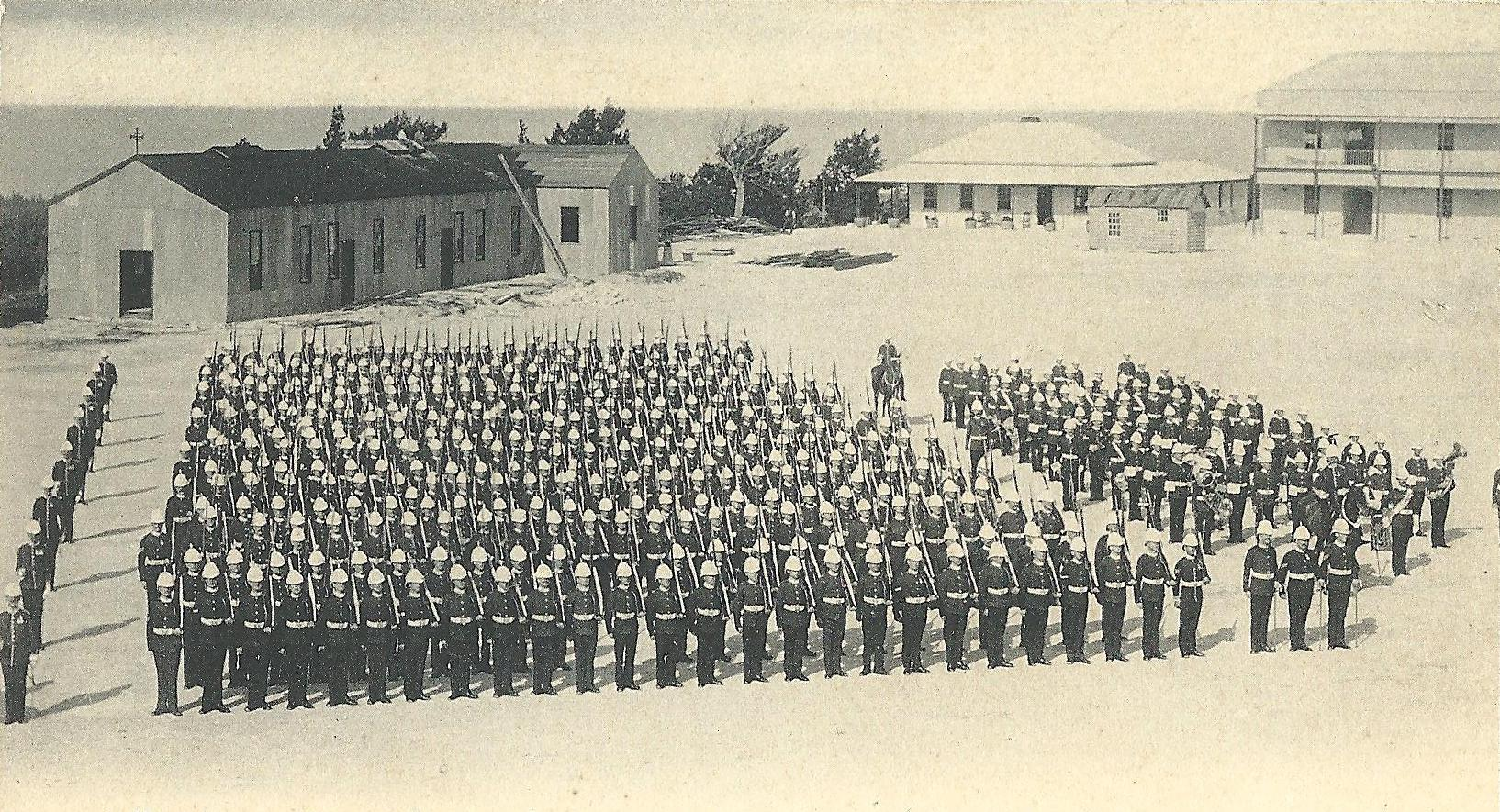
3rd Battalion of the Royal Warwickshire Regiment on parade at Prospect Camp, circa 1902.

Lieutenant-General Sir F.W. Kitchener with The Duke of Cornwall's Light Infantry in 1909

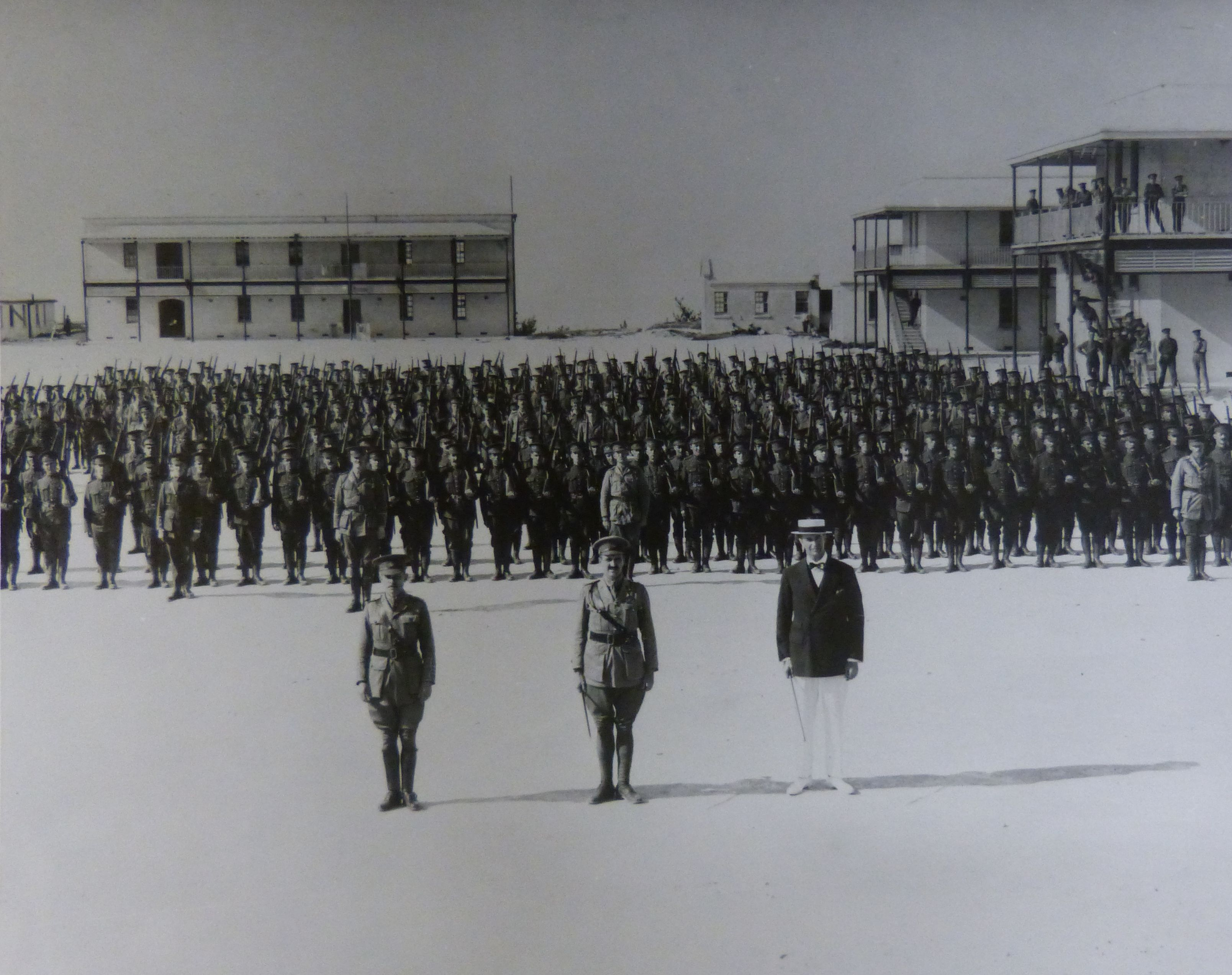
38th Battalion, CEF, at Prospect Camp, in 1915

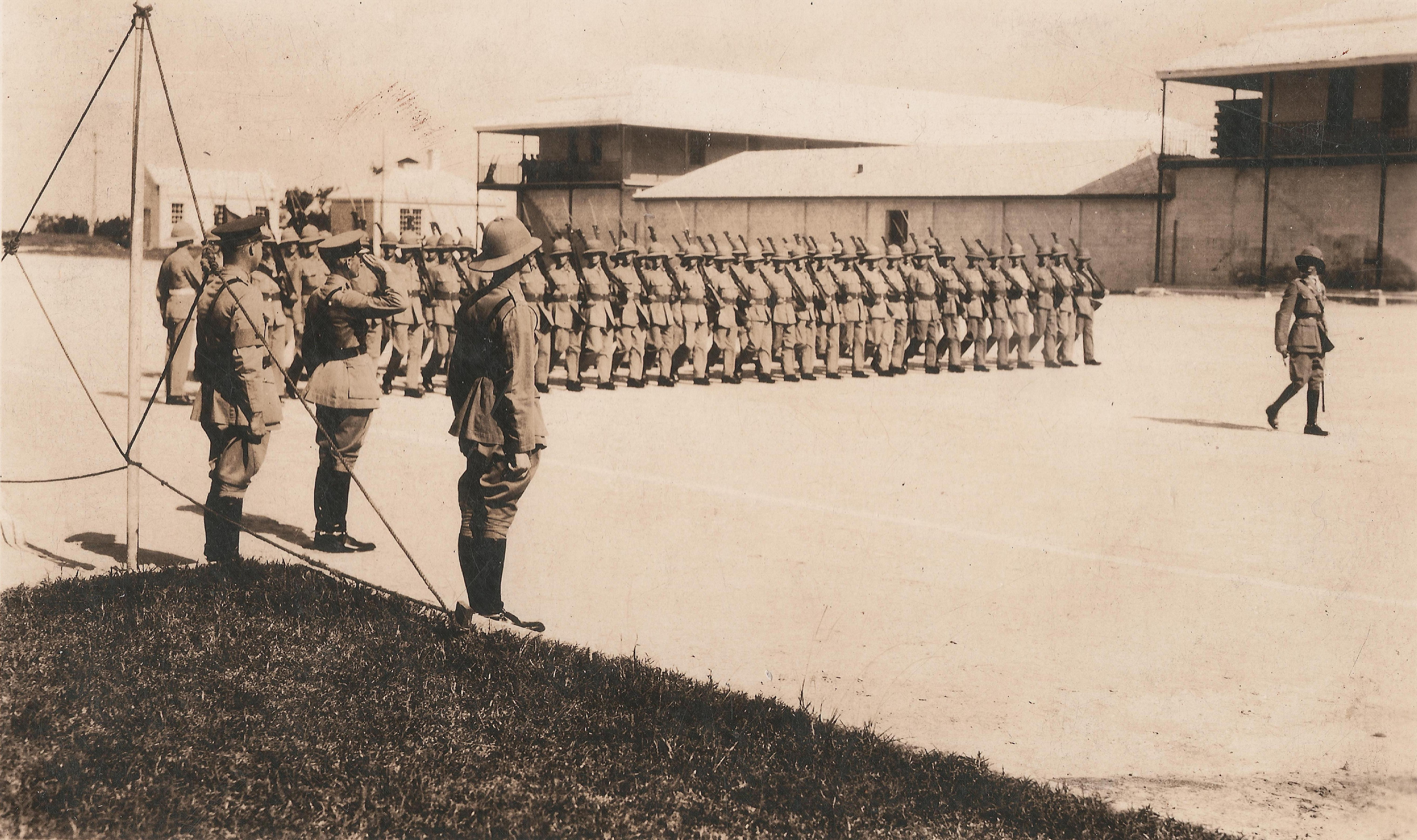
Governor of Bermuda Lieutenant-General Sir Louis Bols takes salute from the 1st Battalion, West Yorkshire Regiment (Prince of Wales's Own) at Prospect Camp in 1930

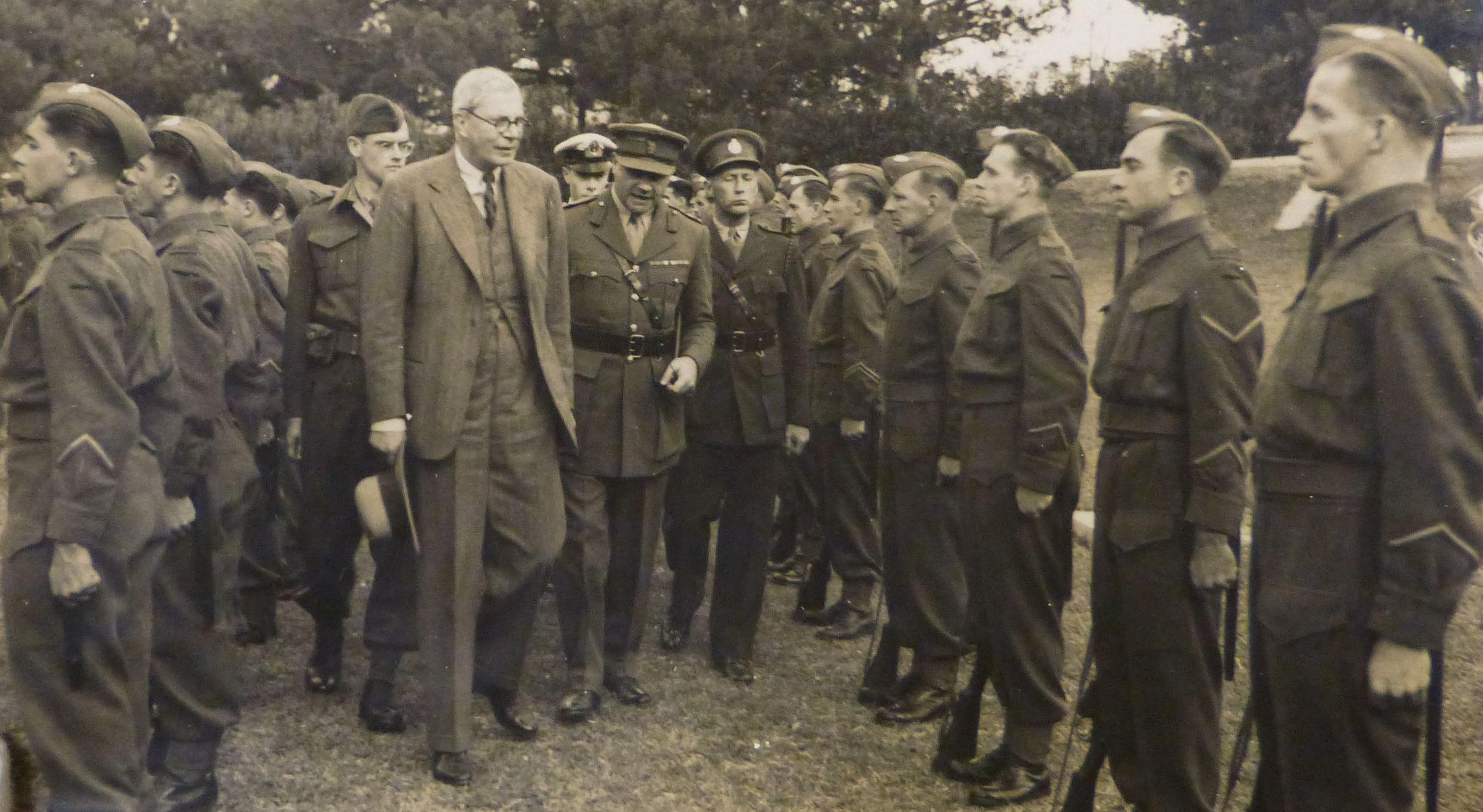
Secretary of State for the Colonies Oliver Stanley inspects the Bermuda Volunteer Rifle Corps at Prospect Camp, 30th December, 1944.

Through much of the 19th century, a full battalion of infantry soldiers was based in Bermuda, along with various artillery, engineer, and other support units. By the 1860s, financial constraints, the intention to redeploy more of the British Army in Britain to guard against invasion, and the intention to compose what would come to be known as the British Expeditionary Force (BEF), meant the garrison in Bermuda was scheduled for reduction. With Bermuda remaining an important naval base, however, the regular soldiers were obliged to remain in full strength for many years, until the government of Bermuda could be induced to raise part-time units, the Bermuda Militia Artillery and the Bermuda Volunteer Rifle Corps, to take on part of the responsibilities of the garrison. From then on, the regular soldiers in Bermuda were slowly whittled away. Between the two world wars, the regular Royal Artillery and Royal Engineers were withdrawn completely, handing their responsibilities entirely to the BMA and the Bermuda Volunteer Engineers. Although regular infantry soldiers remained, Bermuda no longer had a full garrison, and only a detached company was posted to Prospect Camp. As a new battalion deployed to Jamaica, it detached a company in Bermuda along the way.

During the Second World War, in addition to housing the headquarters and the regular infantry, the camp was also used for training overseas contingents from the part-time units (which had been embodied on a full-time basis for the duration of the war). The First Contingent of the BVRC, which left Bermuda to join the Lincolnshire Regiment in England, trained at Prospect Camp, along with several volunteers from the BMA and BVE who travelled with them to England, before detaching to join their larger corps. In 1943 Prospect Camp housed the Training Battalion, a temporary force composed of volunteers from the BVRC, the BMA and the Bermuda Militia Infantry, to train for deployment overseas. The battalion then split into two contingents; the Second Contingent of the BVRC which joined the Lincolnshire Regiment in Britain, and the Bermuda Militia contribution to the new Caribbean Regiment, for which it provided the Training Cadre, which was raised in North Carolina.

=== Withdrawal of garrison and closure of the camp ===
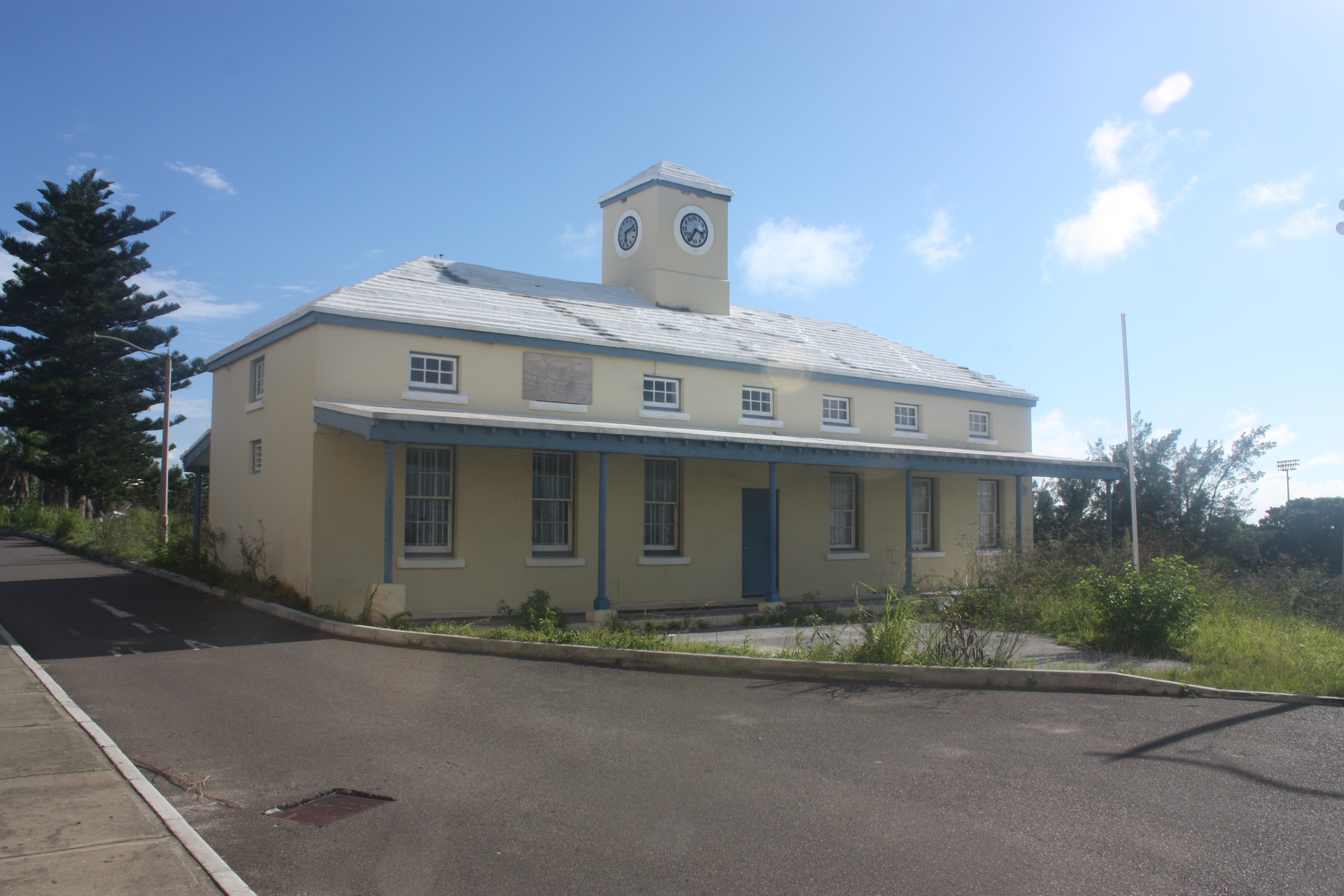
The Guard House at Prospect Camp, Devonshire, Bermuda in 2011

In 1951 it was announced that the Royal Navy's dockyard would be closed, a process that stretched throughout the 1950s, and left only a reduced resupply base, HMS Malabar, which operated until 1995. Without the dockyard, and with large naval and air bases of NATO ally, the USA, located in Bermuda, the military garrison became unnecessary. The last Imperial Defence Plan was issued in 1953. After that, the local part-time units ceased to have any role assigned by the War Office (or its successor, the Ministry of Defence). The last regular detachment, a company of the Duke of Cornwall's Light Infantry (DCLI), was withdrawn in 1957, following which Prospect Camp, along with most of the other military and admiralty properties in Bermuda, was transferred to the local government for £750,000.

=== Post-military usage ===
Following its transfer to the local government, Prospect Camp has been split between a number of government departments and private owners. The Bermuda Police Service has been the primary occupant, housing its headquarters, barracks, and various sub-units there. The Department of Education has also made considerable use of former camp grounds, having housed Prospect Secondary School in former barracks buildings, and having originally sited the campus of the Bermuda College there. In the 1990s, several barracks and other buildings were levelled, and the new Cedarbridge Academy was built in their place. The National Stadium also occupies part of the former military camp.
