= Régiment de Hull =

Le Régiment de Hull (RCAC)
- Active: 1914–present
- Country: Canada
- Branch: Primary Reserve
- Type: Armoured regiment
- Role: Armoured cavalry
- Size: One regiment
- Part of: Royal Canadian Armoured Corps
- Garrison/HQ: 188 Alexandre-Taché Boulevard, Gatineau, Quebec
- Motto: On ne passe pas (French for 'They shall not pass')
- Colors: Azure (royal blue), or and argent
- March: "La marche de la victoire"
- Anniversaries: Centennial, 7 August 2014
- Engagements: First World War; Second World War; War in Afghanistan
- Battle honours: Afghanistan

Commanders
- Current commander: Lieutenant-Colonel G.M.A. Blais, CD
- Current Regiment Sergeant Major: Chief Warrant Officer J. Larivière, CD
- Honorary Colonel: Colonel D. Lafleur, CD
- Notable commanders: BGen Dollard Ménard; Col Fernand Mousseau

Insignia
- NATO Map Symbol

Le Régiment de Hull (RCAC) is a Primary Reserve armoured cavalry regiment of the Canadian Army. The regiment is based in the Hull sector of Gatineau, Quebec, near Ottawa, Ontario. Active in all aspects of the day-to-day life of Outaouais residents, the unit is the only francophone military presence in the area.

== Regimental organization ==
Currently, the regiment is organised into two distinct squadrons: C/S Squadron (Commandement et Services) is made up of the logistical and administrative support staff as well as a holding platoon for new recruits and, D Squadron is the line squadron, to which most of the members of the unit belong.

== Lineage ==
=== Le Régiment de Hull (RCAC) ===
- Originated on 7 August 1914, in Hull, Quebec, as a City Corps Battalion of Infantry, with headquarters at Hull
- Designated on 15 October 1914, as the 70th Regiment
- Redesignated on 12 March 1920, as The Hull Regiment
- Redesignated on 1 March 1923, as Le Régiment de Hull
- Redesignated on 29 July 1941, as the 2nd (Reserve) Battalion, Le Régiment de Hull
- Redesignated on 18 September 1945, as Le Régiment de Hull
- Converted on 1 April 1946, to Armour and Redesignated as the 21st Armoured Regiment (Régiment de Hull), RCAC
- Redesignated on 4 February 1949, as Le Régiment de Hull (21st Armoured Regiment)
- Redesignated on 19 May 1958, as Le Régiment de Hull (RCAC)

=== Lineage chart ===
Lineage chart

1914	70th Regt
1916	230th "Overseas" Bn, CEF
1916	230th "Overseas" Canadian Forestry Bn, CEF
1917	Absorbed by Canadian Forestry Corps
1920	1st Bn (230th Bn, CEF), The Hull Regt
1923	1st Bn (230th Bn, CEF), Le Rég^{t} de Hull
1936	Le Rég^{t} de Hull
1941	1st Bn, Le Rég^{t} de Hull, CASF	2nd (Reserve) Bn, Le Rég^{t} de Hull
1944	4th Canadian Infy Training Bn, Type B (Le Rég^{t} de Hull), CASF
1945	Disbanded	Le Rég^{t} de Hull
1946	21st Armd Regt (Rég^{t} de Hull), RCAC
1949	Le Rég^{t} de Hull (21st Armd Regt)
1958	Le Rég^{t} de Hull (RCAC)

== Perpetuations ==
- 230th Battalion (Voltigeurs Canadiens-Français), CEF

== History ==
=== Foundation and the First World War ===
On 7 August 1914, a general order of the Canadian Militia authorized the formation of a unit at Hull. Three days earlier, Canada had entered the war against Germany; World War I had broken out. As was the custom of the day, the unit was designated by a number. The regiment's first official name was accordingly the "70^{e} Régiment (de Hull)". Initiatives to create a militia unit in Hull had nonetheless been under way since the spring of 1914 by a group of Hull citizens, including M.A. Allard, J.A. Cloutier, I. Landre, R. Déziel, J. Paré, J.A. Thibault, J. Gauvin and Lieutenant H. Heyendal. They met at the Collège Notre-Dame.

The creation of the Hull Regiment also coincided (on 7 August 1914) with the acceptance by Great Britain of the Canadian Government's offer to pay all the costs of a military contingent. This first contingent left for England on 3 October of that year. In Hull, as everywhere else in Canada, the public greeted the war with enthusiasm. Thousands wanted to leave for the front and to take part in what they believed would be a great adventure.

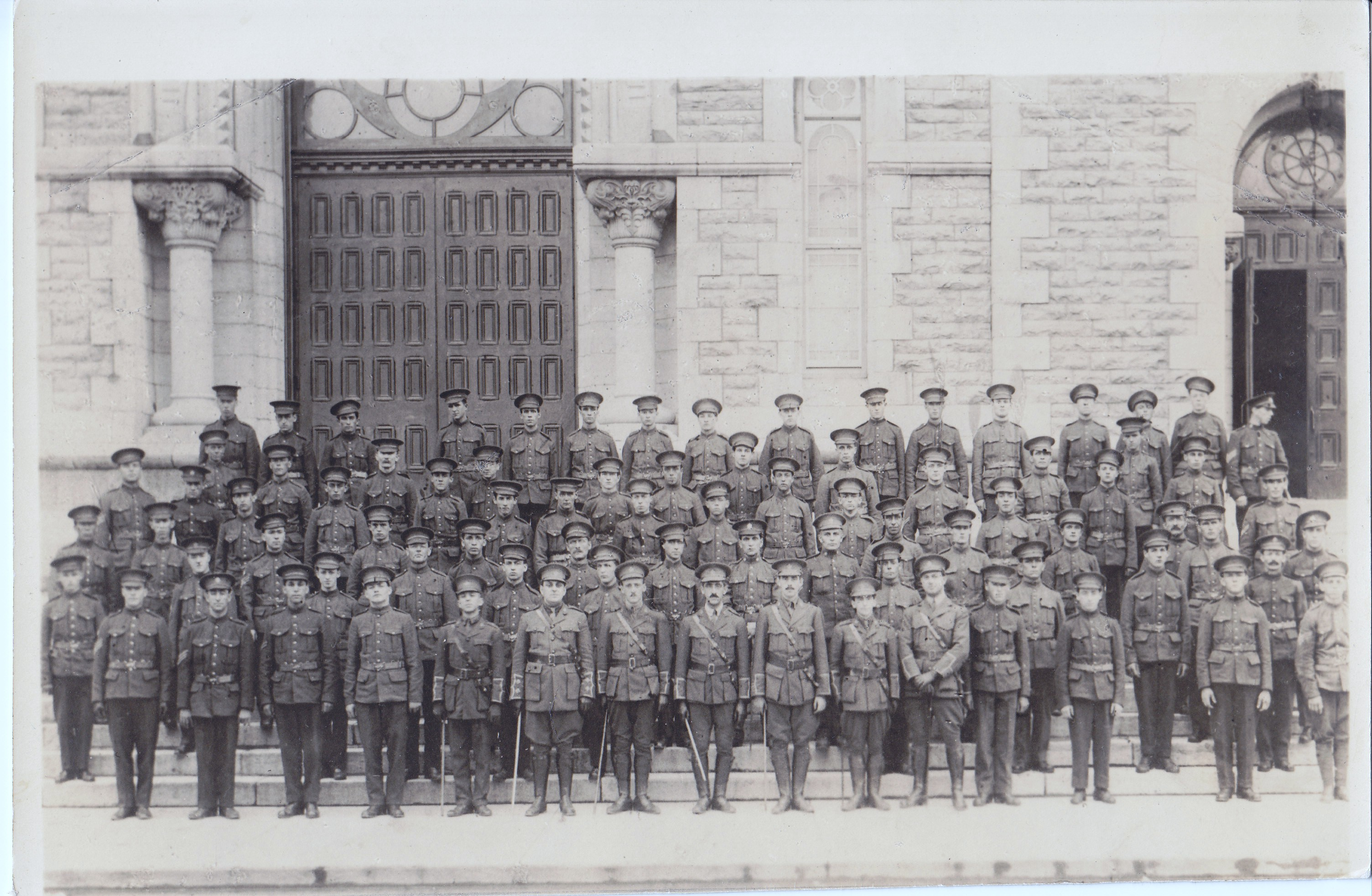
Officers, NCOs and men of Le Régiment de Hull (then known as "The Hull Regiment"), c. 1922

The first task of the 70th Regiment was to serve as a recruiting centre for the Hull military district. The regimental records show that the unit enrolled 2,108 men, who were subsequently distributed to a variety of battalions, including the 22nd, 38th, 41st and 57th. Although it was not mobilized for service overseas, the 70th Regiment provided personnel for the 230th Battalion (Voltigeurs Canadiens-Français), CEF. This unit of the Canadian expeditionary corps was formed almost entirely of members of the 70th Regiment recruited in the Outaouais. It is for this reason that Le Régiment de Hull perpetuates the memory of the 230th Battalion.

After a stay in England, the 230th was assigned to the Forestry Corps in November 1916 and went to France. This decision was made due to the high number of forestry workers from Hull, Quebec. The city of Hull was a booming city living off the lumber industry and most of the men enlisted from the 70th Regiment worked for various forestry companies, like E.B. Eddy. Before the war, England imported an enormous quantity of wood every year. And while the war had generated even greater demand, the cargoes needed were increasingly scarce as a result of German submarine attacks. This scarcity delayed the dispatch of reinforcements, ammunition, rations, fodder and other essential items. Canadians not only responded to the call, they set new production records. Over 70% of all the wood used by the allied armies during World War I came from Canada's forests. According to the official Canadian history, the participation of the Canadian Forestry Corps was "remarkable and contributed to the defeat of the submarine campaign".

=== Between the wars ===
The Armistice enabled some 350,000 members of the Canadian Expeditionary Force to return home. Over 60,000 Canadians had died in battle. Thousands more were seriously wounded and many of them would never be able to resume normal life. The return to civilian life after so terrible a war is often difficult for veterans. Similarly, the resumption of activities by the Hull Militia was not without its problems.

Since the government had decided no longer to designate units by a number, the 70th Regiment officially became "The Hull Regiment" in 1920, a designation which was changed to its French equivalent in Spring 1923. As was only to be expected after such a murderous war, enthusiasm waned significantly, a state of mind that was only exacerbated by equipment shortages and the need to meet in cramped, inadequate quarters. The regiment was housed at 84 Principale in Hull, moving to number 29 on the same street in 1922. Against all odds, the regiment grew and flourished and in 1938, the unit moved into its current headquarters: the Salaberry Armoury.

=== Second World War ===
==== Territorial defence (1939–1942) ====
When Canada declared war on Germany on 10 September 1939, the regiment did not expect to be mobilized for war. Detachments of the Regiment were assigned to mount guard at points considered vulnerable to saboteurs, specifically Rockcliffe Aerodrome and the Residence of the Governor General. Many members of the regiment enrolled in the active Army and initially served as instructors in numerous training camps, including in Saint Jérôme, Quebec and in Cornwall, Ontario.

The first Battalion of Le Régiment de Hull was mobilized for active service on 29 July 1941. A few days later, National Defence Headquarters entrusted command of the Regiment to Lieutenant-Colonel Marcel Grison. In the meantime, an initial group of officers had been sent to Brockville to undergo special training and the regiment left for Valcartier, where it underwent intensive training from December 1941 to mid-April 1942. It was subsequently sent to Nanaimo, British Columbia, where it participated in the defence of Canada as part of the 13th Canadian Infantry Brigade, 6th Canadian Infantry Division. This was the first time that a Francophone regiment had been stationed on Vancouver Island.

==== Operation Cottage (August 1943 - January 1944) ====
Invasion of Kiska

In August 1943, Le Régiment de Hull took part in the invasion of the island of Kiska, in the Aleutians. The Regiment was at the time under the command of Lieutenant-Colonel Dollard Ménard, DSO, CD a hero of the Dieppe raid. The Japanese had invaded the Aleutians in June 1942. Although Kiska was 4,500 km from Vancouver, the enemy presence caused considerable concern in Canada and the United States. While the U.S. Navy imposed a blockade, air raids were carried out. The blockade and the bombing nonetheless did not succeed in dislodging the enemy, and the Americans decided to attack the islands directly. On 12 May, US troops landed at Attu, resulting in one of the fiercest and most costly battles of the entire war. Of the 3,000 Japanese in the garrison, only 11 were taken prisoner; all the others were killed or committed suicide.

Since Kiska was defended by a stronger garrison (some 5,400 soldiers), the Americans asked Canada for help. The 13th Brigade was chosen to participate in the invasion of Kiska, comprising, in addition to Le Régiment de Hull, the Canadian Fusiliers, the Winnipeg Grenadiers and the Rocky Mountain Rangers. "D" Day for Kiska was set for August 15, 1943. Since the enemy had secretly abandoned the island, Canadian troops were not called upon to fight. The Regiment nonetheless had to stay on the island until January 1944, during which time the soldiers were subjected to the worst weather conditions endured by the Canadian Army anywhere, throughout its entire history.

==== Europe (1944–1946) ====
After being repatriated in February 1944, the Regiment embarked at Halifax for the United Kingdom on 25 May 1944. Its new barracks were at Camp Gandale in Yorkshire. The soldiers were expecting to take part in the eagerly awaited invasion of occupied Europe. Shortly after its arrival, however, the regiment was temporarily renamed the "4th Training Battalion" and assigned to training until their release on 18 September 1945. Many members of the 1st battalion of Le Régiment de Hull were nonetheless involved in fighting on the continent of Europe as reinforcements for other Canadian regiments, an honour for which some paid with their lives. During this time, a 2nd Battalion served in the Reserve Army. Members of the 2nd battalion contributed to the Army's recruiting efforts, guarded locations considered to be of strategic importance, took part in guarding prisoners of war and subscribed to numerous campaigns to sell Victory Bonds, in which they set records.

=== Postwar period and the Cold War (1946–1991) ===
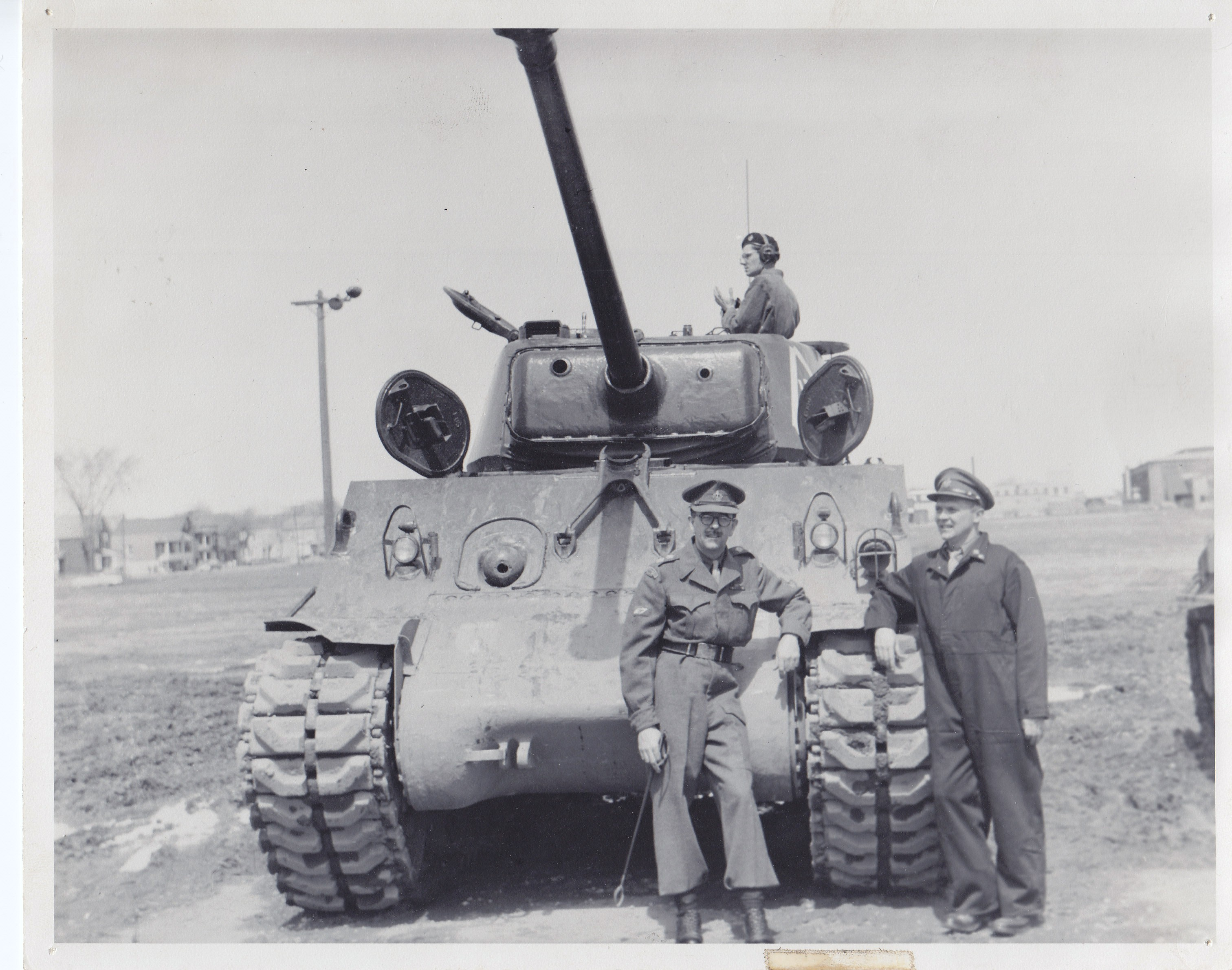
Sherman tanks, the Regiment's new fighting vehicle

After the Armistice, a new life began for the regiment. It was at this time that Le Régiment de Hull changed corps, moving from the infantry to armour. This new calling was officially confirmed on 1 April 1946, when the Regiment's name officially became the 21st Armoured Regiment (Le Régiment de Hull). Twelve years later, on 19 May 1958, the regiment adopted its current name: Le Régiment de Hull (RCAC). The Regiment should thenceforth have rallied around a cavalry guidon, but continued to serve under its old white regimental colours from infantry days, in the form of the flag it had received in 1924. During the years that followed the end of World War II, the Regiment took part in training exercises for a war in Europe against the Soviet Union. This was the start of the Cold War and relations between East and West were tense. It was against this background that, when Communist North Korea invaded South Korea, Canada agreed to send a contingent to be part of the UN Forces. More than 60 members of the regiment volunteered to serve in the 25th Canadian Infantry Brigade. At almost the same time, the Regiment formed the "Y" Troop to reinforce the armoured squadron of the 27th Canadian Infantry Brigade in Europe. This Brigade, the first Canadian force sent overseas in peacetime, was stationed near Hanover, in the Federal Republic of Germany.

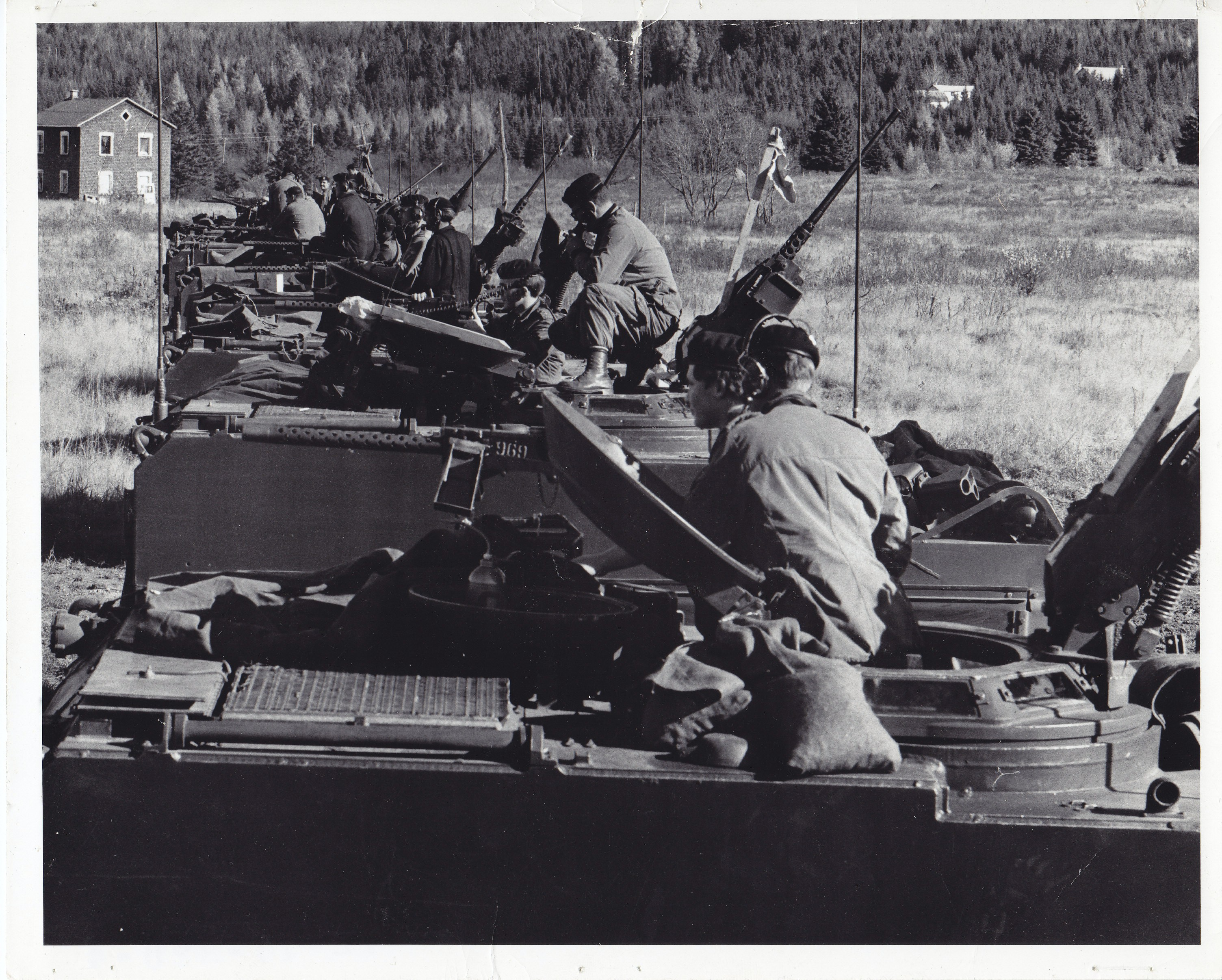
Reconnaissance troop on exercise, 1976

In the late 1950s, the role of the Militia changed; this was the era of civil defence. The members of the regiment took part in rescue exercises and emergency measures in the event of a nuclear war. The unit subsequently resumed its armoured training.

With the reorganisation of the Canadian Army into the Canadian Forces, several units were put onto the Supplementary Order of Battle. The National Capital Region's armoured reconnaissance unit IV Princess Louise's Dragoon Guards was transferred to the Supplementary Order of Battle, along with many other units. To compensate for the closure of the reconnaissance unit the Regiment's heavy armour role was gradually modified to that of a light armoured formation. The unit was equipped with machine-gun mounted jeeps for the purpose. This is why, since 1974, the regiment has acted as a reconnaissance unit in the Eastern Area, which has now become 2nd Canadian Division.

In 1979, the Regiment won the Worthington Trophy for the best Militia armoured unit. This was the crowning achievement after a series of trophies won in various military competitions, including the prestigious Buchanan Trophy, which is awarded to the best Quebec unit.

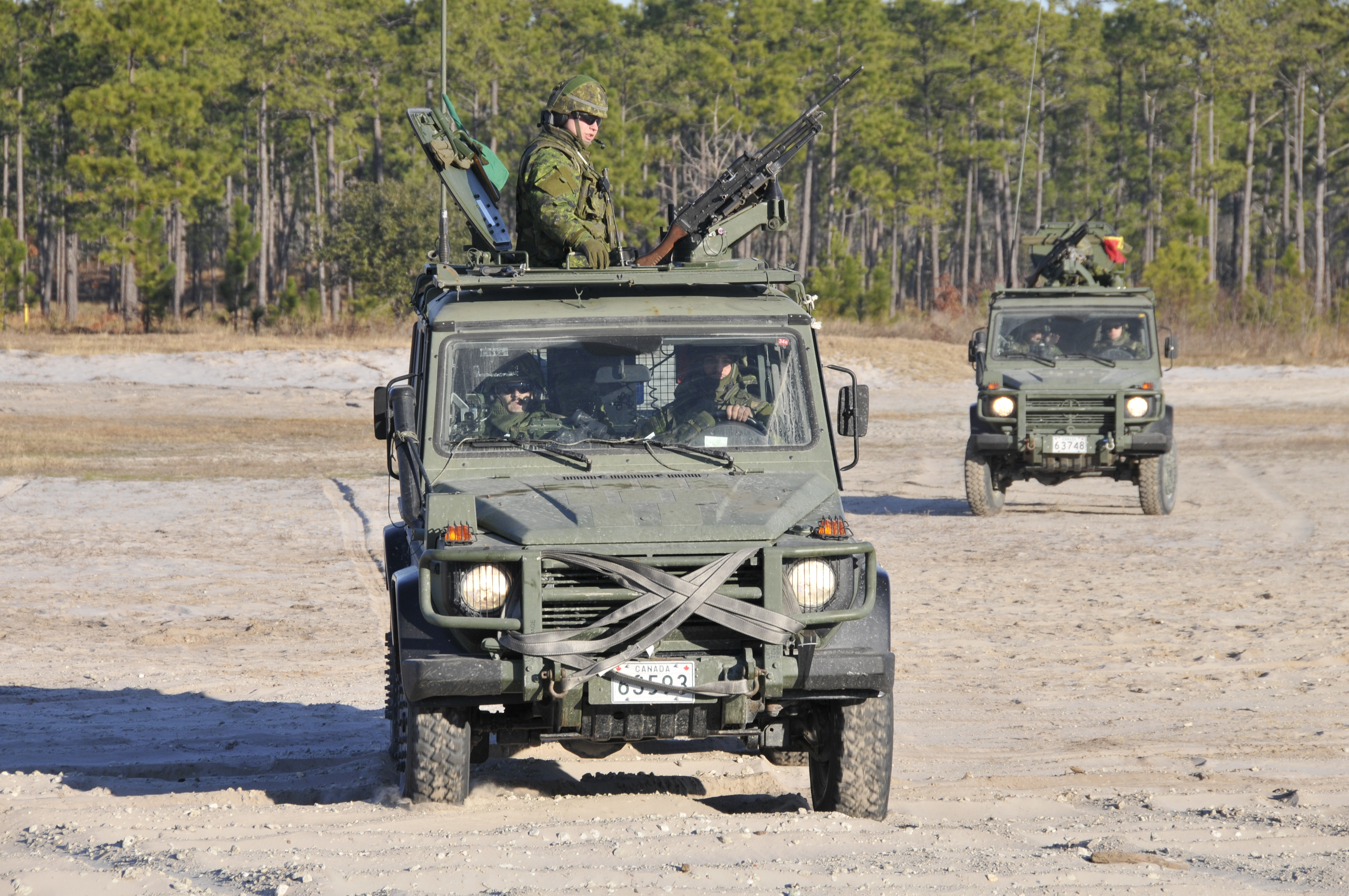
Reconnaissance patrol

=== Peacekeeping operations ===
Since 1948, Canada has taken part in many peacekeeping operations, either with the UN or other international organizations. Over 100,000 members of the Canadian Forces have served in these operations. As of January 1, 2000, 107 Canadian soldiers have died in the course of these missions. Canadian soldiers have developed an unusual degree of expertise and are now highly sought after for such missions. Members of Le Régiment de Hull are no exception to the rule: many of them have had an opportunity to participate in missions in Cyprus, Israel, Haiti and the former Yugoslavia. Members most recently served in the former Yugoslavia, Bosnia, Israel, Egypt, the Democratic Republic of Congo and Haiti. Alongside their colleagues in the Regular Force, the members of the regiment in 1988 shared the honour of receiving the Nobel Peace Prize, which was awarded to "blue helmets" throughout the world.

== Battle honours ==
Le Régiment de Hull was awarded its first battle honour on May 9, 2014, when it was announced that the regiment would receive the theatre honour AFGHANISTAN. The battle honour was presented to the unit on October 14, 2017, during a ceremony presided by the Lieutenant Governor of Quebec, J. Michel Doyon.

== Regimental colours and the first guidon ==
Like most infantry unit, the regiment followed the tradition of parading with their colours. In 1924, the Governor General, Baron Byng of Vimy, presented the unit with its regimental colour and royal colour, a gift from Honorary Lieutenant-Colonel J.E. Gravelle. This ceremony took place on the square in front of City Hall in Hull with thousands of onlookers. The colours were all white and fringed in gold, bearing the regiment's badge in gold and silver thread, with the tower against a pale blue background. The colours were unique in the Canadian military in that they were all white, as the unit had not yet spilled blood under its own banners. On October 16, 1982, the colours were paraded for the last time and laid to rest, displayed to the public at la Maison du Citoyen, in Hull, Quebec. On that same day, the Governor General, Edward Schreyer, presented the regiment with its first guidon. The new guidon is painstakingly embroidered on red damask and fringed in gold. The regiment's badge figures prominently and incorporates two rams, recalling the unit's service in the infantry, and two fleurs-de-lys, symbolizing its francophone status.

Flags of Le Régiment de Hull (RCAC)

Regimental Colours, 1924–1982

Regimental Guidon, 1982–present day

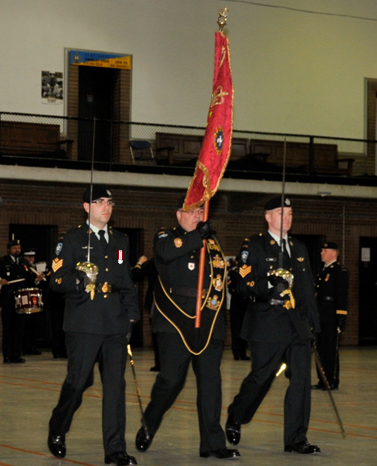
The Guidon on parade with escorts

Camp flag of the regiment

== Traditions and customs ==
=== Motto ===
Upon being stood up, the regiment was initially authorized to use the motto non retrorsum, which is Latin for "We will not retreat". This motto was used until 1923, when the unit's name was changed to Le Régiment de Hull. On ne passe pas, French for "They shall not pass" appears to have been inspired by the words of General Robert Nivelle at the Battle of Verdun in 1916. During a staff meeting, he spat "On ne passe pas!" when speaking of the German forces seeking to take Verdun.

=== Official drink ===
The official drink of Le Régiment de Hull is Calvados. This traditions comes from members of the regiment who returned from the war after serving as reinforcements to the Régiment de Maisonneuve, Régiment de la Chaudière and Le Fusiliers Mont-Royal during the Normandy Campaign of 1944. The drink was offered (and sometimes "liberated") to Canadian soldiers while passing through Normandy and the drink became popular with the troops.

=== March ===
The unit's official March is "La Marche de la Victoire" (French: The March of Victory). It was composed during the Second World War by Joseph Beaulieu, a musical composer with close ties to the regiment's band at the time. The Regiment does not have a slow march.

== Trophies ==
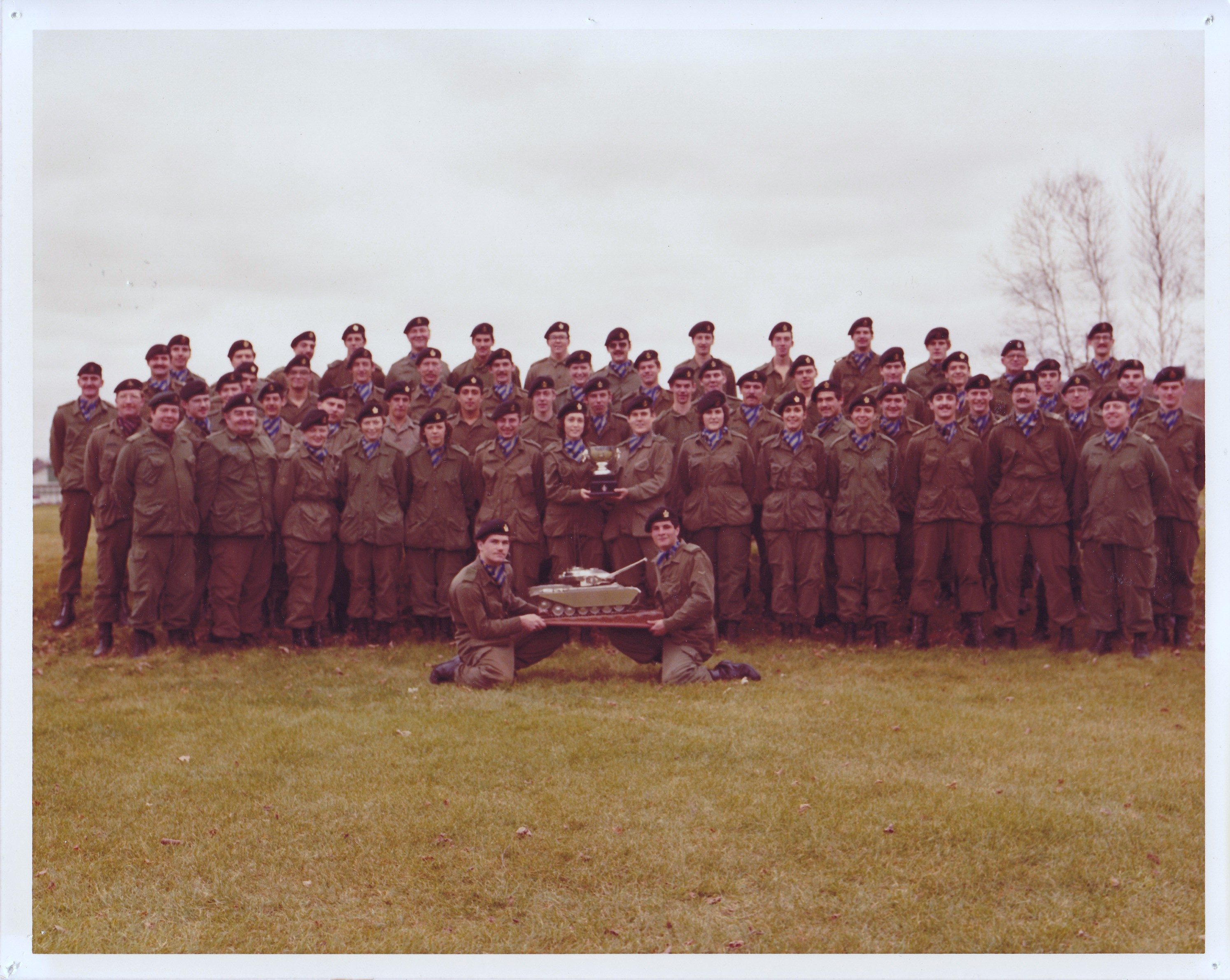
Worthington Trophy, 1979

Over the course of its history, the Régiment de Hull has won the following trophies:

Worthington Trophy
Won in 1979.
First presented in 1954 by the first Commanding Officer of the Armoured Corps, MGen F.F. Worthington. The trophy is a scale model in silver of a Centurion tank. The trophy is awarded to the best Armoured Corps Militia unit.
Nash Memorial Challenge Trophy
Won in 1988, 1989.
The Nash trophy was first awarded in 1939 by MGen Nash, MC, ADC. The trophy was initially awarded to the Armoured Corps Militia unit with the highest percentage of qualified mechanics in its ranks. Since 1980, the trophy has been awarded to the best reconnaissance troop in the Armoured Corps Militia units.
Buchanan Trophy
Won in 1957, 1964, 1978, 1979, 1980.
Awarded for the first time in 1957 by LCol E.B.Q. Buchanan. This trophy is given to the best Militia armoured unit in Quebec and the Atlantic provinces.
Colonel Ross Memorial Trophy
Won in 1975, 1976, 1977, 1981, 1984.
Awarded in honour of Colonel Ross in 1953. The trophy rewards the second best armoured unit in Quebec and the Atlantic provinces.

== Salaberry Armoury ==
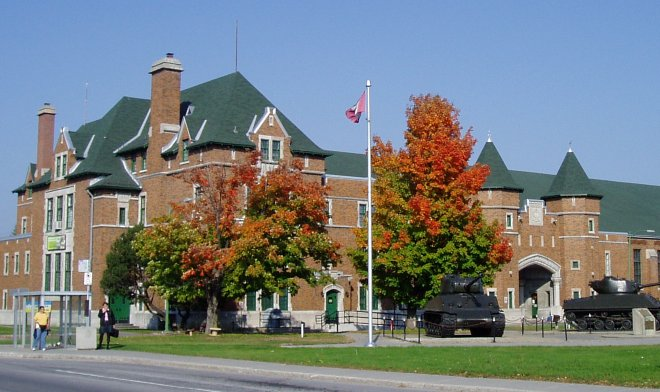
Salaberry Armoury

As early as 1923, the Commanding Officer Lieutenant-Colonel Rodolphe Girard, had dreamed of a proper armoury. This was to be a lengthy undertaking requiring the devotion of successive Commanding Officers. Finally, thanks to the perseverance of Régiment de Hull Commanding Officers and to the combined efforts of the civilian, religious, political and military authorities of the day, the first subsidies for what was to become the Salaberry Armoury were voted by Parliament on 18 February 1937, in large measure due to the efforts of the MP for Hull, Alphonses Fournier, QC. The Salaberry Armoury stands at the intersection of Taché and Saint-Joseph Boulevards, on an enormous lot donated by Lieutenant-Colonel W. F. Hadley, VD, the Commanding Officer of Le Régiment de Hull from 1927 to 1931. Since then, almost half the land along Saint-Joseph Blvd has been converted into a park.

The laying of the cornerstone and christening of the new armoury took place on July 21, 1938. The plans had been drawn by a local architect, Lucien Sarra-Bournet, presumably based upon the 2-year-old plans for the Seaforth Armoury. Six months later, on 28 January 1939, less than a year before the declaration of hostilities with the Third Reich, His Excellency Lord Tweedsmuir, presided over the official opening of Salaberry Armoury.

Sixty years on, these two armouries remains some of Canada's most impressive military buildings. The Salaberry Armoury was named in honour of Colonel Charles Michel de Salaberry, celebrated as "the saviour of our country" following his victory at Châteauguay, one of the most important battles of the War of 1812.

== Senior appointments ==
=== Commanding officers ===
- 1914–20 LCol. W.L. (Wilfred) Allard
- 1916–18 LCol R. (René) de Salaberry (Officer Commanding the 230th Battalion (Voltigeurs Canadiens-Français), CEF)
- 1920–23 LCol J.A. (Joseph Alphonse) Cloutier
- 1923–27 LCol R. (Rodrigue) Girard
- 1927–31 LCol W.F. (William Fraser) Hadley, VD
- 1931–35 LCol F.J.G. (Gérard) Garneau, OBE, ED
- 1935–39 LCol R. (Rodolphe) Larose, ED
- 1939–43 LCol M.C. (Marcel) Grison, ED, ADC
- 1941–42 LCol L. (Antonio Léopold) Normandin (Commanding Officer of the 2nd Battalion, Le Régiment de Hull)
- 1942–43 BGen M.A. (Marc) Lavoie, ED (Commanding Officer of the 2nd Battalion, Le Régiment de Hull)
- 1943–44 Bgen (Dollard) Ménard, DSO, CD
- 1944–46 LCol L.J. (Lucien) Saint-Laurent, OBE
- 1946–48 LCol J.P. (Jean-Paul) Carrière, CD
- 1948–52 Col F. (Fernand) Mousseau, CD
- 1952–56 LCol C. (Conrad) Legault, CD
- 1956–59 LCol G. (George) Addy, ED, CD
- 1959–64 LCol M.G.G. (Guy) de Merlis, CD
- 1964–67 LCol A. (Alfred) Fortier, ED, CD
- 1967–70 LCol H.A. (Henri) Langlois, CD
- 1970–73 LCol J. (Jacques) Dargis, CD
- 1973–76 LCol R.E. (Robert) Dormer, CD, ADC
- 1976–79 LCol J.R.L. (Lucien) Villeneveuve, CD
- 1979–83 BGen J. (Jean) Gervais, CD
- 1983–87 LCol R.L. (Réal) Adam, CD
- 1987–90 LCol L. (Léo) Marleau, CD
- 1990–93 LCol D. (Daniel) Gagné, CD
- 1993–96 Col D. (Daniel) Lafleur, CD
- 1996–99 LCol Y. (Yves) Isabelle, CD
- 1999–02 LCol L. (Luc) Lefebvre, CD, ADC
- 2002–05 Col J.L.P. (John) Giguère, CD
- 2005–08 LCol M.P. (Michel) Gagné, CD
- 2008–11 LCol A.E.T. (Thomas) Falardeau, CD
- 2011–14 LCol A. (André) LaFrance, CD
- 2014–17 LCol J.T.M. (Marcel) Duguay, CD
- 2017–19 LCol L.P. (Louis-Philippe) Binette, CD
- 2019–22 LCol M.J. (Michael) Bisson, CD
- 2022–24 Lcol G.M.A. (Marc-André) Blais, CD
- 2024–present Lcol J. (Julien) Chaput-Lemay, CD

=== Regimental sergeant majors ===
- 1914–21 WO1 W. (William) Paquette
- 1921–31 WO1 L.G. (Louis-Georges) Séguin
- 1931–42 WO1 M. (Maurice) Doran
- 1943–45 WO1 A. Handy
- 1942–52 WO1 G. (George) Doran (RSM for the 2nd Battalion, Le Régiment de Hull)
- 1953–59 WO1 E. (Emmanuel) Blakeney
- 1959–66 WO1 R. (Roland) Nault, CD
- 1966–67 WO1 F. (Fred) Gordon, EM, CD
- 1967–71 CWO J. (Jacques) Labelle, CD
- 1971–73 CWO P.P. (Pierre-Paul) Séguin, CD
- 1973–76 CWO Y. (Yvon) Chénier, CD
- 1976–77 CWO P. (Pierre) Monette, CD
- 1977–84 CWO J.A. (Arthur) Barratt, CD
- 1984–85 CWO A.E. Allard, CD
- 1985–88 CWO G. (Gilles) Sabourin, CD
- 1988–89 CWO N. (Normand) Bouvier, CD
- 1990–93 CWO R. (Raymond) Lessard, CD
- 1993–98 CWO R. (Réginald) Guilbert, CD
- 1999–99 CWO N. (Normand) Roberge, MMM, CD (acting)
- 1999–03 CWO D. (Denis) Morin, CD
- 2003–08 CWO R. (René) Riopel, MMM, CD
- 2008–11 CWO G.H (Gilles) Bergeron, CD
- 2011–13 CWO J.R.R. (Réjean) Picotin, CD (acting)
- 2013–19 CWO J.D. (Daniel) Heppell, CD
- 2019–20 CWO A.G.J. (André) Tremblay, CD (acting)
- 2020–23 CWO M. (Michel) Boivin, CD
- 2023–24 CWO J. (Janique) Larivière, CD
- 2024- présent MWO J.S.N. (Stéphane) Langlois, CD

== See also ==
- Salaberry Armoury
- 34 Canadian Brigade Group
- List of units of the Canadian Army
- Authorized marches of the Canadian Forces
- 2nd Canadian Division
- Canadian Forces order of precedence

== Order of precedence ==
Preceded by The Fort Garry Horse	Le Régiment de Hull (RCAC)	Succeeded by The Windsor Regiment (RCAC)
