= Carabiniers Mont-Royal =

Carabiniers Mont-Royal may refer to

- 150th Battalion (Carabiniers Mont-Royal), CEF - part of the Canadian Expeditionary Force during the First World War
- 65th Regiment, Les Fusiliers Mont-Royal, a Primary Reserve infantry regiment of the Canadian Army
