= Régiment de Maisonneuve =

Canadian military unit

Le Régiment de Maisonneuve
- Regimental cap badge
- Active: 1880–present
- Country: Canada
- Branch: Primary Reserves
- Type: Line infantry
- Role: Light role
- Size: One battalion
- Part of: 34 Canadian Brigade Group
- Garrison/HQ: 691 Cathcart Street, Montreal, Quebec
- Mottos: Bon cœur et bon bras (French for 'good heart and strong arm')
- March: "Sambre et Meuse"
- Engagements: First World War; Second World War; War in Afghanistan
- Battle honours: See § Battle honours
- Website: www.canada.ca/en/army/corporate/2-canadian-division/le-regiment-de-maisonneuve.html

Le Régiment de Maisonneuve is a Primary Reserve infantry regiment of the Canadian Forces. The regiment is Canada's twenty-sixth most senior reserve infantry regiment, and comprises one battalion serving as part of 34 Canadian Brigade Group. The unit was formed in 1880 as the 85th Battalion of the Non-Permanent Active Militia, and was renamed in 1920 in honour of Paul de Chomedey, Sieur de Maisonneuve, the founder of Montreal. The regiment's 1st Battalion fought in northwest Europe during the Second World War.

== Lineage ==
This Reserve Force regiment originated in Montreal, Quebec, on 4 June 1880, when the 85th Battalion of Infantry was authorized to be formed. Lieutenant-Colonel Julien Brosseau, VD, was the first Commanding Officer. It was redesignated as the 85th Regiment on 8 May 1900, as Le Régiment de Maisonneuve on 29 March 1920, as the 2nd (Reserve) Battalion, Le Régiment de Maisonneuve on 7 November 1940 and finally Le Régiment de Maisonneuve on 15 December 1945.

=== Lineage chart ===
Lineage chart

1869
1880
1900
1914	41st Bn, CEF
1916
1916	Absorbed by 69th "Overseas" Bn
1920
1922
1936
1939	Le Rég^{t} de Maisonneuve, CASF
1940	1st Bn, Le Rég^{t} de Maisonneuve, CASF
1942
1943
1945	Disbanded
1961

Independent infy coys
85th Bn of Infy
85th Regt
206th "Overseas" Bn, CEF
Absorbed by 167th "Overseas" Bn
1st Bn, Le Rég^{t} de Maisonneuve	2nd Bn, (Note: Reserve) Le Rég^{t} de Maisonneuve
1st Bn (206th Bn, CEF), Le Rég^{t} de Maisonneuve
Le Rég^{t} de Maisonneuve	Disbanded
2nd (Reserve) Bn, Le Rég^{t} de Maisonneuve
3rd Bn, Le Rég^{t} de Maisonneuve, CASF
Disbanded
Le Rég^{t} de Maisonneuve
Perpetuates 41st Bn

== History ==
=== Great War ===
During the Great War, details of the 85th Regiment were placed on active service on 6 August 1914 for local protection duties. The 41st Battalion, CEF, was authorized on 7 November 1914 and embarked for Great Britain on 18 October 1915, where it provided reinforcements to the Canadian Corps in the field until 13 July 1916, when its personnel were absorbed by the 69th Battalion, CEF. The battalion was disbanded on 15 September 1920. The 206th Battalion, CEF, was authorized on 15 July 1916 and sent two reinforcing drafts to Bermuda. On 17 August 1916, its remaining personnel were absorbed, in Canada, by the 167th Battalion, CEF. The battalion was disbanded on 1 August 1918.

In 1920, as part of the Otter Committee's reforms, the 85th Infantry Regiment was restructured and renamed the Régiment de Maisonneuve, in memory of the founder of Montreal, Paul Chomedey de Maisonneuve.

=== Second World War ===
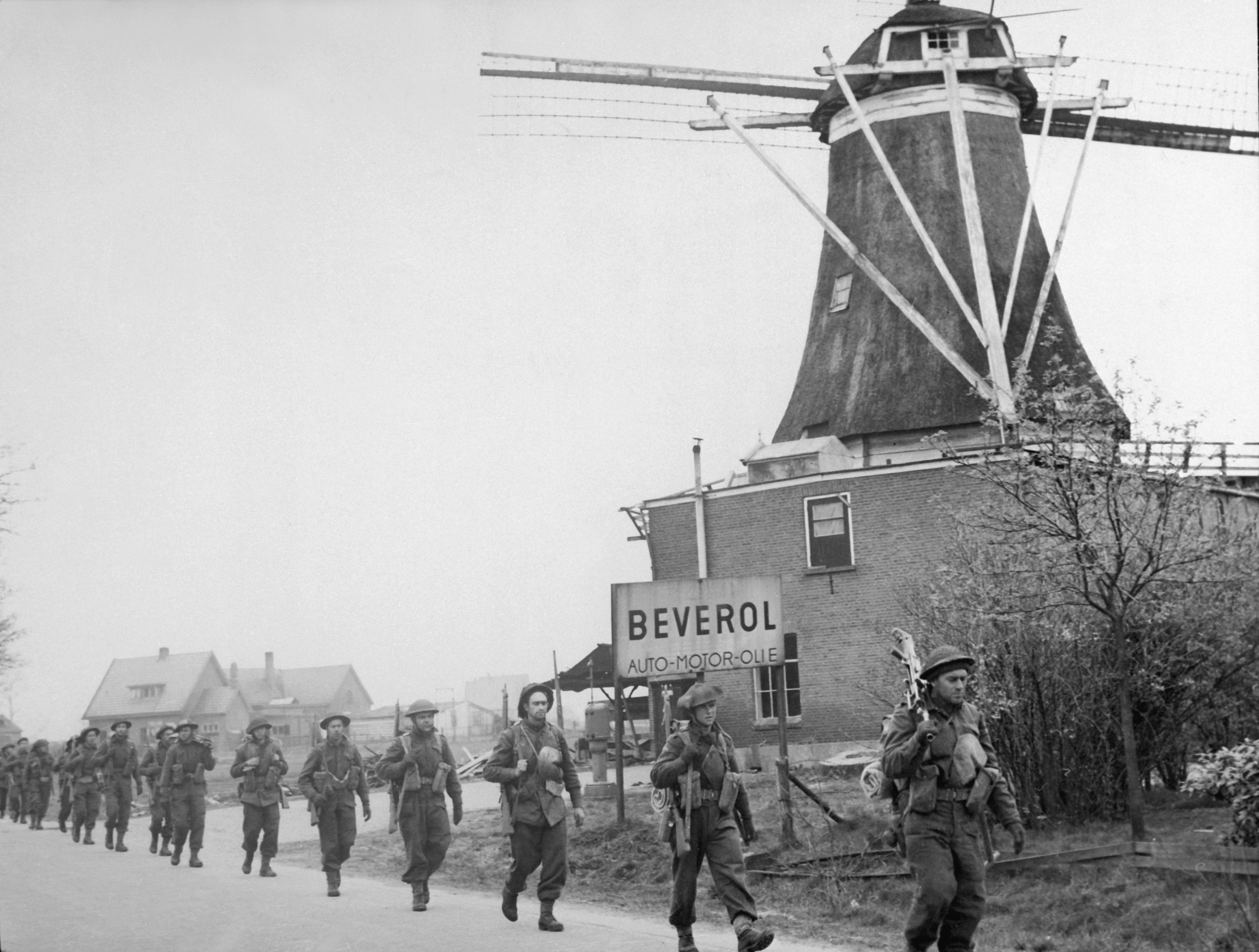
Members of the 1st Battalion moving through Holten to Rijssen, Netherlands, 9 April 1945

The regiment mobilized Le Régiment de Maisonneuve, CASF, on 1 September 1939. It embarked for Great Britain on 24 August 1940. It was redesignated as the 1st Battalion, Le Régiment de Maisonneuve, CASF, on 7 November 1940. The regiment subsequently mobilized the 3rd Battalion, Le Régiment de Maisonneuve, CASF, on 12 May 1942. It served in Canada in a home defence role as part of the 21st Infantry Brigade, 8th Canadian Division. The 3rd Battalion was disbanded on 15 October 1943.

On 7 July 1944, the 1st Battalion landed in France as part of the 5th Infantry Brigade, 2nd Canadian Infantry Division. It suffered heavy casualties in the Battle of the Scheldt, and was notably depleted by the time of the Battle of Walcheren Causeway. The unit recovered during the winter and was again in action during the Rhineland fighting and the final weeks of the war, taking part in the final campaigns in northern Netherlands, the Battle of Groningen, and the final attacks on German soil. The overseas battalion was disbanded on 15 December 1945.

=== Postwar ===
In 1940 the regiment formed an alliance with the King's Shropshire Light Infantry, headquartered in Shrewsbury, England.

In 1962 the city of Montreal accorded the regiment Freedom of the City as well as the right to bear the coat of arms of Montreal on its regimental colour.

The unit celebrated its centennial in 1980 and published a history. In 1983, the unit moved from District Number 1 to District Number 2 in Quebec. On 1 September 1991, the regiment transferred to the new district Number 1.

1994: The regiment was affiliated in July to HMCS Montréal (FFH 336), a new frigate of the Canadian Navy. 1997: The regiment was consolidated under the restructuring of 34 Canadian Brigade Group.

== Alliances ==
- United Kingdom: The Rifles
- Royal Canadian Navy: HMCS Montréal

== Battle honours ==
In the list below, battle honours in capitals were awarded for participation in large operations and campaigns, while those in lowercase indicate honours granted for more specific battles. Battle honours in bold type are authorized to be emblazoned on regimental colours.

Regimental colour, featuring the flag of Montreal, "M" for the Sieur de Maisonneuve, "85" for 85th Regiment Canadian Militia, and "41" for 41st Battalion CEF

The Great War

- **MOUNT SORREL**
- **SOMME, 1916**
- **ARRAS, 1917**
- **HILL 70**
- **YPRES, 1917**
- **AMIENS**

The Second World War

- BOURGUÉBUS RIDGE
- **Faubourg de Vaucelles**
- Maltot
- Verrières Ridge–Tilly-la-Campagne
- **FALAISE**
- Falaise Road
- **Forêt de la Londe**
- Dunkirk, 1944
- **Antwerp–Turnhout Canal**
- THE SCHELDT
- Woensdrecht
- South Beveland
- **Walcheren Causeway**
- THE RHINELAND
- **The Reichswald**
- **The Hochwald**
- **Xanten**
- **Groningen**
- Oldenburg
- **NORTH-WEST EUROPE, 1944–1945**

War in Afghanistan

- **AFGHANISTAN**

== Armoury ==
Site	Date(s)	Designated	Description	Image
Victoria Rifles Armoury, 691 Cathcart Street, Montreal	1933	Canada's Register of Historic Places; Recognized - 1984 Register of the Government of Canada Heritage Buildings	This armoury`s two-dimensional façade with a low-pitched gable roof is pressed up against its urban streetscape	

== See also ==
- Military history of Canada
- History of the Canadian Army
- Canadian Forces
- List of armouries in Canada

== Media ==
- Le Régiment de Maisonneuve vers la victoire 1944-1945 by Gérard Marchand (Apr 22 1997)
- Bon coeur et Bon bras, Histoire du Régiment de Maisonneuve 1880-1980 by Jacques Gouin (1980)
- Le Régiment de Maisonneuve, Le régiment officiel de la Ville de Montréal 1880-2017 by Michel L’Italien (2018)

== Notes ==
Preceded by The Nova Scotia Highlanders	Le Régiment de Maisonneuve	Succeeded by The Cameron Highlanders of Ottawa (Duke of Edinburgh's Own)
