= Fernand Mousseau =

Fernand Mousseau CD
- Major Mousseau in 1944
- Born: November 10, 1920
- Died: April 26, 2010 (aged 89); Gatineau, Quebec
- Military career
- Allegiance: Canada
- Branch: Canadian Army
- Service years: 1940-1952
- Rank: Lieutenant Colonel
- Units: Le Régiment de Hull; Les Fusiliers Mont-Royal
- Commands: Le Régiment de Hull (RCAC)
- Conflicts: Second World War
- Awards: Canadian Forces' Decoration; Legion of Honour

Lieutenant-colonel Fernand Mousseau, CD was an officer of the Canadian Army made famous in military circles for his participation in the liberation of Paris. During the Allied invasion of Normandy, Mousseau was one of the few Canadians to participate in the liberation of Paris in August 1944. He was also a prominent businessman in his community and a notable civil servant. Mousseau was awarded the French Legion of Honour in 2006 for his involvement in the liberation of Paris.

== Military career ==
While studying at the University of Ottawa, Fernand Mousseau, from Hull enrolled in the Officer Training Corps in 1940 and was transferred to Le Régiment de Hull. He was promoted to Lieutenant at the Brockville training camp for officers and was transferred to the Officer Candidate School in Saint-Jérôme, Quebec. In 1942, Mousseau joined the Montreal unit, Les Fusiliers Mont-Royal, in order to help bring the decimated unit back up to strength following the disastrous Dieppe Raid.

Mousseau quickly climbed the ranks to major. In 1944, he was one of the Army's youngest majors at age 23. In July 1944, Mousseau was injured during an attack in Beauvoir-Trotteval and was captured in Caen by the German Wehrmacht. Mousseau was taken to Paris, where he was treated at Hôpital de la Pitié. With the assistance of a network of nurses associated with the resistance, Mousseau escaped from the hospital and joined the French Resistance. Given his military experience and quick wits, Mousseau was put in command of a resistance cell in the heart of Paris, headquartered at the local police prefecture. During that time, he participated in a number of raids against the enemy in order to disrupt traffic into Paris in view of the liberation of Paris. When the Allies moved into Paris, Mousseau returned to England and rejoined his unit in Belgium. Returning to duty as a company commander, Mousseau commanded the Fusiliers Mont-Royal contingent that occupied Berlin in 1945. In October 1945, he returned to Montreal and served as deputy Commanding Officer to the Fusiliers Mont Royal. For his actions in France, Mousseau was awarded the Croix de Guerre avec étoile d'argent.

== Post-war ==
The war over, Mousseau returned to his home town and his home unit, Le Régiment de Hull. He completed his studies in accounting and became the general manager for a construction firm. In the years that followed, Mousseau was a successful civil servant and served in a number of senior appointments. In 1948, Fernand Mousseau was promoted to Lieutenant-colonel and took command of Le Régiment de Hull until 1952. He then went on to serve as Honorary Colonel to Le Fusiliers Mont-Royal.

In 2006, he was inducted into the French Legion of Honour (Légion d'honneur) as a Knight.

== Death ==
Mousseau died in Gatineau, on April 26, 2010, from Alzheimer's disease. Colonel Mousseau was accorded a full military funeral and was carried by members of Le Régiment de Hull and les Fusiliers Mont-Royal.
