= 230th Battalion (Voltigeurs Canadiens-Français), CEF =

230th Canadian Forestry Battalion, CEF
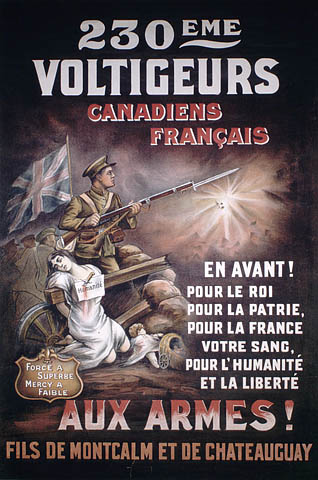
- Active: 1916–1917
- Disbanded: 1918
- Country: Canada
- Branch: Canadian Expeditionary Force
- Type: Infantry
- Role: Forestry
- Mobilization headquarters: Ottawa, Ontario
- Battle honours: The Great War, 1917

The 230th (Voltigeurs Canadiens-Français) Battalion, CEF was a unit in the Canadian Expeditionary Force during the First World War.

== History ==
Based in Ottawa, Ontario, the unit began recruiting in early 1916 in eastern Ontario, Hull, Quebec, and the surrounding district. The battalion also drew heavily from members of the 70th Regiment, based in Hull, Quebec. The battalion became the 230th "Overseas" Canadian Forestry Battalion, CEF, in October 1916. This unit apparently sent six drafts overseas in 1917; these were on January 23 (SS Scandinavia), January 26 (SS Grampian), March 3 (SS Ausonia), May 3 (SS Justicia), June 2 (SS Olympic), and June 25 (SS Justicia).

The 230th Battalion was disbanded in 1918. In 1929, the battalion was awarded the theatre of war honour "The Great War, 1917".

== Perpetuation ==
Following the war, it was perpetuated by the 70th Regiment, which is still active as Le Régiment de Hull.
