= Dollard Ménard =

Canadian general

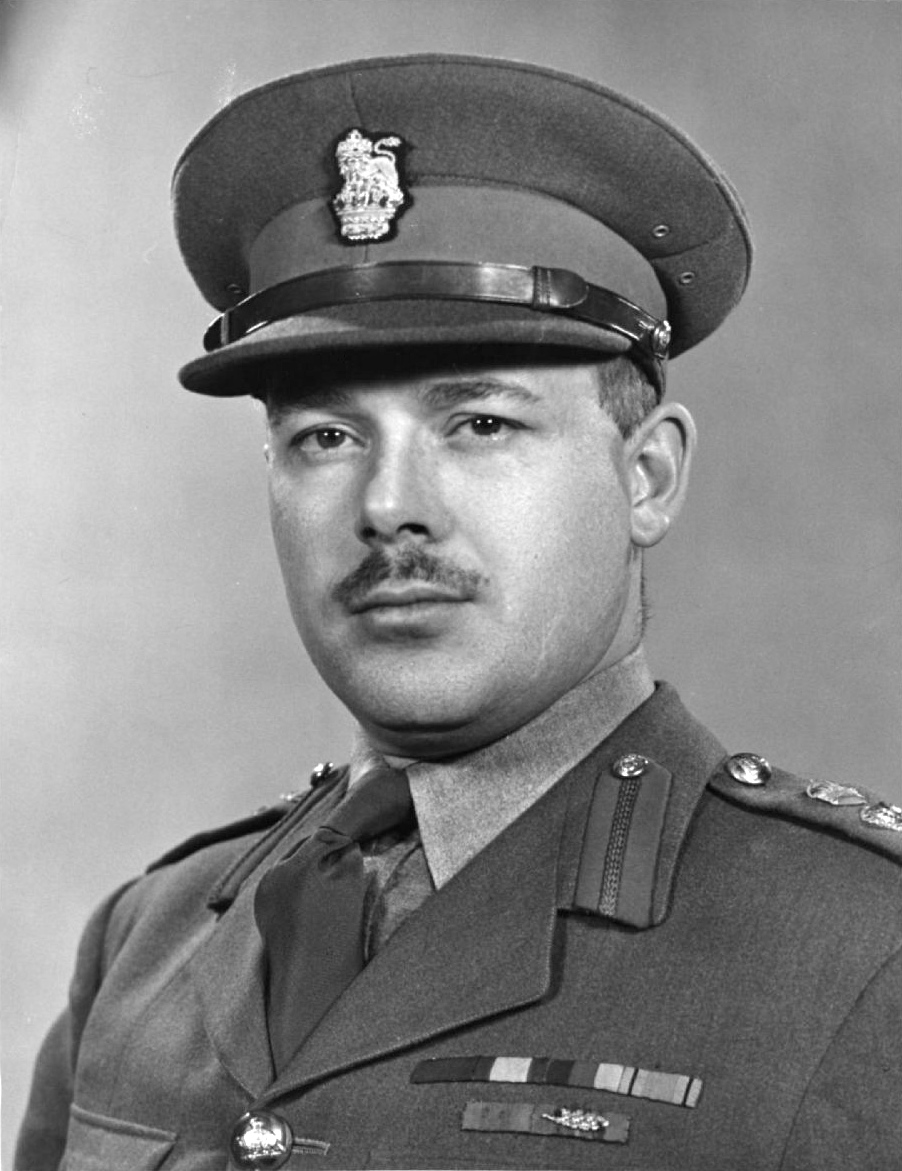
- Colonel Dollard Ménard c.1940s
- Born: 7 March 1913; Quebec, Canada
- Died: 14 January 1997 (aged 83)
- Military career
- Allegiance: Canada
- Branch: Canadian Army
- Service years: 1932–1965
- Rank: Brigadier
- Commands: East Sector of Quebec; Les Fusiliers Mont-Royal; Royal 22^{e} Régiment; Le Régiment de Hull
- Conflicts: Waziristan campaign Second World War: Dieppe Raid
- Awards: Distinguished Service Order; Grand Officer of the National Order of Quebec; Canadian Forces' Decoration; Legion of Honour (France); Croix de guerre (France)

Brigadier Dollard Ménard DSO, GOQ, CD (7 March 1913 – 14 January 1997) was a senior officer in the Canadian Army. As a lieutenant colonel, he was wounded five times during the Dieppe Raid in 1942 while leading Les Fusiliers Mont-Royal. His story inspired a famous Canadian World War II poster Ce qu’il faut pour vaincre (What it takes to win). He was later made a Companion of the Distinguished Service Order. Since all of the other commanding officers were either killed or captured, he was the only commanding officer who had landed at Dieppe to return to Britain after the raid.

== Military career ==
Upon graduation from the Royal Military College of Canada, student # 2290 in 1932, he received his lieutenant's commission in 1936 in the Royal 22^{e} Régiment ("the Van Doos"). He served in India in the infantry, the cavalry and the tanks from 1938 to 1940 and took part in the Waziristan campaign. In March 1940, he was promoted to captain and joined the staff of the Inspector General for the East of Canada. He was commanding officer of the East Sector of Quebec, which included amongst others Camp Valcartier from 1958 to 1962. He insisted that all units under his command with a francophone majority use French for drill and parade orders.

He was posted to Army Headquarters, Ottawa, in 1962, to work with Major-General Arthur Wrinch, who was Major-General Survival. He remained at Army Headquarters until he retired in 1965.

== Later life ==
In 1994, he was made a Grand Officer of the National Order of Quebec. His citation for the Order of the Army reads:

While he commanded his battalion during the operation of Dieppe, on August 19, 1942, this officer gave evidence of the highest qualities of courage and of initiative. He was wounded at the beginning of the raid, as he landed with the first groups of assault, but he continued to steer the operations of his unit by wireless telegraphy, under a fire fed by machine guns, by mortars and by artillery. Later, with the aim of reaching a more favourable position, he dragged himself up to a high point of the ground, but he was again wounded. Even after having been transported aboard a landing barge, and although wounded for the fifth time, he continued to insist on organizing the defense against planes, and taking care of his men. He put an example which is in the best tradition of the Army and was an inspiration for all the officers and the privates of his battalion.

Aged 83, Ménard died on 14 January 1997.

== Medals for sale ==
In 2005, a member of his family put his medals up for auction. This raised considerable media attention due to the risk of the medals being purchased by non-Canadians. Quebec philanthropist Ivonis Mazzarolo paid $40,000 to keep the medals in Canada. http://northernblue.ca/mblog/index.php?url=http://northernblue.ca/mblog/archives/19-General-Dollard-Menards-Medals-Go-to-Les-Fusiliers-Mont-Royal.html&serendipity%5Bcview%5D=linear
