= 41st Battalion (French Canadian), CEF =

Canadian infantry battalion

41st Battalion, CEF
- Active: 1914–1916
- Country: Canada
- Branch: Canadian Expeditionary Force
- Type: Infantry
- Mobilization headquarters: Quebec City
- Battle honours: The Great War, 1915–16

Commanders
- Officer commanding: LCol Louis Henri Archambault

The 41st Battalion (French Canadian), CEF, was an infantry battalion of the Canadian Expeditionary Force (CEF) during the Great War. Raised in 1914, it struggled to find enough French-speaking officers and men to fill its ranks. It was posted to Britain in 1915 where it provided drafts to units of the Canadian Corps. The battalion's officers performed poorly and left a mark on the reputation of French Canadian troops within the CEF. The unit was absorbed into the 69th Battalion in 1916, and it was disbanded in 1920.

== Establishment ==
The 41st Battalion was authorized on 7 November 1914. The 41st Battalion recruited in the Province of Quebec and Ottawa, Ontario, and was mobilized at Quebec City where it was based at a immigrant-processing site. The battalion struggled to find sufficient French-speaking personnel to fill the ranks. The unit also suffered from a lack of French-speaking sergeant-instructors and officers, where English-speaking units could draw on residents of British origin and militia officers, who were predominantly English-speaking. In summer 1915 five of the unit's most experienced officers were drafted as reinforcements for other Canadian Expeditionary Force units already serving in France. A hundred enlisted men were also drafted as reinforcements for the 22nd Battalion (French Canadian).

== Deployment to Britain ==
The battalion embarked for Britain on 18 October 1915. The battalion provided reinforcements to the Canadian Corps in the field until 13 July 1916, when its personnel were absorbed by the 69th Battalion, CEF.

The 41st Battalion had one officer commanding during its existence, Lieutenant-Colonel Louis Henri Archambault, 18 October 1915 to 4 April 1916. Archambault was a former cadet instructor and was incompetent in the role. His second in command absconded with $900 from the battalion's funds, and his successor, and the chaplain, were drunkards. The assistant adjutant was convicted of murder when the unit was posted to England for training and escaped a death sentence only by being found to be "feeble-minded". A second member of the battalion was also tried for murder during this period. The unit's reputation tainted that of other French-Canadian units in the CEF and was part of the reason it was broken up for reinforcements.

== Disbandment and legacy ==
The battalion was disbanded on 15 September 1920. The 41st Battalion was awarded the battle honour "The Great War, 1915–16". Since 1961, the 41st Battalion has been perpetuated by the Régiment de Maisonneuve.

== Sources ==
- Canadian Expeditionary Force 1914-1919 by Col. G.W.L. Nicholson, CD, Queen's Printer, Ottawa, Ontario, 1962
