= 206th (Canadien-Français) Battalion, CEF =

The 206th (Canadien-Francais) Battalion, CEF was a unit in the Canadian Expeditionary Force during the First World War.

== History ==
Based in Montreal, Quebec, the unit began recruiting during the winter of 1915/16 in the counties of Beauharnois, La Prairie, and Terrebonne.

The battalion was absorbed into the 167th Battalion, CEF on August 17, 1916, while still in Canada. The 206th (Canadien-Francais) Battalion, CEF had one Officer Commanding: Lieut-Col. T. Pagnuelo.

The 206th Battalion was initially perpetuated in 1920 by Le Régiment Châteauguay et Beauharnois (renamed to Le Régiment de Châteauguay in 1921). The perpetuation was transferred to Le Régiment de Maisonneuve in 1922.
