= Salaberry Armoury =

- Manège militaire Salaberry
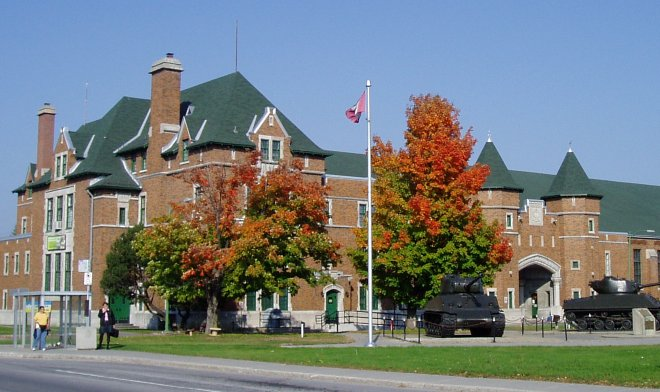
- The Salaberry Armoury
- Interactive map of the Salaberry Armoury area

General information
- Type: Drill Hall / armoury
- Architectural style: late Château Style
- Location: 188, boulevard Alexandre-Taché; Gatineau, Quebec; J9A 1L8
- Current tenants: Régiment de Hull
- Construction started: 1930s
- Completed: 1938/01/01
- Client: Canadian Army
- Owner: Canadian Forces Crown Owned

Dimensions
- Other dimensions: 2.0800 ha (5.140 acres)

Technical details
- Structural system: steeply pitched gable roof
- Floor area: 5,578 m^{2} (60,040 sq ft)

Design and construction
- Architect: Lucien Sarra-Bournet
- Awards and prizes: Canada's Register of Historic Places; Recognized – 1993/05/13 Register of the Government of Canada Heritage Buildings

The Salaberry Armoury (French: Manège militaire Salaberry), is an historic armoury located in Gatineau, Quebec, Canada, that is home to the armoured Régiment de Hull. The 5,578 m^{2} (60,040 sq ft) armoury located just to the west of the Hull sector in downtown Gatineau on a 2.0800 ha (5.140 acres) lot. The armoury is a prominent local landmark. In the Canadian Forces, an armoury is a place where a reserve unit trains, meets, and parades.

== History ==
Le Régiment de Hull, which is housed in Salaberry Armoury, formed on 7 August 1914. The Regiment, which is a unit of the Reserve Armoured Corps, is the only Francophone unit in the National Capital Region. The armoury was built beginning on 1 January 1938, designed by the architect Lucien Sarra-Bournet in the late Château Style with a steeply pitched gable roof and prominent chimneys.

The armoury was named after Colonel Charles de Salaberry, a hero of the War of 1812. The armoury, which has been identified as an historic site is one of a series of armouries built across Canada during the 1930s. During World War II, this building was the scene of local recruitment efforts.

Salaberry Armoury is a Recognized Federal Heritage Building.

== Legacy ==
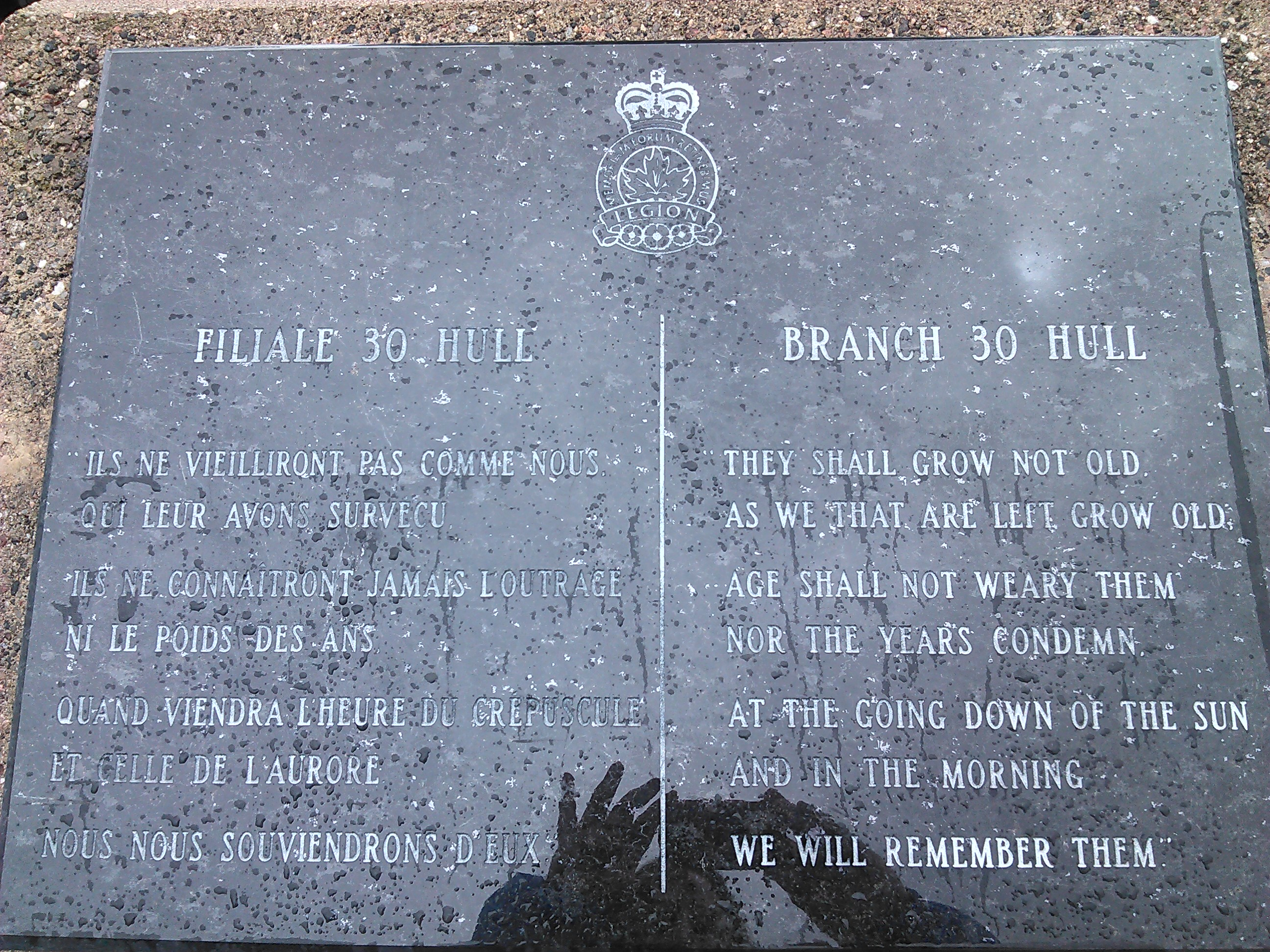
Salaberry Armoury plaque

A plaque was erected by the Royal Canadian Legion Branch 30 Hull with a quote from the poem For the Fallen by Robert Laurence Binyon: "They shall grow not old, as we that are left grow old: Age shall not weary them, nor the years condemn. At the going down of the sun and in the morning We will remember them"

A plaque was erected in the spring of 1974 for the 60th anniversary of the founding of the Regiment de Hull.

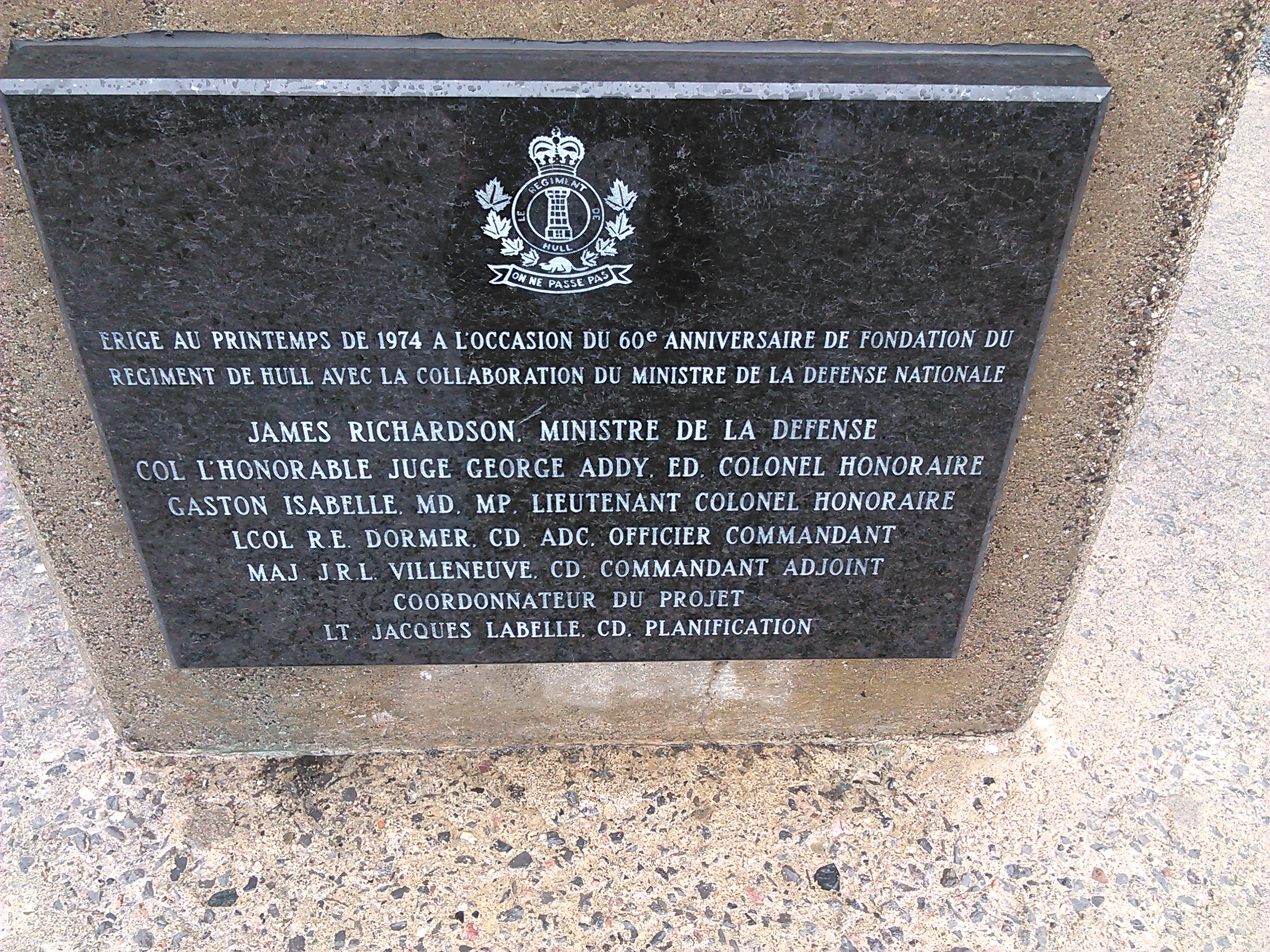
Salaberry Armoury plaque

== See also ==
- List of armouries in Canada
