= 167th (Canadien-Français) Battalion, CEF =

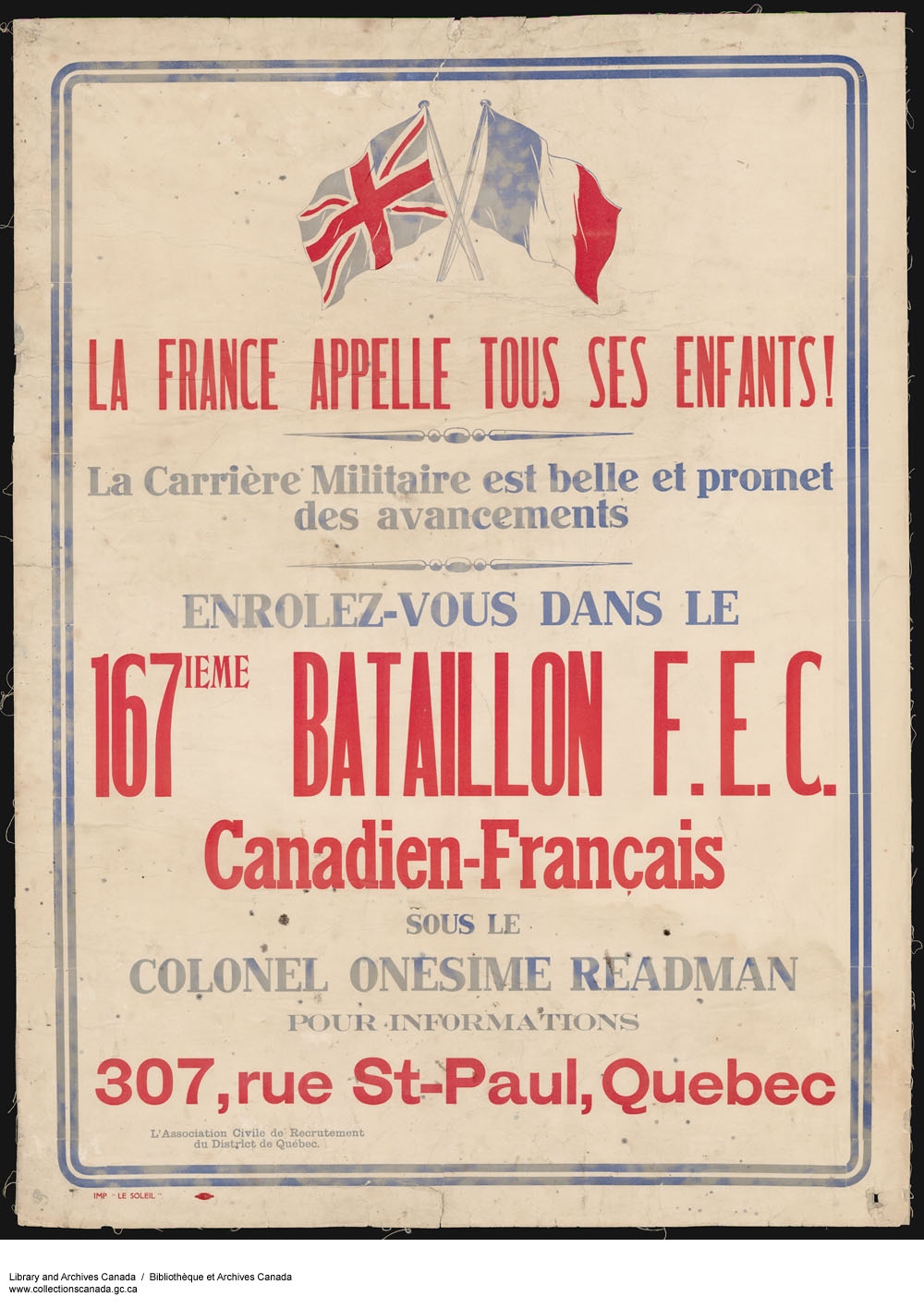
France Calls All Its Children! Join the 167th (Canadien-Français) Battalion, C.E.F.

The 167th (Canadien-Français) Battalion, CEF was a unit in the Canadian Expeditionary Force during the First World War. Headquartered in Quebec City, Quebec, the unit began recruiting during the winter of 1915/16. The unit never sailed for England and on January 15, 1917, became the Quebec Recruiting Depot. The 167th (Canadien-Francais) Battalion, CEF had one Officer Commanding: Lieut-Col. Onésime Readman.

== See also ==
- 206th (Canadien-Français) Battalion, CEF
