= SS Ausonia (1909) =

British passenger ship (1909–1918)

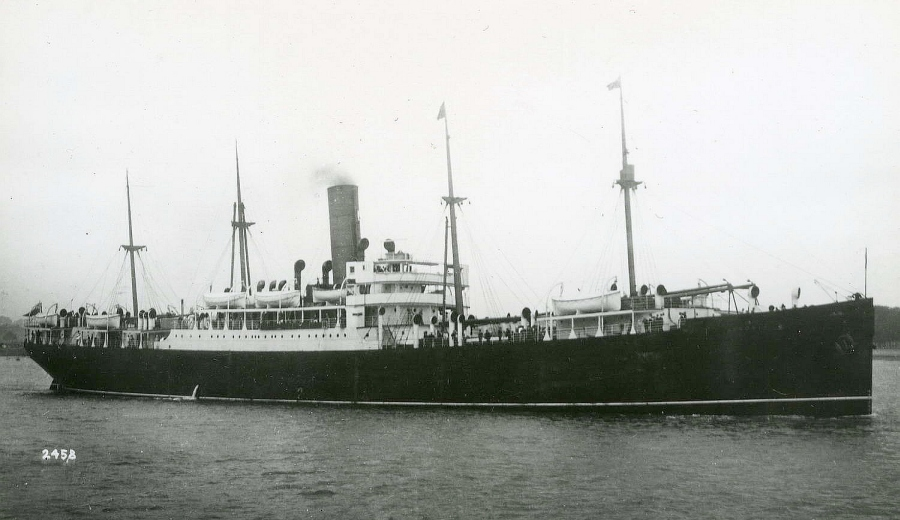
- SS Ausonia in 1911

History

United Kingdom
- Name: Tortona (1909–1911); Ausonia (1911–1918)
- Owner: Cairn-Thomson Line (1909–1911); Cunard Line (1911–1918)
- Port of registry: (United Kingdom of Great Britain and Ireland) Liverpool
- Builder: Swan Hunter & Wigham Richardson Ltd.
- Yard number: 837
- Laid down: 1909
- Launched: 18 August 1909
- Completed: September 1909
- Acquired: September 1909
- Maiden voyage: 22 October 1909
- In service: 22 October 1909
- Out of service: 30 May 1918
- Identification: Official number: 129735
- Fate: Torpedoed and sunk on 30 May 1918
- Notes: Call letters: HPTV

General characteristics
- Type: Passenger ship
- Tonnage: 7,907 GRT
- Length: 137.3 m (450 ft 6 in)
- Beam: 16.5 m (54 ft 2 in)
- Depth: 8.9 m (29 ft 2 in)
- Installed power: Twin triple expansion engines
- Propulsion: 2 screw propellers
- Speed: 14 knots (26 km/h; 16 mph)
- Capacity: 1,037 passengers (37 1st-class & 1,000 steerage)
- Crew: 140

SS Ausonia was a British passenger ship that was torpedoed and sunk by the German submarine SM U-62 620 nautical miles (1,150 km; 710 mi) west south west of the Fastnet Rock in the Atlantic Ocean on 30 May 1918 with the loss of 44 lives, while she was travelling from Liverpool, United Kingdom to New York City, United States with general cargo.

== Construction ==
Ausonia was launched as Tortona for the Cairn-Thomson Line at the Swan Hunter & Wigham Richardson Ltd. shipyard in Wallsend, United Kingdom on 18 August 1909, and completed the following month. The ship was 137.3 metres (450 ft 6 in) long, had a beam of 16.5 metres (54 ft 2 in) and a depth of 8.9 metres (29 ft 2 in). She was assessed at 7,907 gross register tons (GRT) and had a pair of triple expansion engines producing 888 nominal horsepower, driving twin screw propellers. The ship could reach a maximum speed of 14 knots (26 km/h; 16 mph) and had four masts and one funnel. As built, she had the capacity to carry 37 1st-class and 1,000 steerage passengers.

== Early career ==
For her maiden voyage she sailed from Middlesbrough on 22 October 1909, calling also at Quebec, en route to Montreal. Tortona departed Montreal on 20 November 1909 for Livorno with stops in Quebec, Naples and Genoa. She made her first crossing from Naples to Portland in March 1910, and went on to serve on the Naples – Quebec – Montreal and London – Quebec –Montreal routes.

Tortona was purchased by the Cunard Line in 1911 for £120,000 and renamed Ausonia. She made her maiden voyage as a Cunard vessel on 16 May 1911 under the new London – Southampton – Quebec – Montreal route. A route she would serve until 1914, when she completed four voyages on the Glasgow – Moville – New York route, before resuming her previous Canadian route.

== World War I service and sinking ==
At the outbreak of World War I in August 1914, Ausonia was requisitioned by the Admiralty as a troopship to mainly serve in the Mediterranean Sea. In April 1915, Ausonia carried the 1st Royal Dublin Fusiliers from the United Kingdom to Lemnos. She would evacuate that same regiment from Lemnos following the Allied defeat at Gallipoli in January 1916.

Ausonia had her first encounter with a German submarine off the coast of southern Ireland on 11 June 1917, when she was hit by a single torpedo from SM U-55 while she was travelling from Montreal, Canada to Avonmouth, United Kingdom. A single person was killed in the explosion and the ship sustained serious damage. But Ausonia managed to stay afloat long enough to reach the Irish port of Queenstown, where she was repaired and later returned to service.

Ausonia was travelling from Liverpool, United Kingdom to New York City, United States under the command of Captain Robert Capper while carrying 140 crew members and general cargo, when she was hit by a torpedo from SM U-62 620 nautical miles (1,150 km; 710 mi) west south west of the Fastnet Rock in the Atlantic Ocean on 30 May 1918. The initial explosion killed eight crew members and had damaged the ship, but not enough to sink her. Noticing this, Kapitänleutnant Ernst Hashagen of SM U-62 ordered to surface the U-boat about 45 minutes after having torpedoed Ausonia and began to shell the ship with artillery fire. The surviving crew were able to abandon ship in her lifeboats before the shelling began and subsequently watched the Ausonia founder. The survivors drifted in the lifeboats for eight days before being rescued by HMS Zinnia on 8 June 1918 and landed at Castletownbere. An additional 35 crew died before rescue arrived and another badly injured survivor died two days after being rescued in a Liverpool hospital, bringing the total death toll to 44.

== Wreck ==
The wreck of Ausonia lies at 47°59′N 23°42′W in 8,730 feet (2,660 m) of water. The current condition of the wreck is unknown.
