= 150th Battalion (Carabiniers Mont-Royal), CEF =

“Canadiens Francais” war poster created [between 1914 and 1918] from the Archives of Ontario poster collection.

The 150th (Carabiniers Mont Royal) Battalion, CEF was a unit in the Canadian Expeditionary Force during the First World War. Based in Montreal, Quebec, the unit began recruiting in late 1915 in that city and the surrounding district. After sailing to England in September 1916, the battalion was absorbed into the 14th, 22nd, 24th, and 87th Battalions, CEF, and the 5th Canadian Mounted Rifles. The unit officially ceased to exist as of February 15, 1918. The 150th (Carabiniers Mont Royal) Battalion, CEF had one Officer Commanding: Lieut-Col. Hercule Barre.
