= 69th Battalion (Canadien-Français), CEF =

Canadian infantry battalion

The 69th Battalion (Canadien-Français), CEF was an infantry battalion of the Canadian Expeditionary Force during the Great War. The 69th Battalion was authorized on 10 July 1915 and embarked for Britain on 17 April 1916. The battalion provided reinforcements to the Canadian Corps in the field until 4 January 1917, when its personnel were absorbed by the 10th Reserve Battalion, CEF. The battalion was disbanded on 30 August 1920.

The 69th Battalion recruited throughout the province of Quebec and was mobilized at Montreal.

The 69th Battalion was commanded by Lt.-Col. J.A. Dansereau from 19 April 1916 to 4 January 1917.

The 69th Battalion was awarded the battle honour THE GREAT WAR 1916-17.

The 69th Battalion (Canadien-Français), CEF is perpetuated by Les Fusiliers Mont-Royal.

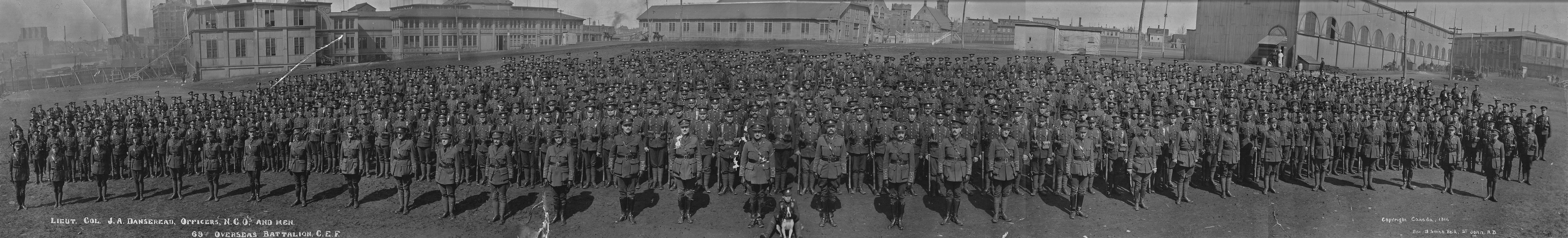

== Sources ==
- Canadian Expeditionary Force 1914-1919 by Col. G.W.L. Nicholson, CD, Queen's Printer, Ottawa, Ontario, 1962
