= Fusiliers Mont-Royal =

Coordinates: 45.518°N 73.5722°W

Les Fusiliers Mont-Royal
- Regimental cap badge
- Active: 1869–present
- Country: Canada
- Branch: Canadian Army
- Type: Light infantry
- Size: 1 battalion
- Part of: 34 Canadian Brigade Group
- Garrison/HQ: 3721 Henri-Julien Avenue, Montreal, Quebec
- Motto: Nunquam retrorsum (Latin for 'never backward')
- March: "The Jockey of York"
- Engagements: North-West Rebellion; First World War; Second World War; War in Afghanistan
- Battle honours: See #Battle honours
- Website: lesfusiliersmont-royal.com

Commanders
- Notable commanders: Lt.-Col. (later Gen.) Jacques Alfred Dextraze

Les Fusiliers Mont-Royal is a Primary Reserve infantry regiment of the Canadian Army. Founded in 1869, this francophone unit mobilized in 1885 to suppress the North-West Rebellion, and in the Second World War it raised an overseas battalion that fought in the Dieppe Raid and other campaigns in northwest Europe.

== Lineage ==
Regimental colour

Camp flag

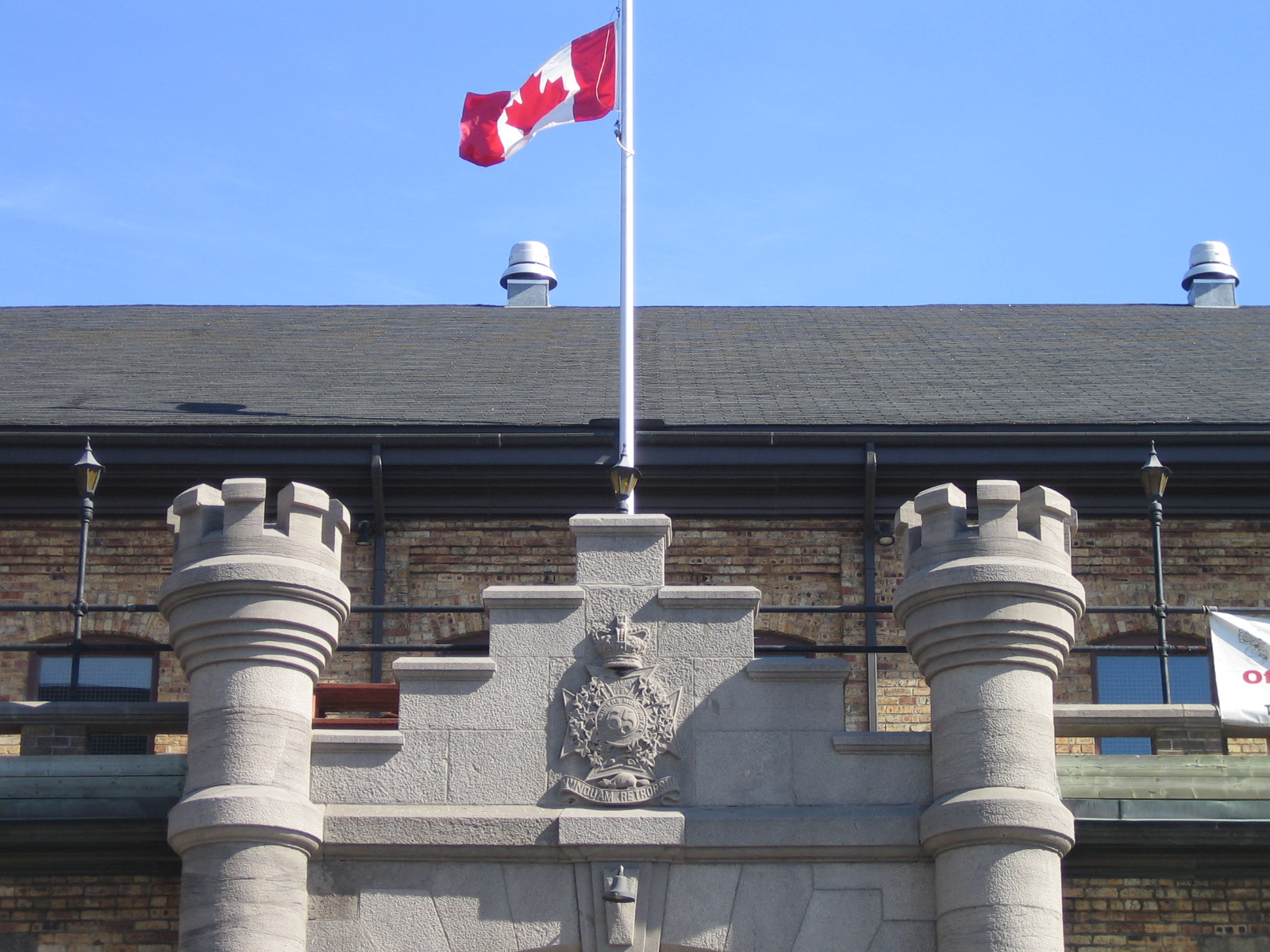
Entrance of the regimental armoury

Les Fusiliers Mont-Royal originated in Montreal, Quebec on 18 June 1869 as The Mount Royal Rifles. It was redesignated as the 65th Battalion, Mount Royal Rifles on 5 November 1869, as the 65th Regiment "Mount Royal Rifles" on 8 May 1900 as the 65th Regiment "Carabiniers Mont-Royal" on 1 August 1902, as Les Carabiniers Mont-Royal on 29 March 1920, as Les Fusiliers Mont-Royal on 15 April 1931, as the 2nd (Reserve) Battalion, Les Fusiliers Mont-Royal on 7 November 1940 and finally as Les Fusiliers Mont-Royal on 15 November 1945.

Upon redesignation as Les Carabiniers Mont-Royal on 29 March 1920 it was organized as a two-battalion regiment with the 1st Battalion (perpetuating the 69th Battalion (Canadien-Français), CEF) on the Non-Permanent Active Militia order of battle, and the 2nd Battalion (perpetuating the 150th Battalion (Carabiniers Mont-Royal), CEF) on the Reserve order of battle. The reserve unit was disbanded on 14 December 1936.

On 4 May 1951, Les Fusiliers Mont-Royal mobilized two temporary Active Force companies designated "E" and "F" Company. "E" Company was reduced to nil strength upon its personnel being incorporated into the 1st Canadian Infantry Battalion (later the 3rd Battalion, The Canadian Guards) for service in Germany with the North Atlantic Treaty Organization. It was disbanded on 29 July 1953. "F" Company was initially used as a reinforcement pool for "E" Company. On 15 May 1952, it was reduced to nil strength, upon its personnel being absorbed by the newly formed 2nd Canadian Infantry Battalion (later the 4th Battalion, The Canadian Guards) for service in Korea with the United Nations. "F" Company was disbanded on 29 July 1953.

Lineage chart

1812	2nd and 3rd Bns (City of Montreal)	Longue-Pointe and Pointe-Claire Divisions
1815	Disbanded	Disbanded
1869	The Mount Royal Rifles
1869	65th Bn, Mount Royal Rifles
1885	65th Mounted Rifles, "Mount Royal Rifles" (Note: Mobilized for active service)
1885	65th Bn, Mount Royal Rifles (Note: Removed from active service)
1900	65th Regt "Mount Royal Rifles"
1902	65th Regt "Carabiniers Mont-Royal"
1915	69th "Overseas" Bn, CEF
1916	150th "Overseas" Bn, CEF
1917	Absorbed by 10th Reserve Bn
1918	Absorbed by 10th Reserve Bn
1920	1st Bn (69th Bn, CEF), Les Carabiniers Mont-Royal	2nd Bn (150th Bn, CEF), (Note: Reserve) Les Carabiniers Mont-Royal
1931	1st Bn (69th Bn, CEF), Les Fusiliers Mont-Royal	2nd Bn (150th Bn, CEF), Les Fusiliers Mont-Royal
1936	Les Fusiliers Mont-Royal	Disbanded
1940	1st Bn, Les Fusiliers Mont-Royal, CASF	2nd (Reserve) Bn, Les Fusiliers Mont-Royal
1942	3rd Bn, Les Fusiliers de Mont-Royal, CASF
1943	Disbanded
1945	Disbanded	Les Fusiliers Mont-Royal
1951	"E" Coy, (Note: Regular Force) Les Fusiliers Mont-Royal	"F" Coy, Les Fusiliers Mont-Royal
1951	Absorbed by 1st Canadian Infy Bn
1952	Absorbed by 2nd Canadian Infy Bn
2012	Perpetuates War of 1812 units

== Perpetuations ==
Les Fusiliers Mont-Royal perpetuate the 2nd and 3rd Battalions (City of Montreal) (1812–15), Longue-Pointe and Pointe-Claire Divisions (1812–15), the 69th Battalion (Canadien-Français), CEF and the 150th Battalion (Carabiniers Mont-Royal), CEF.

== Operational history ==
=== North-West Rebellion ===
The battalion was mobilized for active service, under the designation 65th Mounted Rifles, "Mount Royal Rifles" on 10 April 1885. It served in the Alberta Column of the North West-Field Force. The battalion was removed from active service on 24 July 1885.

=== Great War ===
Details of the regiment were placed on active service on 6 August 1914 for local protective duty.

The 69th Battalion (Canadien-Français), CEF was authorized on 10 July 1915 and embarked for Britain on 17 April 1916. The battalion provided reinforcements to the Canadian Corps in the field until 4 January 1917, when its personnel were absorbed by the 10th Reserve Battalion, CEF. The battalion was disbanded on 30 August 1920.

150th Battalion (Carabiniers Mont-Royal), CEF, was authorized on 22 December 1915 and embarked for Britain on 29 September 1916. The battalion provided reinforcements to the Canadian Corps in the field until February 1917, when it was allotted to the 14th Infantry Brigade, 5th Canadian Division in England. On 15 February 1918 its personnel were absorbed by the 10th Reserve Battalion, CEF. The battalion was disbanded on 29 November 1918.21

=== Second World War ===
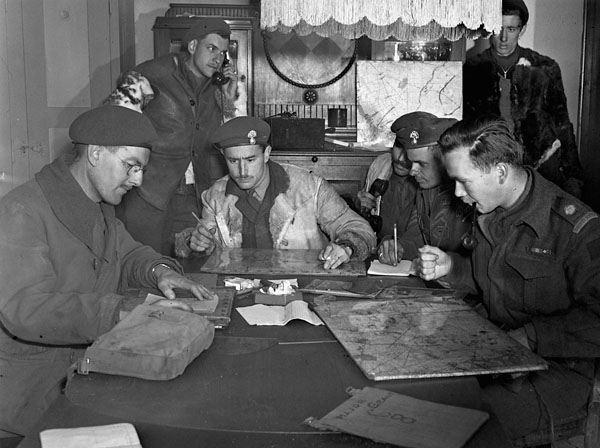
Tactical headquarters of the 1st Battalion, Munderloh, Germany, 29 April 1945

The regiment mobilized the Les Fusiliers Mont-Royal, CASF for active service on 1 September 1939. It was redesignated as the 1st Battalion, Les Fusiliers Mont-Royal, CASF on 7 November 1940. It embarked for garrison duty in Iceland with "Z" Force on 1 July 1940. On 31 October 1940 it was transferred to Great Britain. The regiment took part in OPERATION JUBILEE, the raid on Dieppe on 19 August 1942. It returned to France on 7 July 1944, as part of the 6th Canadian Infantry Brigade, 2nd Canadian Infantry Division, and it continued to fight in North-West Europe until the end of the war. The overseas battalion was disbanded on 15 November 1945.

The regiment mobilized the 3rd Battalion, Les Fusiliers de Mont-Royal, CASF for active service on 12 May 1942. It served in Canada in a home defence role as part of Military District No. 5 and the 7th Canadian Infantry Division. The battalion was disbanded on 15 October 1943.

=== War in Afghanistan ===
The regiment contributed an aggregate of more than 20% of its authorized strength to the various Task Forces which served in Afghanistan between 2002 and 2014.

== Battle honours ==
Regimental colour

In the list below, battle honours in capitals were awarded for participation in large operations and campaigns, while those in lowercase indicate honours granted for more specific battles. Battle honours in bold type are emblazoned on the regimental colour.

War of 1812
Defence of Canada – 1812–1815 – Défense du Canada
Non-emblazonable honorary distinction Defence of Canada – 1812–1815 – Défense du Canada
North West Rebellion
North-West Canada, 1885.
First World War
- **Ypres, 1915, '17**
- **Festubert, 1915**
- **Somme, 1916**
- **Arras, 1917, '18**
- **Hill 70**
- **Amiens**
- **Hindenburg Line**
- **Pursuit to Mons**
Second World War
- **Dieppe**
- Bourguébus Ridge
- **St. André-sur-Orne**
- **Verrières Ridge–Tilly-la-Campagne**
- **Falaise**
- Falaise Road
- The Laison
- Forêt de la Londe
- **Dunkirk, 1944**
- **Antwerp–Turnhout Canal**
- The Scheldt
- Woensdrecht
- **South Beveland**
- The Rhineland
- **The Hochwald**
- **Xanten**
- The Rhine
- **Groningen**
- Oldenburg
- North-West Europe, 1942, 1944–1945
South-West Asia
Afghanistan

== Regimental associations ==
Former members may join the active associations from the Officers Mess and the Sergents Mess. L'Association les Anciens Sergents Les Fusiliers Mont-Royal accepts retired members of the Junior Ranks Mess as associate members.

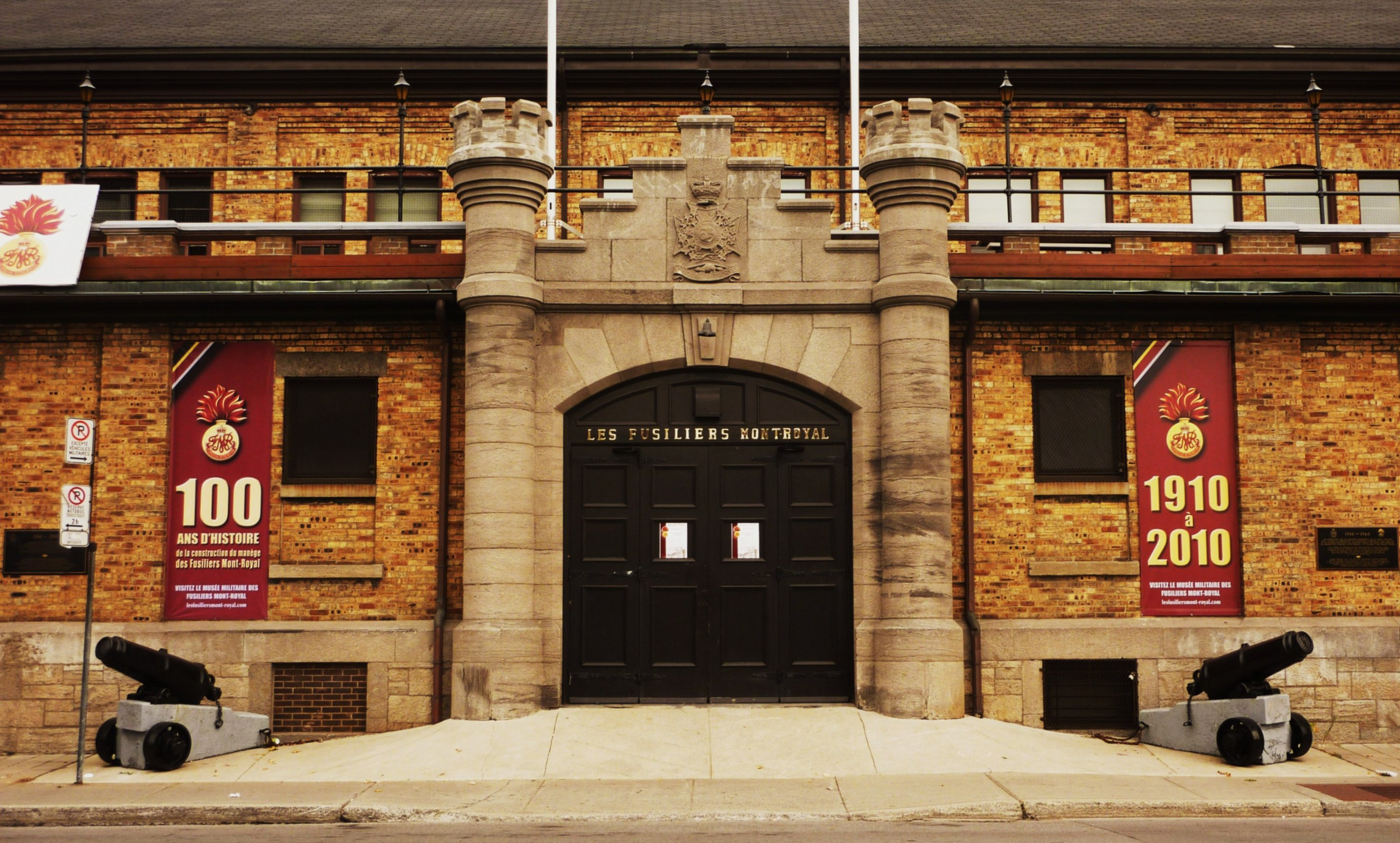
Regimental armoury

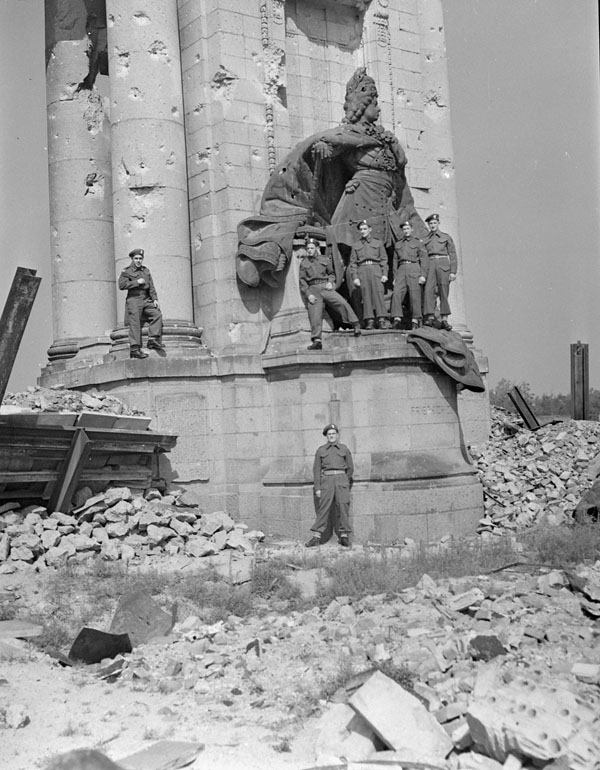
Infantrymen of the 1st Battalion in front of Charlottenburger Tor, Berlin, Germany, 14 July 1945

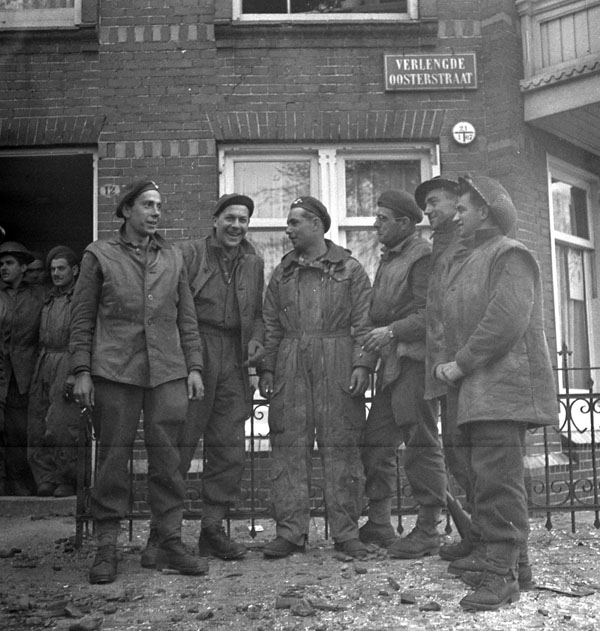
Infantrymen of the 1st Battalion, Groningen, Netherlands

== Regimental headquarters ==
The address of Les Fusiliers Mont-Royal is 3721 Henri-Julien Street, Montreal.

== Armoury ==
Site	Date(s)	Designated	Description
Manège Henri-Julien; 3721 Henri Julien Street; Montreal, Quebec	1911	Canada's Register of Historic Places; Recognized - 1992 Register of the Government of Canada Heritage Buildings	this centrally located armoury is on a corner site, in a densely packed, mixed neighbourhood

== Les Fusiliers Mont-Royal Museum ==
Les Fusiliers Mont-Royal Museum
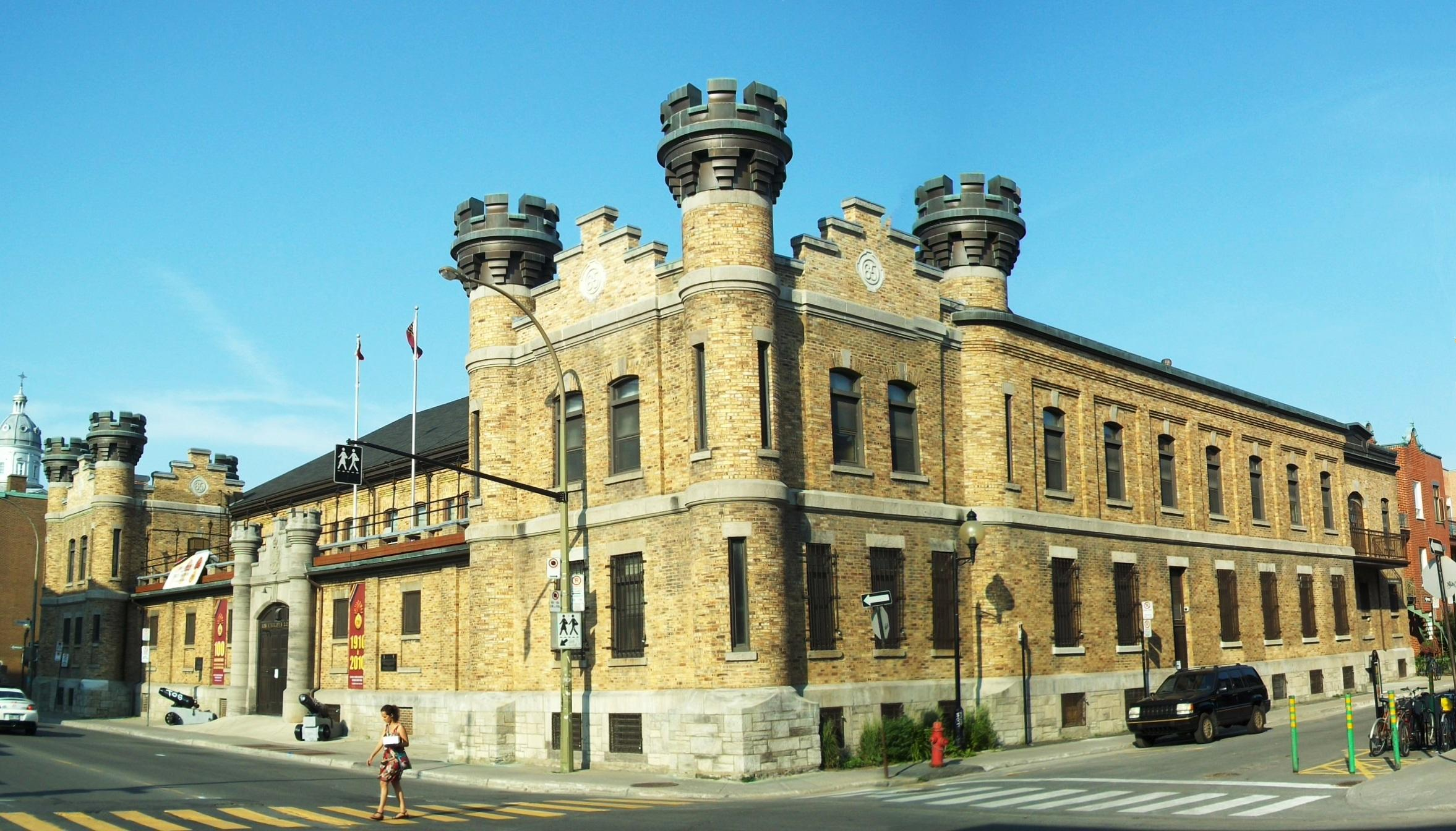
- Location: 3721 Henri-Julien Avenue, Montreal
- Type: Regimental Museum
- Website: lesfusiliersmont-royal.com\spip.php?rubrique23

Raoul Adolphe Brassard (1877–1927), an officer of the 65th Regiment, served as the architect for the Armoury of the Fusiliers Mont-Royal in Montreal. The museum features uniforms, medals, patches, photographs and other unit memorabilia. It is open on Tuesday evenings and by appointment. The museum collects, preserves, and shows, documents, artifacts, photos which illustrate the military life of our regiment in the city of Montreal in all aspects of life in peace and in war. The Museum is affiliated with: CMA, CHIN, OMMC and Virtual Museum of Canada.

== Order of precedence ==
Preceded by 6^{e} Bataillon, Royal 22^{e} Régiment	Les Fusiliers Mont-Royal	Succeeded by The Princess Louise Fusiliers

== See also ==
- List of armouries in Canada
- Military history of Canada
- History of the Canadian Army
- Canadian Forces
