= New Brunswick Rangers =

The New Brunswick Rangers
- Active: 1870-1946
- Country: Canada
- Branch: Canadian Militia (1870-1940); Canadian Army (1940-1946)
- Type: Line infantry
- Role: Infantry
- Size: One regiment
- Part of: Non-Permanent Active Militia (1870-1940); Royal Canadian Infantry Corps (1942-1946)
- Garrison/HQ: Sussex, New Brunswick
- Engagements: First World War; Second World War
- Battle honours: See #Battle Honours

The New Brunswick Rangers was an infantry regiment of the Non-Permanent Active Militia of the Canadian Militia (now the Canadian Army). In 1946, the regiment was amalgamated with The Saint John Fusiliers to form The South New Brunswick Regiment which was later renamed as The New Brunswick Scottish. They now form part of the 1st Battalion, The Royal New Brunswick Regiment.

== Lineage ==
=== The New Brunswick Rangers ===
- Originated on 12 August 1870, in Sussex, New Brunswick, as the 74th Battalion of Infantry.
- Redesignated on 8 May 1900, as the 74th Regiment.
- Redesignated on 2 November 1903, as the 74th Regiment The New Brunswick Rangers.
- Redesignated on 15 March 1920, as The New Brunswick Rangers.
- Redesignated on 1 January 1941, as the 2nd (Reserve) Battalion, The New Brunswick Rangers.
- Redesignated on 15 February 1946, as The New Brunswick Rangers.
- Amalgamated on 31 August 1946, with The Saint John Fusiliers (Machine Gun) and redesignated as The South New Brunswick Regiment (later redesignated on 2 December 1946, as The New Brunswick Scottish).

== Perpetuations ==
- 55th Battalion (New Brunswick & Prince Edward Island), CEF
- 145th Battalion (New Brunswick), CEF
- 236th Battalion (New Brunswick Kilties), CEF

== History ==
=== Early history ===
On 12 August, 1870, the 74th Battalion of Infantry was authorized for service. The regiment had companies at Kingston, Elgin, Sussex, Shemogue, Sackville and Bay Verte, New Brunswick.

On 8 May, 1900, the 74th Battalion of Infantry was reorganized and redesignated as the 74th Regiment. On 2 November, 1903, the regiment was redesignated again as the 74th Regiment The New Brunswick Rangers.

=== First World War ===
On 6 August 1914, Details of the 74th Regiment The New Brunswick Rangers were placed on active service for local protective duty.

When the Canadian Expeditionary Force was mobilized for overseas service, the 74th New Brunswick Rangers provided volunteers to form the 12th Battalion, CEF.

On 7 November 1914, the 55th Battalion (New Brunswick & Prince Edward Island), CEF was authorized for service and on 30 October 1915, the battalion embarked for Great Britain. After its arrival in the UK, the battalion provided reinforcements for the Canadian Corps in the field. On 6 July 1916, the battalion’s personnel were absorbed by the 40th Battalion (Nova Scotia), CEF. On 21 May 1917, the 55th Battalion, CEF was disbanded.

On 22 December 1915, the 145th Battalion (New Brunswick), CEF was authorized for service and on 25 September 1916, the battalion embarked for Great Britain. After its arrival in the UK, on 7 October 1916, the battalion’s personnel were absorbed by the 9th Battalion, CEF to provide reinforcements for the Canadian Corps in the field. On 17 July 1917, the 145th Battalion, CEF was disbanded.

On 15 July 1916, the 236th Battalion (New Brunswick Kilties), CEF was authorized for service and from between 30 October to 9 November 1917, the battalion embarked for Great Britain. After its arrival in the UK, the battalion provided reinforcements for the Canadian Corps in the field. On 13 March 1918, the battalion’s personnel were absorbed by the 20th Reserve Battalion, CEF. On 30 August 1920, the 236th Battalion, CEF was disbanded.

=== Second World War ===
On 1 January 1941, The New Brunswick Rangers mobilized the 1st Battalion, The New Brunswick Rangers, CASF for active service. From June 1942 to July 1943, the battalion served in Labrador in the home defence role as part of Atlantic Command.

On 13 September 1943, the battalion embarked for Great Britain and on 1 November 1943, was redesignated as the 10th Canadian Infantry Brigade Support Group (The New Brunswick Rangers), CIC, CASF.

On 24 February 1944, The New Brunswick Rangers were reorganized as the Independent Medium Machine Gun Company for the 10th Canadian Infantry Brigade and redesignated as the 10th Independent Machine Gun Company (The New Brunswick Rangers), CIC, CASF.

On 26 July 1944, the company landed in France along with the rest of the 10th Canadian Infantry Brigade, 4th Canadian Armoured Division, and continued to fight in North-West Europe until the end of the war. On 15 February 1946, the overseas company was disbanded.

== Organization ==
=== 74th Battalion of Infantry (12 August 1870) ===
- Regimental Headquarters (Sussex)
- No. 1 Company (Kingston) (first raised on 30 April, 1869 as the Kingston Infantry Company; later disbanded on 18 December, 1874. new company formed on 2 January, 1876 at Clifton)
- No. 2 Company (Elgin) (first raised on 2 July, 1869 as the Elgin Infantry Company; later disbanded on 18 December, 1874. new company formed on 2 January, 1876 at Petitcodiac; moved 23 December, 1887 to Moncton; moved 1 September, 1898 to Hampton)
- No. 3 Company (Sussex) (first raised on 10 September, 1869 as the Sussex Infantry Company)
- No. 4 Company (Shemogue) (first raised on 5 March, 1869 as the Shemogue Infantry Company; later moved on 27 February, 1891 to Moncton)
- No. 5 Company (Sackville) (first raised on 16 July, 1869 as the Sackville Infantry Company)
- No. 6 Company (Bay Verte) (first raised on 10 September 1869 as the Bay Verte Infantry Company)

=== 74th Regiment The New Brunswick Rangers (2 November 1903) ===
- Regimental Headquarters (Sussex)
- No. 1 Company (Clifton)
- No. 2 Company (Hampton)
- No. 3 Company (Sussex)
- No. 4 Company (Moncton)
- No. 5 Company (Sackville)
- No. 6 Company (Bay Verte)
- No. 7 Company (Hillsboro) (raised 1 Feb. 1903; later moved 1 August, 1908 to Hopewell Hill)
- No. 8 Company (Moncton) (raised 1 February, 1903)

=== The New Brunswick Rangers (15 September 1920) ===
- 1st Battalion (perpetuating the 55th Battalion, CEF)
  - A Company (Clifton)
  - B Company (Sussex)
  - C Company (Moncton)
  - D Company (Salisbury)
- 2nd (Reserve) Battalion (perpetuating the 145th Battalion, CEF)
- 3rd (Reserve) Battalion (perpetuating the 236th Battalion, CEF)

== Alliances ==
- United Kingdom - The Royal Sussex Regiment (Until 1946)

== Battle honours ==
=== Great War ===
- Mount Sorrel
- Somme, 1916
- Arras, 1917, '18
- Hill 70
- Ypres, 1917
- Amiens
- Hindenburg Line
- Pursuit to Mons

=== Second World War ===
- Falaise
- Falaise Road
- The Laison
- Chambois
- The Seine, 1944
- Moerbrugge
- The Scheldt
- Breskens Pocket
- The Lower Maas
- Kapelsche Veer
- The Rhineland
- The Rhine
- Küsten Canal
- Bad Zwischenahn
- North-West Europe, 1944–1945
