= New Brunswick Scottish =

The New Brunswick Scottish
- Active: 1946 - 1954
- Country: Canada
- Branch: Canadian Army
- Type: Line Infantry
- Role: Infantry
- Size: One battalion
- Part of: Royal Canadian Infantry Corps
- Garrison/HQ: Saint John, New Brunswick
- Motto: Nunquam Non Paratus
- Colors: Facing colour blue
- March: Quick - All the Blue Bonnets are over the Border, Highland Laddie & Pibroch o' Donald Dhu

Insignia
- Tartan: Leslie, Dress

The New Brunswick Scottish was an infantry regiment of the Canadian Army.

== History ==
Founded as The South New Brunswick Regiment in 1946 by the amalgamation of The Saint John Fusiliers (M.G.) and The New Brunswick Rangers, the regiment acquired its present title in 1946 shortly after establishment. In 1954, as a result of the Kennedy Report on the Reserve Army, this regiment was amalgamated with The Carleton and York Regiment to form 1st Battalion The Royal New Brunswick Regiment (Carleton and York).

The regiment before amalgamation held its final Order of Precedence as 30.

== Perpetuations ==
The regiment perpetuated the following units:

- 26th Battalion, CEF
- 55th Battalion (New Brunswick & Prince Edward Island), CEF
- 115th Battalion (New Brunswick), CEF
- 145th Battalion (New Brunswick), CEF
- 236th Battalion (New Brunswick Kilties), CEF
- 7th M.G. Battalion C.E.F

== Alliances ==
The New Brunswick Scottish were allied to the King's Own Scottish Borderers.

== Uniform ==
The New Brunswick Scottish were kitted with a blue glengarry c/w diced border, scarlet doublet, white sporran with two black points, scarlet & black hose, blue doublets for pipers and tartan trews for bandsmen, with full dress only for pipers and bandsmen.

== Battle honours ==
=== South African War ===
- South Africa 1899–1900 & 1902

=== The Great War ===
- Mount Sorrel,
- Somme 1916 & 18
- Flers-Courcelette
- Thiepval
- Ancre Heights
- Arras 1917 & 18
- Vimy 1917
- Arleux
- Scarpe 1917 & 18
- Hill 70
- Ypres 1917
- Passchendaele
- Amiens
- Hindenburg Line
- Canal du Nord
- Cambrai 1918
- Pursuit to Mons
- France and Flanders 1915-18

== See also ==
- Canadian-Scottish regiment
