= Carleton Light Infantry =

Infantry regiment of the Canadian Militia

- Active: 1869-1936
- Country: Canada
- Branch: Canadian Militia
- Type: Light Infantry
- Role: Infantry
- Part of: Non-Permanent Active Militia
- Garrison/HQ: Woodstock, NB
- Engagements: First World War
- Battle honours: See #Battle honours

The Carleton Light Infantry was an infantry regiment of the Non-Permanent Active Militia of the Canadian Militia (now the Canadian Army). In 1936, the regiment was Amalgamated with The York Regiment to form The Carleton and York Regiment.

== History ==
=== Early history ===
On 10 September 1869, the Carleton Light Infantry was authorized for service with companies at Centreville, Richmond, Victoria, Waterville, Brighton and Woodstock.

On 5 November 1869, the unit was redesignated as the 67th Battalion The Carleton Light Infantry.

On 8 May 1900, the 67th Battalion The Carleton Light Infantry was redesignated as the 67th Regiment The Carleton Light Infantry.

=== First World War ===
On 6 August 1914, Details of the 67th Regiment, The Carleton Light Infantry were placed on active service for local protective duty.

On 22 December 1915, the 104th Battalion, CEF was authorized for service and on 28 June 1916, the battalion embarked for Great Britain. After its arrival in the UK, the battalion provided reinforcements for the Canadian Corps in the field. On 24 January 1917, the battalion's personnel were absorbed by the 105th Battalion (Prince Edward Island Highlanders), CEF. On 27 July 1918, the 104th Battalion, CEF was disbanded.

In 1920 when the regiment was redesignated it "..was organized as a two battalion regiment with the 1st Battalion (44th Battalion, CEF) on the Non Permanent Active Militia order of battle, and the 2nd Battalion (104th Battalion, CEF) on the Reserve order of battle."

It thus gained an association with both the 44th and 104th Battalions CEF which were later recognised as official Perpetuations.

One of the regiment's most notable members was Lieutenant Colonel William Teel Baird.

== Alliances ==
- United Kingdom - The Queen's Own Royal West Kent Regiment (Until 1936)

== Lineage ==
- Originated on 10 September 1869, in Woodstock, New Brunswick, as The Carleton Light Infantry.
- Redesignated on 5 November 1869, as the 67th Battalion, The Carleton Light Infantry.
- Redesignated on 8 May 1900, as the 67th Regiment Carleton Light Infantry.
- Redesignated on 15 March 1920, as The Carleton Light Infantry.
- Amalgamated on 15 December 1936, with The York Regiment and Redesignated as The Carleton and York Regiment.

== Battle honours ==
- Mount Sorrel
- Somme, 1916
- Ancre Heights
- Ancre, 1916
- Arras, 1917, ‘18
- Vimy, 1917
- Hill 70
- Ypres, 1917
- Passchendaele
- Amiens
- Scarpe, 1918
- Drocourt-Quéant
- Hindenburg Line
- Canal du Nord
- Valenciennes
- France and Flanders, 1916-18
