= York Regiment =

The York Regiment
- Active: 1869–1936
- Country: Canada
- Branch: Canadian Militia
- Type: Line Infantry
- Role: Infantry
- Size: One Regiment
- Part of: Non-Permanent Active Militia
- Garrison/HQ: Fredericton, NB
- Engagements: South African War; First World War
- Battle honours: See #Battle Honours

The York Regiment was an infantry regiment of the Non-Permanent Active Militia of the Canadian Militia (now the Canadian Army). In 1936, the regiment was Amalgamated with The Carleton Light Infantry to form The Carleton and York Regiment.

== Lineage ==
=== The York Regiment ===
- Originated on 10 September 1869, in Fredericton, New Brunswick, as The York Provisional Volunteer Battalion.
- Redesignated on 12 November 1869, as the 71st York Volunteer Battalion.
- Redesignated on 8 May 1900, as the 71st York Regiment.
- Redesignated on 15 March 1920, as The York Regiment.
- Amalgamated on 15 December 1936, with The Carleton Light Infantry and Redesignated as The Carleton and York Regiment.

== Perpetuations ==
- 12th Battalion, CEF
- 140th Battalion (St. John's Tigers), CEF

== History ==
=== The Great War ===
On 6 August 1914, Details of the 71st York Regiment were placed on active service for local protective duty.

On 10 August 1914, the 12th Battalion, CEF was authorized for service and on 30 September 1914, the battalion embarked for Great Britain. On 29 April 1915, the battalion was Redesignated as 12th Reserve Infantry Battalion, CEF and tasked to provide reinforcements for the Canadian Corps in the field. On 30 August 1920, the 12th Battalion, CEF was disbanded.

On 22 December 1915, the 140th Battalion (St. John's Tigers), CEF was authorized for service and on 25 September 1916, the battalion embarked for Great Britain. On 2 November 1916, the battalion's personnel were absorbed by the depots of The Royal Canadian Regiment and the Princess Patricia's Canadian Light Infantry to provide reinforcements for the Canadian Corps in the field. On 27 July 1918, the 140th Battalion, CEF was disbanded.

== Alliances ==
United Kingdom - The East Yorkshire Regiment (The Duke of York's Own) (Until 1936)

== Battle honours ==
=== South African War ===
- South Africa, 1900

=== The Great War ===
- Ypres, 1915, '17 (Note: Selected to be borne on colours and appointments)
- Festubert, 1915
- Mount Sorrel
- Somme, 1916
- Arras, 1917, '18
- Hill 70
- Amiens
- Hindenburg Line
- Pursuit to Mons
