= Saint John Fusiliers =

The Saint John Fusiliers
- Active: 1872–1946
- Country: Canada
- Branch: Canadian Militia (1872–1940); Canadian Army (1940–1946)
- Type: Fusiliers
- Role: Infantry
- Size: One Regiment
- Part of: Non-Permanent Active Militia (1872–1940); Royal Canadian Infantry Corps (1942–1946)
- Garrison/HQ: Saint John, New Brunswick
- Motto: Semper paratus (Latin for 'always ready')
- Engagements: Second Boer War; First World War; Second World War
- Battle honours: See #Battle Honours

The Saint John Fusiliers was an infantry regiment of the Non-Permanent Active Militia of the Canadian Militia (now the Canadian Army). In 1946, the regiment was amalgamated with The New Brunswick Rangers to form the South New Brunswick Regiment which was later renamed as The New Brunswick Scottish. They now form part of the 1st Battalion, The Royal New Brunswick Regiment.

== Lineage ==
=== The Saint John Fusiliers ===
- Originated on 22 March 1872, as the 62nd St. John Battalion of Infantry.
- Redesignated on 14 April 1882 as the 62nd Battalion Saint John Fusiliers.
- Amalgamated on 1 December 1898, with the St. John Rifle Company.
- Redesignated on 8 May 1900, as the 62nd Regiment, St. John Fusiliers.
- Redesignated on 15 March 1920, as The St. John Fusiliers.
- Redesignated on 2 September 1925, as The Saint John Fusiliers.
- Amalgamated on 15 December 1936, with The New Brunswick Dragoons and "A" Company of the 7th Machine Gun Battalion, CMGC and redesignated as The Saint John Fusiliers (Machine Gun).
- Redesignated on 1 January 1941, as the 2nd (Reserve) Battalion, The Saint John Fusiliers (Machine Gun).
- Redesignated again on 1 June 1945, as The Saint John Fusiliers (Machine Gun).
- Amalgamated on 31 August 1946, with The New Brunswick Rangers to form The South New Brunswick Regiment (later The New Brunswick Scottish).

=== St. John Rifle Company ===
- Originated on 8 July 1862, in Saint John, New Brunswick as the Western Militia District Engineer Company.
- Redesignated on 6 February 1869, as The St. John Engineer Company.
- Redesignated on 28 May 1869, as The New Brunswick Engineers Company.
- Converted on 13 January 1882, to Infantry and redesignated as the St. John Rifle Company.
- Amalgamated on 1 December 1898, with the 62nd Battalion Saint John Fusiliers to form an additional infantry company.

=== 7th Machine Gun Battalion, CMGC ===
- Originated on 1 June 1919, in Saint John, New Brunswick as the 7th Machine Gun Brigade, CMGC.
- Redesignated on 15 September 1924, as the 7th Machine Gun Battalion, CMGC.
- Amalgamated on 15 December 1936, with The Saint John Fusiliers and redesignated as The Saint John Fusiliers (Machine Gun). Headquarters and B Company redesignated as The New Brunswick Regiment (Tank) (subsequently disbanded in 1959 as the 64th Light Anti-Aircraft Regiment (New Brunswick Regiment), RCA). C Company was amalgamated with other sub-units and redesignated the 104th Field Battery, RCA (reduced to nil strength and transferred to the Supplementary Order of Battle in 1966).

== Perpetuations ==
- 26th Battalion (New Brunswick), CEF
- 115th Battalion (New Brunswick), CEF

== History ==
=== Early history ===
On 22 March 1872, the 62nd St. John Battalion of Infantry was authorized for service.

On 14 April 1882, the battalion was redesignated as the 62nd Battalion Saint John Fusiliers.

=== South African War and early 1900s ===
During the Boer War, the 62nd St. John Fusiliers contributed volunteers for the various Canadian Contingents serving in South Africa.

On 8 May, 1900, the 62nd Battalion Saint John Fusiliers was reorganized and redesignated as the 62nd Regiment, St. John Fusiliers.

=== Great War ===
On 6 August 1914, Details of the 62nd St. John Fusiliers were placed on active service for local protective duty.

On 7 November 1914, the 26th Battalion, CEF was authorized and on 15 June 1915, the 26th Battalion embarked for Great Britain. On 16 September 1915, the 26th Battalion disembarked in France where it fought as part of the 5th Canadian Infantry Brigade, 2nd Canadian Division on the Western Front until the end of the war. After its return to Canada, on 30 August 1920, the 26th Battalion was disbanded.

On 22 December 1915, the 115th Battalion, CEF was authorized and on 23 July 1916, embarked for the UK. The battalion provided reinforcements for the Canadian Corps in the field until when on 21 October 1916, its personnel were absorbed by the 112th Overseas Battalion, CEF. On 1 September 1917, the 115th Battalion was disbanded.

=== 1920s–1930s ===
On 15 March 1920, as a result of the Otter Commission and the following post-war reorganization of the militia, the 62nd Regiment, St. John Fusiliers was redesignated as The St. John Fusiliers and was reorganized with 2 battalions (1 of them a paper-only reserve battalion) to perpetuate the assigned war-raised battalions of the Canadian Expeditionary Force.

On 2 September 1925, the regiment was redesignated as The Saint John Fusiliers.

On 15 December, 1936, The Saint John Fusiliers were amalgamated with the New Brunswick Dragoons and "A" Company of the 7th Machine Gun Battalion, CMGC, and renamed as The Saint John Fusiliers (Machine Gun) as they were re-tasked as an Infantry Battalion (Machine Gun) as a result of the 1936 Canadian Militia reorganization.

=== Second World War ===
On 26 August 1939, details of The Saint John Fusiliers (Machine Gun) were called out on service, and then on 1 September 1939, they were placed on active service as The Saint John Fusiliers (Machine Gun), CASF, for local protection duties. On 31 December 1940, the details called out on active service were disbanded.

On 1 January 1941, the regiment mobilized the 1st Battalion, The Saint John Fusiliers (Machine Gun), CASF, for active service. The battalion served in Canada in a home defense role as a part of the 18th Canadian Infantry Brigade which was the first part of Pacific Command and then the 6th Canadian Infantry Division.

From 16 August 1943 to 6 January 1944, the Battalion's "C" Company took part in the expedition to Kiska, Alaska as a component of the 13th Canadian Infantry Brigade Group.

On 2 January 1945, the battalion embarked for the UK and upon arrival was disbanded to provide reinforcements to the First Canadian Army on 10 January 1945.

== Organization ==
=== 62nd St. John Battalion of Infantry (22 March 1872) ===
- No. 1 Company (first formed on 14 March, 1860 as the Havelock Rifles)
- No. 2 Company (first formed on 21 March, 1860 as The Queen's Own Rifles)
- No. 3 Company (first formed on 27 June, 1860 as the City Guards, St. John)
- No. 4 Company (first formed on 4 July, 1860 as the St. John Rifles)
- No. 5 Company (first formed on 23 October, 1861 as the Royals)
- No. 6 Company (first formed on 14 March, 1866 as No. 6 Infantry Company, St. John)

=== The St. John Fusiliers (10 January 1921) ===
- 1st Battalion (perpetuating the 26th Battalion, CEF)
- 2nd (Reserve) Battalion (perpetuating the 115th Battalion, CEF)

=== The Saint John Fusiliers (M.G.) (15 December 1936) ===
- Regimental Headquarters (Saint John, New Brunswick)
- A Company (Saint John, New Brunswick)
- B Company (Saint John, New Brunswick)
- C Company (Saint John, New Brunswick)
- D Company (Saint John, New Brunswick)

=== The Saint John Fusiliers (M.G.) (1939) ===
- 1st Battalion (mobilised on 01 January, 1941; demobilised on 10 January, 1945)
- 2nd Battalion (formed in Reserve Army)

== Uniform ==
The dress uniform of the Saint John Fusiliers consisted of a scarlet tunic with blue facings and blue trousers with red piping.

The regimental full dress headdress consisted of a fusilier pattern sealskin cap without a plume. The undress regimental headdress consisted of a blue forage cap.

== Alliances ==
United Kingdom - The King's Own Scottish Borderers (Until 1946)

== Battle honours ==
- South African War
  - South Africa, 1899–1900, 1902
- Great War
  - Mount Sorrel
  - Somme, 1916, '18 (Note: Selected to be borne on colours and appointments)
  - Flers-Courcelette
  - Thiepval
  - Ancre Heights
  - Arras, 1917, '18
  - Vimy, 1917
  - Arleux
  - Scarpe, 1917, '18
  - Hill 70
  - Ypres, 1917
  - Passchendaele
  - Amiens
  - Hindenburg Line
  - Canal du Nord
  - Cambrai, 1918
  - Pursuit to Mons
  - France and Flanders, 1915–18

== Notable members ==
- Major General Hugh Havelock McLean: 17th Lieutenant Governor of New Brunswick
- Surgeon Sylvester Zobieski Earle
