= Carleton and York Regiment =

Infantry regiment of the Canadian Militia

The Carleton and York Regiment
- Active: 1869-1954
- Country: Canada
- Branch: Canadian Militia (1869-1940); Canadian Army (1940-1954)
- Type: Line Infantry
- Role: Infantry
- Size: One Regiment
- Part of: Non-Permanent Active Militia (1869-1940); Royal Canadian Infantry Corps (1942-1954)
- Garrison/HQ: St. Stephen, New Brunswick
- Engagements: Second Boer War; First World War; Second World War
- Battle honours: See #Battle Honours

The Carleton and York Regiment was an infantry regiment of the Non-Permanent Active Militia of the Canadian Militia (now the Canadian Army). In 1954, the regiment was amalgamated with The New Brunswick Scottish and The North Shore (New Brunswick) Regiment to form the two battalions of The New Brunswick Regiment (later renamed as The Royal New Brunswick Regiment).

== Lineage ==
=== The Carleton and York Regiment ===
- Originated on 10 September 1869, in Woodstock, New Brunswick, as The Carleton Light Infantry.
- Redesignated on 5 November 1869, as the 67th The Carleton Light Infantry.
- Redesignated on 8 May 1900, as the 67th Regiment Carleton Light Infantry.
- Redesignated on 15 March 1920, as The Carleton Light Infantry.
- Amalgamated on 15 December 1936, with The York Regiment and redesignated as The Carleton and York Regiment.
- Redesignated on 7 November 1940, as the 2nd (Reserve) Battalion, The Carleton and York Regiment.
- Redesignated on 1 November 1945, as The Carleton and York Regiment.
- Amalgamated on 31 October 1954, with The New Brunswick Scottish and redesignated as the 1st Battalion, The New Brunswick Regiment (Carleton and York).
- Redesignated on 18 May 1956, as The Royal New Brunswick Regiment.

=== The York Regiment ===
- Originated on 10 September 1869, in Fredericton, New Brunswick, as The York Provisional Volunteer Battalion.
- Redesignated on 12 November 1869, as the 71st York Volunteer Battalion.
- Redesignated on 8 May 1900, as the 71st York Regiment.
- Redesignated on 15 March 1920, as The York Regiment.
- Amalgamated on 15 December 1936, with The Carleton Light Infantry.

== Perpetuations ==
- 12th Battalion, CEF
- 44th Battalion, CEF
- 104th Battalion, CEF
- 140th Battalion (St. John's Tigers), CEF

== History ==
=== Formation ===
As a result of the 1936 Canadian Militia reorganization, The Carleton and York Regiment was formed in St. Stephen by the amalgamation of The Carleton Light Infantry and The York Regiment.

=== Second World War ===
==== Europe ====
On 1 September 1939, The Carleton and York Regiment mobilized The Carleton and York Regiment, CASF for active service. The battalion was later on 7 November 1940, redesignated as the 1st Battalion, The Carleton and York Regiment, CASF and on 9 December 1939, the battalion Embarked for Great Britain as part of the 3rd Canadian Infantry Brigade, 1st Canadian Infantry Division.

After serving in the UK on anti-invasion duties, on 10 July 1943, the battalion landed in Sicily as part of Operation Husky where it fought for 38 days. The battalion would then on 3 September 1943, take part in the invasion of Italy and would serve with the rest of the I Canadian Corps in the Italian Campaign.

On 16 March 1945, the battalion along with the rest of the I Canadian Corps moved to North-West Europe as part of Operation Goldflake, and where, upon arrival, the battalion fought until the end of the war.

On 30 September 1945, the overseas battalion of The Carleton and York Regiment was disbanded.

==== Pacific ====
On 1 June 1945, a second CASF component of the regiment was mobilized for service in the Pacific theatre of operations with the re-raised 6th Canadian Infantry Division (Canadian Army Pacific Force) for service as part of the proposed Commonwealth Corps for the planned Invasion of Japan. This unit was designated as the 2nd Canadian Infantry Battalion, (The Carleton and York Regiment), CASF. On 1 November 1945, the battalion was disbanded.

=== Post War ===
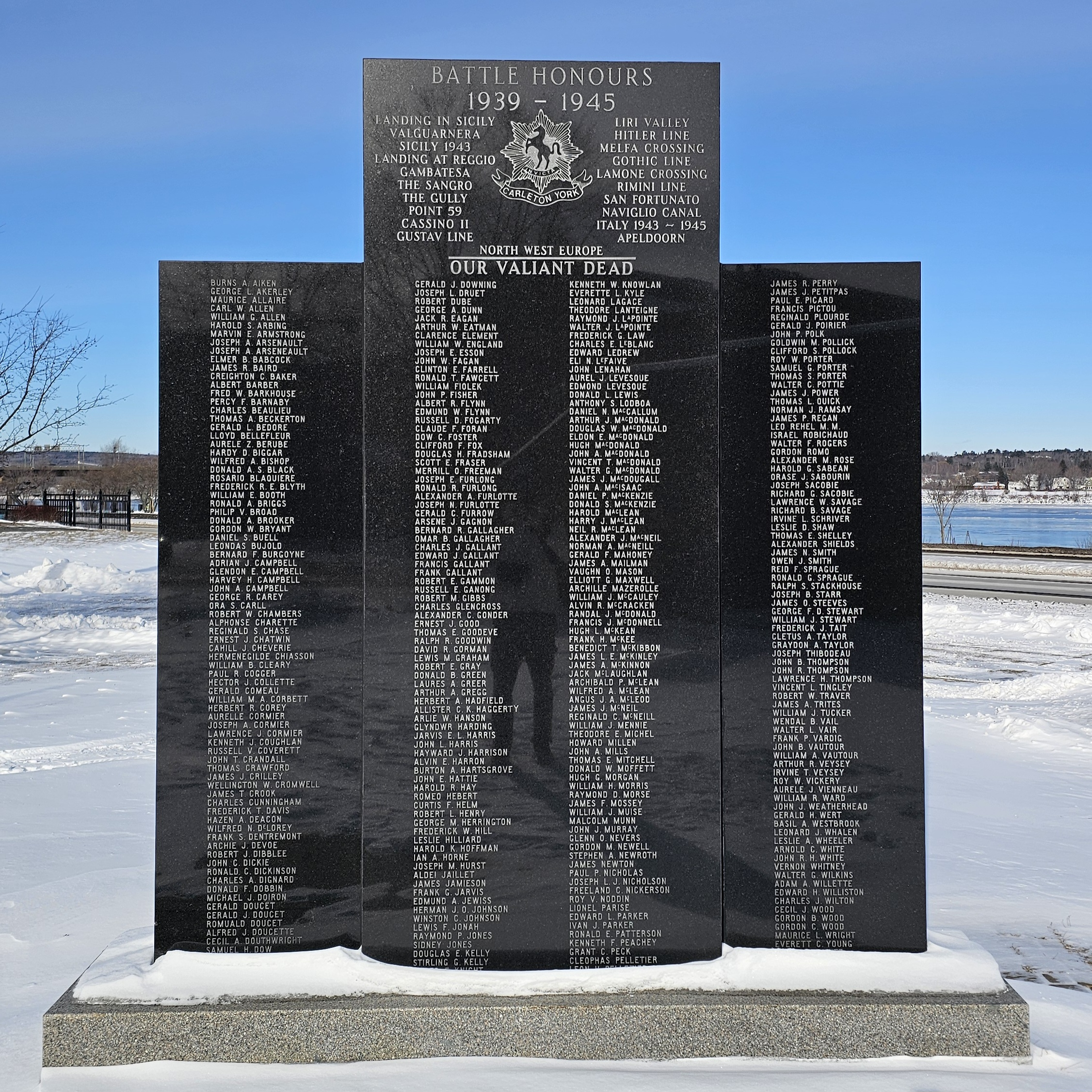
The Carleton and York Regiment Memorial in Fredericton

On 4 May 1951, The Carleton and York Regiment mobilized two temporary Active Force / Regular Force companies designated "E" and "F" Companies respectively.

"E" Company was reduced to nil strength upon its personnel being incorporated into the 1st Canadian Infantry Battalion (later the 3rd Battalion, The Canadian Guards) for service in Germany with the North Atlantic Treaty Organization as part of the 27th Canadian Infantry Brigade. On 29 July 1953, the company was disbanded.

"F" Company was initially used as a reinforcement pool for "E" Company. On 15 May 1952, the company was reduced to nil strength, upon its personnel being absorbed by the newly formed 2nd Canadian Infantry Battalion (later the 4th Battalion, The Canadian Guards) for service in Korea with the United Nations as part of the 25th Canadian Infantry Brigade. On 29 July 1953, the company was disbanded.

=== Amalgamation ===
As a result of the Kennedy Report on the Reserve Army, on 31 October 1954, The Carleton and York Regiment was amalgamated along with The New Brunswick Scottish and The North Shore (New Brunswick) Regiment to form The New Brunswick Regiment (later redesignated as The Royal New Brunswick Regiment). The Carleton and York Regiment along with The New Brunswick Scottish would form the 1st Battalion, The New Brunswick Regiment (Carleton and York) and The North Shore (New Brunswick) Regiment would form the 2nd Battalion, The New Brunswick Regiment (North Shore) from 1954 until 2012 when it was reorganized once again as a separate infantry regiment.

== Organization ==
=== The Carleton and York Regiment (15 December 1936) ===
- Regimental Headquarters (St. Stephen, New Brunswick)
- HQ Company (Woodstock, NB)
- A Company (Fredericton, NB)
- B Company (Woodstock, NB)
- C Company (St. Stephen, NB)
- D Company (Edmundston, NB)

== Alliances ==
- United Kingdom - The East Yorkshire Regiment (The Duke of York's Own) (1936-1954)
- United Kingdom - The Queen's Own Royal West Kent Regiment (1936-1954)

== Battle honours ==
=== South African War ===
- South Africa, 1900

=== The Great War ===
- Ypres, 1915, '17
- Festubert, 1915
- Mount Sorrel
- Somme, 1916, ‘18
- Ancre Heights
- Ancre, 1916
- Arras, 1917, ‘18
- Vimy, 1917
- Hill 70
- Passchendaele
- Amiens
- Scarpe, 1918
- Drocourt-Quéant
- Hindenburg Line
- Canal du Nord
- Valenciennes
- France and Flanders, 1916-18

=== The Second World War ===
- Landing in Sicily
- Valguarnera
- Sicily, 1943
- Landing at Reggio
- Gambatesa
- The Sangro
- The Gully
- Point 59
- Cassino II
- Gustav Line
- Liri Valley
- Hitler Line
- Melfa Crossing
- Gothic Line
- Lamone Crossing
- Rimini Line
- San Fortunato
- Naviglio Canal
- Italy, 1943–1945
- Apeldoorn
- North-West Europe, 1945

== Notable members ==
- Major-General Hardy N. Ganong CBE VD ED
- Major Rowland Frazee, CC
