= Royal New Brunswick Regiment =

The Royal New Brunswick Regiment (Carleton & York)
- Regimental badge
- Active: 1954 – present
- Country: Canada
- Branch: Canadian Army
- Type: Line infantry
- Role: Light infantry
- Size: One battalion
- Part of: 37 Canadian Brigade Group
- Headquarters: Fredericton
- Motto: Spem reduxit (Latin for 'Hope restored')
- March: "A Hundred Pipers"
- Engagements: War in Afghanistan
- Battle honours: See § Battle honours
- Website: www.canada.ca/en/army/corporate/5-canadian-division/the-royal-new-brunswick-regiment.html

The Royal New Brunswick Regiment (Carleton & York) (RNBR) is a reserve infantry regiment of the Canadian Army based in New Brunswick. It was formed in 1954 by amalgamation of the Carleton and York Regiment, the New Brunswick Scottish and the North Shore (New Brunswick) Regiment as the New Brunswick Regiment. The "Royal" designation was added in 1956. The Royal New Brunswick Regiment is part of 37 Canadian Brigade Group, 5th Canadian Division. The RNBR holds 65 battle honours, mostly by perpetuation of the regiments it was formed from.

== Creation ==
The regiment was formed in 1954 by the amalgamation of the Carleton and York Regiment, the New Brunswick Scottish and the North Shore (New Brunswick) Regiment. From 1954 to 2012, it consisted of two battalions with the former the Carleton and York Regiment and the New Brunswick Scottish forming the 1st Battalion and the North Shore Regiment forming the 2nd Battalion. However, in 2012, the 2nd Battalion was once again reorganized as a distinct regiment, the North Shore (New Brunswick) Regiment.

== Present structure ==
As of 2025, the regiment's headquarters is in Fredericton. "A" Company is in Edmundston and "B" Company is in Fredericton. The Administration and Headquarters Company is also in Fredericton, with a platoon in Saint John.

== Lineage ==
Pre-2024 regimental colour

- The Carleton Light Infantry was formed in 1869, merging with the York Regiment in 1936 to become the Carleton and York Regiment which in turn amalgamated with the New Brunswick Scottish and becoming the '1st Battalion, The New Brunswick Regiment (Carleton and York)'.
- The York Regiment was formed on 31 August 1946 on the amalgamation of the New Brunswick Rangers and the Saint John Fusiliers (Machine Gun) as the South New Brunswick Regiment, becoming the New Brunswick Scottish on 2 December 1946.
- The New Brunswick Dragoons had amalgamated with Saint John Jusilers in December 1936.
- 7th Machine Gun Battalion, Canadian Machine Gun Corps was formed 1 June 1919 in Saint John, A Company amalgamated on 15 December 1936 with the Saint John Fusiliers.

=== Charts ===
Lineage chart, 1860–1914

1860	Independent infy coys
1862	Western Militia District Engineer Coy
1869	The Carleton Light Infy	The York Provisional Volunteer Bn	The St. John Engineer Coy
1869	67th The Carleton Light Infy	71st "York" Volunteer Bn	The NB Engineers Coy
1870	74th Bn of Infy
1872	62nd "St. John" Bn of Infy
1882	62nd Bn "Saint John Fusiliers"	St. John Rifle Coy
1898	62nd Bn "Saint John Fusiliers"
1900	67th Regt "Carleton Light Infy"	71st York Regt	74th Regt	62nd Regt "St. John Fusiliers"
1903	74th Regt "The Brunswick Rangers"
1911	28th "NB" Dragoons

Lineage chart, 1914–1936

67th Regt "Carleton Light Infy"	71st York Regt	74th Regt "The Brunswick Rangers"	62nd Regt "St. John Fusiliers"	28th "NB" Dragoons
1914	12th Bn, CEF	55th Bn, CEF	26th Bn, CEF
1915	104th "Overseas" Bn, CEF	12th Reserve Infy Bn, CEF	140th "Overseas" Bn, CEF	145th "Overseas" Bn, CEF	115th "Overseas" Bn, CEF
1916	Absorbed by depots of The RCR and PPCLI	Absorbed by 40th "Overseas" Bn	Absorbed by 9th Reserve Bn	236th "Overseas" Bn	Absorbed by 112th "Overseas" Bn
1917	Absorbed by 105th "Overseas" Bn
1918	Absorbed by 20th Reserve Bn
1919	7th MG Bde, CMGC
1920	Disbanded	Disbanded
1920	1st Bn (44th Bn, CEF), The Carleton Light Infy	2nd Bn (104th Bn, CEF), (Note: Reserve) The Carleton Light Infy	1st Bn (12th Bn, CEF), The York Regt	2nd Bn (140th Bn, CEF), The York Regt	1st Bn (55th Bn, CEF), The NB Rangers	2nd Bn (145th Bn, CEF), The NB Rangers	3rd Bn (236th Bn, CEF), The NB Rangers	1st Bn (26th Bn, CEF), The St. John Fusiliers	2nd Bn (115th Bn, CEF), The St. John Fusiliers	1st Regt, The NB Dragoons
1924	7th MG Bn, CMGC
1925	1st Bn (26th Bn, CEF), The Saint John Fusiliers	2nd Bn (115th Bn, CEF), The Saint John Fusiliers
1936	Disbanded	Disbanded	Disbanded	Disbanded	Disbanded
1936	The Carleton and York Regt	The NB Rangers	The Saint John Fusiliers (MG)

Lineage chart, 1936–present

The Carleton and York Regt	The NB Rangers	The Saint John Fusiliers (MG)
1939	The Carleton and York Regt, CASF
1940	1st Bn, The Carleton and York Regt, CASF	2nd (Reserve) Bn, The Carleton and York Regt
1941	1st Bn, The NB Rangers, CASF	2nd (Reserve) Bn, The NB Rangers	1st Bn, The Saint John Fusiliers (MG), CASF	2nd (Reserve) Bn, The Saint John Fusiliers (MG)
1943	The 10th Canadian Infy Bde Support Group (The NB Rangers), CIC, CASF
1944	The 10th Independent MG Coy (The NB Rangers), CIC, CASF
1945	2nd Canadian Infy Bn (The Carleton and York Regt), CASF	Disbanded	The Saint John Fusiliers (MG)
1945	Disbanded	Disbanded	The Carleton and York Regt
1946	Disbanded	The NB Rangers
1946	The South NB Regt
1946	The NB Scottish
1951	"E" Coy, (Note: Regular Force) The Carleton and York Regt	"F" Coy, The Carleton and York Regt
1951	Absorbed by 1st Canadian Infy Bn
1952	Absorbed by 2nd Canadian Infy Bn
1954	1st Bn, The NB Regt (Carleton and York)
1956	1st Bn, The Royal NB Regt (Carleton and York)
2012	The Royal NB Regt
2014	The Royal NB Regt (Carleton & York)

== Perpetuations ==
=== War of 1812 ===
- 1st Battalion, Northumberland County Regiment
- 2nd Battalion, Northumberland County Regiment
- 3rd Battalion, Northumberland County Regiment
- 1st Battalion, Saint John County Regiment
- 1st Battalion, York County Regiment
- 2nd Battalion, York County Regiment

The regiment also carries two battle honours from the War of 1812 in commemoration of the New Brunswick Fencible Infantry (104th Regiment of Foot) which was recruited in New Brunswick and served during that conflict.

=== Great War ===
- 12th Battalion, CEF
- 26th Battalion (New Brunswick), CEF
- 55th Battalion (New Brunswick & Prince Edward Island), CEF
- 104th Battalion, CEF
- 115th Battalion (New Brunswick), CEF
- 140th Battalion (St. John's Tigers), CEF
- 145th Battalion (New Brunswick), CEF
- 236th Battalion (New Brunswick Kilties), CEF
- 28th Field Battery, Canadian Field Artillery, CEF.

== Operational history ==
=== War in Afghanistan ===
The regiment contributed an aggregate of more than 20% of its authorized strength to the various Task Forces which served in Afghanistan between 2002 and 2014.

== Battle honours ==
Pre-2024 regimental colour

In the list below, battle honours in capitals were awarded for participation in large operations and campaigns, while those in lowercase indicate honours granted for more specific battles. Those battle honours written in bold are emblazoned on the regimental colour.

On October 5, 2024, Brenda Murphy, Lieutenant Governor of New Brunswick, presented a new stand of colours to the regiment. This was the first time the regiment's honours for the War of 1812 and Afghanistan were included.

=== War of 1812 ===
- **Defence of Canada – 1812–1815 – Défense du Canada**
- **Niagara**

The non-emblazonable honorary distinction Defence of Canada – 1812–1815 – Défense du Canada (partly awarded in commemoration of the New Brunswick Fencibles).

=== South African War ===
South Africa, 1899–1902

=== Great War ===
- **Ypres, 1915, '17**
- Festubert, 1915
- Mount Sorrel
- **Somme, 1916, '18**
- Flers-Courcelette
- Thiepval
- **Ancre Heights**
- Ancre, 1916
- Arras, 1917, '18
- **Vimy, 1917**
- Arleux
- Scarpe, 1917, '18
- **Hill 70**
- **Passchendaele**
- Amiens
- Drocourt-Quéant
- **Hindenburg Line**
- **Canal du Nord**
- Cambrai, 1918
- Valenciennes
- **France and Flanders, 1915–18**

=== Second World War ===
- **Landing in Sicily**
- Valguarnera
- Sicily, 1943
- Landing at Reggio
- Gambatesa
- The Sangro
- **The Gully**
- Point 59
- **Cassino II**
- Gustav Line
- Liri Valley
- **Hitler Line**
- Melfa Crossing
- **Gothic Line**
- Lamone Crossing
- Rimini Line
- San Fortunato
- Naviglio Canal
- **Italy, 1943–1945**
- **Falaise**
- Falaise Road
- The Laison
- Chambois
- The Seine, 1944
- Moerbrugge
- Moerkerke
- **The Scheldt**
- Breskens Pocket
- The Lower Maas
- Kapelsche Veer
- The Rhineland
- **The Rhine**
- Apeldoorn
- Küsten Canal
- Bad Zwischenahn
- **North-West Europe, 1944–1945**

=== War in Afghanistan ===
Afghanistan

== Armouries ==
The regiment has two armouries:

The Carlton Street Armoury, Carlton Street Fredericton, New Brunswick housed the 1st Battalion, the Royal New Brunswick Regiment (Carlton and York). A centrally located drill hall, it houses 333 Royal Canadian Air Cadets, 242 Fredericton Royal Canadian Army Cadet Corps and 130 Royal Canadian Sea Cadet Corps.

The second is the Lieutenant Colonel William (Billy) Mulherin Armoury, on Madawaska Road, Grand Falls, New Brunswick. It houses C Company, 1st Battalion, the Royal New Brunswick Regiment, and 314 Squadron Air Cadets.

== Alliances ==
- United Kingdom - The Royal Scots Borderers
- United Kingdom - The Princess of Wales's Royal Regiment (Queen's and Royal Hampshires)
- United Kingdom - The Royal Yorkshire Regiment (14th/15th, 19th and 33rd/76th Foot)

== See also ==
- List of armouries in Canada
- Military history of Canada
- History of the Canadian Army
- Canadian Forces
- The Canadian Crown and the Canadian Forces
- List of Canadian organizations with royal patronage

== Books ==
- "Royal New Brunswick Regiment: 1949-1958" New Brunswick Regiment (Carleton and York), 1st.; Hobson & Sons (London) Ltd.; Canada. (1949 Oct. 31 - 1958 Nov. 5.)

Preceded by The Princess Louise Fusiliers	The Royal New Brunswick Regiment	Succeeded by The West Nova Scotia Regiment
