= Halifax Rifles (RCAC) =

The Halifax Rifles (RCAC)
- Active: 1860–1965, 2009–present
- Country: Nova Scotia 1860–1867; Canada 1867–present
- Branch: Canadian Forces Primary Reserve
- Type: Cavalry
- Role: Armoured reconnaissance; Influence activities including psychological operations and civil-military co-operation
- Part of: Royal Canadian Armoured Corps
- Garrison/HQ: Willow Park Armoury, Halifax, Nova Scotia
- Motto: Cede nullis (Latin for 'Yield to none')
- March: "Huntsman's Chorus"
- Engagements: Fenian Raids; North-West Rebellion; Second Boer War; First World War; Second World War; War in Afghanistan
- Battle honours: See #Battle honours

Insignia
- NATO Map Symbol

The Halifax Rifles (RCAC) is a Canadian Army regiment that served between the years of 1860 and 1965 before being reduced to nil strength and placed on the Supplementary Order of Battle. The regiment was reactivated on May 10, 2009, as a reserve force unit performing the role of armoured reconnaissance. It is the first and only regiment since the 1960s to be reactivated from the Supplementary Order of Battle.

The unit draws its history from the 19th century Halifax Volunteer Battalion which was active at the time of the Fenian Raids. It received its current name in May 1958.

== History ==
=== Fenian Raids ===
Regimental camp flag

The Halifax Volunteer Battalion was called out on active service on 6 June 1866. The battalion, which guarded the Halifax Dockyard, was removed from active service on 31 July 1866.

=== North West Rebellion ===
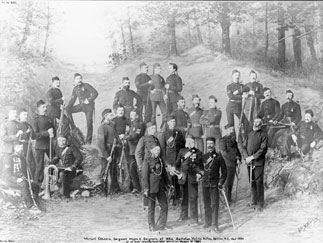
Non commissioned members of the 63rd The Halifax Battalion of Rifles ca. 1890, several of them wearing medals from the North-West Rebellion

The 63rd The Halifax Battalion of Rifles mobilized three companies for active service on 10 April 1885 which served with the Halifax Provisional Battalion in the Alberta Column of the North-West Field Force. The companies were removed from active service on 24 July 1885.

=== South African War ===
The 63rd The Halifax Battalion of Rifles contributed volunteers for the Canadian Contingents during the South African War.

=== Great War ===
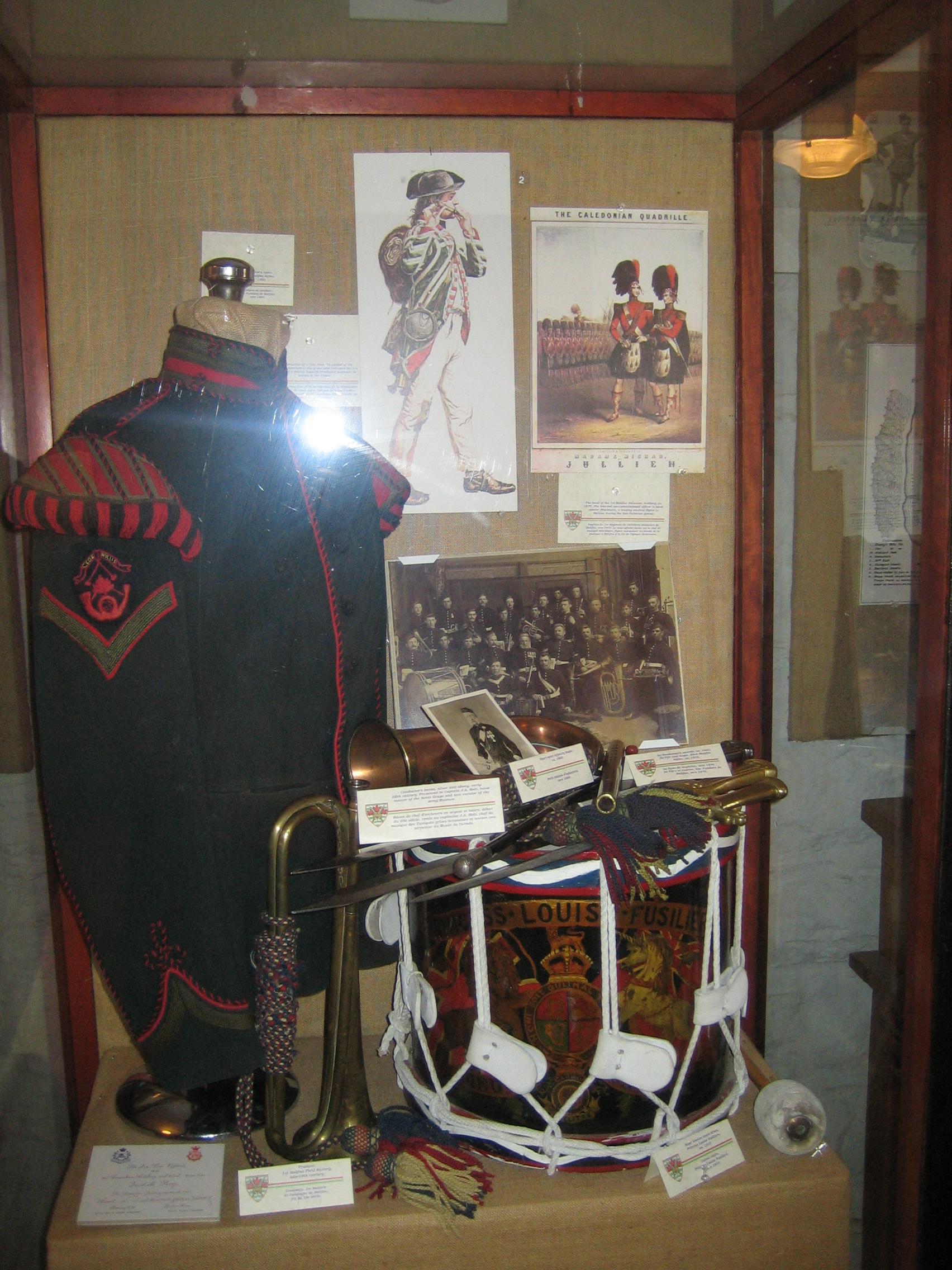
The uniform and drums of a bugler with the regimental band of the Halifax Rifles in the Army Museum of the Halifax Citadel.

Details of the 63rd Regiment "Halifax Rifles" were placed on active service on 6 August 1914 for local protective duty.

The 40th Battalion (Nova Scotia), CEF, was authorized on 7 November 1914 and embarked for Britain on 18 October 1915. The battalion provided reinforcements to the Canadian Corps in the field until 4 January 1917, when its personnel were absorbed by the 26th Reserve Battalion, CEF. The battalion was disbanded on 17 July 1917.

=== Second World War ===
Details from the regiment were called out on service on 26 August 1939 and then placed on active service on 1 September 1939 as The Halifax Rifles, CASF (Details), for local protection duties. which were disbanded on 31 December 1940. The regiment mobilized the 1st Battalion, The Halifax Rifles, CASF for active service on 1 January 1941. It was converted to armour and redesignated as the 23rd Army Tank Battalion (The Halifax Rifles), CAC, CASF, on 26 January 1942 and the 23rd Army Tank Regiment (The Halifax Rifles), CAC, CASF, on 15 May 1942. It embarked for Britain on 17 June 1943 as a unit of the 2nd Army Tank Brigade, 4th Canadian Armoured Division, where it provided reinforcements to units of the Canadian Corps in the field. The overseas regiment was disbanded on 1 November 1943.

=== War in Afghanistan ===
The regiment contributed personnel to the various task forces which served in Afghanistan between 2009 and 2014.

=== Mission task ===
Since 2015, Army Reserve units have been assigned specific mission tasks, in addition to traditional military duties. Trained and promoted in the traditional officer and non-commissioned member streams of the Royal Canadian Armoured Corps, regiment members are additionally trained to be fully integrated, as a formed entity, into similarly assigned Regular Force units. The mission task for the Halifax Rifles is called Influence Activities. By their Canadian Forces organization order (CFOO), a squadron of up to 52 members will be trained in the employment of population group influence techniques, including psychological operations and civil-military co-operation, to provide behavioural and psychological effects on those populations in support of a commander's intent or mission.

== Lineage ==
=== The Halifax Rifles (RCAC) ===
- Originated 14 May 1860 in Halifax, Nova Scotia as the Halifax Volunteer Battalion
- Redesignated 28 May 1869 as the Halifax Volunteer Battalion of Rifles
- Redesignated 5 November 1869 as the 63rd The Halifax Volunteer Battalion of Rifles
- Redesignated 13 May 1870 as the 63rd The Halifax Battalion of Rifles
- Redesignated 8 May 1900 as the 63rd Regiment "Halifax Rifles"
- Redesignated 15 May 1920 as The Halifax Rifles
- Redesignated 1 January 1941 as the 2nd (Reserve) Battalion, The Halifax Rifles
- Redesignated 15 September 1944 as The Halifax Rifles (Reserve)
- Redesignated 30 November 1945 as The Halifax Rifles
- 1 April 1946 converted to armour and redesignated as the 23rd Armoured Regiment (Halifax Rifles), RCAC'
- Redesignated 4 February 1949 as The Halifax Rifles (23rd Armoured Regiment)
- Redesignated 19 May 1958 The Halifax Rifles (RCAC)
- Reduced to nil strength and transferred to the Supplementary Order of Battle on 31 January 1965
- Removed from the Supplementary Order of Battle and reactivated as a Canadian Army Reserve Force regiment on 28 July 2009

=== Lineage chart ===
Lineage chart

1859	Independent rifle coys
1860	Halifax Volunteer Bn
1869	Halifax Volunteer Bn of Rifles
1869	63rd The Halifax Volunteer Bn of Rifles
1870	63rd The Halifax Bn of Rifles
1885	Halifax Provisional Bn
1885	Disbanded
1900	63rd Regt "Halifax Rifles"
1914	40th Bn, CEF
1917	Absorbed by 26th Reserve Bn
1920	1st Bn (40th Bn, CEF), The Halifax Rifles	2nd Bn, (Note: Reserve order of battle) The Halifax Rifles
1936	The Halifax Rifles	Disbanded
1941	1st Bn, The Halifax Rifles, CASF	2nd (Reserve) Bn, The Halifax Rifles
1942	23rd Army Tank Bn (The Halifax Rifles), CAC, CASF
1942	23rd Army Tank Regt (The Halifax Rifles), CAC, CASF
1943	Disbanded
1944	The Halifax Rifles (Reserve)
1945	The Halifax Rifles
1946	23rd Armd Regt (Halifax Rifles), RCAC
1949	The Halifax Rifles (23rd Armd Regt)
1958	The Halifax Rifles (RCAC)
1965	Supplementary Order of Battle
2009	Primary Reserve

== Perpetuations ==
=== Great War ===
- 40th Battalion (Nova Scotia), CEF

== Alliances ==
- United Kingdom - None at present

== Battle honours ==
The guidon of The Halifax Rifles (RCAC).

In the list below, battle honours in capitals were awarded for participation in large operations and campaigns, while those in lowercase indicate honours granted for more specific battles.

=== War of 1812 ===
- Honorary distinction: The non-emblazonable honorary distinction DEFENCE OF CANADA – 1812–1815 – DÉFENSE DU CANADA (awarded in commemoration of the Nova Scotia Fencible Infantry).

=== North West Rebellion ===
- NORTH WEST CANADA, 1885 (Note: Emblazoned on the guidon)

=== South African War ===
- SOUTH AFRICA, 1899–1900

=== Great War ===
- MOUNT SORREL 2–13 June 1916
- SOMME, 1916 1 July–18 November 1916
- ARRAS, 1917, '18 8 April–4 May 1917 and 26 August–3 September 1918
- YPRES, 1917 31 July–10 November 1917
- HILL 70 15–25 August 1917
- AMIENS 8–11 August 1918
- HINDENBURG LINE 12 September–9 October 1918
- PURSUIT TO MONS 28 September–11 November 1918

== See also ==
- Military history of Nova Scotia

== Order of precedence ==
Preceded by The Governor General's Horse Guards	The Halifax Rifles (RCAC)	Succeeded by 8th Canadian Hussars (Princess Louise's)

== Notes and references ==
- Canadian Forces Publication A-DH-267-003 Insignia and Lineages of the Canadian Forces. Volume 3: Combat Arms Regiments.
