= 44th Battalion (Manitoba), CEF =

Canadian WWI infantry battalion

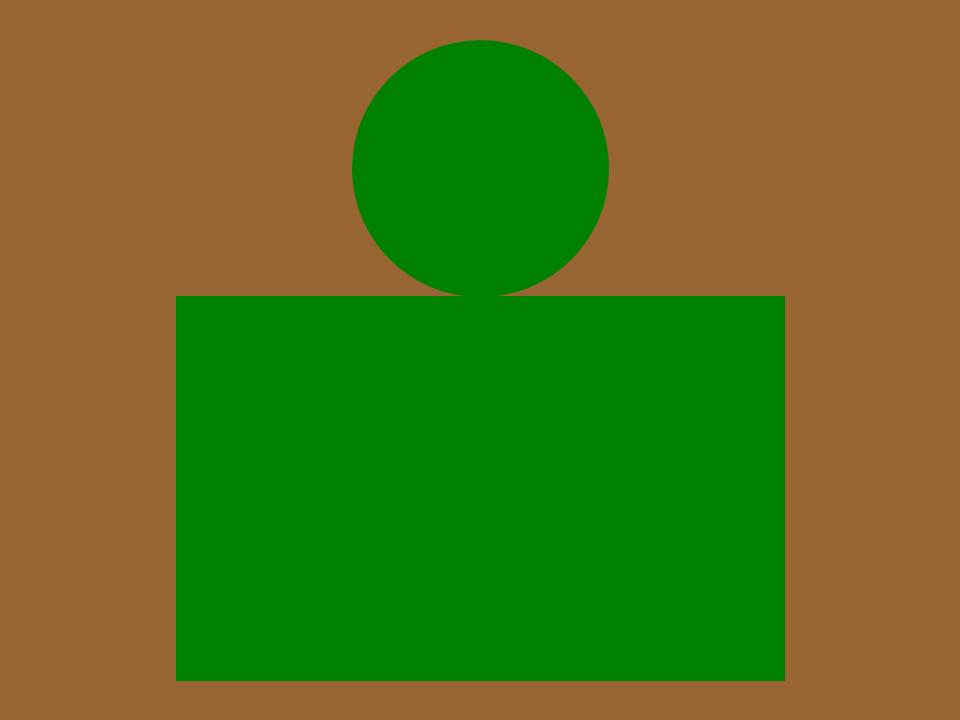
The distinguishing patch of the 44th Battalion (Manitoba), CEF.

The 44th Battalion (Manitoba), CEF, was an infantry battalion of the Canadian Expeditionary Force during World War I.

== History ==
The 44th Battalion was authorized on 7 November 1914 and embarked for Great Britain on 23 October 1915. It disembarked in France on 12 August 1916, where it fought as part of the 10th Canadian Brigade, 4th Canadian Division, in France and Flanders until the end of the war. The battalion was disbanded on 15 September 1920.

In August 1918, the 44th Battalion was renamed the 44th Battalion (New Brunswick), CEF.

The 44th Battalion recruited in and was mobilized at Winnipeg, Manitoba. The 44th Battalion had three officers commanding:

- Lt-Col. E.R. Wayland, 22 October 1915 – 11 December 1915
- Lt.-Col. J.H. Sills, 27 December 1915 – 16 January 1917
- Lt.-Col. R.D. Davies, DSO, 22 January 1917 – demobilization

== Battle honours ==
The 44th Battalion was awarded the following battle honours:

- Somme, 1916
- Ancre Heights
- Ancre, 1916
- Arras, 1917, '18
- Vimy, 1917
- Hill 70
- Ypres 1917
- Passchendaele
- Amiens
- Scarpe 1918
- Drocourt-Quéant
- Hindenburg Line
- Canal du Nord
- Valenciennes
- France and Flanders, 1916-18

== Perpetuation ==
In 1920 the perpetuation of the 44th Battalion was assigned to the Carleton Light Infantry, which held it until 1936. The perpetuation then passed to the Carleton and York Regiment (1936–1954), the New Brunswick Regiment (1954–1956) and the Royal New Brunswick Regiment from 1956.

The perpetuation was transferred to the Royal Winnipeg Rifles on 11 September 1969.

== See also ==
- List of infantry battalions in the Canadian Expeditionary Force

== Sources ==
- Canadian Expeditionary Force 1914-1919 by Col. G.W.L. Nicholson, CD, Queen's Printer, Ottawa, Ontario, 1962
