= 2nd Canadian Infantry Battalion =

2nd Canadian Infantry Battalion can refer to:

Units of the Canadian Army Pacific Force in 1945:

- 2nd Canadian Infantry Battalion (The Hastings and Prince Edward Regiment), 1st Canadian Infantry Regiment
- 2nd Canadian Infantry Battalion (The Seaforth Highlanders of Canada), 2nd Canadian Infantry Regiment
- 2nd Canadian Infantry Battalion (The Carleton and York Regiment), 3rd Canadian Infantry Regiment

Unit of the Korean War:

- 2nd Canadian Infantry Battalion, created in 1952 and in 1953 became 4th Battalion, The Canadian Guards
