= William Teel Baird =

- Born: c. 1819; Fredericton, New Brunswick
- Died: February 23, 1897 (aged 77–78); Woodstock, New Brunswick
- Relatives: John Baird, father
- Military career
- Allegiance: Canada
- Branch: Canadian Militia
- Rank: Lieutenant Colonel
- Commands: 67th Battalion, The Carleton Light Infantry; Quartermaster General
- Conflicts: Fenian Raids
- Other work: Pharmacist, office holder, and author

William Teel Baird (c. 1819 – February 23, 1897) was a Canadian military figure of the 19th century.

== Biography ==
Baird was born on the upper Saint John River in New Brunswick where his father, John Baird, was a school teacher. The younger Baird was trained as a pharmacist and in 1839 he moved to Woodstock to open his own business. There he explored his many interests including music and books. His first interest was the militia, which he had joined in Fredericton, New Brunswick in 1836, and he continued with this pursuit in his new home.

Baird made large contributions to the militia in the province beginning in 1861 and the Trent Affair where he organized the militia to thwart British troop desertions. Under instructions from Lieutenant Governor Arthur Hamilton Gordon, he organized the Home Guard during the time of the threat of Fenian raids. In 1869 when the New Brunswick Militia units were restructured into the new post-confederation Canadian Militia, Baird became the first commanding officer of the newly formed 67th Battalion, The Carleton Light Infantry. He retired as a Quartermaster General.

William Teel Baird's other noteworthy contribution to history was his autobiography, Seventy years of New Brunswick life, which gives a particular insight into the militia and the political climate of the times.
