= John Baird (educator) =

John Baird (1795–1858) was born and educated in Graffa, Ireland. He was a son of William Baird and Susan Teel. He was recruited there by the British Army as a teacher.

== Early life ==
He got education at Graffa and later in the town of Monaghan. Then he entered the Seminary for School Masters in County Kildare.

== Career ==
In 1817 the 74th Foot was stationed in the county and their commander, Colonel Sir Robert Trench, visited the seminary in search for the student teachers to join his regiment, which sailed for British North America. Baird agreed and was supposed to serve for seven years as a teacher. He got the pay and rank of a sergeant, and after expiring of his term he would get a crown land.

In 1818 they were stationed in Fredericton, New Brunswick where he would teach the children of the regiment and the poor and black of the area. In 1823 he was released from the army and his family and other disbanded soldiers took up army granted land in the parish of Kent. Bairdsville was founded around this time by relatives of his from Ireland. He farmed and taught school there for 2 years, till 1825.

In 1825, Baird became part of Lieutenant Governor George Stracey Smyth's Madras school system which provided education for the poor children of the province. He was one of the pioneer teachers who helped provide an education to the poor at a time when few such opportunities existed.

In February 1836 his wife and two daughters died because of consumption and after their death the members of the Madras School Board expressed some dissatisfaction with the way the school was being operated.

In May 1839 Baird was replaced from his position. In 1841 he left Fredericton and moved to land he had purchased near Tobique. He died there in 1858.

== Private life ==
He got married on 30 March 1817 with Annie Diggin (1798–1836) of Dublin, and they had two sons and two daughters, including William Teel Baird, military officer and author. He married for the second time in 1836, and by that marriage had six children.
