= Hugh Havelock McLean =

Canadian politician

The Honourable Hugh Havelock MacLean
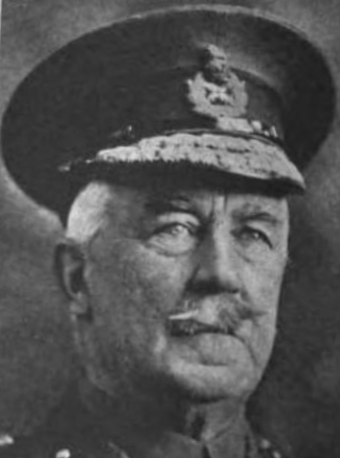

Member of the Canadian Parliament for Sunbury—Queen's
- In office 1908–1917
- Preceded by: Robert Duncan Wilmot
- Succeeded by: District abolished (1914)

Member of the Canadian Parliament for Royal
- In office 1917–1921
- Preceded by: District established (1914)
- Succeeded by: George Burpee Jones

17th Lieutenant Governor of New Brunswick
- In office 28 December 1928 – 31 January 1935
- Monarch: George V
- Governors General: The Earl of Willingdon; The Earl of Bessborough
- Premier: John B. M. Baxter; Charles D. Richards; Leonard P. D. Tilley
- Preceded by: William Frederick Todd
- Succeeded by: Murray MacLaren

Personal details
- Born: 3 March 1854 Fredericton, New Brunswick
- Died: 22 November 1938 (aged 84) Saint John, New Brunswick, Canada
- Party: Liberal

Military service
- Branch/service: General Officer Commanding New Brunswick Troops
- Rank: Major General

Hugh Havelock MacLean (3 March 1854 – 22 November 1938) was a Canadian soldier, politician, and the 17th Lieutenant Governor of New Brunswick from 1928 to 1935.

== Biography ==
Born in Fredericton, New Brunswick, the son of Lauchlan and Sophia LeBrun Duplissie (Marsh) McLean, McLean was educated at the Fredericton Grammar School. He was called to the New Brunswick Bar in 1875 and created a King's Counsel in 1899. He was elected to the House of Commons of Canada for the New Brunswick electoral district of Sunbury—Queen's in the 1908 federal election. A Liberal, he was re-elected in the 1911 federal election and the 1917 federal election for the electoral district of Royal. In 1917, he crossed the floor and sat as a Unionist. From 1928 to 1935, he was the Lieutenant Governor of New Brunswick.

He served with the Canadian Militia and was a captain and adjutant for the 62nd Saint John Fusiliers. He eventually became a lieutenant-colonel and was the commanding officer. From 1903 to 1911, he was the commandant of the 12th Infantry Brigade. From 1911 to 1915, he commanded the 28th New Brunswick Dragoons. He was promoted to colonel and was commander of Canadian Coronation Troops for the coronation of King George V. During World War I, he was appointed officer commanding New Brunswick Troops in April 1915 and in June 1916 he was promoted to brigadier general. He was promoted to major general upon his retirement from the active militia in 1917.

He died in Saint John, New Brunswick in 1938.

== Electoral history ==
1917 Canadian federal election: Fundy Royal
Party	Candidate	Votes	%
Government (Unionist)	Hugh Havelock McLean	5,959	67.77
Opposition (Laurier Liberals)	Fred Ernest Sharp	2,834	32.23
Total valid votes		8,793	100.00
