= New Brunswick Dragoons =

- Active: 1911 - 1936
- Country: Canada
- Branch: Canadian Militia
- Type: Dragoons
- Role: Cavalry
- Size: One Regiment
- Part of: Non-Permanent Active Militia
- Garrison/HQ: Saint John, New Brunswick

The New Brunswick Dragoons was a cavalry regiment of the Non-Permanent Active Militia of the Canadian Militia (now part of the Canadian Army). In 1936, the regiment was Amalgamated with The Saint John Fusiliers.

== Lineage ==
=== The New Brunswick Dragoons ===
- Originated on 2 March 1911, in Saint John, New Brunswick, as the 28th New Brunswick Dragoons.
- Redesignated on 15 March 1920, as The New Brunswick Dragoons.
- Amalgamated on 15 December 1936, with The Saint John Fusiliers.

== History ==
=== The New Brunswick Dragoons ===
The regiment was originally formed on 1 March 1911, when the 28th New Brunswick Dragoons were authorized to be raised in Saint John, New Brunswick.

It had squadrons established at Oromocto, Arcadia and Fredericton.

On 15 March 1920, as a result of the report and recommendations of the Otter Commission, the regiment was Redesignated as The New Brunswick Dragoons.

On 14 December 1936, as part of the 1936 Canadian Militia Reorganization, The New Brunswick Dragoons were amalgamated with the Saint John Fusiliers.

At the same time on 15 December 1936, “B” Squadron of The New Brunswick Dragoons along with “C” Company of 7th Machine Gun Battalion, CMGC were Amalgamated to form the 104th Field Battery, Royal Canadian Artillery.

=== 104th Field Battery, RCA ===
==== Second World War ====
Having first served at home as part of the 3rd (New Brunswick) Coast Brigade, RCA for the first part of the war, on 24 May 1940, the 104th Battery was placed on active service and reorganized as 104th Anti-Tank Battery.

On 25 July 1941, the battery formed part of the 7th Anti-Tank Regiment, RCA which formed part of the I Canadian Corps where it served with during the Battle of Sicily, Italian Campaign and later in Northwest Europe until VE Day.

On 27 June 1945, The active unit was demobilized.

==== Post-War ====
The 104th Battery resumed serving in the Canadian Army Reserve as part of the 3rd Field Artillery Regiment, RCA.

First as an Anti-Aircraft Battery from 1946 until 10 December 1962 when it was converted back to a Field Artillery Battery once again being Redesignated as the 104th Field Battery, RCA.

== Alliances ==
United Kingdom - The Royal Scots Greys (2nd Dragoons) (Until 1936)

== Notable members ==
- Major General Hugh Havelock McLean: 17th Lieutenant Governor of New Brunswick

== See also ==
- List of regiments of cavalry of the Canadian Militia (1900–1920)
