= 55th Battalion (New Brunswick & Prince Edward Island), CEF =

WWI infantry battalion of the Canadian Expeditionary Force

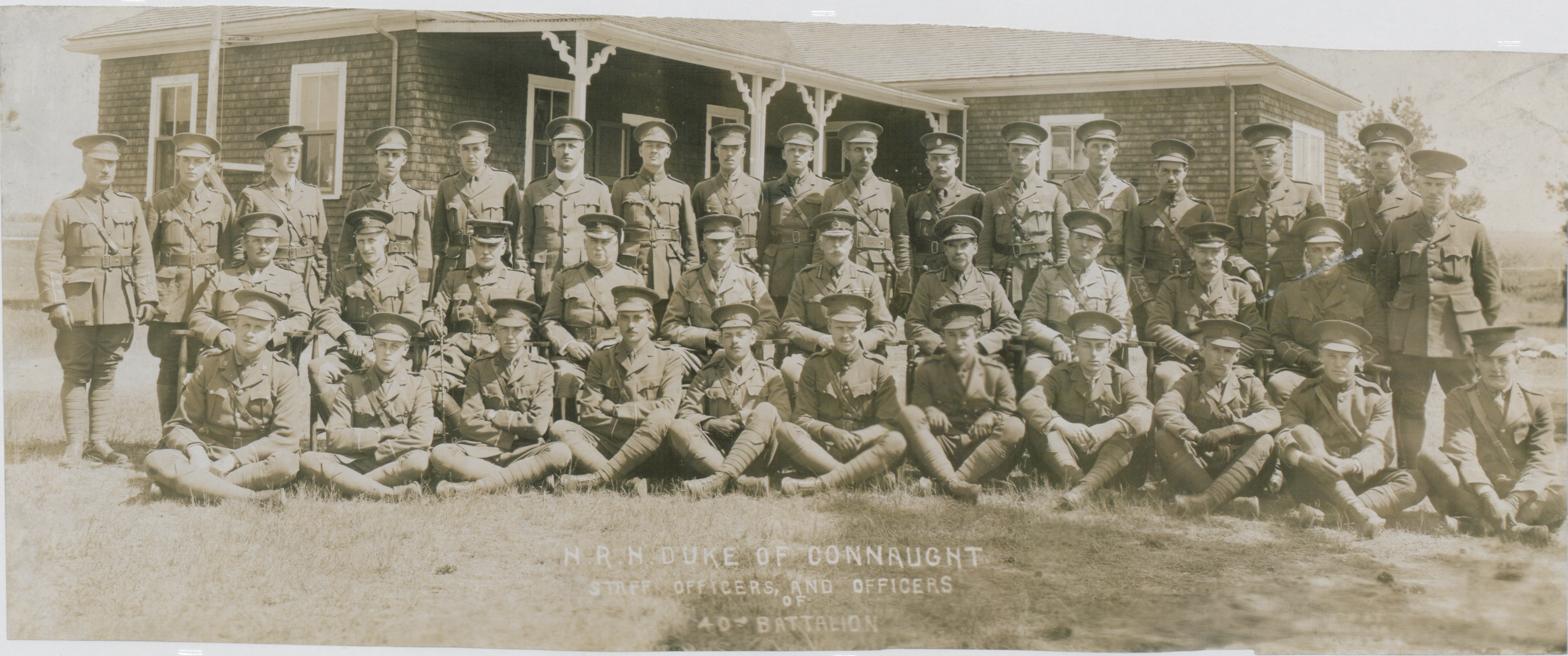
H.R.H. Duke of Connaught the Governor General and staff. Major Gen. Rutherford and Staff Col. Hugh H. McLean, Brigadier, and Staff. Lt. Col. Kirkpatrick and officers, 55th Battalion, CEF (HS85-10-30471)

The 55th Battalion (New Brunswick & Prince Edward Island), CEF was an infantry battalion of the Canadian Expeditionary Force during the Great War. The 55th Battalion was authorized on 7 November 1914 and embarked for Britain on 30 October 1915. It provided reinforcements for the Canadian Corps in the field until 6 July 1916, when its personnel were absorbed by the 40th Battalion (Nova Scotia), CEF. The battalion was disbanded on 21 May 1917.

The 55th Battalion recruited in New Brunswick and Prince Edward Island and was mobilized at Sussex, New Brunswick.

The 55th Battalion had two Officers Commanding:

- Lt.-Col. J.R. Kirkpatrick, 30 October 1915 – 5 May 1916
- Maj. H.I. Jones, 5 May 1916 – 13 May 1916

The 55th Battalion was awarded the battle honour THE GREAT WAR 1915-16.

The 55th Battalion (New Brunswick & Prince Edward Island), CEF is perpetuated by the Royal New Brunswick Regiment.

== Sources ==
- Canadian Expeditionary Force 1914-1919 by Col. G.W.L. Nicholson, CD, Queen's Printer, Ottawa, Ontario, 1962
