= 236th Battalion (New Brunswick Kilties), CEF =

Canadian unit

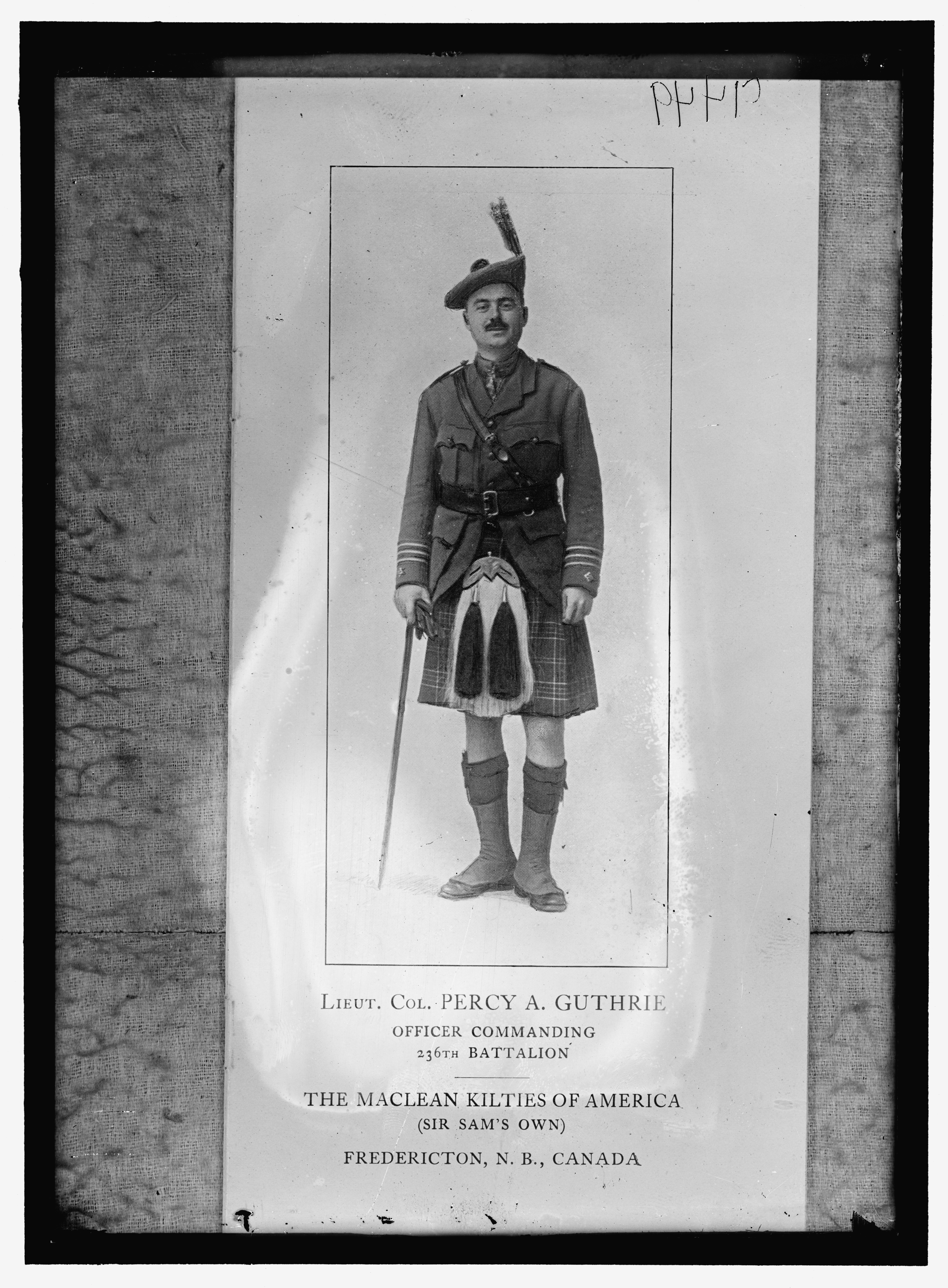
Lt. Col. Guthrie

The 236th (The New Brunswick Kilties) Battalion, CEF was a unit in the Canadian Expeditionary Force during the First World War. Based in Fredericton, New Brunswick and Camp Valcartier, the unit began recruiting in the Spring of 1916 throughout Canada and the New England region in the United States of America. After sailing to England in November 1917, the battalion was absorbed into the 20th Reserve Battalion, CEF in March, 1918. The 236th (The New Brunswick Kilties) Battalion, CEF was also known as the "MacLean Kilties of America" or "Sir Sam's Own".

The Regimental Colours hang in the Great Hall at Duart Castle on the Isle of Mull in Scotland in the care of the Chief of Clan McLean.

It had one Officer Commanding: Lieut-Col. P. A. Guthrie.

The 236th Battalion is perpetuated by the Royal New Brunswick Regiment.
