= 145th Battalion (New Brunswick), CEF =

The 145th Battalion (New Brunswick), CEF was a unit of about 600 men in the Canadian Expeditionary Force during the First World War. Based in Moncton, New Brunswick, the unit began recruiting in late 1915 in Kent, Albert and Westmorland counties. After sailing to England in September 1916, most members of the battalion were absorbed into the 9th Reserve Battalion on October 6, 1916. The 145th Battalion (New Brunswick), CEF, had one Officer Commanding: Lieut-Col. W. E. Forbes.

The 145th Battalion (New Brunswick), CEF is perpetuated by the Royal New Brunswick Regiment.
