= 104th Battalion, CEF =

The 104th Battalion, CEF, was an infantry battalion of the Great War Canadian Expeditionary Force. The 104th Battalion was authorized on 22 December 1915 and embarked for Britain on 28 June 1916, where, on 18 July 1916, its personnel were absorbed by the 47th Battalion, CEF, 17th Reserve Battalion, CEF and the 32nd Battalion, CEF to provide reinforcements for the Canadian Corps in the field. The battalion disbanded on 27 July 1918.

The 104th Battalion recruited throughout New Brunswick and was mobilized at Sussex.

The 104th Battalion was commanded by Lt.-Col. G.W. Fowler from 28 June 1916 to 22 January 1917 and by Lt-Col A. Ernest Ings (formerly the CO of the 105th Bn) from 22 January 1917 to 2 March 1918.

The 104th Battalion was awarded the battle honour THE GREAT WAR 1916-18.

The 104th Battalion, CEF is perpetuated by The Royal New Brunswick Regiment.

== Sources ==
- Canadian Expeditionary Force 1914–1919 by Col. G.W.L. Nicholson, CD, Queen's Printer, Ottawa, Ontario, 1962
