= 40th Battalion (Nova Scotia), CEF =

Canadian infantry battalion

The 40th Battalion, CEF, was an infantry battalion of the Canadian Expeditionary Force during the Great War.

== History ==
The 40th Battalion was authorized on 1 January 1915 and embarked for Britain on 18 October 1915. The battalion provided reinforcements to the Canadian Corps in the field until 4 January 1917, when its personnel were absorbed by the 26th Reserve Battalion, CEF. The battalion was disbanded on 17 July 1917.

The 40th Battalion recruited in Nova Scotia and was mobilized at Aldershot, Nova Scotia.

The 40th battalion had one Officer Commanding, Lt-Col. A.G. Vincent from 18 October 1915 to 4 January 1917.

The 40th Battalion was awarded the battle honour THE GREAT WAR 1915-17.

== Perpetuation ==
The 40th Battalion, CEF, is perpetuated by The Halifax Rifles (RCAC).

== See also ==
- List of infantry battalions in the Canadian Expeditionary Force

== Sources ==
- Canadian Expeditionary Force 1914-1919 by Col. G.W.L. Nicholson, CD, Queen's Printer, Ottawa, Ontario, 1962
