= 115th Battalion (New Brunswick), CEF =

The 115th Battalion (New Brunswick), CEF, was an infantry battalion of the Great War Canadian Expeditionary Force.

It recruited throughout New Brunswick, and was mobilized at St. John. The 115th Battalion was authorized on 22 December 1915 and embarked for Britain on 23 July 1916. It was commanded by Lt.-Col. F.V. Wedderburn on 23 July 1916. The battalion provided reinforcements for the Canadian Corps in the field until 21 October 1916, when its personnel were absorbed by the 112th Battalion, CEF. It was awarded the battle honour The Great War 1916. The battalion disbanded on 1 September 1917.

The 115th Battalion (New Brunswick), CEF, is perpetuated by The Royal New Brunswick Regiment.

== Sources ==
- Canadian Expeditionary Force 1914–1919, by Col. G.W.L. Nicholson, CD, Queen's Printer, Ottawa, Ontario, 1962
