= 12th Battalion, CEF =

- Active: 1914-1920
- Country: Canada
- Branch: Canadian Expeditionary Force
- Size: battalion
- Engagements: First World War

The 12th Battalion, CEF was an infantry battalion of the First World War Canadian Expeditionary Force.

== History ==
It was authorized on 10 August 1914 and embarked for Britain on 30 September 1914, where it was redesignated the 12th Reserve Infantry Battalion, CEF on 29 April 1915, to provide reinforcements for the Canadian Corps in the field. The battalion was reduced during the summer of 1916 and ultimately dissolved. Its residual strength was absorbed on 4 January 1917 into a new 12th Reserve Battalion, upon re-organization of the reserve units of the Canadian Infantry. The battalion was officially disbanded on 30 August 1920.

The 12th Battalion formed part of the Canadian Training Depot at Tidworth Camp.

The 12th Battalion, CEF, had two Officers Commanding and two acting Officers Commanding:

- Lt.-Col. H.F. McLeod, 22 September 1914 - 6 Jul 1916
- Lt.-Col. F.A. Howard, 2 June 1915 - 15 September 1915 (acting)
- Maj. H.G. Deedes, 7 July 1916 - 18 September 1916 (acting)
- Lt.-Col. R. Pellatt, 19 September 1916 - 4 January 1917

== Perpetuations ==
The 12th Battalion, CEF, is perpetuated by The Royal New Brunswick Regiment and The Royal Rifles of Canada, the latter currently on the Supplementary Order of Battle.

== Battle honours ==
The 12th Battalion was awarded the following battle honours:

- Ypres 1915, '17
- Festubert, 1915
- Mount Sorrel
- Somme, 1916
- Arras, 1917, '18
- Hill 70
- Hindenburg Line
- Pursuit to Mons
- THE GREAT WAR 1914-17

== See also ==
- List of infantry battalions in the Canadian Expeditionary Force
