= 26th Battalion (New Brunswick), CEF =

Canadian infantry battalion

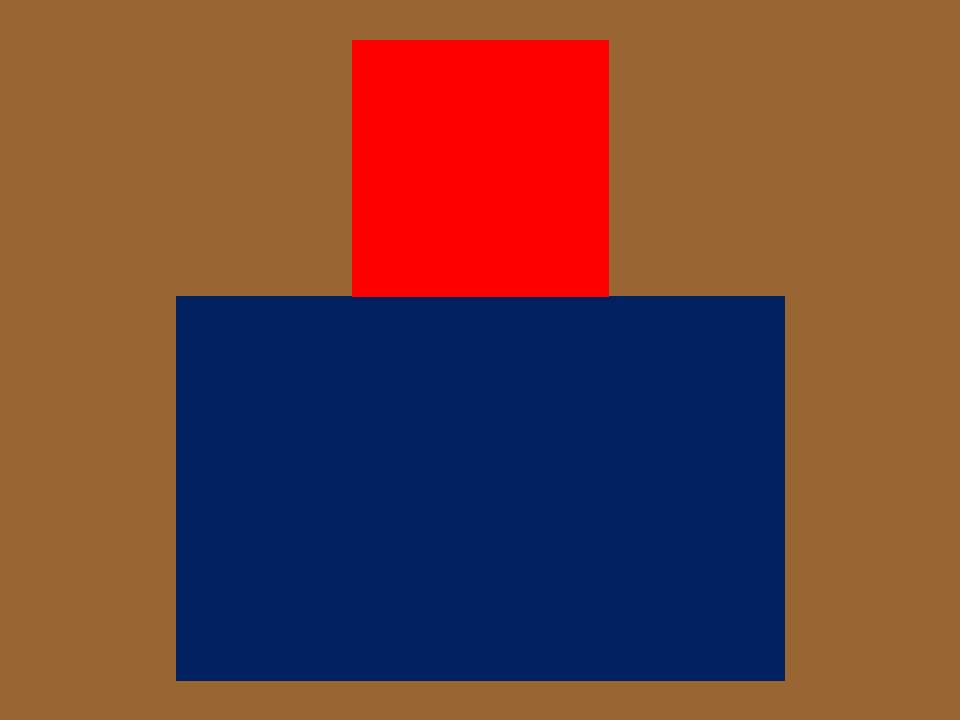
The distinguishing patch of the 26th Battalion (New Brunswick), CEF.

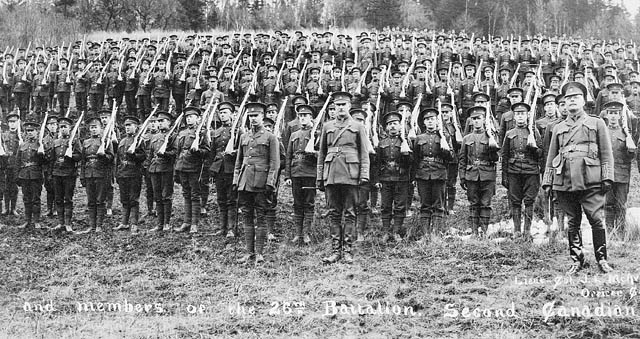
Officers and members of the 26th Battalion

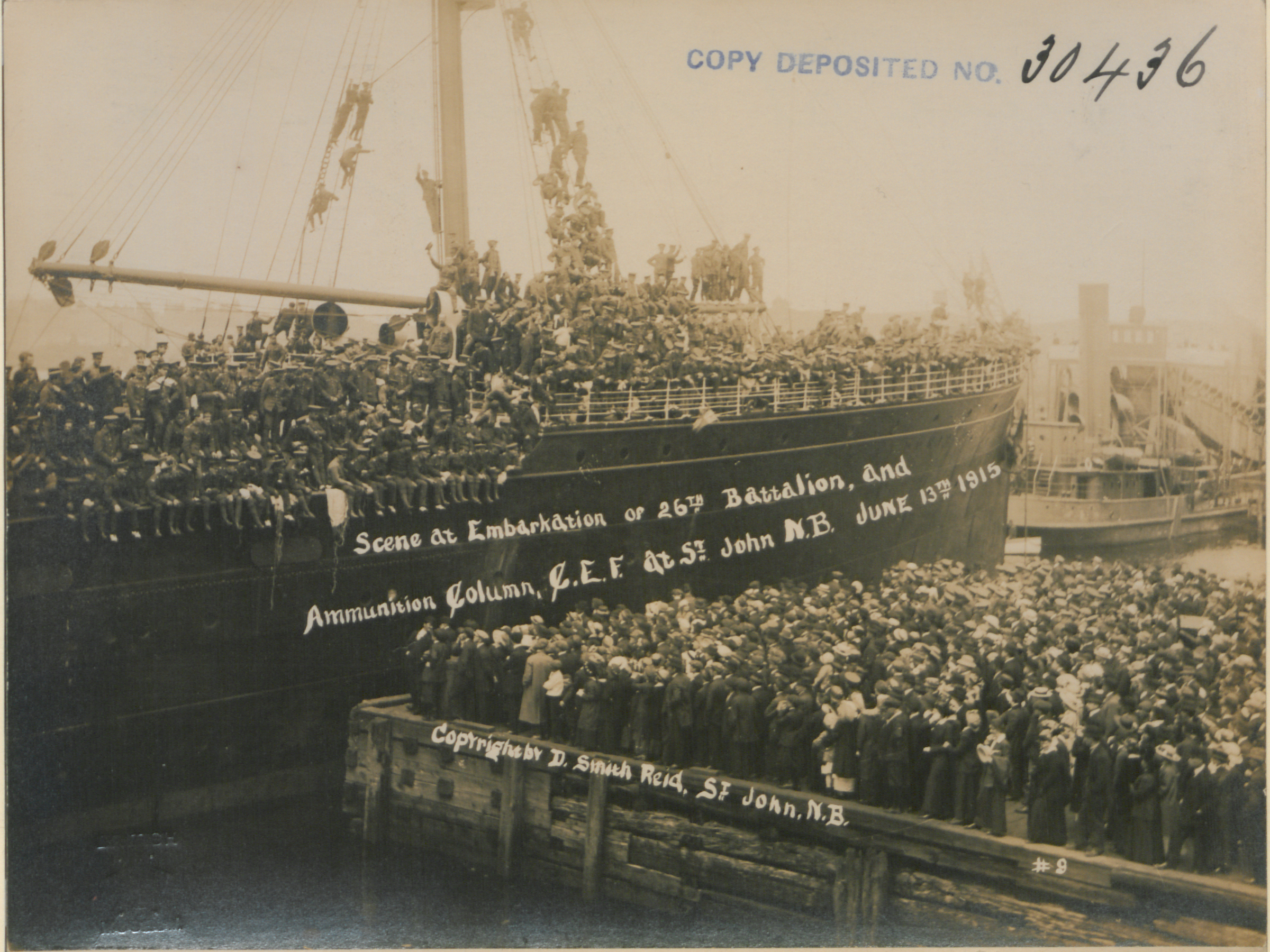
26th Battalion embarking for Europe, 1915

The 26th Battalion (New Brunswick) CEF, was an infantry battalion of the Canadian Expeditionary Force during World War I. The 26th Battalion recruited throughout New Brunswick and was mobilized at Saint John, New Brunswick. The 26th Battalion (New Brunswick), CEF, is perpetuated by The Royal New Brunswick Regiment.

== History ==
The battalion was authorized on 7 November 1914 and embarked for Britain on 15 June 1915. It disembarked in France on 16 September, where it fought as part of the 5th Canadian Infantry Brigade, 2nd Canadian Division in France and Flanders until the end of the war. The battalion was disbanded on 30 August 1920.

== Commanding Officers ==
The 26th battalion had six Officers Commanding:

- Lt.-Col. J.L. McAvity, 15 June 1915 – 29 May 1916
- Lt.-Col. A.E.G. McKenzie, DSO, 29 May 1916 – 2 July 1917
- Lt.-Col. W.R. Brown, DSO, 2 July 1917 – 4 October 1917
- Lt.-Col. A.E.G. McKenzie, DSO, 4 October 1917 – 29 September 1918
- Maj. C.G. Porter, DSO, 28 August 1918 – 5 September 1918
- Lt.-Col. W.R. Brown, DSO, 5 September 1918-Demobilization

== Battle honours ==
The 26th Battalion was awarded the following battle honours:

- MOUNT SORREL
- SOMME, 1916, '18
- Flers-Courcelette
- Thiepval
- Ancre Heights
- ARRAS, 1917, '18
- Vimy, 1917
- Arleux
- Scarpe, 1917, '18
- HILL 70
- Ypres 1917
- Passchendaele
- AMIENS
- HINDENBURG LINE
- Canal du Nord
- Cambrai, 1918
- PURSUIT TO MONS
- FRANCE AND FLANDERS, 1915-18

== See also ==
- List of infantry battalions in the Canadian Expeditionary Force

== Sources ==
- Canadian Expeditionary Force 1914-1919 by Col. G.W.L. Nicholson, CD, Queen's Printer, Ottawa, Ontario, 1962
- The Story of the Fighting 26th, R.W. Gould and S.K.Smith, St John News Co.
