= 140th Battalion (St. John's Tigers), CEF =

Battalion unit

The 140th Battalion (St. John's Tigers), CEF was a unit in the Canadian Expeditionary Force during the First World War. Based in Saint John, New Brunswick, the unit began recruiting in late 1915 throughout New Brunswick. After sailing to England in September 1916, the battalion was absorbed into the 13th Reserve Battalion and The Royal Canadian Regiment and Princess Patricia's Canadian Light Infantry Depots in November 1916. The 140th Battalion (St. John's Tigers), CEF had one Officer Commanding: Lieut-Col. L. H. Beer.

The 140th Battalion is perpetuated by The Royal New Brunswick Regiment.
