= Arras 1918 (Battle honour) =

Arras 1918 was a battle honour awarded to units of the British and Imperial Armies that took part in one or more of the following engagements in World War I:

- First Battle of Arras (28 March 1918)
- Second Battle of Arras (26 August – 3 September 1918)
