= TSQ (disambiguation) =

TSQ is 6-Methoxy-(8-p-toluenesulfonamido)quinoline, one of the most efficient fluorescent stains for zinc(II).

TSQ may also refer to:

- The Study Quran, an English-language translation and commentary of the Quran
- Tianshengqiao-I Dam, an embankment dam and hydroelectric power station on the Nanpan River in China
- tsq, ISO 639-3 code for Thai Sign Language
- Toronto String Quartette, any of various string quartettes in Toronto, Canada
- Transgender Studies Quarterly, the first non-medical academic journal devoted to transgender studies
- Trauma Screening Questionnaire, a questionnaire that pre-assesses posttraumatic stress disorder
