= Roberta Geddes-Harvey =

Canadian organist, choirmaster and composer

Anne Catherine Roberta Geddes-Harvey (née Geddes; 25 December 1849 – 22 April 1930) was a Canadian organist, choirmaster and composer.

== Early life and education ==
Roberta Geddes was born in Hamilton, Ontario, and studied music with Arthur E. Fisher, Humfrey Anger and Edward Fisher, graduating with a Bachelor of Music degree from Trinity College, Toronto, in 1899.

== Career ==
After completing her studies, Geddes-Harvey worked as an organist in Hamilton, and then took a position in 1876 as choirmaster and organist at St. George's Anglican Church in Guelph; she continued in this position for more than fifty years. She died in Guelph, Ontario, in 1930.

== Works ==
Geddes-Harvey wrote hymns, anthems, songs, and instrumental works bearing copyright dates from 1897 to 1919. Selected works include:

- La Terre Bonne (The Land of the Maple Leaf) libretto by A. Klugh (lost)
- The Old Boys Welcome, single remaining song from La Terre Bonne
- Salvator, oratorio to words from the scriptures
