= 83rd Battalion (Queen's Own Rifles of Canada), CEF =

Canadian infantry battalion

The 83rd Battalion (Queen's Own Rifles of Canada), CEF was an infantry battalion of the Canadian Expeditionary Force during the Great War. The 83rd Battalion was authorized on 10 July 1915 and embarked for Britain on 28 April 1916. It provided reinforcements for the Canadian Corps until 7 July 1916, when its personnel were absorbed by the 12th Reserve Battalion, CEF. The battalion was subsequently disbanded on 21 May 1917.

The 83rd Battalion recruited in and was mobilized at Toronto, Ontario.

The 83rd Battalion was commanded by Lt.-Col. R. Pellatt from 1 May 1916 to 17 August 1916.

The 83rd Battalion was awarded the battle honour THE GREAT WAR 1916.

The 83rd Battalion, CEF is perpetuated by The Queen's Own Rifles of Canada.

== Sources ==
Canadian Expeditionary Force 1914–1919 by Col. G.W.L. Nicholson, CD, Queen's Printer, Ottawa, Ontario, 1962
