= 255th Battalion (Queen's Own Rifles of Canada), CEF =

The 255th (Queen's Own Rifles of Canada) Battalion, CEF was a unit in the Canadian Expeditionary Force during the First World War. Based in Toronto, Ontario, the unit began recruiting late in 1916 from The Queen's Own Rifles of Canada, which was based in that city. After sailing to England in June 1917, the battalion was absorbed into the 12th Reserve Battalion, CEF upon arrival. The 255th (Queen's Own Rifles of Canada) Battalion, CEF had one Officer Commanding: Lieut-Col. G. C. Royce.

Stated place-of-birth of those who embarked for overseas with the battalion: Australia: 1; Albania: 1; Canada: 123; Channel Islands: 3; China: 1; England: 95; Galicia: 1; Ireland: 13; Italy: 1; Newfoundland: 1; Russia: 22; Scotland: 24; South America: 1; U.S.A.: 15; not stated: 1.
