= 95th Battalion, CEF =

111th Field Artillery Battalion
- Active: 1915-1917
- Country: Canada
- Branch: Army
- Type: Infantry
- Engagements: World War I

Commanders
- Lieutenant Colonel: Lieutenant Colonel Rybert Kent Barker

The 95th Battalion, CEF, was an infantry battalion of the Great War Canadian Expeditionary Force. It was formed in December 1915, and trained at Shorncliffe Army Camp in Kent. It did not see combat as an independent unit; its soldiers were used to reinforce other Canadian units in the field in Belgium and France. The 95th was disbanded in July 1917.

== History ==
=== Formation ===
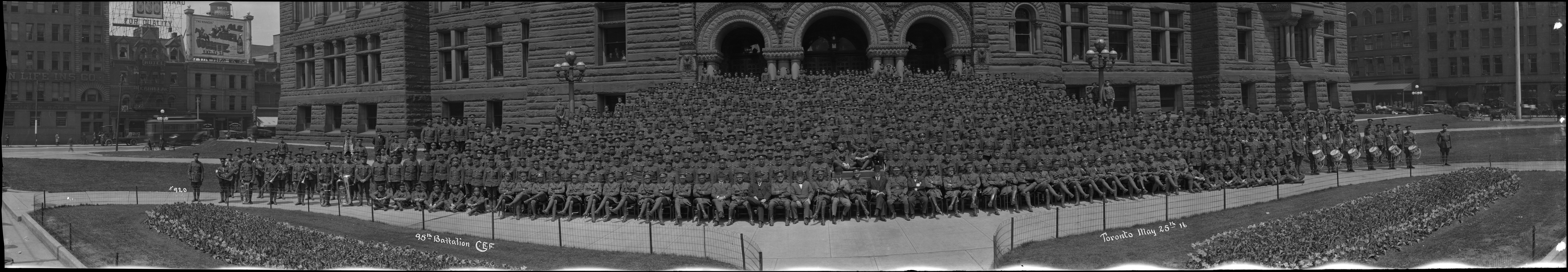
95th Battalion CEF, Toronto, May 25th 1916

The 95th Battalion was authorized on 22 December 1915. The 95th Battalion recruited in, and was mobilized at, Toronto, Ontario. It embarked for Britain from Halifax on RMS Olympic on 31 May 1916, disembarking at Liverpool, England, on 8 June 1916, with a total of 36 officers and 1,061 other ranks.

The 95th trained at Shorncliffe Army Camp, Kent. The unit was commanded by Lieutenant Colonel Rybert Kent Barker from 2 June 1916 to 22 December 1916.

=== Combat ===
The 95th did not see combat as an independent unit. Rather, its soldiers were used to reinforce existing battalions serving in France and Belgium. Its men provided reinforcements for the Canadian Corps in the field in France and Belgium until 24 January 1917, when its personnel were absorbed by the 5th Reserve Battalion, CEF.

=== Disbanded ===
The 95th Battalion was disbanded on 4 August 1917 by Privy Council Order 1895 of 17 July 1917.

The 95th Battalion was awarded the battle honour The Great War 1916–17.

== Legacy ==
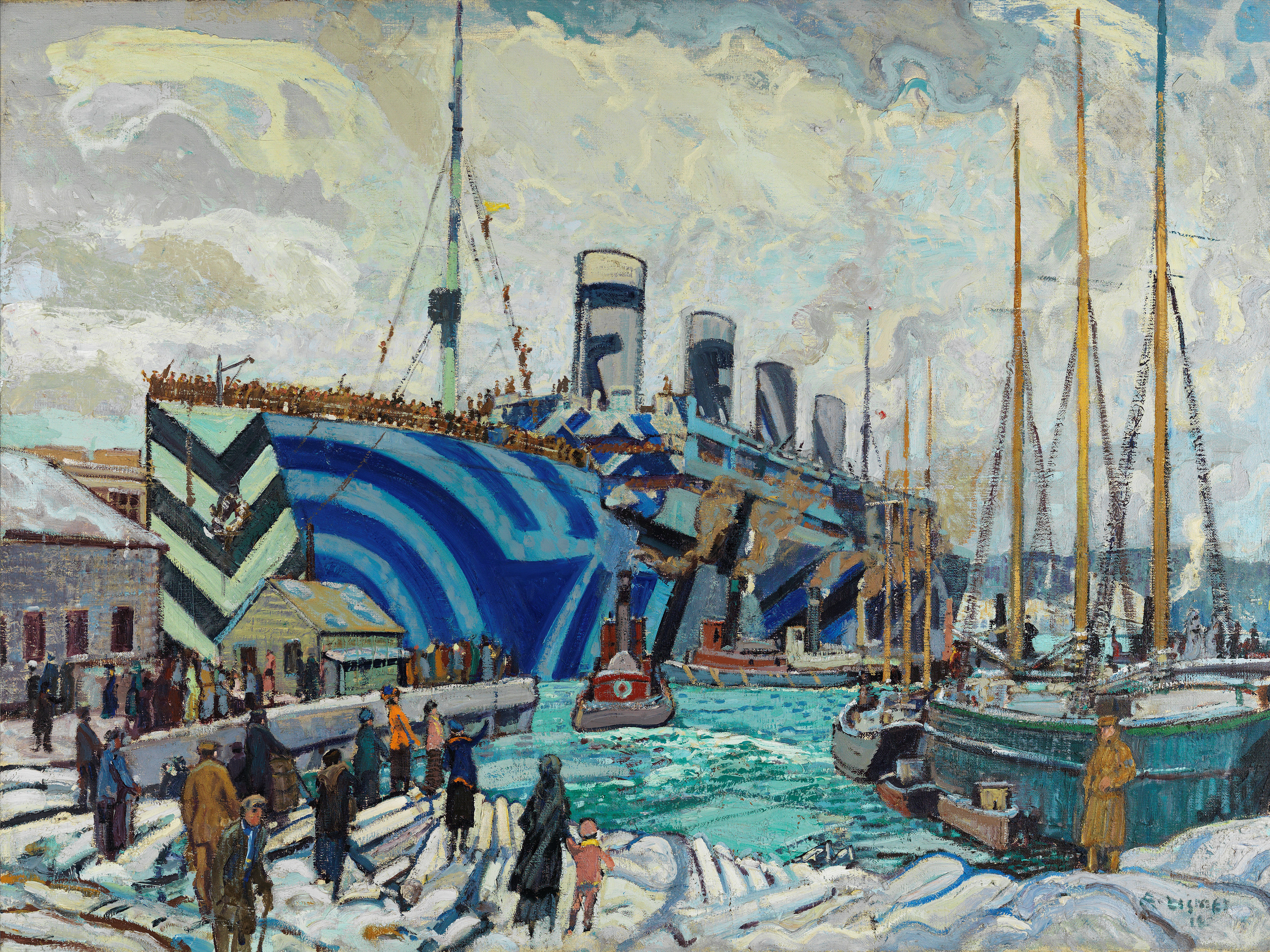
RMS Olympic at Pier 2 in Halifax, Nova Scotia painted by Arthur Lismer

The 95th Battalion, CEF, is perpetuated by The Queen's Own Rifles of Canada.

== Sources ==
- Canadian Expeditionary Force 1914–1919 by Col. G.W.L. Nicholson, CD, Queen's Printer, Ottawa, Ontario, 1962
