= 166th Battalion (Queen's Own Rifles of Canada), CEF =

The 166th (Queen's Own Rifles of Canada) Battalion, CEF was a unit in the Canadian Expeditionary Force during the First World War. Based in Toronto, Ontario, the unit began recruiting during the winter of 1915/16 from The Queen's Own Rifles of Canada, which was based in that city. After sailing to England in October 1916, the battalion was absorbed into the 12th Reserve Battalion on January 8, 1917. The 166th (Queen's Own Rifles of Canada) Battalion, CEF had one Officer Commanding: Lieut-Col. W. G. Mitchell.
