= Queen's Own Rifles of Canada Band & Bugles =

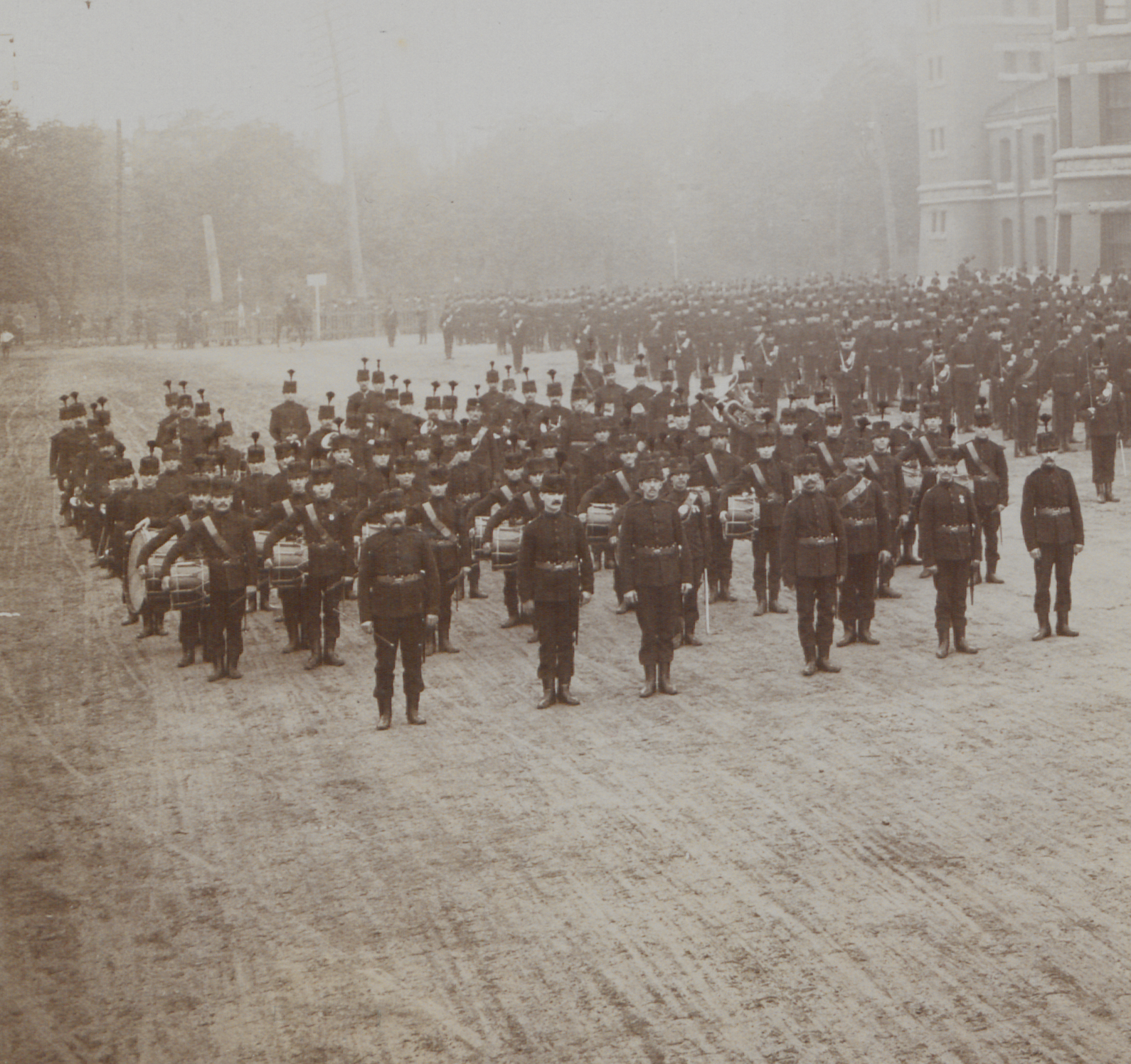
- The band during a formation in Toronto, 1901.
- Active: 1862 to Present
- Country: Canada
- Branch: Canadian Army
- Type: Military band
- Size: 35
- Part of: The Queen's Own Rifles of Canada
- Headquarters: Toronto
- Nickname: Band of the Rifles

Commanders
- Notable commanders: John Bayley; James Buckle; William Atkins

The Queen's Own Rifles of Canada Band & Bugles is a Canadian Forces military band serving as the regimental band for The Queen's Own Rifles of Canada. It is the oldest reserve band in uninterrupted service in Canada. Like the Band and Bugles of The Rifles, the QOR band has a drum and bugle section at the front ranks as a testament to the fact that those instruments were used to give orders on the battlefield during the conflicts of the 18th century. It is currently one of only several drum and bugle corps in the Canadian Armed Forces (CAF) in service.

== History ==
The band was formed in Toronto in 1862 under the direction of Adam Maul, an Englishman who had served in the British Army. The band, at that point, was one of many regiment bands in the Dominion and was not very different from its counterparts. Under the leadership of John Bayley beginning in the mid to late 1870s, the band quickly gained international recognition, especially in the United States. The band toured Canada from east to west for the rest of the century and even made a visit to London in 1910 under the direction of G. L. Timpson. In 1922 and 1923 the band won the First Class 'A' band contest at the Canadian National Exhibition in Toronto. During that time it also assisted the 2,300-member Canadian National Exhibition Chorus in performances at the Central Coliseum. During World War II, director James Buckle maintained the band with great efficiency, performing at concerts for Canadian soldiers throughout Europe. After the war, Captain William T. Atkins was appointed as band director. Serving for 21 years in the band, he organized the band into a first-class musical ensemble which performed often at the Royal Winter Fair and for hockey nights at Maple Leaf Gardens. During the 1980s and early 1990s the band, with an increasing number of women members, was one of the more active units in the Toronto Garrison, performing in parks, at the CNE and often playing at mess functions of the regular force staff.

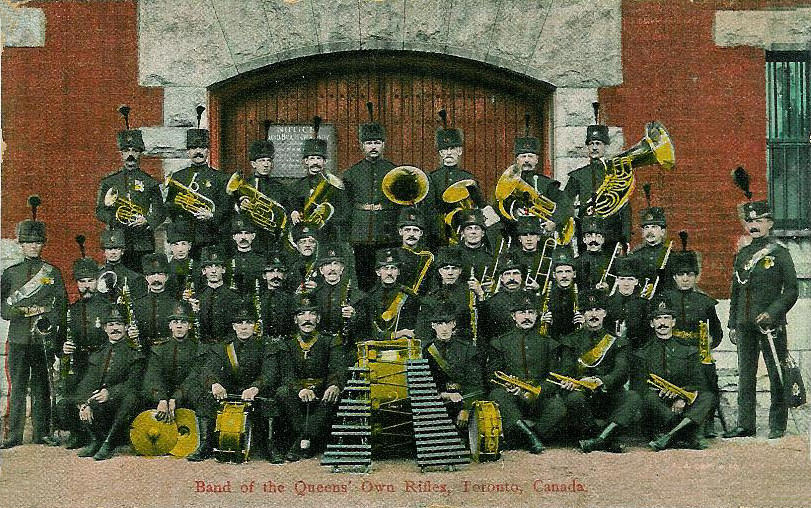
Members of the band in Toronto, 1909.

The DBC portion of the band and bugles has a separate history. It was founded just two years before the band in 1860 by Francis Clark, the first regimental bugle major, and in 1866 was turned into a full drum and bugle corps – the first in the Canadian Army and a pioneer ensemble in North American armed forces, when a bass drummer was added to the growing ensemble of side (snare) drummers and buglers. When Charles Swift became its bandmaster in 1876, its instrumentation was revised, and the bugles now had crook adjustments which made them longer and thus capable of playing F major, aside from the usual B flat major tunes and bugle calls. Its touring concerts in the United States in the late 1880s and into the 1890s thus served as a partial inspiration towards the introduction of the US drum and bugle corps traditions, as well as similar traditions within Canada.

== List of directors ==
- Adam Maul (1862–1875)
- William Carey (1875–1879)
- John Bayley (1879–1901)
- Captain Richard B. Hayward (1921–1928)
- Captain James Buckle (1928–1947)
- Captain William Atkins (1947–68)
- Captain Jack Long (1968–1971)
- Captain John O'Brien (1971–1976)
- Captain George Gresham (1976–1984)
- Captain S. J. Irwin (1984–1987)
- Lieutenant D.R. Ringler (1987–1990)
- Captain S. J. Irwin (1990–1994)
- Charles Benson (1994–1995)
- Captain Rita Arendz (1996–2012)
- Sergeant Jonas Feldman (2012–2014)
- Captain Megan Hodge (2014–Present)

== Notable members ==
- Bugle Major Charles Swift served as Bugle Major of The Queen's Own Rifles Bugle Band from 1876 to 1923 – a total of 47 years.
- Herbert L. Clarke was a well-known American cornet player, feature soloist, bandmaster, and composer who joined The Queen's Own Rifles of Canada Band as a cornetist in 1882.

== See also ==
- Canadian military bands
- The Queen's Own Rifles of Canada
- Military band
