= Queen's Own Rifles of Canada =

Coordinates: 43.654586°N 79.372914°W

The Queen's Own Rifles of Canada
- Badge of the regiment
- Active: 26 April 1860 – present
- Country: Province of Canada (1860–1867); Canada (1867–present)
- Branch: Canadian Army
- Type: Rifle regiment
- Role: Light infantry
- Size: One battalion
- Part of: 32 Canadian Brigade Group
- Garrison/HQ: Moss Park Armoury, Toronto (HQ)/Scarborough
- Motto: In pace paratus (Latin for 'in peace prepared')
- Colours: None (rifle regiments have no colours)
- March: Quick: "The Buffs" and "The Maple Leaf Forever"; Double Past: "Money Musk"
- Anniversaries: 150th Anniversary on 26 April 2010
- Engagements: Fenian Raids; North-West Rebellion; Second Boer War; First World War; Second World War; War in Afghanistan
- Battle honours: See § Battle honours
- Website: queensownrifles.com

Commanders
- Current commander: Lieutenant-Colonel Christopher Boileau, CD
- Colonel-in-Chief: The Queen

Insignia
- Abbreviation: QOR of C

The Queen's Own Rifles of Canada is a Primary Reserve regiment of the Canadian Armed Forces, based in Toronto. The regiment is part of 4th Canadian Division's 32 Canadian Brigade Group. It is the only reserve regiment in Canada to currently have a parachute role. The regiment consists of the reserve battalion, the Regimental Association, and the Regimental Band and Bugles. The official abbreviation is The QOR of C, but in practice the name is more commonly abbreviated to QOR.

The Queen's Own Rifles of Canada parade out of Moss Park Armoury in downtown Toronto. The unit motto is in pace paratus: in peace prepared.

== Regimental structure ==
The Reserve battalion is made up of the following companies:

- Battalion Headquarters & Signals Company
- 60th Company (Moss Park Armoury)
- Buffs Company (Moss Park Armoury)
- Parachute Company (airborne infantry)
- Victoria Company (combat support and combat service support)
- Normandy Company (training depot and battle school staff)
- Regimental Band & Bugles
- Gurkha Company (training and recruitment company)

== Lineage ==
- April 26, 1860 – Second Battalion Volunteer Militia Rifles of Canada
- March 18, 1863 – Second Battalion Volunteer Militia Rifles of Canada or Queen's Own Rifles of Toronto
- January 13, 1882 – 2nd Battalion, Queen's Own Rifles of Canada
- May 8, 1900 – 2nd Regiment Queen's Own Rifles of Canada
- May 1, 1920 – The Queen's Own Rifles of Canada
- November 7, 1941 – 2nd (Reserve) Battalion, The Queen's Own Rifles of Canada
- May 14, 1946 – The Queen's Own Rifles of Canada

On October 16, 1953, it was amalgamated with the Regular Army 1st Canadian Rifle Battalion and 2nd Canadian Rifle Battalion. The 1st Canadian Rifle Battalion and 2nd Canadian Rifle Battalion became the 1st and 2nd Battalions, respectively, of The Queen's Own Rifles of Canada, while the Reserve component was designated as the 3rd Battalion. On September 15, 1968, the 2nd Battalion was reduced to nil strength and transferred to the Supplementary Order of Battle. On April 27, 1970, the 1st Battalion was reduced to nil strength and transferred to the Supplementary Order of Battle, with most of the unit's personnel and equipment transferred to the newly formed 3rd Battalion, Princess Patricia's Canadian Light Infantry (PPCLI), and the Reserve Force battalion automatically became the new home station of the regiment.

=== Lineage chart ===
Lineage chart of The Queen's Own Rifles of Canada

1855	Volunteer Militia Rifle Coy of Barrie
1856	1st Volunteer Militia Rifle Coy of Toronto	3d Volunteer Rifle Coy of Toronto	The Toronto Highland Volunteer Rifle Coy	The Volunteer Foot Arty Coy of Toronto
1860	Converted to rifle coy
1858	The Volunteer Highland Rifle Coy of Whitby
1860	Second Bn Volunteer Militia Rifles of Canada
1863	'Second Bn Volunteer Militia Rifles of Canada' or 'Queen's Own Rifles of Toronto'
1866	Active service (Note: March, June)
1882	2nd Bn, "Queen's Own Rifles of Canada"
1885	Active service (Note: Detachments, April–July)
1900	2nd Regt "Queen's Own Rifles of Canada"
1906	1st Bn, 2nd Regt "Queen's Own Rifles of Canada"	2nd Bn, 2nd Regt "Queen's Own Rifles of Canada"
1914	3rd Bn, CEF
1915	83rd "Overseas" Bn, CEF	95th "Overseas" Bn, CEF	166th "Overseas" Bn, CEF
1916	Absorbed by 12th Reserve Bn	198th "Overseas" Bn, CEF
1917	Absorbed by 5th Reserve Bn	Absorbed by 12th Reserve Bn	255th "Overseas" Bn, CEF
1917	Absorbed by 12th Reserve Bn
1918	Absorbed by 3rd Reserve Bn, CEF
1920	Disbanded
1920	1st Bn (83rd Bn, CEF), The Queen's Own Rifles of Canada	2nd Bn (95th Bn, CEF), The Queen's Own Rifles of Canada	3rd Bn (166th Bn, CEF), (Note: Reserve) The Queen's Own Rifles of Canada	4th Bn (255th Bn, CEF), The Queen's Own Rifles of Canada
1926	4th Bn (198th Bn, CEF), The Queen's Own Rifles of Canada	5th Bn (255th Bn, CEF), The Queen's Own Rifles of Canada
1926	1st Bn (3rd Bn, CEF), The Queen's Own Rifles of Canada	2nd Bn (83rd Bn, CEF), The Queen's Own Rifles of Canada	3rd Bn (95th Bn, CEF), The Queen's Own Rifles of Canada	4th Bn (166th Bn, CEF), The Queen's Own Rifles of Canada	5th Bn (198th Bn, CEF), The Queen's Own Rifles of Canada	6th Bn (255th Bn, CEF), The Queen's Own Rifles of Canada
1936	The Queen's Own Rifles of Canada	Disbanded	Disbanded	Disbanded	Disbanded
1940	The Queen's Own Rifles of Canada, CASF
1941	1st Bn, The Queen's Own Rifles of Canada, CASF	2nd (Reserve) Bn, The Queen's Own Rifles of Canada
1942	3rd Bn, The Queen's Own Rifles of Canada, CASF
1943	Disbanded
1945	Disbanded	4th Bn, The Queen's Own Rifles of Canada, CIC, CAOF
1946	The Queen's Own Rifles of Canada	Disbanded
1951	"E" Coy, (Note: Regular Force) The Queen’s Own Rifles of Canada	"F" Coy, The Queen’s Own Rifles of Canada
1951	Support Coy, 1st Canadian Rifle Bn	1st Canadian Rifle Bn
1952	Support Coy, 2nd Canadian Rifle Bn	2nd Canadian Rifle Bn
1953	1st Bn, The Queen's Own Rifles of Canada	2nd Bn, The Queen's Own Rifles of Canada	3rd Bn, The Queen's Own Rifles of Canada
1968	Supplementary Order of Battle
1970	Supplementary Order of Battle	The Queen's Own Rifles of Canada

== Role ==
The Queen's Own Rifles of Canada are the only Primary Reserve unit in Canada with a parachute tasking. The unit has qualified Parachute Instructors, Drop Zone/Landing Zone Controllers and Jumpmasters. Members also take courses in helicopter operations, aerial delivery, and as Recce and Advanced Mountain Operations Instructors. Members of The QOR have also been sent on the Patrol Pathfinder Course. Qualified personnel in jump positions are allowed the honour of wearing the maroon beret. Trained private soldiers are addressed as Riflemen.

The Queen's Own Rifles have a long-standing support role with the Canadian Army Advanced Warfare Centre, where QOR parachute instructors and other personnel on staff instruct on and support parachuting courses. The unit can augment the 3 RCR parachute company with a half-platoon of paratroopers when required.

The battalion deploys by parachute on numerous Field Training Exercises during the year and during divisional exercises during the summer.

The Canadian Forces SkyHawks Parachute Demonstration Team has had support from The Queen's Own Rifles of Canada, with several members joining the elite demonstration team.

== History ==
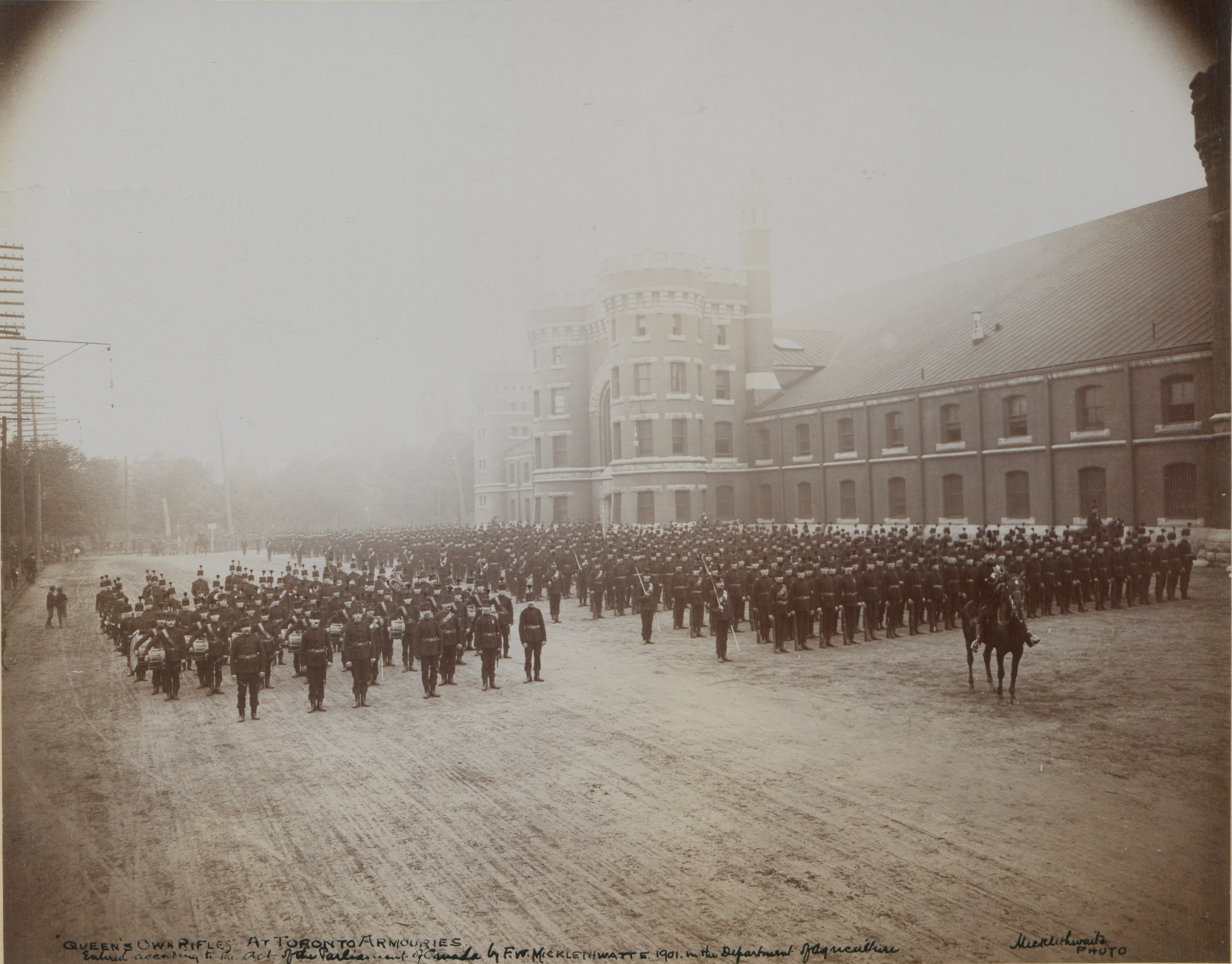
Queen's Own Rifles at Toronto Armories (HS85-10-12532)

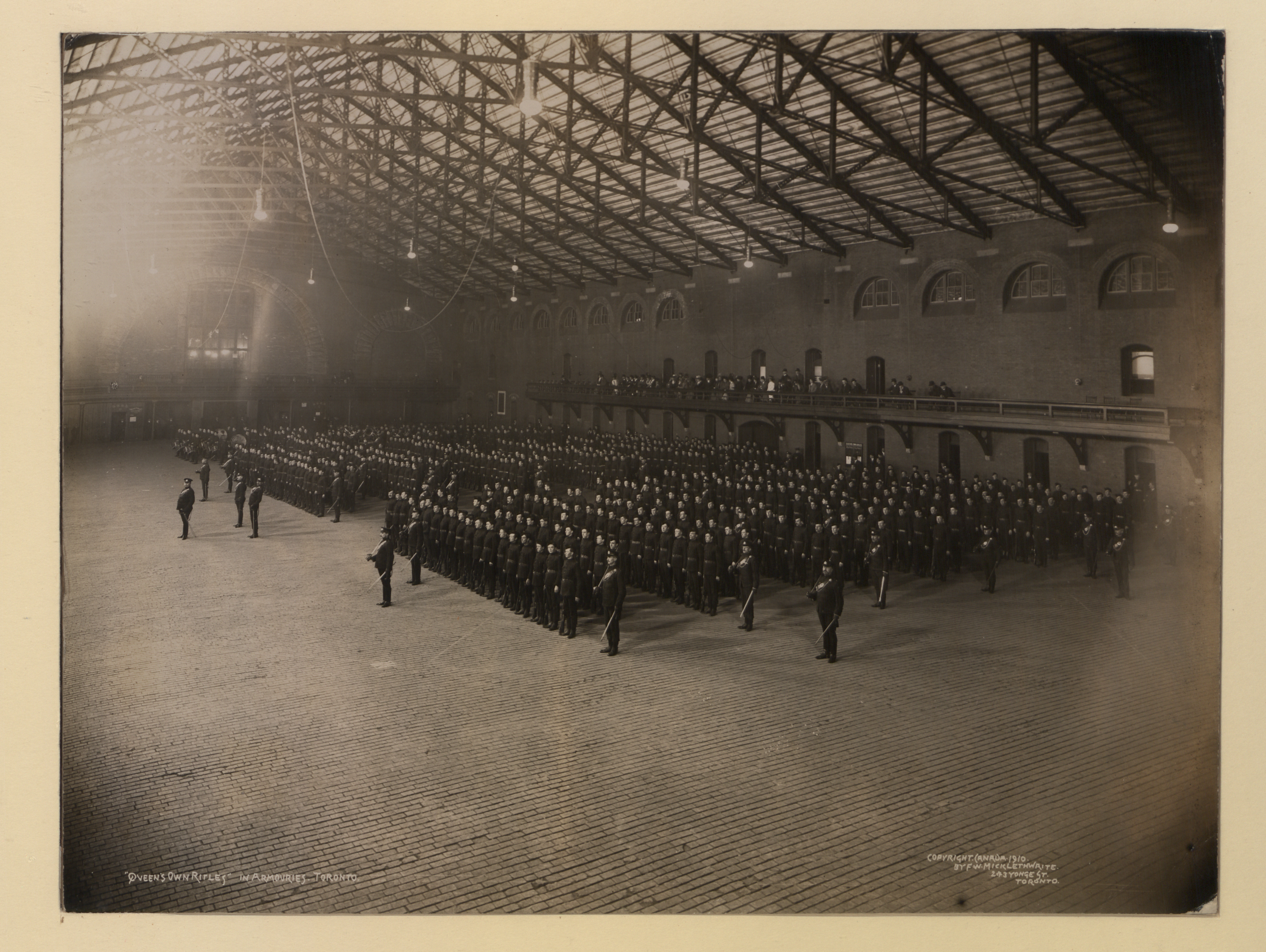
Queen's Own Rifles on parade in a Toronto drill hall, 1910

The 2nd Battalion, Volunteer Militia Rifles of Canada was formed on April 26, 1860, predating the Confederation of Canada. Its first commanding officer was Lieutenant Colonel William Smith Durie.

During the Trent Affair of 1862, William Mulock asked John McCaul, the head of University College (part of the University of Toronto), to call a student meeting that led to the formation of the University Rifle Company of volunteers, 9 Company of The Queen's Own Rifles of Toronto, later K Company of The Queen's Own Rifles of Canada. University of Toronto professor Henry Holmes Croft was a member and was its captain.

It was re-designated as the Second Battalion Volunteer Militia Rifles of Canada or Queen's Own Rifles of Toronto on March 18, 1863.

The name was chosen to honour Queen Victoria.

=== Fenian Raids ===
The Queen's Own Rifles of Toronto were called out on active service from March 8 to 31 and from June 1 to 22, 1866. The battalion fought on the Niagara frontier. The Queen's Own Rifles first saw combat and sustained nine killed in action during the Battle of Ridgeway in 1866, where they and the 13th Volunteer Infantry Battalion (The Royal Hamilton Light Infantry) were routed by a massive force of better armed Fenian insurgents who were U.S. Civil War veterans.

It was renamed as 2nd Battalion, Queen's Own Rifles of Canada on January 13, 1882.

=== North-West Rebellion ===
During the North-West Rebellion, the 2nd Battalion, Queen's Own Rifles of Canada mobilized detachments for active service on April 10, 1885. They served with General William Otter's column and fought in the Battle of Cut Knife. They were removed from active service on July 24, 1885.

=== South African War ===
It was named the 2nd Regiment Queen's Own Rifles of Canada on 8 May 1900. The regiment contributed volunteers for the Canadian Contingents, mainly the 2nd (Special Service) Battalion, Royal Canadian Regiment of Infantry. The Second Boer War was the first time that soldiers from the regiment fought on foreign soil. They were recognized for their service and earned a battle honour for the regiment, even though they were not allowed to wear the QOR cap badge in South Africa.

=== Great War ===
Details of the regiment were placed on active service on August 6, 1914, for local protection duties. In the First World War, none of the existing militia infantry regiments in Canada were formally mobilized. In 1914 The Queen's Own formed the 3rd Canadian Battalion (Toronto Regiment), CEF. The 3rd Battalion, CEF was authorized on August 10, 1914, and embarked for Britain on September 26, 1914. It disembarked in France on February 11, 1915, and fought as part of the 1st Infantry Brigade, 1st Canadian Division, in France and Flanders until the end of the war. The battalion was disbanded on August 30, 1920.

Later in the war, The Queen's Own Rifles recruited for additional Canadian Expeditionary Force battalions, which did not enter combat as units, but supplied reinforcements to the Canadian Corps.

The 83rd Battalion (Queen's Own Rifles of Canada) was authorized on July 10, 1915, and embarked for Britain on April 28, 1916. It provided reinforcements for the Canadian Corps in the field until July 7, 1916, when its personnel were absorbed by the 12th Reserve Battalion, CEF. The battalion was subsequently disbanded on May 21, 1917.

The 95th Battalion (Queen's Own Rifles of Canada) was authorized on December 22, 1915, and embarked for Britain on May 31, 1916. It provided reinforcements for the Canadian Corps in the field until January 24, 1917, when its personnel were absorbed by the 5th Reserve Battalion, CEF, and was disbanded on July 17, 1917.

The 166th Battalion (Queen's Own Rifles of Canada) was authorized on December 22, 1915, and embarked for Britain on October 12 and 17, 1916. It provided reinforcements for the Canadian Corps in the field until January 8, 1917, when its personnel were absorbed by the 12th Reserve Battalion, CEF. The battalion was disbanded on September 15, 1917.

The 198th Battalion (Canadian Buffs) was authorized on July 15, 1916, and embarked for Britain on March 28, 1917. It provided reinforcements for the Canadian Corps in the field until March 9, 1918, when its personnel were absorbed by the 3rd Reserve Battalion, CEF. The battalion was then disbanded on November 29, 1918.

The 255th Battalion (Queen's Own Rifles of Canada) was authorized on May 1, 1917, and embarked for Britain on June 6, 1917. On June 12, 1917, its personnel were absorbed by the 12th Reserve Battalion, CEF to provide reinforcements for the Canadian Corps in the field. The battalion was disbanded on September 1, 1917.

The Queen's Own Rifles have perpetuated the traditions and battle honours of the 3rd Battalion, 83rd Battalion, 95th Battalion, 166th Battalion, 198th Battalion, and 255th Battalion, CEF. Both the QOR and The Royal Regiment of Canada perpetuate the 3rd Battalion.

=== Between the wars ===
It was designated "The Queen's Own Rifles of Canada" on May 1, 1920.

=== Second World War ===
The regiment mobilized for active service on May 24, 1940. It was then redesignated as the 1st Battalion, The Queen's Own Rifles of Canada, CASF on November 7, 1940. The unit served in Newfoundland (at the time a separate Dominion) in the defence of two strategic airfields at Botwood and Gander in Newfoundland from August 10 to December 15, 1940. After a build-up and training period, the unit embarked for Britain on July 19, 1941. The regiment mobilized the 3rd Battalion, The Queen's Own Rifles of Canada, CASF for active service on May 12, 1942. It served in Canada in a home defence role as part of the 20th Infantry Brigade, 7th Canadian Infantry Division. The battalion was disbanded on August 15, 1943.

For the Invasion of Normandy, the regiment landed in Normandy, France, as part of the 8th Infantry Brigade, 3rd Canadian Infantry Division. The first major combat operations were on D-day June 6, 1944. The Queen's Own Rifles landed on "Nan" sector of Juno Beach and with the support of tanks of the Fort Garry Horse captured the strategic seaside resort town of Bernières-sur-Mer. The battalion fought its way to its D-Day objective – the village of Anisy 13.5 km (8.4 mi) inland, the only regiment to reach its assigned objective that day. The QOR had the highest casualties amongst the Canadian regiments, with 143 killed, wounded or captured. As well as losses in the initial landing, the reserve companies' landing craft struck mines as they approached the beach.

In the battle for Caen, the QOR – as part of the 8th Infantry Brigade – participated in Operation Windsor to capture the airfield at Carpiquet which was defended by a detachment from the 12th SS Panzer-Division Hitler Jugend. The Germans inflicted heavy casualties and Panzer-grenadiers attempted to recapture the village.

During the war, 463 riflemen were killed in action and almost 900 were wounded as they fought through Normandy, Northern France, and into Belgium and the Netherlands, where they liberated the crucial Channel ports. Sixty more members of the regiment were killed while serving with other units in Hong Kong, Italy and northwest Europe. The overseas battalion was disbanded on November 30, 1945.

On June 1, 1945, a third Active Force battalion, designated the 4th Battalion, The Queen's Own Rifles of Canada, CIC, CAOF, was mobilized for service with the Canadian Army Occupation Force in Germany. The battalion was disbanded on May 14, 1946.

In October 1953, the status of the regiment was upgraded, and it was made a part of the Regular Force. The regiment consisted of two Regular Force battalions and the Reserve (Third) battalion in Toronto until 1968. There was also a regimental depot in Calgary.

=== Korea ===
The 2nd Battalion, commanded by LCol W.H.V. Matthews, served in Korea following the armistice from 26 March 54 to April 6, 1955.

The following members of the 2nd Battalion died in Korea:

- Rifleman Norman Philip Ferland, March 31, 1954.
- Lt Neil MacDonald Anderson, August 25, 1954.
- Sgt Gerald Walter Koch, August 4, 1954.
- Lt Milton Cameron Vipond March 18, 1955.
- Rifleman George Peter Reid, June 11, 1955.

Maj. Philip Edwin Gower, MC, died on December 9, 1956, while serving with the United Nations Command Military Assistance Commission. As part of the Regular Force, the unit was involved in the Korean War.

=== Cold War ===
The Regular Force battalions served on NATO duty in Germany and served on UN duty in Cyprus.

In 1963, the 1st Battalion QOR of C was relocated from Currie Barracks in Calgary to Work Point Barracks at Esquimalt Garrison, replacing the 1st Battalion Princess Patricia's Canadian Light Infantry, which was deployed to West Germany.

The camp flag of the Queen's Own Rifles of Canada.

In 1970, with the downsizing of the Canadian Forces, the 1st Battalion of The Queen's Own Rifles of Canada was rebadged as the 3rd Battalion Princess Patricia's Canadian Light Infantry.

From 1983 to 1995, the regiment was operationally tasked to provide an airborne company to the Canadian Airborne Regiment.

Members of The Queen's Own Rifles of Canada have served on recent overseas deployments including: UNTAG (United Nations Transition Assistance Group) Namibia 1989–1990, Cambodia, Cyprus, Somalia (for Operation Deliverance 1992–1993 members were attached to 1, 2 and 3 Commando of the Canadian Airborne Regiment), Sierra Leone, Bosnia, Kosovo, Afghanistan, Darfur and Sudan.

The unit played a large role in the purchase of the Victoria Cross of Corporal Frederick George Topham in 2005 and its subsequent donation to the Canadian War Museum.

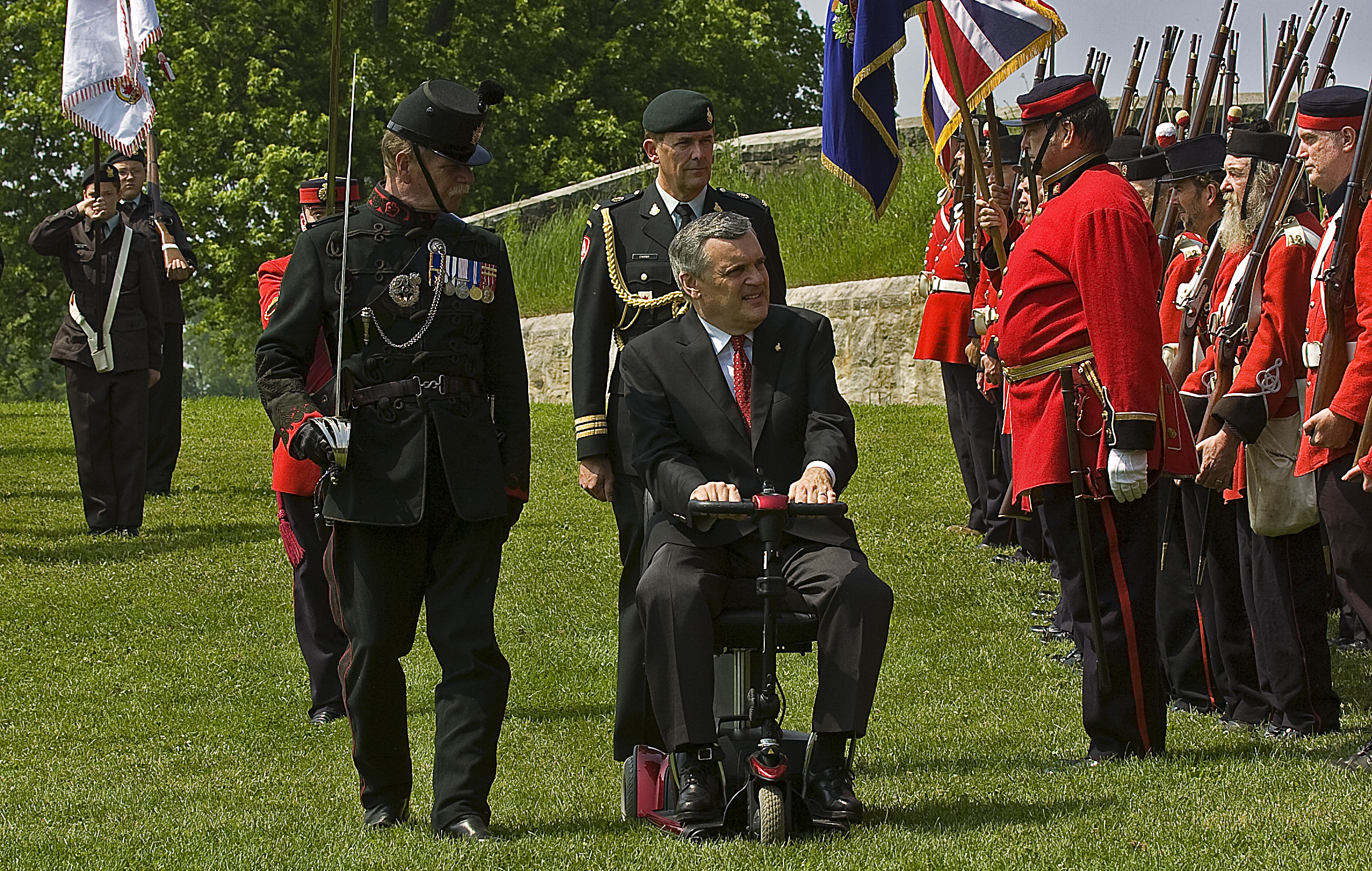
A QOR sword escort with Lieutenant Governor David Onley during an inspection of Battle of Ridgeway reenactors. The reenactment took place during the 150th anniversary of the QOR in 2010

On April 22, 2006, The QOR of C opened Dalton Armoury in Scarborough as part of the Land Force Reserve Restructure expansion. Buffs Company parades out of Dalton Armoury. In September 1910, the QOR went on a 13-mile (21 km) route march with The Buffs (East Kent) Regiment of the British Army. It was noted that the Buffs and QOR used the same regimental march, a tune known as "The Regimental Quick Step of the Buffs" composed for The Buffs by Handel. A regimental alliance was made official in 1914.

== Alliances ==
- United Kingdom – The Rifles (2007–present)
- United Kingdom – The Royal Gurkha Rifles (1994–present)
- United Kingdom – The Princess of Wales's Royal Regiment (Queen's and Royal Hampshires) (1992–present)

=== Historical alliances ===
- United Kingdom – The Brigade of Gurkhas (1982–1994)
- United Kingdom – The Royal Green Jackets (1966–2007)
- United Kingdom – The Queen's Regiment (1966–1992)
- United Kingdom – The Queen's Own Buffs, The Royal Kent Regiment (1961–1966)
- United Kingdom – The King's Royal Rifle Corps (1956–1966)
- United Kingdom – The Buffs (Royal East Kent Regiment) (1935–1961)
- United Kingdom – The Buffs (East Kent Regiment) (1914–1935)

== Battle honours ==
The Queen's Own Rifles of Canada has earned 47 battle honours during its history, which are emblazoned on the regimental drums (rifle regiments do not carry "colours").

=== North West Rebellion honours ===
- North West Canada 1885‡

=== South African War honours ===
- South Africa 1899–1900‡

=== Great War honours ===
- Ypres, 1915
- Gravenstafel Ridge
- St. Julien‡
- Festubert, 1915
- Mount Sorrel
- Somme, 1916‡
- Pozières Ridge
- Flers-Courcelette‡
- Ancre Heights
- Arras, 1917
- Vimy, 1917‡
- Arleux
- Scarpe 1917
- Hill 70‡
- Ypres, 1917
- Passchendaele‡
- Amiens‡
- Arras, 1918
- Scarpe 1918
- Drocourt-Quéant
- Hindenburg Line
- Canal du Nord‡
- Pursuit to Mons‡
- France and Flanders, 1915–18

=== Second World War honours ===
- Normandy Landing‡
- Le Mesnil-Patry‡
- Caen‡
- Carpiquet
- Bourguébus Ridge‡
- Faubourg de Vaucelles
- Falaise‡
- Quesnay Wood
- The Laison
- Boulogne, 1944‡
- Calais, 1944
- The Scheldt‡
- Breskens Pocket
- The Rhineland‡
- Waal Flats
- The Hochwald‡
- The Rhine‡
- Emmerich – Hoch Elten
- Deventer
- North-West Europe, 1944–45

=== South West Asia honours ===
- Afghanistan ‡

== Important engagements ==
- Battle of Ridgeway, Fenian Raids, 1866
- Battle of Cut Knife, North-West Rebellion, 1885
- First World War
  - St Julien
  - Hill 70
  - Passchendaele
  - Mount Sorrel
  - Amiens
  - Somme, 1916
  - Flers-Courcelette
  - Canal du Nord
  - Pursuit to Mons
  - Vimy, 1917
- Second World War
  - Normandy Landing
  - Le Mesnil-Patry
  - The Scheldt
  - Caen
  - The Rhineland
  - Bourguebus Ridge
  - The Hochwald
  - Falaise
  - The Rhine
  - Boulogne, 1944

== Victoria Cross recipients ==
Seven members of the Regiment have been awarded the Victoria Cross, Canada's highest military award:

- Capt Thain Wendell MacDowell, VC, DSO (April 9, 1917)
- Cpl Colin Fraser Barron, VC (November 6, 1917)
- 2Lt Edmund De Wind, VC, (Killed in action March 21, 1918)
- Lt Charles Smith Rutherford, VC, MC, MM (August 26, 1918)
- Lt Wallace Lloyd Algie, VC (Killed in action October 11, 1918)
- Lt George Fraser Kerr, VC, MC & Bar, MM (September 27, 1918)
- Sgt Aubrey Cosens, VC (Killed in action February 25/26, 1945)

== Colonels-in-chief ==
- Queen Mary (1928–1953)
- Princess Alexandra, The Honourable Lady Ogilvy (1960–2010)
- Queen Camilla (2011–present)

== Notable members ==
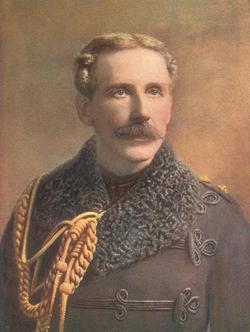
LCol William Dillon Otter

- Vincent Massey was appointed Governor General of Canada in 1952. He was the first Canadian appointed to the post, and since then the governor general has always been a Canadian citizen. Massey Hall in Toronto was donated by his family.
- Donald Ethell, Lieutenant-Governor of Alberta 2010–2015.
- Sir John Morison Gibson (January 1, 1842 – June 3, 1929) was a Lieutenant Governor of Ontario. He was a lieutenant during the Fenian Raids, and fought at the Battle of Ridgeway.
- Sir Hugh John Macdonald was the son of John A. Macdonald, was a member of the House of Commons of Canada, a federal cabinet minister, and as the eighth Premier of Manitoba.
- Lieutenant-Colonel Barney Danson, PC, CC, served with the regiment in Normandy and later was Minister of National Defence. He is a Companion of the Order of Canada, Canada's highest civilian honour.
- General Sir William Dillon Otter (December 3, 1843 – May 6, 1929) was the first Canadian-born chief of the general staff, the head of the Canadian Army. In 1890, Otter founded the Royal Canadian Military Institute as a body for "the promotion and fostering of military art, science and literature in Canada." He was appointed as the first commanding officer of the Royal Canadian Regiment of Infantry in 1893.
- Lieutenant-General Charles H. Belzile was a former head of the Canadian Army.
- Major-General Lewis MacKenzie (born April 30, 1940) is a Canadian retired general and writer. MacKenzie established and commanded Sector Sarajevo as part of the United Nations Protection Force or UNPROFOR in Yugoslavia in 1992.
- Major-General Malcolm Mercer was a barrister and art patron who practised law in Toronto. He led the 3rd Canadian Division during the first two years of the First World War before he was killed in action at Mount Sorrel in Belgium. He remains the most senior Canadian officer to die in combat.
- Major-General Sir Henry Pellatt, CVO (January 6, 1859 – March 8, 1939) was a well-known Canadian financier and soldier who built Casa Loma.
- Brigadier General John "Jock" Spragge, DSO, OBE, ED joined as a rifleman in 1925 and rose to become commanding officer of the Queen's Own Rifles on D-Day and in August 1944, Officer Commanding 7th Canadian Infantry Brigade.
- Lieutenant-Colonel Arthur Peuchen was a businessman and RMS Titanic survivor. He commanded the Home Battalion of the QOR during the First World War.
- Major John Hasek was a journalist and author of The Disarming of Canada. He was the first commander of the SkyHawks Parachute Team, and also served in Ghana, Vietnam and Cyprus. Hasek was injured and killed while reporting on the war in Yugoslavia in 1994.
- Major Ben Dunkelman – Promoted through the ranks from private to major during the Second World War. Saw action at Caen, Falaise, and the Battle of the Scheldt. His father was David Dunkelman, the founder of Tip Top Tailors.
- Major Edward Arunah Dunlop, Jr. was an MPP and first president of the Toronto Sun. He was blinded during the Second World War while trying to save a soldier from a grenade.
- Surgeon-Major James Thorburn was a medical doctor and a professor of pharmacology and therapeutics at the University of Toronto
- Captain and Assistant Surgeon Norman Bethune, Sr., MD was a physician and medical educator who served with the Queen's Own from 1877 to 1879. His grandson was Henry Norman Bethune, MD, the internationally known physician who doctored in the Spanish Civil War and in China during the Communist Revolution.
- Lieutenant Norm Gardner, former Chair of the Toronto Police Services Board.
- Bugle Major Charles Swift was Bugle Major of The Queen's Own Rifles Bugle Band from 1876 to 1923 – a total of 47 years.
- Herbert L. Clarke was a well-known American cornet player, feature soloist, bandmaster, and composer who joined The Queen's Own Rifles of Canada Band as a cornetist in 1882.
- Frederick J. Conboy was Mayor of Toronto from 1941 to 1944. He joined the unit as a Rifleman during the World War II in response to a government appeal for more volunteers.
- Rifleman John Andrew Forin, served in the North-West Rebellion where he kept a diary of his experience, later moved to British Columbia where he practised law before serving as a County Judge.
- Alexander Muir—author of "The Maple Leaf Forever", fought at the Battle of Ridgeway
- John Bayley was the bandmaster of the regimental band from 1879 to 1901.
- K. Dock Yip, reservist during World War II, first Chinese Canadian to practice law and local activist.
- Lance corporal Albert Tilson, hockey player and namesake of the Red Tilson Trophy.

== The Queen's Own Rifles of Canada Regimental Museum and Archives ==
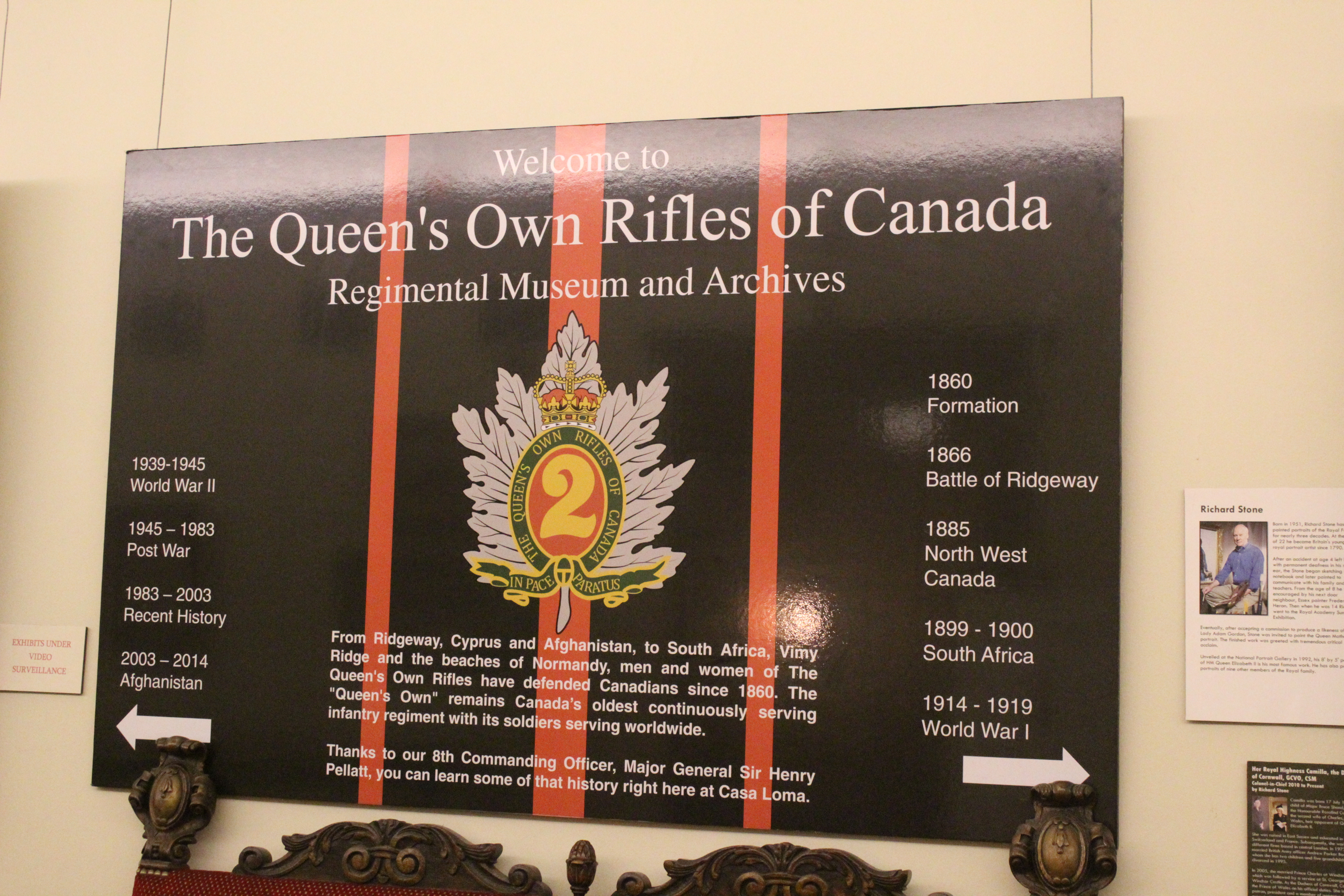
Sign to the Regimental Museum and Archives at Casa Loma.

The Queen's Own Rifles of Canada Regimental Museum and Archives is on the third floor of the historic Casa Loma château in Toronto. Sir Henry Pellatt, who built Casa Loma, was an ardent supporter of the regiment, and was knighted in 1905 for his service with the unit.

Three non-functioning firearms – a Sten submachine gun, Bren light machine gun and a Bock bolt-action rifle – were stolen during a 2008 break-in. They were later recovered and returned. Two suspects were arrested after police used DNA analysis, fingerprints, and tips from the public to identify them.

== Regimental church ==
St. Paul's, Bloor Street, Anglican Church in Toronto has been the regimental church of the QOR since 1910. It is located at 227 Bloor Street between Church Street and Ted Rogers Way (which connects to Jarvis Street, which is further south).

The Cross of Sacrifice outside the church is dedicated to the members of the QOR who have died in combat. It was built and dedicated after the First World War.

The Books of Remembrance are a list of the names of the QOR dead, and are in the interior of the church. The books are displayed annually on Remembrance Day Sunday, when the regiment parades to St. Paul's to attend services.

== Memorials ==
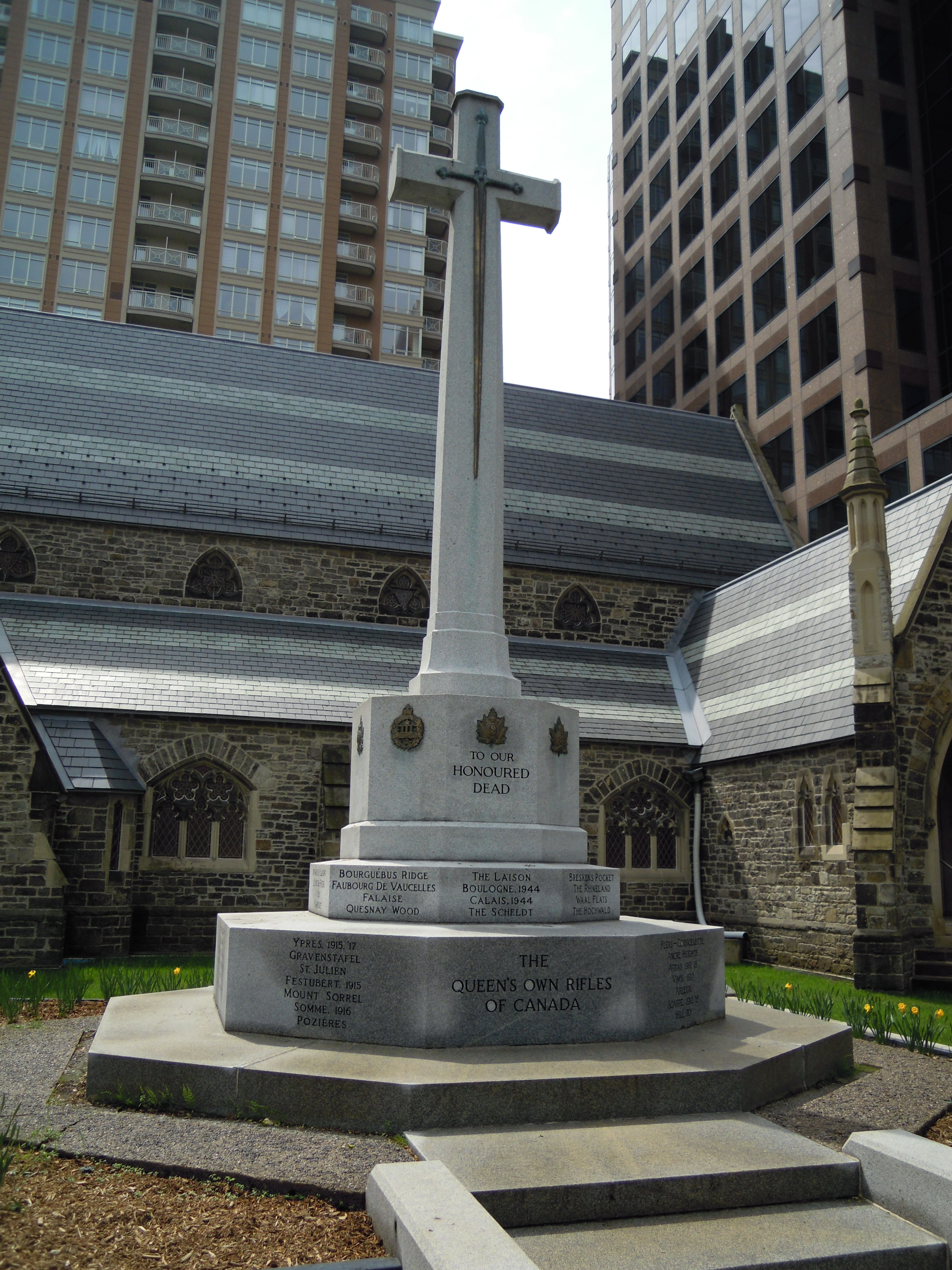
The Cross of Sacrifice at St. Paul's Anglican Church in Toronto

The most recent is the regimental badge carved on the back of one of the pews of the Royal Memorial Chapel at Royal Military Academy Sandhurst.

The oldest memorial is the Ridgeway tablet at the Memorial United Church in Ridgeway, Ontario. Ridgeway is also commemorated in a stained glass window at University College, a tablet in the Ontario Provincial Parliament buildings, the Canadian Volunteers Monument in Queen's Park (west side of Queen's Park Crescent) and a cairn at Ridgeway.

A sandstone monument with Italian marble figures and bronze plaques erected on the University of Toronto Campus was dedicated to those of the Queen's Own Rifles of Canada regiment who were killed in action or who died from wounds defending her frontier in June 1866. The monument was erected by the Canadian Volunteer Monument Campaign of 1866, Committee of Toronto citizens and its chairman, Dr. McCaul, then President of the University of Toronto.

The North-West Rebellion of 1885 is remembered by the North-West Rebellion Monument in Queen's Park (east side of Queen's park Crescent), the Battleford Column tablet inside Moss Park Armoury and a cairn at Battleford, Saskatchewan.

The South African War memorial is on University Avenue. An additional tablet is inside Denison Armoury.

The First World War is commemorated by the Cross of Sacrifice and the shrine containing the Book of Remembrance at St Paul's Anglican Church. In addition, a tablet is mounted at Moss Park Armoury. The QOR dead are also remembered in The Buffs Memorial window, Warrior's Chapel, of Canterbury Cathedral.

A plaque was erected to the dead of the Second World War at the site of the D-Day landing, Bernières-sur-Mer, Normandy, France.

A tablet was also placed on a farm building at Mooshof, Germany, where Sergeant Aubrey Cosens, VC, earned his decoration.

There are also significant memorials at Le Mesnil-Patry, Anguerny, Anisy (France) and Wons, Rha, Sneek, Doorn, Oostburg, Zutphen (Netherlands). Other lesser memorials also exist.

== Order of precedence ==
Preceded by The Canadian Grenadier Guards	The Queen's Own Rifles of Canada	Succeeded by The Black Watch (Royal Highland Regiment) of Canada

== See also ==
- The Canadian Crown and the Canadian Forces
- Canadian Airborne Forces Association
- Queen's Own Rifles of Canada Band & Bugles
- Military history of Canada
- Parachute rigger
- Pathfinders (military)
- Toronto Armories

== Bibliography ==
- Chambers, Ernest J. (1901). The Queen's Own Rifles of Canada, a history of a splendid regiment's origin, development and services, including a story of patriotic duties well performed in three campaigns. Toronto: E.L. Ruddy.
- Illustrated Historical Album of the 2nd Battalion, the Queens Own Rifles of Canada, 1856–1894 by H. Bruce Brough (August 1, 2007)
- The Powder Horn 1963 : Chronicle of the Queen's Own Rifles of Canada by Col. JGK et al. Strathy (1966)
- At Duty's Call: Captain William Henry Victor Van Der Smissen, Queen's Own Rifles of Canada, and 3rd Battalion by Anonymous (September 7, 2010)
