= John Bayley (musician) =

- Born: c. 1847; Windsor, Berkshire, England
- Died: 1910 (aged 62–63)
- Occupation(s): Bandmaster, clarinettist, violinist, organist
- Instrument(s): Clarinet, violin, organ

John Bayley (circa 1847 – 1910) was an English bandmaster, clarinetist, violinist, and organist who was active in his native country and North America. Cornetist Herbert L. Clarke described him in his autobiography as "a finished musician of high order; he was a remarkable organist... and one of the best clarinetists I have ever heard in my life."

== Life and career ==
Born in Windsor, Berkshire, Bayley was named after his father, John Bayley (d 1871), a cornet soloist and conductor who was trained in Chelsea (London) at the Royal Military Asylum for boys. In 1850 the family immigrated to the United States, settling in Philadelphia. The family moved to San Francisco in 1857 and then a year later left there for Victoria, British Columbia in the enthusiasm of the Fraser Canyon Gold Rush.

In Victoria, Bayley Sr served as the city's inspector of police and was the first conductor of the Victoria Philharmonic Society (VPS). For the VPS's first concert on 6 May 1859 the younger Bayley performed as both a violinist and clarinet soloist. A 10 May 1859 Victoria Gazette review stated that his clarinet solo was "enthusiastically encored".

In 1861 the family returned to England, partly to provide Bayley Jr with superior music teachers than could be found in the United States. He entered the London Academy of Music where Leopold Jansa was his violin instructor and Henry Wylde taught him harmony. From 1869 to 1876 he served as bandmaster of the 46th (South Devonshire) Regiment of Foot.

In 1877 Bayley returned to Canada where he lived in Montreal through 1879. He served as bandmaster of The Queen's Own Rifles of Canada Band & Bugles in Toronto from 1879 to 1901 and was second violinist in the first Toronto String Quartette from 1884 to 1887. In 1887 he created a Citizens' Band which performed for one season on Toronto's Centre Island. He served for one year as first violin in the second Toronto String Quartette in 1894. He moved to Buffalo, New York after leaving the Queen's Own Rifles.
