= TSQ =

Names
- Preferred IUPAC name N-(6-Methoxyquinolin-8-yl)-4-methylbenzene-1-sulfonamide

Identifiers
CAS Number	109628-27-5
3D model (JSmol)	Interactive image
ChemSpider	115530
PubChem CID	130606
UNII	7SWW052N6R
CompTox Dashboard (EPA)	DTXSID00148996
- InChI: InChI=1S/C17H16N2O3S/c1-12-5-7-15(8-6-12)23(20,21)19-16-11-14(22-2)10-13-4-3-9-18-17(13)16/h3-11,19H,1-2H3 Key: HKRNYOZJJMFDBV-UHFFFAOYSA-N; InChI=1/C17H16N2O3S/c1-12-5-7-15(8-6-12)23(20,21)19-16-11-14(22-2)10-13-4-3-9-18-17(13)16/h3-11,19H,1-2H3 Key: HKRNYOZJJMFDBV-UHFFFAOYAJ
- SMILES: O=S(=O)(c1ccc(cc1)C)Nc2cc(OC)cc3cccnc23

Properties
Chemical formula	C_{17}H_{16}N_{2}O_{3}S
Molar mass	328.39 g·mol^{−1}
- Except where otherwise noted, data are given for materials in their standard state (at 25 °C [77 °F], 100 kPa). verify (what is ?) Infobox references

6-Methoxy-(8-p-toluenesulfonamido)quinoline (TSQ) is one of the most efficient fluorescent stains for zinc(II). It was introduced by Soviet biochemists Toroptsev and Eshchenko in the early 1970s. The popularity of TSQ as physiological stain rose after seminal works by Christopher Frederickson two decades later. TSQ forms a 2:1 (ligand-metal) complex with zinc and emits blue light upon excitation at 365 nanometers. TSQ has been extensively applied for determination of extracellular or intracellular levels of Zn^{2+} in biological systems, also to study Zn^{2+} in mossy fibers of the hippocampus.
