= Toronto String Quartette =

The Toronto String Quartette (TSQ) was the name of three un-related professional Canadian string quartets based in Toronto, Ontario.

== The first TSQ: 1884–1887 ==
The first Toronto String Quartette was formed in 1884 by the newly established Toronto Quartette Club (TQC), an organization dedicated to increasing public enthusiasm for chamber music. The original group consisted of violinists Henri Jacobsen and John Bayley, violist Carl Martens, and a Mr Kuhn on cello. The ensemble's first performances were in the winter of 1884 in a series of five concerts presented by the TQC. A similar concert series was mounted the following season with the quartet being joined by F.H. Torrington, A.E. Fisher, a Mr Haslam, and a Mr Daniels in performances of Mendelssohn's Octet for Strings among other works.

In the 1885–1886 season, this TSQ underwent some personnel changes with Fisher replacing Martens on the viola and Ludwig Corell assuming the role of cellist. That season the quartet presented a series of twelve popular concerts on Monday nights with repertoire including works by Ludwig van Beethoven, Joseph Haydn, and Robert Schumann among others. Also on the program were piano trios by Hummel and Reissiger with Martens on piano, the Mozart Clarinet Quintet with New York clarinetist Herr Kegel as a guest performer, and guest performances by Teresa Carreño and Emma Juch.

In spite of the TSQ's popularity, the group suffered from financial difficulties. In 1886, the Chamber Music Association (CMA) was established by music publisher Abraham Nordheimer among other Toronto citizens to ensure the quartet's continuation. The CMA sponsored the 1886–1887 season which included a series of six concerts at Shaftesbury Hall. Unfortunately, the ensemble did not survive beyond this season as Corell and Jacobsen both moved to the United States, forcing the quartet to dissolve in September 1887.

== The second TSQ: 1894 ==
The second Toronto String Quartette was a short-lived ensemble that performed in Toronto in 1894. John Bayley of the first TSQ was the group's first violinist with Messrs Anderson, Napolitano, and Dinelli rounding out the group. The group's performances were reviewed in the Musical Courier.

== The third TSQ: 1906 to mid-1920s ==
The third and final Toronto String Quartette was formed in 1906 with Frank Blachford as the first violin, Roland Roberts on second violin, violist Frank Converse Smith, and cellist Frederic Nicolai. The group gave its first performance on 23 January 1907. Blachford was the only member to stay with the group for its entire duration. Other members included second violinists Benedict Clarke (1914–1923), Erland Misener (1923), and Albert Aylward (1924); violists Alfred Bruce (1923) and Erland Misener (1924); and cellist Leo Smith (1914–mid-1920s). The group disbanded briefly for the 1916–1917 season but was then active again through at least 1925.

The TSQ performed an annual concert series in Toronto and toured to other cities and towns in Ontario. They also performed private concerts in the homes of wealthy people in Toronto, Buffalo, and other cities. In 1909, they gave a special concert for the Women’s Musical Club of Toronto. The ensemble performed a broad repertoire that encompassed classical, romantic, and 20th century works, including the Canadian premieres of works by Ernő Dohnányi, Edward Elgar, and Alexander Glazunov among others. A number of notable pianists appeared as guest artists with the quartet, including Ernest MacMillan, Paul Wells, Frank Welsman, and Healey Willan.
