= Arthur Elwell Fisher =

English composer, organist, violist, violinist and music educator

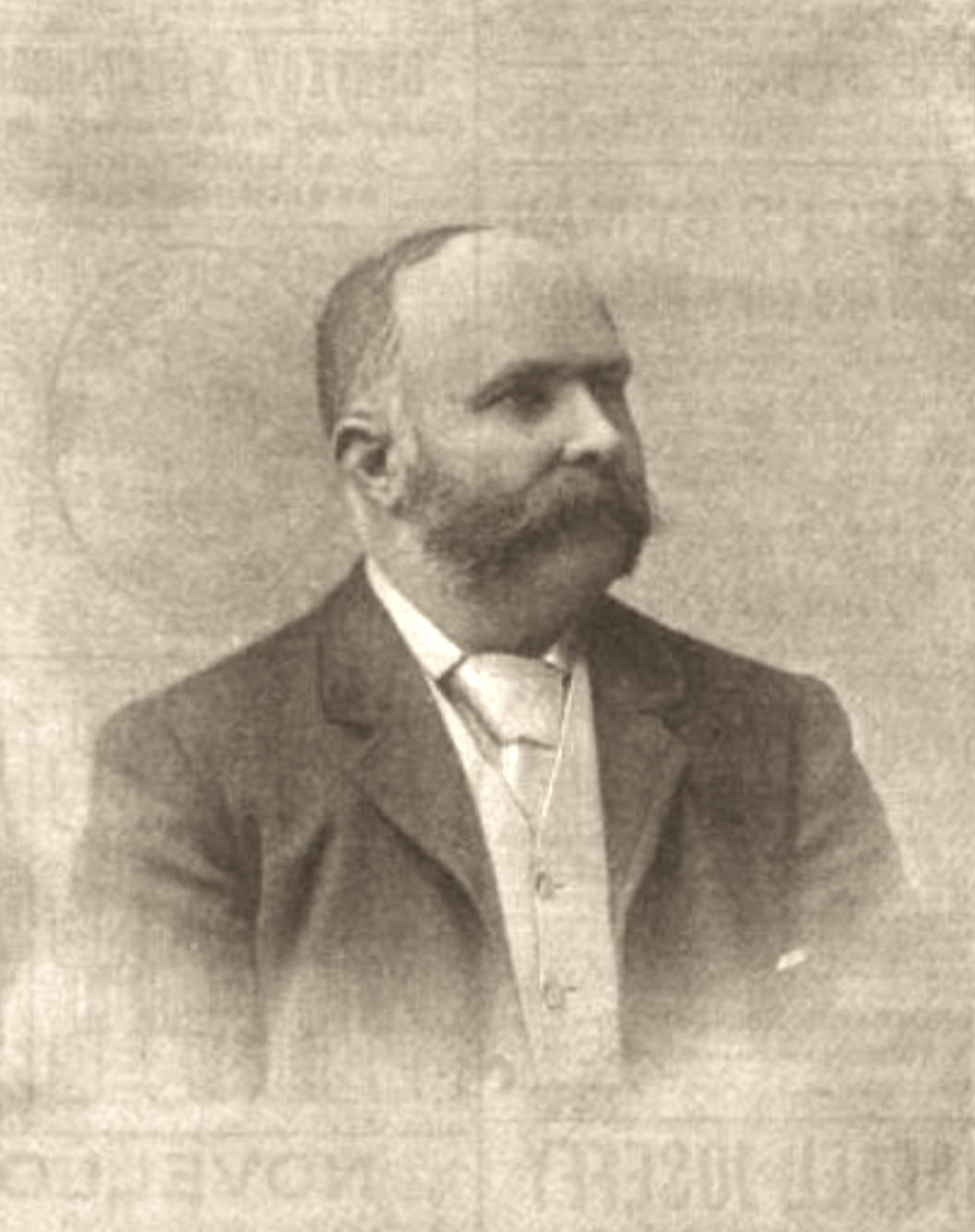
Arthur Elwell Fisher in 1890.

Arthur Elwell Fisher (29 May 1848 – 2 June 1914) was an English composer, organist, violist, violinist, and music educator who was primarily active in North America. His compositional output includes String Trio in G, Opus 54, a Rhapsody for violin and orchestra, a Thanksgiving Cantata, several works for solo piano and solo violin, choral works, and roughly 100 songs. His works were published in Canada by I. Suckling & Sons and A. & S. Nordheimer Co., in England by Ashdown, Curwen Press, and Novello, and in the United States by Century, Oliver Ditson and Company, G. Schirmer, and Summy-Birchard Music.

== Early life and education ==
Fisher was born in England. He studied the violin at the Conservatoire de Paris and with Henry Holmes (1839–1905) in London.

== Career ==
Fisher worked as a church organist in Liverpool during the 1870s. In 1879 he emigrated to Canada, and assumed the post of organist at St George's Church in Montreal, while giving organ lessons privately. He left there in 1882 to pursue studies at Trinity College in Toronto where he earned a Bachelor of Music in 1887. He also earned associates diplomas from Trinity College of Music and the Royal College of Organists in 1889 through visiting examiners from those schools to Canada. By this time he had composed and published a number of pieces of vocal music.

Fisher joined the music faculty of the Toronto Conservatory of Music (TCM) in 1887 where he taught courses in piano, violin, voice, and theory. He also taught similar courses at the Toronto College of Music, held several church organist posts in Toronto, founded the St Cecilia Choral Society of Toronto, and actively performed as a violist in the TCM's Toronto String Quartette. In 1887 he was appointed the TCM's first travelling examiner; officiating local examinations in Ontario and in Western Canada. From 1887 to 1890 he contributed numerous editorials and musical compositions the Musical Journal. Among his notable pupils was W. H. Hewlett. Music critic Hector Charlesworth described Fisher as "a man of profound learning, though still under the shadow of the cathedral, like most English musicians of the eighties."

Fisher's cantata for female choir and piano, The Wreck of the Hesperus, premiered in 1893 and the following year was rescored for performance by a mixed choir and orchestra for the opening festival of Massey Hall.

In 1893 Fisher resigned from his position at the TCM due to conflicts surrounding the terms of his contract with the school. He was appointed a music examiner at the University of Toronto in 1896 and that same year was made music director of the Kingston Ladies' College. Sometime during the first decade of the 20th century he joined the faculty of the Chicago Musical College where he was actively teaching up through 1912. He moved to Jacksonville, Mississippi, where he was connected with the St. Andrew's Episcopal Church, before falling ill and moving with his second wife to Hartford, Connecticut where they lived with her sister. He died in June 1914, aged 66, and was buried in Cedar Hill Cemetery.
