= Battalion Park =

Geoglyph site in Calgary, Alberta, Canada

Coordinates: 51°01′13″N 114°10′17″W

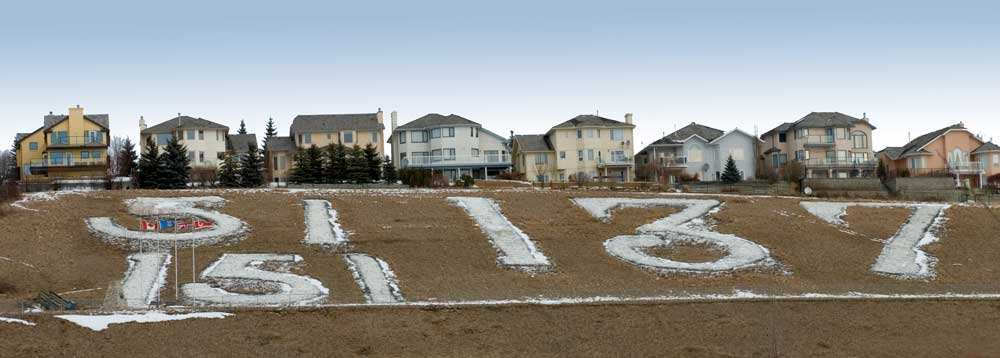
- Established: 3 November 1991
- Location: Calgary, Alberta, Canada on Signal Hill
- Type: geoglyphs
- Website: calgary.ca/CSPS/Parks/Pages/Locations/SW-parks/Battalion-Park.aspx

Battalion Park is a geoglyph site in southwest Calgary, Alberta, Canada. It is on Signal Hill, overlooking the Tsuu T'ina Nation (formerly Sarcee Nation), as well as lands formerly known as Camp Sarcee and later Sarcee Training Area, a military reserve used by the Canadian Forces from before the First World War up until the 1990s. The park extends over an area of 93 hectares (230 acres), north of the Elbow River. Its heritage value is associated with its dedication to the heroic efforts of Albertan soldiers during the First World War.

The site contains four geoglyphs formed of large, whitewashed stones, spelling out the numbers 137, 113, 151, and 51. The stones, totalling 16,000 in all, form the centrepiece of the park. Arranged on the side of the hill, and visible from various parts of the city, they represent the battalions numbered 137th, 113th, 151st, and 51st.

== Geography ==
The 93-hectare (230-acre) park on Signal Hill overlooks the Tsuutʼina Nation. It is north of the Elbow River, beside the Westhills shopping complex, on the city's western outskirts.

== History ==
=== Early history ===
The then-Sarcee Indian Reserve leased a part of their land in the summer of 1914 to the Canadian Militia to enable them to establish a prospective training site for military personnel. It was then known as Sarcee Camp (as it overlooks what was then called the Sarcee Nation), and it was an exclusive area in Alberta to provide training to the soldiers who were to be assigned to fight during the First World War. The military reserve was used by the Canadian Forces from before the First World War up until the 1990s. In all, 45,000 men were trained at the military camp. With this strength, the camp was the largest military training establishment in Canada during the war time. The 30 various units, housed in tents, included trainees drawn from various parts of the province. From Calgary, it took a day's ride to approach the camp.

Army engineers mapped the area. Each unit established its identity within its prescribed area by using stones that were hauled in sacks by hand from the river by soldiers as part of their training programme, over a distance of 2 kilometres (1.2 mi) during off-duty hours. Several military units collaborated in collecting the stones to create the battalion numerals. They were gathered from the river and carried it to the site as part of the training exercise. Among those who did so were the four battalions of the Canadian Expeditionary Force (Members of the Calgary, Lethbridge, Central Alberta, and Edmonton battalions) who were trained in the area.

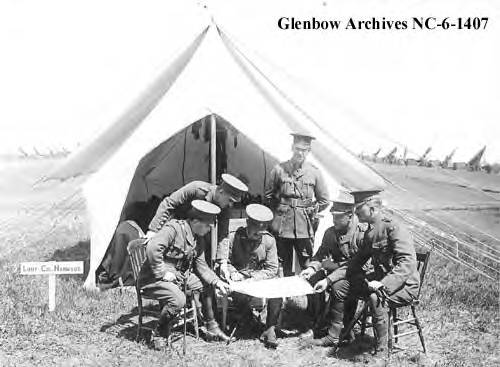
51st Battalion, Sarcee Army Camp in 1915

After their training was over, the battalions were assigned to war regions abroad to fight in the First World War. The 151st (Central Alberta) Battalion, raised in the Red Deer, Battle River, and South Edmonton districts, trained at the Sarcee Camp from December 22, 1915, until October 4, 1916; Lieutenant-Colonel J.W. Arnott commanded. The 137th (Calgary) Battalion, CEF, which was composed of the men of "Calgary's Own", were trained in the Sarcee Camp from December 1915 to August 1916; they were commanded by Lieutenant-Colonel George W. Morfitt. On August 21, 1916, they embarked to Europe to participate in the war. They were amalgamated with the 21st Reserve Battalion for service. Those men who survived the war met at the park, until the 1960s, to carry out weeding operations and also to repaint the stones of their battalion number which they had erected. The 113th Battalion (Lethbridge Highlanders), CEF, consisted of 883 men and officers who were trained at the Sarcee Camp from late May 1916 until September. The battalion used painted rocks to construct their battalion number on Signal Hill. The 51st Battalion (Edmonton), CEF, under the command of Colonel Harwood, was also at the Sarcee Army Camp, in 1915.

=== Later history ===
With the battalions gone, the numbers were almost forgotten, overgrown by shrubs and grass. Veterans of the 137th Battalion restored their number and painted it in 1965. The stones were almost obscured until a local historian found them; he found the stones prior to grading as part of a protection strategy for the hill which was subject to erosion, and to enable construction activity in the area. Getting the site its present historical status involved concerted efforts by the cadets of units, particularly of the 157th Battalion, stationed in Calgary; this effort stretched to several years of pursuing with the authorities. The stones were safely kept by Stewart Green Properties Ltd until they were restored. Development involved work on a gravel pit by Richmond Road, slope grading, rock replacement, and stairs construction. Battalion Park officially opened on 3 November 1991.

The 51st Battalion is perpetuated by an existing reserve unit, the Loyal Edmonton Regiment. The 137th Battalion is perpetuated by another reserve unit, the King's Own Calgary Regiment (RCAC). The 151st Battalion was perpetuated by the North Alberta Regiment, which disbanded in 1936, and the 113th Battalion (Lethbridge Highlanders) is perpetuated by the South Alberta Light Horse.

== Features ==
The glyphs, which form the centre piece of the park, are large whitewashed stones arranged on the side of the hill. They represent the battalion numbers 137, 113, 151, and 51. The serif-type numerals were created using 16,000 stones. While the numerals 137, 151, and 51 are in a cluster, the glyph representing number "113" is further away in an undisturbed state as made in-situ initially from July 1, 1916, to August 31, 1916, but located within the park. Number "113" is at its original location, on a high ridge, while the others had to be shifted from their original location to the present site because of the need to develop the area for roads and other economic activities. The glyph with number "113" is on 0.265 hectares (0.65 acres) area of land on a high ridge, and each numeral of "113" measures 36.5 metres (120 ft) in length and 1.8–3.7 metres (5 ft 11 in – 12 ft 2 in) in width. The number is made up of white-painted stones. The park consists of a walkway up the hill along paths, boardwalks, wooden staircases equipped with bicycle ramps and a "lookout landing". Along the walkway are a dozen interpretive signs about the numerals and various aspects of WW1.

== Commemoration ==
In a homage paid by 104 cadets who gathered at the Battalion Park Monument, a plaque was erected as dedication to their ancestors who were part of the action during 1915 and 1916 in the First World War. The names of the battalions are mentioned on the plaque. On this occasion they also painted the stones which mark the numbers of the battalions. The units involved in its assembly, mentioned on the plaque, are: 85 RCSCC Calgary, 604 Moose Squadron RCAC, 22 Undaunted RGSCC, 781 Calgary Squadron, RCAC 1292 LdSH (RC), RCACC 2554, PPCLI CC 1955, Service Battalion RCACC, Buffalo Squadron 538, RCAC 2509, Royal Cdn Signals, CC 2137 Calgary Highlanders, and CC 52 City of Calgary Squadron RCAC.

Members of the King's Own Calgary Regiment (RCAC), who perpetuate the 137th (Calgary) Battalion CEF, commemorate the sacrifices of their comrades each Remembrance Day by sending a contingent to the memorial and conducting a ceremony of remembrance.

== See also ==
- Military history of Canada
- Fovant Badges
- Hillside letters
