= 103rd Regiment (Calgary Rifles) =

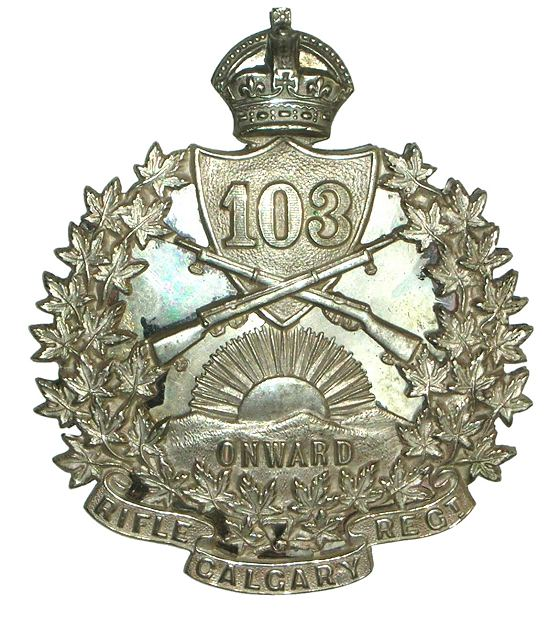
- 103rd Calgary Rifles cross-belt badge. Two part, sterling silver badge consisting of a cast front badge and a rear plate with maker's mark, "JR Gaunt Montreal". Badge was affixed to the cross-belt with four screw-down lugs.
- Active: 1910–1920
- Disbanded: 1920
- Country: Canada
- Branch: Non-Permanent Active Militia
- Role: Rifle regiment
- Part of: Military District No. 13 (unbrigaded)
- Garrison/HQ: Calgary
- Patron: Honorary Colonel R.B. Bennett
- Equipment: Ross rifle

Commanders
- Notable commanders: Lt-Col. William Charles Gordon Armstrong

The 103rd Regiment (Calgary Rifles) was an infantry regiment of the Canadian Non-Permanent Active Militia, authorized at Calgary, Alberta, Canada, by General Order on 1 April 1910.

== History ==
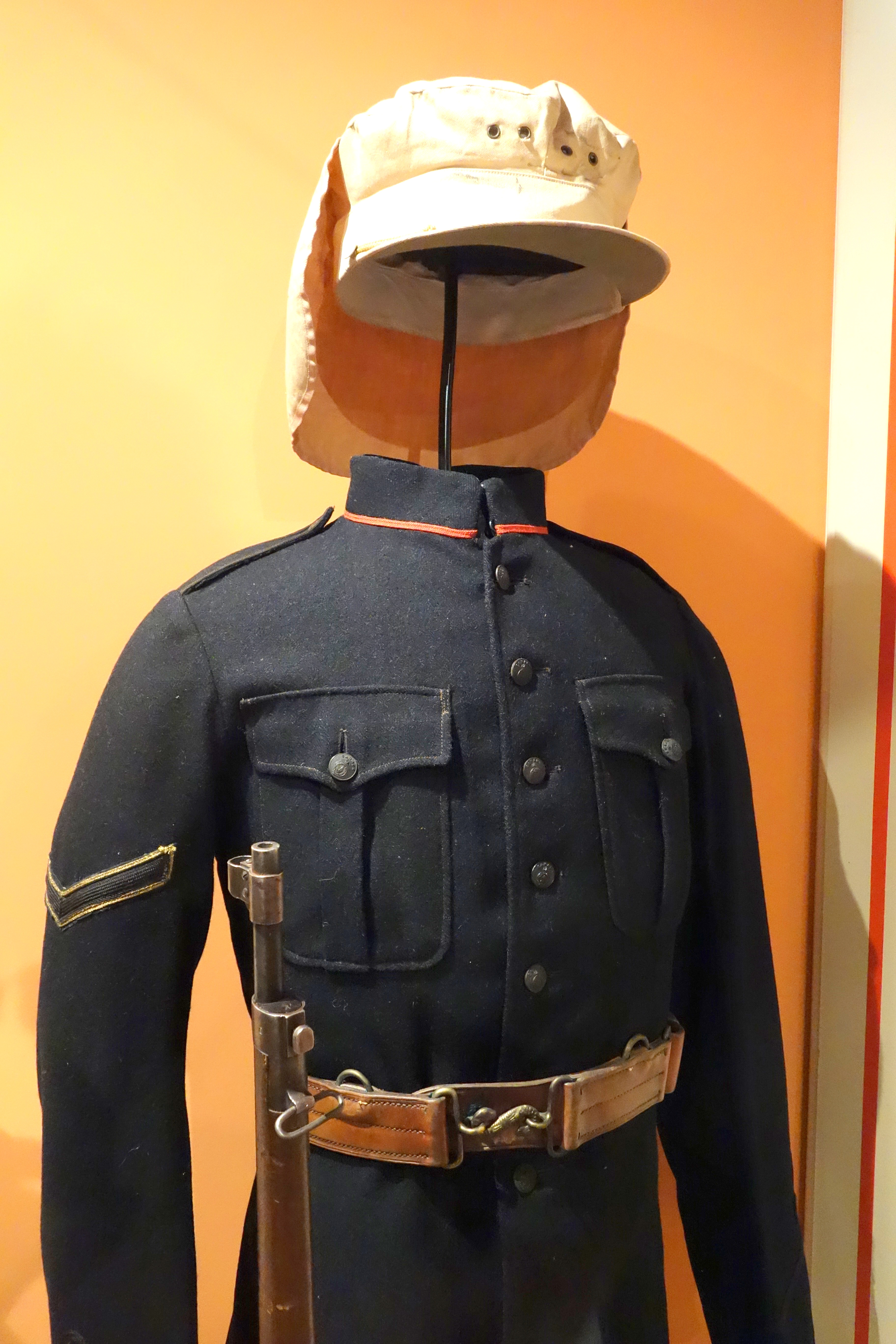
Field dress uniform for members of the 103rd Regiment, 1912.

The 103rd Regiment was raised in Calgary as a militia unit. The first commanding officer was Lieutenant-Colonel W.C.G. Armstrong. The regiment was approved to train six companies of 50 men each, and later expanded to eight companies.

The unit initially paraded at the former Calgary General Hospital building (today known as the Rundle Ruins) before being ordered to vacate in September 1910. The unit then moved into the former drill hall of the Canadian Mounted Rifles on Centre Street and 12th Avenue SE. In 1911 a new armoury was found, in a former German-Canadian club a block south of their former home at the General Hospital. After Mewata Armouries was completed during the First World War, the regiment moved its offices to that location.

== War Service ==
At the outbreak of World War I the regiment was not mobilized but served as a recruiting depot to raise battalions for the Canadian Expeditionary Force (CEF), the first being the 10th Battalion, CEF. The regiment also provided soldiers to man the internment camp at Castle Mountain. These soldiers were also employed full time as part of the Active Militia. A number of reinforcement battalions were commanded by former 103rd Regiment officers, including Lieutenant-Colonel William Charles Gordon Armstrong (56th Battalion (Calgary), CEF) and Lieutenant-Colonel George Morfitt (137th (Calgary) Battalion, CEF).

The regiment also supplied soldiers to man internment camps near Castle Mountain and Cave & Basin in Banff National Park. Three soldiers of the 103rd Regiment (Calgary Rifles) died while assigned to the camp and are buried in Banff.

== Reorganization ==
The 103rd Regiment was reorganized into two regiments in 1920 (the Calgary Regiment and The Alberta Regiment), each of which was reorganized into two regiments a few years later. None of the new units adopted the rifle regiment traditions of the 103rd.

== Perpetuations ==
One of the resulting four regiments (the North Alberta Regiment) was disbanded in the 1936 reorganization of the Militia, but three present-day regiments claim descent from the 103rd: the South Alberta Light Horse, the King's Own Calgary Regiment (RCAC) and the Calgary Highlanders. These regiments perpetuate the 10th, 31st, 50th, 56th, 82nd, 89th and 137th Battalions of the Canadian Expeditionary Force all of whom were either raised in, or contained soldiers from, Calgary.

Descendants of the 103rd Regiment "Calgary Rifles"

Lineage

1910 | 103rd Regt "Calgary Rifles"
1920 | 1st Bn, The Calgary Regt | 2nd Bn, The Calgary Regt | The Alberta Regiment
1921 | 1st Bn, Calgary Highlanders, The Calgary Regt | 1st Bn, The Alberta Regt | 2nd Bn, The Alberta Regt
1924 | The Calgary Highlanders | The Calgary Regt | The South Alberta Regiment | The North Alberta Regt
1936 | The Calgary Regt (Tank) | Disbanded
1940 | 2nd (Reserve) Bn, The Calgary Highlanders | 2nd (Reserve) Bn, The South Alberta Regt
1941 | 14th (Reserve) Army Tank Bn, (The Calgary Regt (Tank))
1942 | 14th (Reserve) Army Tank Regt, (The Calgary Regt (Tank)) | 2nd (Reserve) Bn, The South Alberta Regt (MG)
1945 | The Calgary Highlanders
1946 | 14th Armoured Regt (King's Own Calgary Regt) | The South Alberta Regt
1949 | The King's Own Calgary Regt (14th Armoured Regt)
1954 | The South Alberta Light Horse (29th Armoured Regt)
1958 | The King's Own Calgary Regt (RCAC) | The South Alberta Light Horse
2026

== Regimental Histories ==
- Calgary's Infantry Regiment: A Pictorial History of The Calgary Highlanders by Michael A. Dorosh (Calgary Highlanders Regimental Funds Foundation, 2024) 440 pages ISBN 978-0-969461-64-7
