= South Alberta Regiment =

Canadian military unit (1924–1954)

- Active: 1924–1954
- Country: Canada
- Branch: Canadian Militia (1924–1940); Canadian Army (1940–1954)
- Type: Line infantry
- Role: Infantry (1924–1942, 1945–1954); Armour (1942–1945)
- Size: Regiment
- Part of: Non-Permanent Active Militia (1924–1940); 4th Canadian (Armoured) Division (1940–1945); Royal Canadian Infantry Corps (1945–1954)
- Garrison/HQ: Medicine Hat, Alberta
- March: "A Southerly Wind and a Cloudy Sky"
- Engagements: Second World War
- Battle honours: See #Battle Honours

The South Alberta Regiment (SAR) was a regiment of the Canadian Army that existed from 1924 to 1954. Originally infantry, in February 1942 it became an armoured unit. During World War II the Regiment fought from July 1944 to May 1945 in France, Belgium, the Netherlands, and Germany.

== History ==
=== Early history ===
The regiment was created in 1924 as infantry after The Alberta Regiment was split into two separate regiments: The North Alberta Regiment (disbanded in 1936) and The South Alberta Regiment.

=== Second World War ===
The South Alberta Regiment mobilized in 1940 as part of the 4th Canadian Infantry Division. When the division was reorganized as an armoured formation to satisfy demand for a second Canadian armoured division, the South Alberta Regiment was named 29th Armoured Regiment (The South Alberta Regiment) and received Ram tanks in February 1942. The unit was again renamed as 29th Armoured Reconnaissance Regiment (The South Alberta Regiment) in January 1943.

The SAR was deployed to northern France in mid-June 1944 (Normandy landings, D-Day was 6 June 1944), replacing their Ram tanks to be equipped with Stuart and Sherman tanks. They participated in the later battles of the Invasion of Normandy, taking part in Operation Totalize and finally closing the Falaise pocket in Operation Tractable. The South Albertas went on to participate in the liberation of the Netherlands and the Battle of the Scheldt.

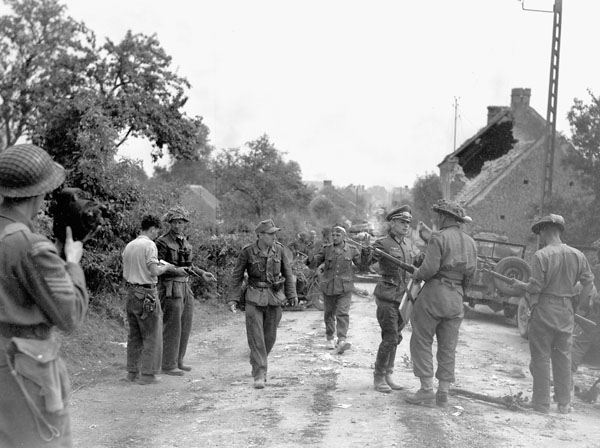
Major Currie (left, with pistol in hand) of the South Alberta Regiment accepting the surrender of German troops at Saint-Lambert-sur-Dives, France, 19 August 1944.

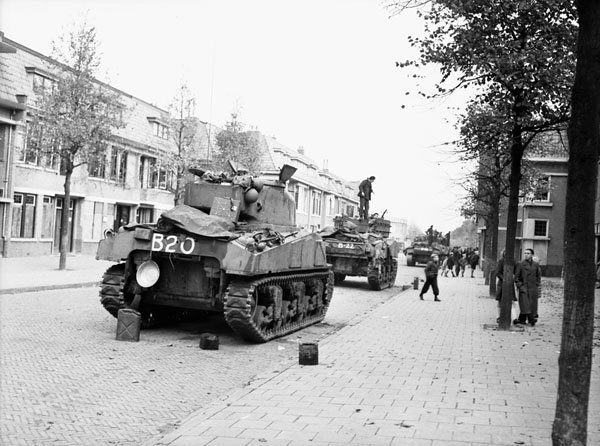
Sherman tanks of the South Alberta Regiment in recently liberated Bergen op Zoom, 29 October 1944

In January 1945, they took part in the Battle for the Kapelsche Veer. They spent the last weeks of the war fighting in northern Germany.

Major David Vivian Currie of the SAR received the Victoria Cross for his actions near Saint-Lambert-sur-Dives, as the allies attempted to seal off the Falaise pocket. Currie was one of only 16 Canadians to receive the Victoria Cross during World War II. It was the only Victoria Cross awarded to a Canadian soldier during the Normandy campaign, and the only Victoria Cross ever awarded to a member of the Royal Canadian Armoured Corps. Lieutenant Donald I. Grant took a photograph of the event that would become one of the most famous images of the War (see at left). Historian C. P. Stacey called it "as close as we are ever likely to come to a photograph of a man winning the Victoria Cross."

The Freedom of the City was exercised by the South Alberta Regiment in Nanaimo, British Columbia, in April, 1941.

The SAR is now incorporated by amalgamation in the reserve reconnaissance regiment the South Alberta Light Horse.

== Perpetuations ==
=== Great War ===
- 31st Battalion (Alberta), CEF
- 113th Battalion (Lethbridge Highlanders), CEF
- 175th (Medicine Hat) Battalion, CEF
- 187th (Central Alberta) Battalion, CEF

== Lineage ==
The South Alberta Regiment descended from the Calgary Rifles, which had been raised in 1910. In 1920 the Rifles split into two new regiments, the Calgary Regiment and the Alberta Regiment. In 1924 the Alberta Regiment again divided, forming the South Alberta Regiment and the North Alberta Regiment. The North Albertas disbanded in 1936 while the South Albertas continued through World War II.

Lineage of the South Alberta Regiment

1914	31st Bn, CEF
1915	113th "Overseas" Bn, CEF
1916	Absorbed by 17th Reserve Bn	175th "Overseas" Bn, CEF	187th "Overseas" Bn, CEF
1917	Absorbed by 21st Reserve Bn	Absorbed by 21st Reserve Bn
1920	Disbanded
1920	1st Bn (31st Bn, CEF), The Alberta Regt	3rd Bn (113th Bn, CEF), (Note: Reserve) The Alberta Regt	5th Bn (175th Bn, CEF), The Alberta Regt	6th Bn (187th Bn, CEF), The Alberta Regt	2nd Bn (89th Bn, CEF), The Alberta Regt
1921	2nd Bn (31st Bn, CEF), (Note: Non Permanent Active Milita) The Alberta Regt
1924	1st Bn (31st Bn, CEF), The South Alberta Regt	2nd Bn (113th Bn, CEF), The South Alberta Regt	3rd Bn (175th Bn, CEF), The South Alberta Regt	4th Bn (187th Bn, CEF), The South Alberta Regt	The North Alberta Regt
1936	The South Alberta Regt	Disbanded	Disbanded	Disbanded	Disbanded
1940	The South Alberta Regt, CASF
1940	1st Bn, The South Alberta Regt, CASF	2nd (Reserve) Bn, The South Alberta Regt
1942	29th Armd Regt (The South Alberta Regt), CAC, CASF	2nd (Reserve) Bn, The South Alberta Regt (MG)
1943	29th Armd Recce Regt (The South Alberta Regt), CAC, CASF
1945	29th Armd Recce Regt (The South Alberta Regt), RCAC, CASF
1946	Disbanded	The South Alberta Regt
68th LAA Regt, RCA	41st Anti-Tank Regt (Self Propelled), RCA
1954	The South Alberta LH (29th Armd Regt)

== Battle honours ==
=== Great War honours ===
- Mount Sorrel (Note: Selected to be borne on colours and appointments)
- Somme, 1916, '18
- Flers–Courcelette
- Thiepval
- Ancre Heights
- Ancre, 1916
- Arras, 1917, '18
- Vimy, 1917
- Arleux
- Scarpe, 1917, '18
- Hill 70
- Ypres, 1917
- Passchendaele
- Amiens
- Drocourt–Quéant
- Hindenburg Line
- Canal du Nord
- Cambrai, 1918
- Pursuit to Mons
- France and Flanders, 1915–18

=== Second World War honours ===
- Falaise
- Falaise Road
- The Laison
- St Lambert-sur-Dives
- Moerbrugge
- The Scheldt
- Woensdrecht
- The Lower Maas
- Kapelsche Veer
- The Rhineland
- The Hochwald
- Veen
- Twente Canal
- Bad Zwischenahn
- North-West Europe, 1944–1945
