= William Strang (footballer) =

Scottish footballer

Personal information
- Date of birth: 16 September 1878
- Place of birth: Dunfermline, Scotland
- Date of death: 7 October 1916 (aged 38)
- Place of death: Rouen, France
- Height: 5 ft 11 1/2 in (1.82 m)
- Position: Full back

Youth career
- Wallsend
- 1897–1899: Dunfermline Athletic

Senior career*
Years	Team	Apps	(Gls)
1899–????	Orion		
1903–1905	Celtic	2	(0)
1903	→ Renton (loan)		
1909	Calgary Callies	0	(0)
- * Club domestic league appearances and goals

William Strang (16 September 1878 – 7 October 1916) was a Scottish professional footballer who played in the Scottish League for Celtic as a full back. He was described as a "robust full back with a lusty kick."

== Personal life ==
Strang emigrated with his family to Calgary, Canada in 1905 and worked as a printer. On 21 August 1915, a year after the outbreak of the First World War, Strang enlisted as a private in the 56th Battalion of the Canadian Expeditionary Force, falsifying his age to appear two years younger. He landed with the 31st Battalion in France in July 1916 and was promoted to the rank of acting lance corporal on 22 September 1916, while he was serving on the Somme. Strang was wounded in the head shortly after his promotion and died of wounds in Rouen on 7 October 1916. He was buried in St Sever Cemetery, Rouen.

== Career statistics ==
Appearances and goals by club, season and competition
Club	Season	League			National Cup		Total	
Club	Season	Division	Apps	Goals	Apps	Goals	Apps	Goals
Celtic	1903–04	Scottish First Division	2	0	0	0	2	0
Calgary Callies	1909	Calgary League	0	0	1	0	1	0
Career total			2	0	1	0	3	0
