= Nelson Spencer =

Canadian politician

Nelson Spencer DSO
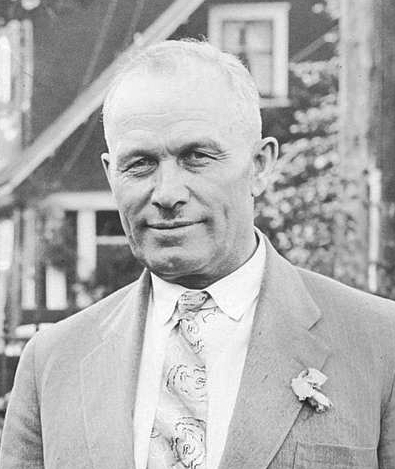
- Spencer pictured c. 1931

MLA for Vancouver City
- In office 1928–1933

MLA for Medicine Hat
- In office 1913–1921
- Preceded by: Charles R. Mitchell
- Succeeded by: Perren Baker; William Johnston

Personal details
- Born: 7 December 1876 York County, New Brunswick, Canada
- Died: 30 September 1943 (aged 66) Vancouver, British Columbia, Canada
- Party: Conservative
- Military career
- Allegiance: Canada
- Branch: Canadian Expeditionary Force; Non-Permanent Active Militia
- Rank: Lieutenant-colonel
- Commands: 175th Battalion, CEF; 31st Battalion, CEF; 1st Battalion, The Alberta Regiment

Nelson Charles Spencer, DSO (7 December 1876 – 30 September 1943) was a Canadian merchant, provincial politician from Alberta, and lieutenant-colonel with the Canadian Expeditionary Force (CEF) during World War I.

== Biography ==
Spencer was born in York County, New Brunswick, to Amelia Caroline (née Price) and William Spencer, and raised at Bloomfield Ridge, Stanley Parish.

A Conservative in party allegiance, Nelson Spencer was an Orangeman, and in 1910, he belonged to Carnduff, Saskatchewan, Loyal Orange Lodge No.1561 where he served as the County Master for that jurisdiction. Later, he transferred to 'Medicine Hat' L.O.L. 1549.

Spencer first served in municipal politics, serving as mayor of Medicine Hat, Alberta, from 1912 to 1914.

Spencer was elected to the Alberta Legislature in the 1913 Alberta general election to fill the Medicine Hat seat. He defeated the Liberal cabinet minister Charles R. Mitchell in an upset victory by 10 votes. Mitchell was the only cabinet minister defeated in that election.

Spencer retained his seat in the 1917 Alberta general election under section 38 of the Elections Act that stipulated that an incumbent MLA engaged in duty with the Canadian Forces in World War I would be automatically returned to his district without an election. Spencer retired from the legislature after two terms in office and did not run for re-election in 1921.

Spencer belonged to the 21st Alberta Hussars prior to the Great War of 1914–1919. During the war, he was given command of the newly created 175th 'Medicine Hat' Battalion and appointed to the rank of lieutenant-colonel. The unit was later broken up to reinforce other units at the front. He commanded the 31st 'Alberta' Battalion from October 6 to December 1, 1918. For his war service, he was awarded the Distinguished Service Order, and after the war, he returned to the militia as commanding officer of the 1st Battalion, the Alberta Regiment, in Medicine Hat.

Spencer ran for a seat in the Canadian House of Commons as the Conservative candidate in a 1921 by-election in the Medicine Hat federal electoral district held after the death of Arthur Lewis Sifton. Spencer was badly defeated in a landslide by Robert Gardiner.

After his electoral defeat, Spencer moved to British Columbia and ran in the 1928 British Columbia general election. He was elected in the riding of Vancouver City and spent one term in office for the British Columbia Conservative Party. Spencer later ran as an independent for mayor of Vancouver after losing the Non-Partisan Association nomination in 1937.

Spencer was married to Martha Alberta Kennedy (15 June 1878 – 21 June 1958).

He died in Vancouver, British Columbia at the age of 66, and is interred at Ocean View Burial Park in Burnaby, British Columbia.

Legislative Assembly of Alberta
Preceded by Charles R. Mitchell	MLA Medicine Hat; 1913–1921	Succeeded by Perren Baker; William Johnston
