= Battle for the Kapelsche Veer =

1945 World War II battle in the Netherlands

Coordinates: 51°43′N 4°59′E

Operation Elephant
- Part of the Western Front of 1944–45 in the European theatre of World War II
Date	26–31 January 1945
Location	Kapelsche Veer, Netherlands
Result	Allied victory

Belligerents
Canada	Germany

Strength
The Lincoln and Welland Regiment; The Argyll and Sutherland Highlanders of Canada The South Alberta Regiment	small Fallschirmjäger garrison

Casualties and losses
300 casualties	103 killed, wounded or captured

The Battle for the Kapelsche Veer, also known as Operation Elephant took place between 26–31 January 1945. It was fought between the German Wehrmacht and allied troops at the Kapelsche Veer – a ferry crossing of the River Meuse near the village of Capelle in the province North Brabant of the Netherlands. The Wehrmacht had occupied the Netherlands since May 1940, having conquered the country during the Battle of France. As a result of the battle, both countries had casualties of over 1,000 men (dead, missing, wounded, or in war captivity).

Commander of the First British Corps, General John Crocker, intended for this German bridgehead to be overwhelmed at any cost. The last part of the battle was "Operation Elephant", the code-name of an Allied operation against paratroopers holding a ferry crossing on the Maas river at Kapelsche Veer. Allied regiments in Operation Elephant were the Lincoln and Welland Regiment, the Argyll and Sutherland Highlanders of Canada, and the South Alberta Regiment tanks (elements of the Fourth Canadian Armored Division). The small ferry slip was defended heavily and the allies suffered 300 casualties before winning.

The 'Official Summary of the Canadian Army' writes (p. 244f.):

During the days of this threat on the Maas, there was one of the strangest episodes of the campaign. In a heavily water-logged area north-east of Breda, a subsidiary channel of the Maas forms along the river's south shore, a long island, amid a ferry crossing and harbor called Kapelsche Veer. The German General provided training and battle inoculation to his young paratroopers, which were replaced every three or four days. The Germans dug themselves in with remarkable thoroughness, and eliminating this foothold was a long, cold, and costly business involving attacking across the open and snow-covered ground in the face of a determined enemy. The Poles tried it in the last days of December and again on 7 January 1945, both times without success.

The 47th Royal Marine Commando, under Polish command, attacked the place on 13 and 14 January (Operation HORSE) with no better result. Finally, the Fourth Canadian Armored Division mounted a very considerable attack (Operation ELEPHANT) against the position with ample artillery support and tanks. Still, there were five icy days of thoroughly nasty fighting--the phrase of the 10th Brigade's historian is "sheer misery"--before it was reported on 31 January that all enemy south of the Maas had been liquidated. The brunt was borne by the Lincoln and Welland Regiment, assisted by the Argyll and Sutherland Highlanders and South Alberta Regiment tanks. The Germans had lost 145 killed, 64 wounded, and 34 prisoners throughout all of January. The tough young paratroopers had received in the end a rather more severe lesson in the art of war than Student had intended.

This was the finale of the "static" period of winter warfare. The Watch on the Maas had involved few operations on such a scale. It had, however, meant unremitting vigilance, constant patrolling (including many incursions across the river into the enemy country), and frequent raids: all under the most wretched conditions of ground and weather. Now major operations under equally difficult circumstances were impending. Rundstedt's Ardennes thrust had been broken and his armored reserves decimated, but the Germans showed no sign of withdrawing beyond the Rhine. With the 30th Corps again becoming available, active preparations for the offensive between Mass and Rhine were resumed; and on 8 February 1945 began the series of battles which was to produce in three months the total downfall of the Third Reich.

== Sources ==
- The Battle of the Scheldt and the Winter on the Maas - Official Summary of the Canadian Army
- Article about a Canadian Soldier who took part in that battle
- bbs.keyhole.com
- canadiansoldiers.com article
- www.canada.ca
