= North Alberta Regiment =

- Active: 1924–1936
- Country: Canada
- Branch: Canadian Militia
- Type: Line infantry
- Role: Infantry
- Size: 4 battalions (1 active, 3 on paper)
- Part of: Non-Permanent Active Militia
- Garrison/HQ: Killam, Alberta
- Battle honours: See #Battle Honours

The North Alberta Regiment was an infantry regiment of the Non-Permanent Active Militia of the Canadian Militia (now the Canadian Army). In 1936, the regiment was disbanded as a result of a country-wide reorganization of the Canadian Militia.

== Lineage ==
=== The North Alberta Regiment ===
- Originated on 1 April 1910, in Calgary, Alberta, as the 103rd Regiment (Calgary Rifles).
- Reorganized on 15 March 1920, as two separate regiments: The Calgary Regiment (now The King's Own Calgary Regiment (RCAC) and The Calgary Highlanders (10th Canadians)) and The Alberta Regiment.
- Reorganized on 15 May 1924, into two separate regiments: The South Alberta Regiment and The North Alberta Regiment.
- Disbanded on 1 February 1936.

== Perpetuations ==
=== Great War ===
- 31st Battalion (Alberta), CEF
- 151st (Central Alberta) Battalion, CEF
- 191st (Southern Alberta) Battalion, CEF
- 192nd (Crow's Nest Pass) Battalion, CEF

After the reorganization of The Alberta Regiment in 1924, the perpetuation of the 31st Battalion, CEF was shared by both The North Alberta Regiment and The South Alberta Regiment.

== History ==
The North Alberta Regiment was first authorized on 15 March 1924 when The Alberta Regiment was reorganized and split into two separate regiments, The North Alberta Regiment and The South Alberta Regiment (now part of the South Alberta Light Horse). The perpetuations of CEF units granted to The Alberta Regiment were split among both new regiments.

It was headquartered at Killam and had companies at Camrose, Killam, Hardisty and Sedgewick.

On 1 February 1936, The North Alberta Regiment was disbanded along with 13 other regiments as part of the 1936 Canadian Militia reorganization.

== Organization ==
=== 1st Battalion, The North Alberta Regiment (15 May 1924) ===
- Regimental Headquarters
- A Company
- B Company
- C Company
- D Company

=== Reserve battalions ===
The 2nd, 3rd and 4th Battalions existed only on paper.

== Battle Honours ==
- Mount Sorrel (Note: Selected to be borne on colours and appointments)
- Somme, 1916, '18
- Flers–Courcelette
- Thiepval
- Ancre Heights
- Arras, 1917, '18
- Vimy, 1917
- Arleux
- Scarpe, 1917, '18
- Hill 70
- Ypres, 1917
- Passchendaele
- Amiens
- Drocourt–Quéant
- Hindenburg Line
- Canal du Nord
- Cambrai, 1918
- Pursuit to Mons
- France and Flanders, 1915–18
