= 192nd (Crow's Nest Pass) Battalion, CEF =

192nd Battalion, CEF
- Active: 1916–1917
- Country: Canada
- Branch: Canadian Expeditionary Force
- Type: Infantry
- Battle honours: The Great War, 1916

Commanders
- Officer commanding: LCol H. E. Lyon

The 192nd Battalion, CEF, was a unit in the Canadian Expeditionary Force during the First World War. Authorization published in General Order 69 to recruit the 192nd Battalion was issued on 15 July 1916. Organization of the battalion took place in Blairmore, Alberta, and the surrounding district in January 1916 under the command of Lieutenant-Colonel Henry Edward Lyon. The total strength of the 192nd Battalion was 23 officers and 424 soldiers of other ranks. The 192nd Battalion embarked from Halifax 1 November 1916 aboard the RMS Empress of Britain and disembarked in England 10 days later on the 11th. After sailing to England in November 1916, the battalion was absorbed into the 9th Reserve Battalion on November 12, 1916. They were disbanded by Privy Council Order 2702 on 12 October 1917.

Perpetuation of the 192nd Battalion was assigned to the North Alberta Regiment in 1924. The North Albertas disbanded in 1936.

In 1929, the battalion was awarded the theatre of war honour The Great War, 1916.
