= 113th Battalion (Lethbridge Highlanders), CEF =

113th "Overseas" Battalion, CEF
- Active: 1915–1916
- Disbanded: 1917
- Country: Canada
- Branch: Canadian Expeditionary Force
- Type: Highland infantry
- Mobilization headquarters: Lethbridge
- Battle honours: The Great War, 1916

Commanders
- Officer commanding: LCol Albert Westhead Pryce-Jones

The 113th Battalion (Lethbridge Highlanders), CEF, was an infantry battalion of the Great War Canadian Expeditionary Force. The 113th Battalion was authorized on 22 December 1915 as part of a recruiting drive in which men from the same region could enlist and serve together.

Signal Hill, Calgary, with painted stones placed by soldiers from Lethbridge (113) who trained in Calgary in early 1916 before embarking for Europe in September 1916

The battalion trained on the Lethbridge exhibition grounds in 1915.

113th Battalion portrait, Lethbridge exhibition grounds, Lethbridge AB

The rank-and-file soldiers were not issued Highland kit, but the battalion did raise three pipes and drums bands who were. Basic training in the CEF involved rifle training, bombing or hand grenade practice, route marches, rifle drill and many inspections. Inspections were very popular for the 113th as many wished to hear their three bands.

In late May 1916, the battalion moved to Sarcee Camp outside Calgary for further training that lasted until September. During the time spent at Sarcee the battalion used painted rocks to construct their battalion number on nearby Signal Hill in Calgary. This bold white stone is still visible and preserved in Battalion Park. In early September 1916 orders came for the battalion to entrain for the east and by September 19 the battalion was on its way.

Walter James of Gleichen, Alberta, in his uniform; he served with the 113th Battalion (Lethbridge Highlanders.) James survived the war.

On September 26, 1916, the 113th embarked along with the 111th and 145th Battalions on SS Tuscania, a transport ship. The trip across the Atlantic took ten days and upon arriving in England the battalion was taken to a holding camp at Sandling near Shorncliffe. It was at Sandling that Lieutenant-Colonel Albert Westhead Pryce-Jones, the commanding officer, learned that the 113th would be broken up for replacements and would not see action as a unit after all. One can only imagine the disappointment of these men as they learned the fate of the 113th, their battalion, after 10 months training together.

The 113th was transferred to the 17th Reserve Battalion, CEF, the Nova Scotia Highlanders, affiliated with the Scottish Seaforth Highlanders. The 17th was at Bramshott Camp located South of London. On October 12, 1916, most of the old 113th proceeded to France arriving at a camp near Le Havre France. Almost immediately 300 men of the old 113th were assigned as replacements to one of the most famous battalions in the CEF, the 16th Battalion (Canadian Scottish). An idea of the casualties suffered by the 16th in the Somme fighting of the fall of 1916 until 1917 can be understood by this reinforcement. This would mean that roughly 30% of the 16th were new transfers from the 113th.

The battalion disbanded on 1 September 1917.

The battalion recruited in, and was mobilized at, Lethbridge, Alberta.

The battalion was commanded by Lieutenant-Colonel Albert Westhead Pryce-Jones from 6 to 8 October 1916.

The battalion was awarded the battle honour The Great War, 1916.

The perpetuation of the 113th Battalion was assigned in 1920 to the 3rd Battalion, the Alberta Regiment. When the Alberta Regiment was split in 1924, the perpetuation was passed to the 2nd Battalion, the South Alberta Regiment. The South Alberta Regiment is now incorporated (through amalgamations) with the South Alberta Light Horse, which carries on the perpetuation.

== Sources ==
Canadian Expeditionary Force 1914–1919 by Col. G.W.L. Nicholson, CD, Queen's Printer, Ottawa, Ontario, 1962
