= 175th (Medicine Hat) Battalion, CEF =

175th "Overseas" Battalion, CEF
- Active: 1916–1917
- Country: Canada
- Branch: Canadian Expeditionary Force
- Type: Infantry
- Garrison/HQ: Medicine Hat, Alberta
- Battle honours: The Great War, 1916–17

Commanders
- Officer commanding: LCol Nelson Spencer

The 175th Battalion, CEF, was a unit in the Canadian Expeditionary Force during the First World War.

== History ==
Based in Medicine Hat, Alberta, the unit began recruiting during the winter of 1915/16 in the Medicine Hat district. After sailing to England in October 1916, the battalion was absorbed into the 21st Reserve Battalion on January 10, 1917. The 175th Battalion, CEF, had one officer commanding: Lieutenant-Colonel Nelson Spencer.

== Battle honours ==
In 1929, the battalion was awarded the theatre of war honour The Great War, 1916–17.

== Perpetuation ==
Perpetuation of the 175th Battalion was assigned to The Alberta Regiment in 1920. When this regiment split in two in 1924, the South Alberta Regiment carried the perpetuation. The South Alberta Regiment merged into the South Alberta Light Horse (29th Armoured Regiment) in 1954, and this regiment (now simply the South Alberta Light Horse) carries on the perpetuation of the 175th Battalion. The 175th Battalion, along with the 3rd Regiment, Canadian Mounted Rifles, is commemorated by white hillside glyphs ("3CMR 175") in Medicine Hat.

== See also ==
- List of infantry battalions in the Canadian Expeditionary Force
