= King's Own Calgary Regiment =

The King's Own Calgary Regiment (RCAC)
- The King's Own Calgary Regiment (RCAC)
- Active: 1910–present
- Country: Canada
- Branch: Canadian Army
- Role: Armoured cavalry
- Size: Regiment
- Part of: 41 Canadian Brigade Group
- Garrison/HQ: Calgary, Alberta
- Nickname: The King's Own
- Motto: Onward
- Colours: Oxford and Cambridge blue
- March: "Colonel Bogey"
- Anniversaries: St. George's Day
- Engagements: First World War; Second World War; War in Afghanistan
- Battle honours: See #Battle honours
- Website: www.canada.ca/en/army/corporate/3-canadian-division/the-kings-own-calgary-regiment.html

Commanders
- Commanding officer: LCol John Fisher CD
- Regimental sergeant major: CWO Pablo Fernandez, CD
- Colonel-in-chief: Formerly Queen Elizabeth II
- Honorary Colonel: Hon Col Linda Southern-Heathcott
- Honorary Lieutenant Colonel: Hon LCol Ravinder Minhas
- Notable commanders: MGen Jay Milne
- Abbreviation: KO Calg R

The King's Own Calgary Regiment (RCAC) is a Royal Canadian Armoured Corps cavalry regiment of the Canadian Armed Forces. Headquartered at Mewata Armoury in Calgary, Alberta, the King's Own is a part-time Primary Reserve unit of 41 Canadian Brigade Group, 2nd Canadian Division. Its regimental museum is at The Military Museums (TMM) in Southwest Calgary.

The King's Own conducts tactical and technical training for armoured crewmen and officers, in preparation for expeditionary deployments overseas and in support of Canadians at home through domestic operations. These deployment are often in the form or individual or subunit deployments augmenting the Regular Force. King's Own crewmen and officers gain expertise on motorized warfare, to include direct attack, reconnaissance, defensive, delay and exploitation tasks, by combining knowledge on armoured warfare, and communication, driving and gunnery skills. Members of the regiment are trained on the Textron tactical armoured patrol vehicle (TAPV), the Mercedes Benz G-Wagen and Polaris UTV, as well as on support vehicles, such as the Medium Support Vehicle System (MSVS) and militarized Chevrolet Silverado (MILCOTS) and the Light Support Vehicle Wheeled (LSVW). Selected members have the opportunity to also be trained on the Leopard 2A4 main battle tank (MBT) and the LAV 6.

Besides reconnaissance crewman and officers, soldiers of the regiment are also trained as mechanics, CIMIC (civil-military co-operation) operators, musicians (in the regimental brass and reed band), resource management support clerks, and storesmen.

== Cap badge ==
On a shield Argent a cross Gules surmounted by a maple leaf in autumnal tints charged with a bison statant on a mound, on a chief the local landscape at sunset all proper, the shield ensigned by the Royal Crown, supported dexter by a horse, sinister by a steer, adorned beneath with a rose between shamrocks and thistles all proper, the whole set upon three scrolls Or, the upper one inscribed with the motto ONWARD and the two below inscribed KING'S OWN CALGARY REGIMENT in letters Azure.

The Crown represents service to the Sovereign. The badge, incorporates the shield, the horse, the steer and the roses, thistles, and shamrocks, as adopted by the City of Calgary in 1902. "KING'S OWN CALGARY REGIMENT" is a form of the regimental title and "ONWARD" is the motto of the regiment and the City of Calgary.

== Lineage ==
The King's Own Calgary Regiment (Royal Canadian Armoured Corps) was split off in 1920 from the 103rd Regiment (Calgary Rifles), which was originally raised on 10 April 1910 at Calgary, Alberta. The regiment was reorganized on 15 March 1920 as two separate regiments, The Alberta Regiment (now The South Alberta Light Horse) and The Calgary Regiment, as part of the Otter Committee reorganizations. On 15 May 1924, The Calgary Regiment was again reorganized and split into two separate regiments, The Calgary Regiment (now The King's Own Calgary Regiment) and The Calgary Highlanders (10th Canadians).

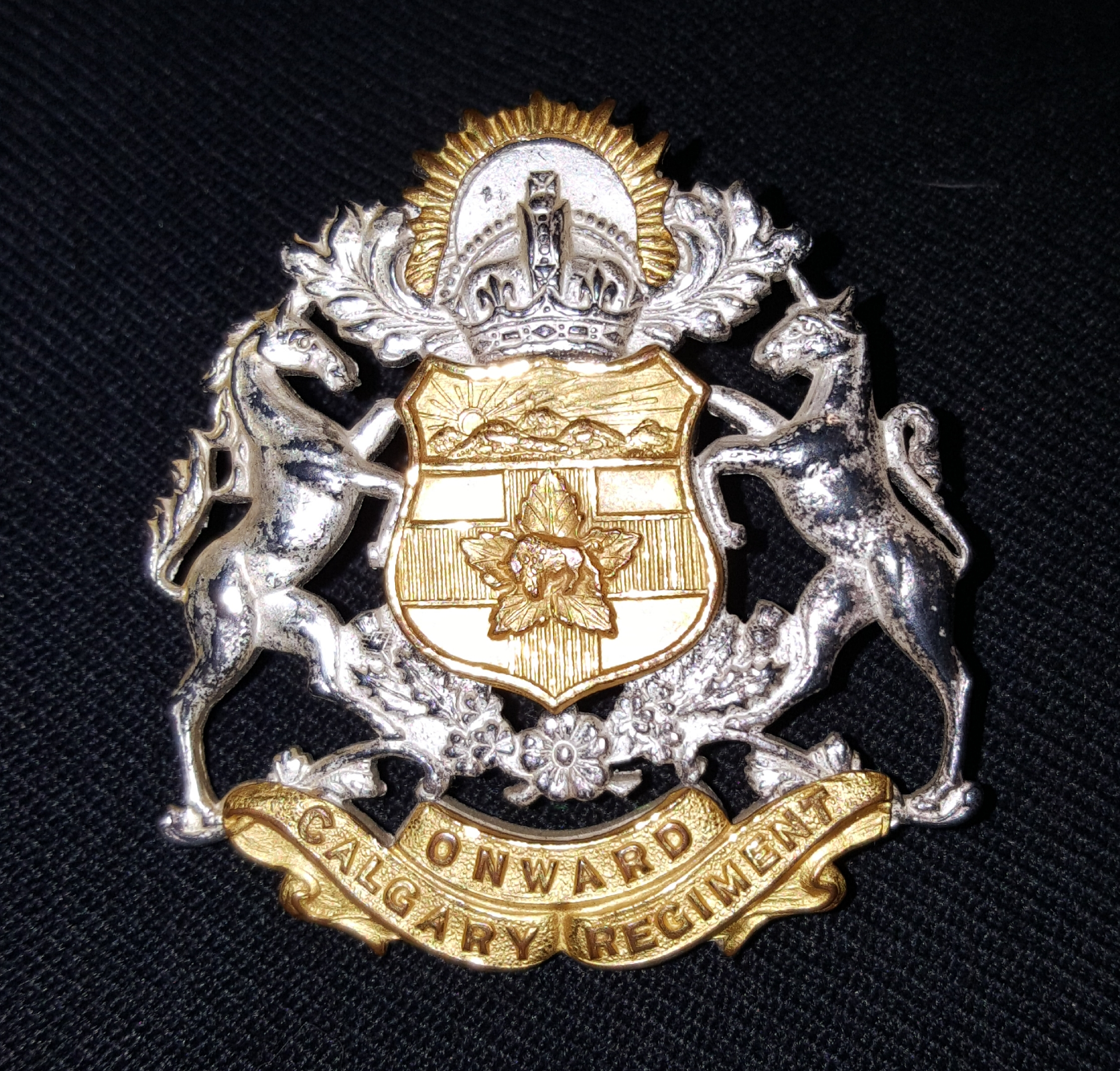
1920 to post WW2 officer's cap badge. Traditionally, officers wear silver and gilt cap badges, while NCMs wear brass and white metal.

On 15 September 1921, The Calgary Regiment was divided into six battalions. The 1st Battalion became the 1st Battalion, Calgary Highlanders, The Calgary Regiment. The 2nd Battalion, The Calgary Regiment later became the King's Own Calgary Regiment. The 3rd, 4th and 5th battalions were paper units that were never formed and disbanded in the 1936 reorganizations of the Militia.

On 15 May 1924, The Calgary Regiment reorganized as separate regiments.

=== The King's Own Calgary Regiment (RCAC) ===
- 1 April 1910: Organized as the 103rd Regiment "Calgary Rifles"
- 15 March 1920: Reorganized as two separate regiments, The Calgary Regiment and The Alberta Regiment (now The South Alberta Light Horse
- 15 May 1924: Reorganized as two separate regiments, The Calgary Regiment (now The King's Own Calgary Regiment) and The Calgary Highlanders
- 1 April 1936: Amalgamated with the 'Headquarters' and 'B Company' of the '13th Machine Gun Battalion, CMGC' retaining its designation.
- 15 December 1936: Redesignated The Calgary Regiment (Tank)
- 1 April 1941: Redesignated 14th (Reserve) Army Tank Battalion, (The Calgary Regiment (Tank))
- 15 August 1942: Redesignated 14th (Reserve) Army Tank Regiment, (The Calgary Regiment (Tank))
- 1 April 1946: Redesignated 14th Armoured Regiment (Calgary Regiment), RCAC
- 22 July 1946: Redesignated 14th Armoured Regiment (King's Own Calgary Regiment)
- 4 Feb 1949: Redesignated The King's Own Calgary Regiment (14th Armoured Regiment)
- 19 May 1958: Redesignated The King's Own Calgary Regiment (RCAC)

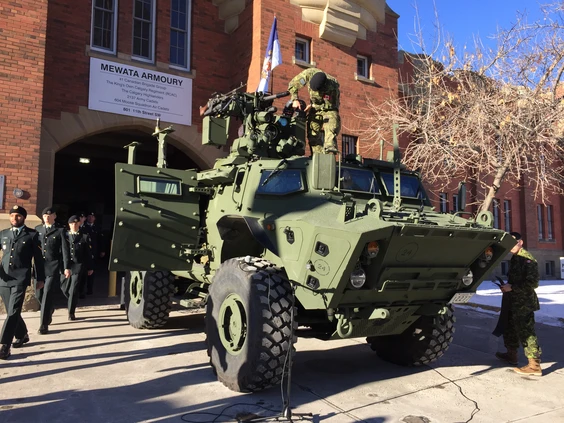
Textron tactical armoured patrol vehicle, used by KOCR, outside of Mewata Armouries.

=== 13th Machine Gun Battalion, CMGC ===
- Originated on 1 June 1919, in Edmonton, Alberta, as the 13th Machine Gun Brigade, CMGC
- Redesignated on 15 September 1924, as the 13th Machine Gun Battalion, CMGC
- Amalgamated on 1 April 1936, with The Calgary Regiment

=== Lineage chart ===
Lineage chart

1910	103rd Regt "Calgary Rifles"
1914	50th Bn, CEF
1915	89th "Overseas" Bn, CEF	137th "Overseas" Bn, CEF
1916	175th "Overseas" Bn, CEF
1917	Absorbed by 9th Reserve Bn	21st Reserve Bn, CEF
1919	13th MG Bde, CMGC
1920	Disbanded
1920	1st Bn (50th Bn, CEF), The Calgary Regt	2nd Bn (56th Bn, CEF), The Calgary Regt	4th Bn (137th Bn, CEF), (Note: Reserve) The Calgary Regt
1920	1st Bn (10th Bn, CEF), The Calgary Regt	2nd Bn (50th Bn, CEF), The Calgary Regt	5th Bn (137th Bn, CEF), The Calgary Regt
1921	1st Bn (10th Bn, CEF), Calgary Highlanders, The Calgary Regt
1924	The Calgary Highlanders	1st Bn (50th Bn, CEF), The Calgary Regt	2nd Bn (89th Bn, CEF), The Calgary Regt	3rd Bn (137th Bn, CEF), The Calgary Regt	13th MG Bn, CMGC
1936	Disbanded	Disbanded
1936	The Calgary Regt
1936	The Calgary Regt (Tank)
1941	14th Army Tank Bn (The Calgary Regt (Tank)), CAC, CASF	14th (Reserve) Army Tank Bn, (The Calgary Regt (Tank))
1942	14th Army Tank Regt (The Calgary Regt (Tank)), CAC, CASF	14th (Reserve) Army Tank Regt, (The Calgary Regt (Tank))
1943	14th Armd Regt (The Calgary Regt), CAC, CASF
1945	14th Armd Regt (The Calgary Regt), RCAC, CASF
1945	Disbanded
1946	14th Armd Regt (Calgary Regt), RCAC
1946	14th Armd Regt (King's Own Calgary Regt)
1949	The King's Own Calgary Regt (14th Armd Regt)
1958	The King's Own Calgary Regt (RCAC)

== History ==
Colonel Bogey March
"Colonel Bogey March" is the authorized march of The King's Own Calgary Regiment (RCAC) of the Canadian Forces. This version is performed by the United States Navy Band.

=== 1910–1913 ===
The King's Own Calgary Regiment began on 1 April 1910, when its predecessor the 103rd Regiment (Calgary Rifles), an infantry regiment of the Canadian non-permanent militia, was authorized and formed at Calgary, Alberta, Canada, by General Order 38/10. The first commanding officer was Lieutenant-Colonel William Charles Gordon Armstrong. The regiment was approved to train six companies of 50 men each, and later expanded to eight companies.

The unit initially paraded at the former Calgary General Hospital building (today known as the Rundle Ruins) before being ordered to vacate in September 1910. The unit then moved into the former drill hall of the Canadian Mounted Rifles on Centre Street and 12th Avenue SE. In 1911 a new armoury was found, in a former German-Canadian club a block south of their former home at the General Hospital. After Mewata Armouries was completed during the First World War, the regiment moved its offices to that location.

At the outbreak of the First World War the regiment was not mobilized but served as a recruiting depot to raise battalions for the Canadian Expeditionary Force. These soldiers were also employed full time as part of the Active Militia. A number of reinforcement battalions were commanded by former 103rd Regiment officers, including Lieutenant-Colonel William Charles Gordon Armstrong (56th Battalion (Calgary), CEF) and Lieutenant-Colonel George Morfitt (137th (Calgary) Battalion, CEF).

The regiment also supplied soldiers to man internment camps near Castle Mountain and the Cave and Basin in Rocky Mountains Park. Three soldiers of the 103rd Regiment (Calgary Rifles) died while assigned to the camp and are buried in Banff.

=== First World War ===
Details of the 103rd Regiment "Calgary Rifles" were placed on active service on 6 August 1914 for local protection duties. The 103rd contributed men to a number of battalions that became antecedents of The King's Own Calgary Regiments. The King's Own perpetuates the 50th, 89th and 137th Battalions CEF.

The 50th Battalion Canadian Expeditionary Force was authorized on 7 November 1914; authorization was published in General Order 86 on 1 July 1915. It was mobilized in Calgary in December 1914 under the command of LCol E.G. Mason, and trained at Sarcee Camp. The first draft of 5 officers and 251 other ranks was sent to England on 14 June 1915. 5 officers and 250 other ranks embarked 11 September 1915 and became replacements for the 10th Battalion. The battalion was brought back up to full strength of 41 officers and 1036 other ranks, and embarked for Britain on 27 October 1915 aboard RMS Orduna. The battalion disembarked in France on 11 August 1916, where it fought as part of the 10th Canadian Infantry Brigade, 4th Canadian Division in France and Flanders until the end of the war. The battalion suffered over 4000 casualties. During this period Pte J.G. Pattison won the Victoria Cross. The battalion returned to England 27 April 1919, disembarked at Halifax 5 June 1919 and demobilized at Calgary 9 June 1919. The 50th was disbanded by General Order 149 of 15 September 1920. This is the main battalion perpetuated by The King's Own. For further details consult The 50th in No Man's Land by Victor W. Wheelerdge, Pte. John George Pattison of the 50th Battalion CEF was awarded the Empire's highest award for gallantry, the Victoria Cross, for his heroic actions on 10 April 1917, storming a German machine-gun nest.

The 89th Battalion, which was authorized by General Order 151 on 22 December 1915 as the “89th Overseas Battalion CEF” It was organized in Calgary under the command of LCol W.W. Nasmyth and recruited from Alberta. The battalion embarked for Britain on 2 June 1916 aboard the RMS Olympic and disembarked on the 8 June 1916 with 23 officers and 969 other ranks. In June 1916, drafts were sent to: 167 men to the Machine Gun Depot; 168 to the 9th Reserve Battalion; and 65 to other units. In August 1916 drafts were sent to: 115 men to 7th Battalion; 150 men to 10th Battalion; and 150 to 31st Battalion. After some further small drafts, its personnel were absorbed by the 97th Battalion and the 9th Reserve Battalion 7 October 1916. The battalion was disbanded on 21 May 1917. The 89th Battalion was disbanded Privy Council Orders 1366 and 1863 of 21 May and 6 July 1917.

The 137th Overseas Battalion CEF was authorized by General Order 151 on 22 December 1915. It was organized in Calgary under the command of LCol G.W. Morfitt in November 1915. The battalion embarked for Britain from Halifax on 24 August 1916 on board RMS Olympic. It disembarked in England 29 Aug 1916 with 32 officers and 936 other ranks. On 28 November 1916 it sent drafts of 100 men to the 10th Battalion, and 150 men to the 31st Battalion. On 5 December it sent 100 men to the 49th Battalion. It was amalgamated with the 175th "Overseas" Battalion, CEF to form the 21st Reserve Battalion, CEF, on 10 January 1917, to provide reinforcements for the Canadian Corps in the field. The battalion was disbanded on 4 August 1917 by Privy Council Order 1895 of 17 July 1917. For further reading on the 137th Bn, read A Legacy of Courage “Calgary's Own” 137th Bn CEF by Fred Bagley and Dr. Harvey Duncan.

On 1 April 1936, the Calgary Regiment was amalgamated with the 'Headquarters' and 'B Company' of the '13th Machine Gun Battalion, CMGC retaining its designation.

It was re-designated: 'The Calgary Regiment (Tank)' on 15 December 1936.

=== 1920-1938 ===
On 15 March 1920 the 103rd Calgary Rifles was reorganized as two separate regiments, designated 'The Alberta Regiment' (now 'The South Alberta Light Horse') and 'The Calgary Regiment'. On 1 April 1920 the Calgary Regiment was reorganized as a five battalion regiment with the 1st Battalion (10th Battalion, CEF) and 2nd Battalion (50th Battalion, CEF) on the Non Permanent Active Militia order of battle and the 3rd Battalion (56th Battalion, CEF), 4th Battalion (82nd Battalion, CEF) and 5th Battalion (137th Battalion, CEF) on the Reserve order of battle (GO 95/21).

On 15 May 1924 the Calgary Regiment was again reorganized as two separate regiments, designated 'The Calgary Highlanders' and 'The Calgary Regiment' Upon further reorganization, the Calgary Regiment was organized as a three battalion regiment with the 1st Battalion (50th Battalion, CEF) on the Non Permanent Active Militia order of battle and the 2nd Battalion (89th Battalion, CEF) and 3 rd Battalion (137th Battalion, CEF) on the Reserve order of battle. The reserve units were disbanded on 14 December 1936 (GO 3/37).

=== World War II (1939–1942) ===
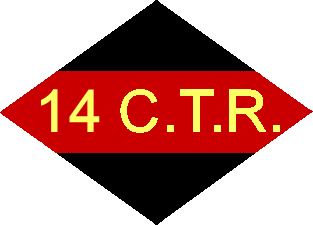
Unit patch of the 14th Army Tank Regiment during the Second World War

Details from the regiment were called out on service on 26 August 1939 and then placed on active service on 1 September 1939, under the designation 'The Calgary Regiment (Tank), CASF (Details)', for local protection duties. The details called out on active service were disbanded on 31 December 1940. The regiment subsequently mobilized an armour regiment designated the '14th Army Tank Battalion (The Calgary Regiment (Tank)), CAC, CASF' on 11 February 1941. This battalion was formed out of approximately 400 members of the NPAM battalion and approximately 100 members of the Seaforth Highlanders of Canada and the Edmonton Regiment. It was re-designated: '14th Army Tank Regiment (The Calgary Regiment (Tank)), CAC, CASF' on 15 May 1942; '14th Armoured Regiment (The Calgary Regiment), CAC, CASF' on 26 August 1943.

The CASF unit embarked for Britain on 20 June 1941. The regiment took part in the raid on Dieppe on 19 August 1942 as the first unit of the Canadian Armoured Corps to go into action. The regiment landed at Dieppe in support of the Essex Scottish Regiment (from southwestern Ontario) and the Royal Hamilton Light Infantry (from Hamilton, Ontario) whose task it was to assault the main beach.

The following is an excerpt from the regimental War Diary. On the main beach at Dieppe, the broad plan of events was as follows:

Despite the heavy bombardment from the sea by naval forces and from the air by Hurricane Bombers, the enemy's concealed positions in front of the town itself were not destroyed, and they were still able to bring most intense fire to bear on any point on the main beach, the moment it was assaulted. The first wave of tanks of this Regiment got ashore successfully and some of them assaulted the town. Others, however, were not successful in negotiating the sea wall and did not get off the beach and a number of them soon were immobilized. Nevertheless their crews continued to fight their guns engaging enemy positions with good effect. Roads leading into the town were very solidly blocked and in order that the tanks might successfully penetrate into the town it was essential that these be removed. The engineers were carrying large quantities of selected explosives for this purpose. Unfortunately, however, the heavy fire which the enemy was still able to bring to bear on the beach caused heavy casualties amongst the sappers. Despite great courage and determination they were unable to clear the road blocks. This made it extremely difficult for the tanks to get into the town at all. Consequently the majority of the tanks fought during the whole of the engagement, up and down the beach and promenade. The Landing Craft (Tank) carrying Regimental Headquarters went into the beach in the 3rd wave under cover of smoke. The leading tank, commanded by Capt. A.G. Stanton, Adjutant, got off at once but bogged down in the loose shale of the beach and blocked the remaining tanks from getting off. Capt. Stanton's tank later managed to advance and fought hard for several hours until the crew were forced to abandon it when the tank caught fire. This Landing Craft (Tank), because of the blocking, withdrew and lay off shore for about an hour and a half. About this time the Colonel ordered Major A. Glenn, O.C. "C" Sqn to take command of all the tanks then on shore. The Landing Craft (Tank) then went in again this time without the aid of a smoke screen. As it approached the shore with its door partly lowered, the chains supporting the door were blown away and the door dropped under the Landing Craft (Tank) and prevented it from getting any closer to the shore.

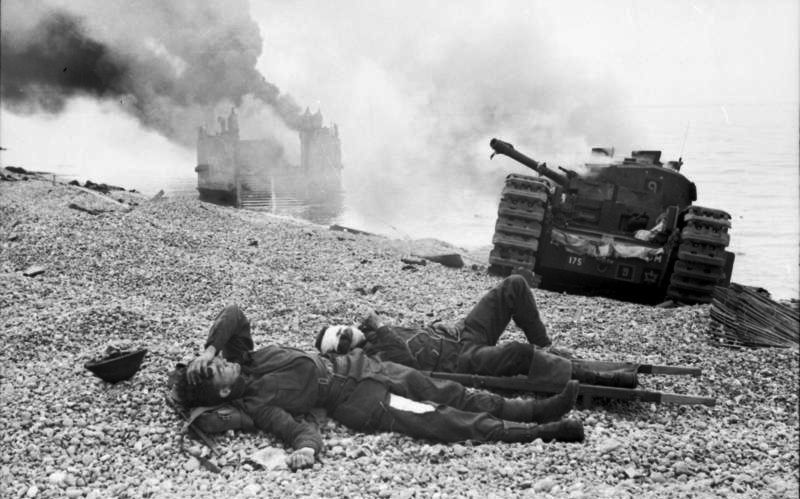
Churchill tanks of 14 CTR (The Calgary Regiment) at Dieppe.

The colonel's tank at once drove off the ship, tearing a louvre extension and sank into six feet of water and stalled. The crew abandoned the tank and the Colonel was seen to get into an R boat. However, almost immediately this boat was set ablaze and the Colonel was last seen swimming in the water. (His body was never recovered) Capt. B.G. Purdy who was commanding No. 8 Troop of "B" Squadron, specially equipped with flame throwers, attempted to land as planned on the right of the main beach. However for some unknown reason, his tank went off in very deep water and had to be abandoned immediately. Capt. Purdy was assisted in the water by his operator, Tpr. Aide and it is believed both were wounded. Tpr. Aide had finally to let go and Capt. Purdy was last seen being carried away by the current. (Tpr Aide was one of the two who managed to return) All tanks which got ashore fought very hard until either out of action or out of ammunition. At about 1225 hours, Major Glenn ordered all personnel to the beach and to be ready to abandon the tanks when the boats came in. At this time, as throughout the whole operation, the voices on the air were calm and unhurried. The fire on the beach at this time had grown very fierce and casualties of the withdrawing troops were heavy. Only two members of the total tank crews on shore managed to get away and the remainder were either killed or taken prisoner. Of the men of the regiment that went ashore 13 were killed, including Lieutenant Colonel J. G. Andrews (the Commanding Officer), and Captain D. G. Purdy, 4 were wounded, 157 taken prisoner.

=== Italian Campaign (1942–1944) ===
In the spring of 1943, Lieutenant-Colonel C.H. Neroutsos took command of the regiment. The new unit went to Sicily in 1943 with the 1st Canadian Army Tank Brigade, re-equipped with the Sherman tank.

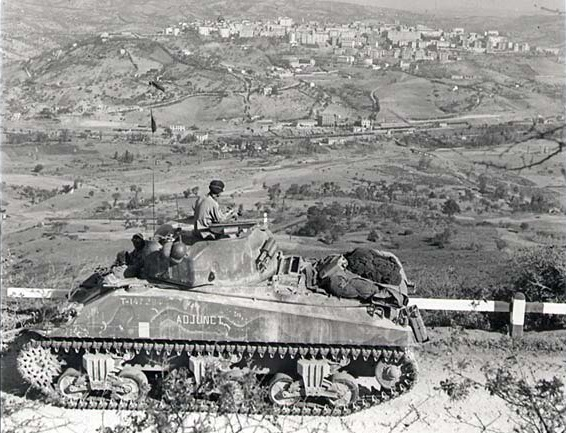
Sherman tank Adjunct of "A" Squadron, 14th Armoured Regiment (The Calgary Regiment), firing on Potenza in support of the advance of the West Nova Scotia Regiment.

On 3 September 1943, the regiment assaulted the beaches of Reggio Calabria to little resistance and moved northwards with notable engagements in Potenza, Motta Montecorvino and Campobasso while supporting the 1st Canadian Infantry Division. On 21 November 1943, the regiment supported the 8th Indian Infantry Division in its assault against fierce German opposition on the Sangro River. In December the regiment met stubborn opposition fighting for the Moro River and later Vino Ridge and the Ortona Crossroads.

On 11–12 May 1944 the regiment assaulted across the Gari River supporting the 19th Indian Brigade of the 8th Indian Division. During this operation and the advance towards the Hitler Line the regiment sustained casualties numbering 16 officers, 40 other ranks, and 60 tank casualties. An innovative use of a modified Sherman tank to carry a bridge across the Gari River is known as Kingsmill bridge after its inventor, Captain T. Kingsmill. Kingsmill was to receive the Military Cross for the action. At this point Lieutenant-Colonel Neroutsos fell ill, and the regiment was taken over by Lieutenant-Colonel C.A. Richardson.

In June 1944 the Calgaries took part in the Battle of Lake Trasimeno in support of the British 4th Division, after which the Calgaries conducted a pursuit up the Chiani Valley until the Lydia Line was reached south of Arezzo. By 3 August 1944, the regiment had advanced with the 8th Indian Division to the Arno River through country with remarkably poor tank going.

On 25 August 1944 the Calgaries made an assault crossing of the Arno River, east of Florence pushing into the Sieve Valley where the Gothic Line was assaulted in the "Marradi" sector in support of the 1/5 Gurkha Regiment. Another miserably wet Italian winter was spent in the mountains.

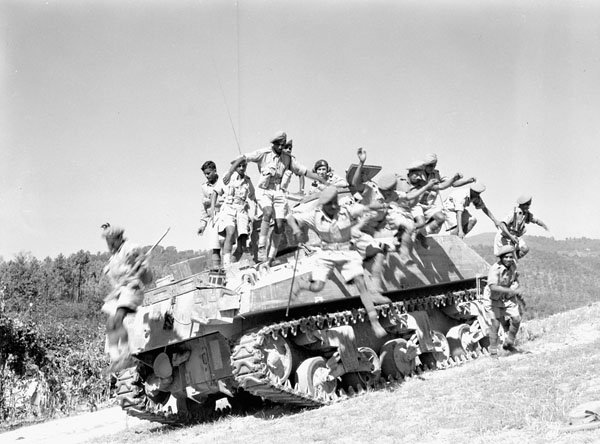
Infantry of the 1/5 Mahratta Light Infantry jumping from a Sherman tank of the Calgary Regiment during a tank-infantry training course, Florence, Italy, 28 August 1944.

=== Liberation of the Netherlands(1945) ===
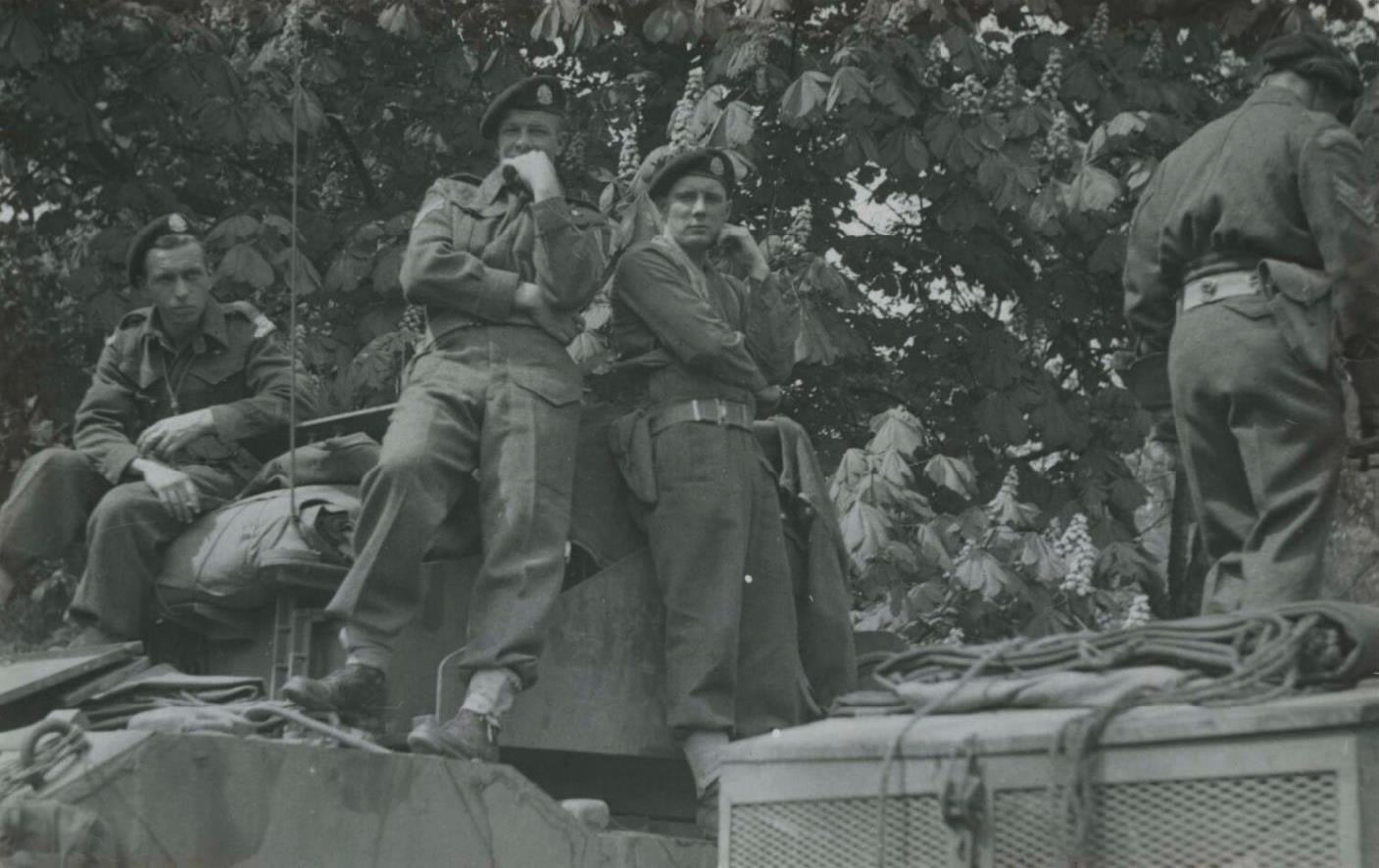
Reconnaissance Squadron, the Calgary Regiment, Netherlands, 1945

In late February 1945 the regiment was moved to Leghorn and embarked to Marseille, France, where it moved by rail to the North-West Europe theatre. The regiment moved to the Reichswald Forest and on 12 April 1945 fought in the Second Battle of Arnhem, supporting the 49th (West Riding) Infantry Division to Ede, Netherlands. The regiment's final actions of the Second World War were in support of the 1st Belgium Brigade in clearing the resistance between the Nederrijn and Waal rivers.

When the overseas unit returned to Canada in 1945, it was disbanded, and the Calgary Regiment continued its service as a reserve armoured unit.

=== Reserve regiment ===
The reserve regiment remained in Calgary under LCol Kingsley (King) Jull MC and was designated '14th (Reserve) Army Tank Battalion, (The Calgary Regiment (Tank))' on 1 April 1941; and then '14th (Reserve) Army Tank Regiment, (The Calgary Regiment (Tank))' on 15 August 1942. It consisted of HQ Squadron in Calgary, A Squadron in Red Deer, B Squadron in Stettler, and C Squadron in Olds. Once the Active regiment was mobilized, Red Deer could no longer support a squadron. Olds and Red Deer became A Squadron, Stettler became B Squadron, and C Squadron was formed from detachments in Coronation, Consort, Veteran, and Alliance. C Squadron Headquarters was in Alliance. It recruited members for the 1st Battalion CASF Regiment, and drafts to other regiments such as the initial establishment of the South Alberta Regiment. The Reserve regiment also trained 77 officers and over 1500 men who joined other branches of the military for service overseas.

=== 1945–1970 ===
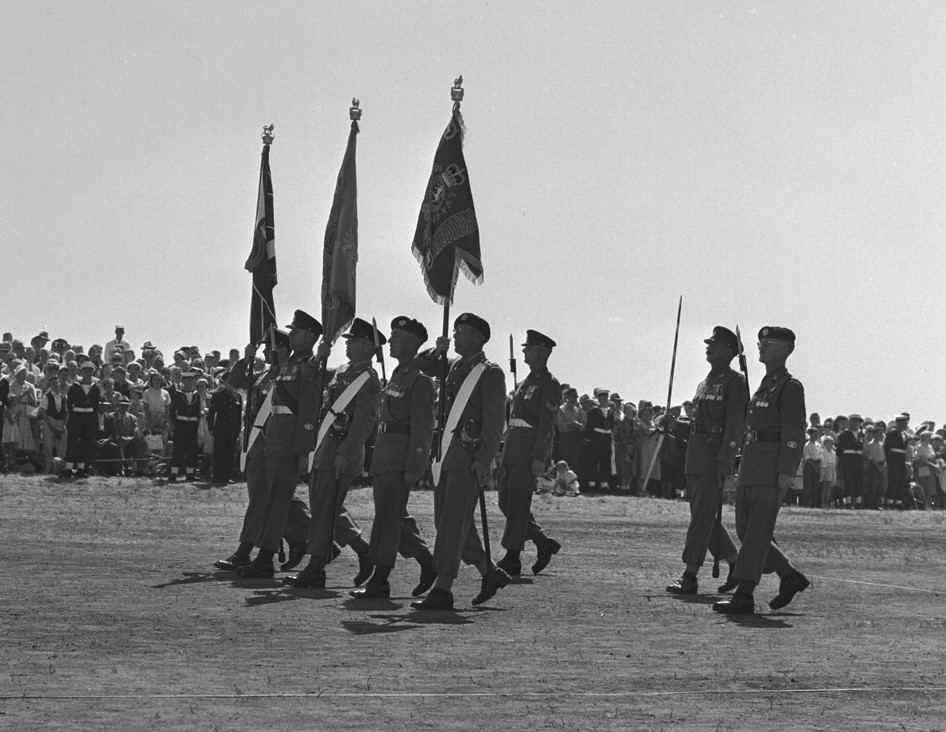
Presentation of the regimental guidon to the KOCR and regimental colours to 1PPCLI, Beacon Hill Park in Victoria, BC, by the colonel-in-chief, Queen Elizabeth II, on 17 July 1959

The Calgary Regiment's Second World War record was outstanding. To recognize the contribution the regiment made, King George VI granted the prefix “King's Own” to the regiment's name. Therefore, the regiment was re-designated the '14th Armoured Regiment (King's Own Calgary Regiment)' on 22 July 1946; 'The King's Own Calgary Regiment (14th Armoured Regiment)' on 4 February 1949; and lastly, 'The King's Own Calgary Regiment (RCAC)' on 19 May 1958.

Over this period the regiment changed in its structure numerous times including absorbing members of the South Alberta Light Horse (formerly 15 Alberta Light Horse) when it was relocated to Medicine Hat. Part II Orders of June 1963 list the regiment as RHQ, “B” Squadron and Band in Calgary; “A” Squadron in Strathmore and Gleichen; and “C’ Squadron in Red Deer, Innisfail and Olds. Strength of the unit at in 1963 was 31 Officers and 352 men. Starting in 1965, the outlying squadrons and troops in Red Deer, Olds, Stettler, Gleichen, Lacombe, Consort, Innisfail, Strathmore, Coronation, Veteran and Alliance were reduced. In 1964 the regiment maintained a fleet of 14 M4A2 Sherman tanks and 6 other “B” Vehicles. The regiment also absorbed members of 91 Battery, 19 Medium Regiment, Royal Canadian Artillery, when it was disbanded in 1965. By 1969 the regiment was concentrated at Calgary with HQ and two squadrons at Mewata Armoury and some facilities at CFB Calgary.

The regiment carried on as armoured with Sherman and Stuart (Honey) tanks until they were withdrawn between 1964-1969. At that time the regiment reverted to reconnaissance with 1967 pattern jeeps.

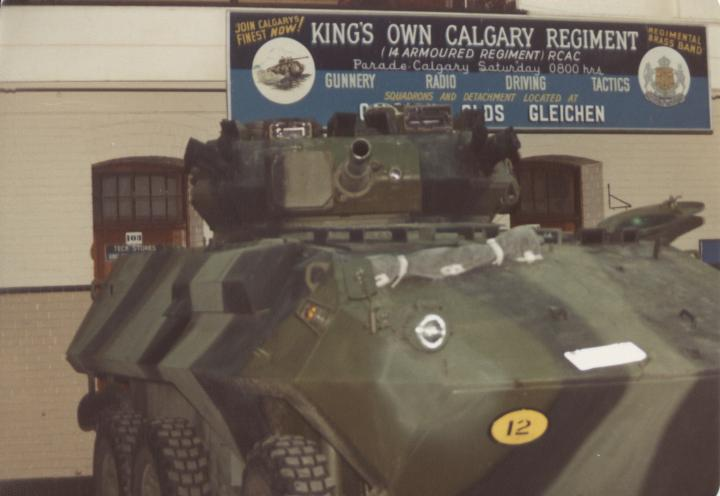
KOCR unit lines with Cougar c1980

=== Into the new millennium 1970-2013 ===
In the mid-1970s, as well as 1967 & 1974 Pattern jeeps, The King's Own had at one time a seven car troop of Ferret Scout Cars on loan from Lord Strathcona's Horse (RC). It had a solid platform other than jeeps and gave the regiment a sense of belonging to the Armoured Corps.

With the introduction of AVGP Cougar in 1978, The King's Own again had an armoured role. The unit had four Cougar's in Calgary for local training as well as maintaining its fleet of jeeps in a reconnaissance role. The 1967 & 1974 Pattern jeeps were replaced by the Iltis in 1987.

The Cougar was withdrawn from service in 2006 and the regiment reverted to reconnaissance. The Iltis was replaced by the Gielenwagon in 2007 and is the current platform. The regiment maintains a fleet 18 of 16 G-Wagons and support vehicles. In 2018 the regiment was allocated 4 Tactical Armoured Patrol Vehicles (TAPV) in addition to the G-Wagon fleet. 2 of the TAPV are Remote Weapon System (RWS) vehicles mounting a C-19 Grenade Launcher and a C6 Machine Gun. At the 2018 Soldiers Christmas Dinner, “Calgary” the first TAPV named by the regiment, was unveiled by the Mayor of Calgary, Naheed Nenshi.

Members of the regiment continued the military tradition of the unit by volunteering for United Nations and NATO missions augmenting Canadian Armed Forces regular units on peacekeeping duties in Cyprus, Croatia, Bosnia, Congo, Golan Heights, and Darfur.

=== 2013–present ===
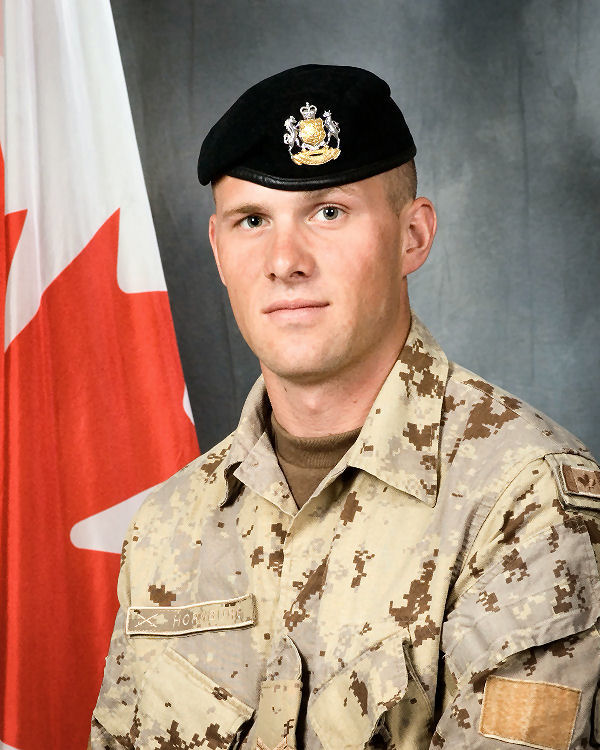
Corporal Nathan Hornburg, MID

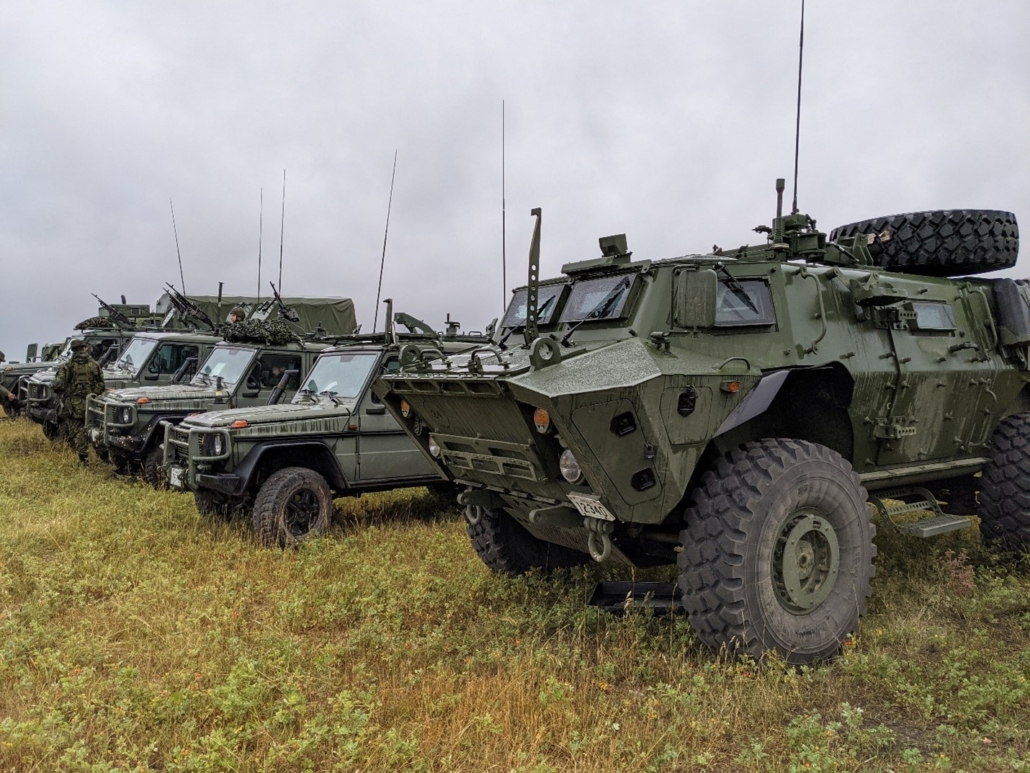
TAPV and G-Wagens of the regiment, Exercise Western Sabre 2021.

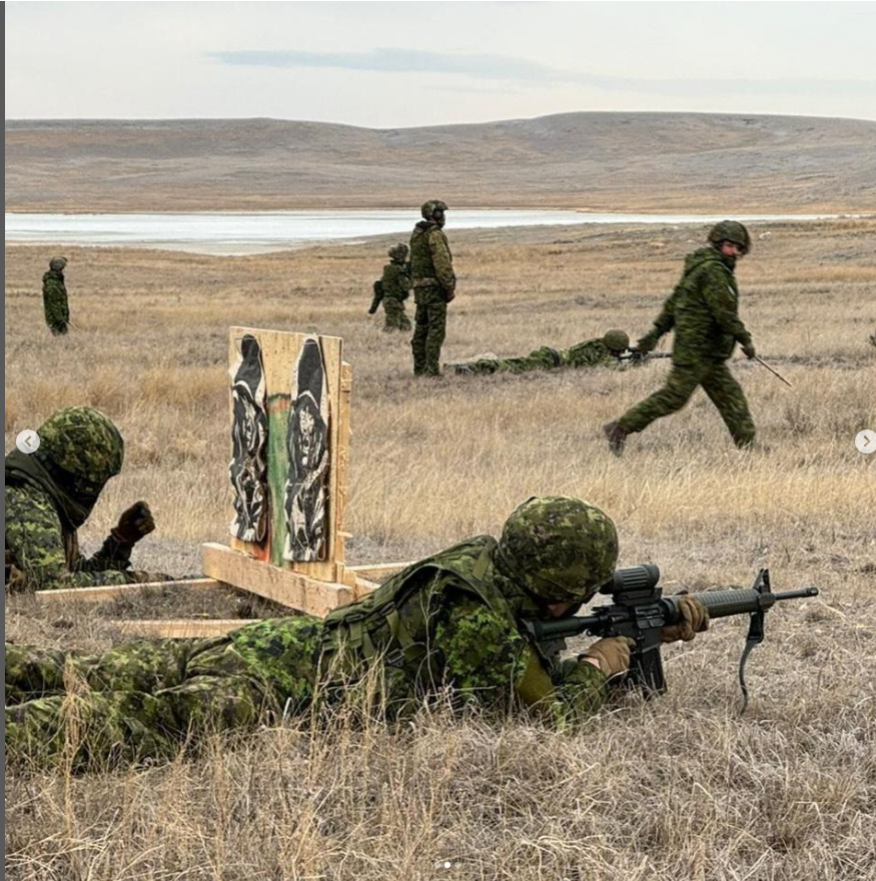
Members of the King's Own and South Alberta Light Horse from Lethbridge and Medicine Hat, practice live-fire section attacks as part of assault troop training during Exercise King's Pronghorn, November 2023

In addition to many soldiers having served on United Nations tours in Cyprus, Croatia, Bosnia, Congo, Golan Heights, and Darfur, members of the regiment volunteered on operational tours in Afghanistan.

Canada's participation in the War in Afghanistan saw many soldiers from the regiment deploy in a variety of roles throughout the conflict. On 24 September 2007, the King's Own suffered its first combat fatality since the Second World War, when Corporal Nathan Hornburg was killed in action while serving in Kandahar province. Hornburg was posthumously mentioned in dispatches for his exemplary performance in combat and on Sep 24, 2025 two bridges on a major ring road in northwest Calgary were named in Hornburg's honour. Signs honouring Hornburg are placed near the West Bow Bridges on Calgary's Stoney Trail.

As a result of The King’s Own contribution to the War in Afghanistan, the regiment was awarded the Afghanistan battle honour in 2014, which the unit proudly displays on their guidon.

Since 2014, the unit has been increasingly training with civilian side-by-side all-terrain platforms, snowmobiles, and all-terrain vehicles, confirming their utility during domestic operations and to supplement troop lift for various tasks. On 22 April 2018 the regiment unveiled the Textron Tactical Armoured Patrol Vehicle (TAPV) during the unit anniversary St. George's Day.

Internationally, the regiment continues to support current Canadian Forces operations wherever they occur including Latvia and the Middle East. The King’s Own also supports Canadian Armed Forces responses to domestic emergencies and contributed to the 2025 G7 summit in Kananaskis Country.

=== Cavalry ===
The RCAC's 2020 directive to have all armoured reconnaissance units move to a cavalry role, has resulted in a new training and fighting philosophy that sees King's Own soldiers being effective in the full scope of mechanized warfare – including conducting reconnaissance, deliberate defensive, and fast and aggressive offensive operations, in everything from UTVs to G-Wagens, and from TAPVs to MBTs.

With the cavalry shift also came the new battle task for the unit, in the form of the resurrection of the assault troop capability.

== Alliances ==
- United Kingdom—The Duke of Lancaster's Regiment (King's, Lancashire and Border)

== Battle honours ==
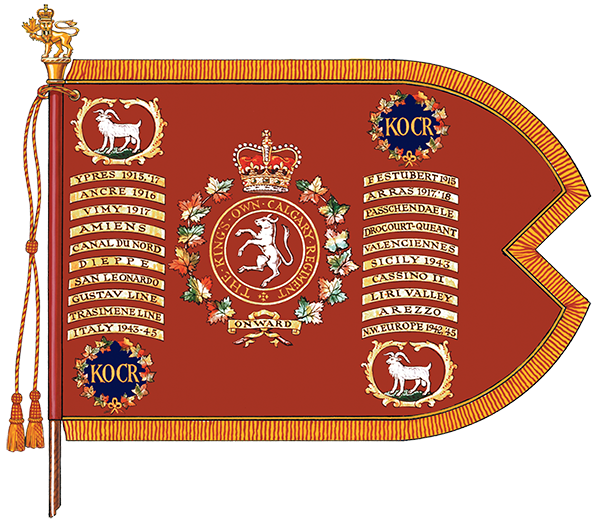
The guidon

In the list below, battle honours in capitals were awarded for participation in large operations and campaigns, while those in lowercase indicate honours granted for more specific battles. The battle honours written in bold are emblazoned on the regimental guidon.

=== First World War ===
1915 1916 1917 1918
- **Ypres, 1915** 22 April–25 May 1915
- **Festubert, 1915** 15–25 May 1915
- Mount Sorrel 2–13 June 1916
- Somme, 1916 1 July–18 November 1916
- Ancre Heights 1 October–11 November 1916
- **Ancre, 1916** 13–18 November 1916
- **Arras, 1917** 9 April–4 May 1917
- **Vimy, 1917** 9–14 April 1917
- Hill 70 15–25 August 1917
- **Ypres, 1917** 31 July–10 November 1917
- **Passchendaele** 12 October 1917 and/or 26 October–10 November 1917
- **Amiens** 8–11 August 1918
- **Arras, 1918** 26 August–3 September 1918
- Scarpe, 1918 26–30 August 1918
- **Drocourt–Quéant** 2–3 September 1918
- Hindenburg Line 12 September–9 October 1918
- **Canal du Nord** 27 September–2 October 1918
- **Valenciennes** 1–2 November 1918
- France and Flanders, 1915–18

=== Second World War ===
1943 1944
- **Dieppe** 19 August 1942
- **North-West Europe, 1942**
- **Sicily, 1943** 9 July 1943–17 August 1943
- Motta Montecorvino 1–3 October 1943
- **San Leonardo** 8–9 December 1943
- The Gully 10–19 December 1943
- **Cassino II** 11–18 May 1944
- **Gustav Line** 11–18 May 1944
- Pignataro 14–15 May 1944
- **Liri Valley** 18–30 May 1944
- Aquino 18–24 May 1944
- **Trasimene Line** 20–30 June 1944
- **Arezzo** 4–17 July 1944
- Advance to Florence
- Cerrone 25–31 August 1944
- **Italy, 1943–1945** 3 September 1943–22 April 1945
- **North-West Europe, 1945**

=== Southwest Asia ===
- **Afghanistan**

== Victoria Crosses ==
- Private John George Pattison, VC Born Sept. 8, 1875 in Woolwich, England, John George Pattison emigrated to Canada in 1906 with his wife, Sophia Louise Pattison, and their four children. They moved to Calgary where Pattison found work with the Calgary Gas Company. He enlisted with the 137th Battalion on March 6, 1916 at the age of 40 in a move to look after son Henry. When the 137th was broken up he was transferred to the 50th Bn. At 5 ft. 3 inch, Pattison was not an imposing figure but he proved himself, however, to be one of the battalion's most-courageous members, quite willing to put himself in harm's way to protect his comrades. Pattison's citation reads, 10 April 1917: “For most conspicuous bravery in the attack. When the advance of our troops was held up by an enemy machine gun, which was inflicting severe casualties, Pte. Pattison, with utter disregard of his own safety, sprang forward and, jumping from shell-hole to shell-hole, reached cover within 30 yards of the enemy gun. From this point, in face of heavy fire, he hurled bombs, killing and wounding some of the crew, then rushed forward, overcoming and bayonetting the surviving five gunners. His valour and initiative undoubtedly saved the situation and made possible the further advance to the objective.”
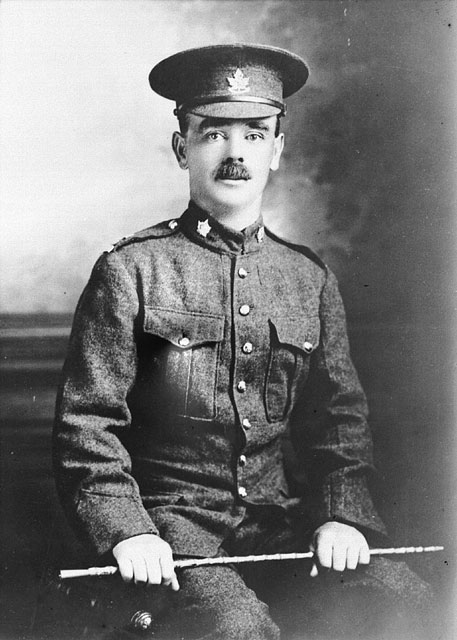
  Private John George Pattison, VC

== Regimental association ==
The regimental association of The King's Own Calgary Regiment is named The King's Own Calgary Regiment (50 CEF / 14 CTR) Association. The current association pulls roots from the 50/14 Veterans Association which was created by Second World War veterans upon their return home.

According to the association bylaws:

Anyone who at any time has served with The King's Own Calgary Regiment, or any of its predecessor units (including those who have served with the regiment on attachment), or who is related to a current or former serving member of the regiment or any of its predecessor units, or who has served with a cadet corps supported by the regiment, or who is a loyal supporter of The King's Own Calgary Regiment, shall be eligible for membership in the Association.

The name of the association reflects the perpetuation of both the 50th Battalion, CEF, and the 14th Armoured Regiment (The Calgary Regiment).

== Monuments ==
Soldiers of the 50th Battalion who went missing in action are memorialized on the Menin Gate and the Vimy Memorial while all Calgary-area soldiers of the regiment who have been killed in the First World War, Second World War and Afghanistan will be listed on the Calgary Soldiers' Memorial.

== Regimental band ==
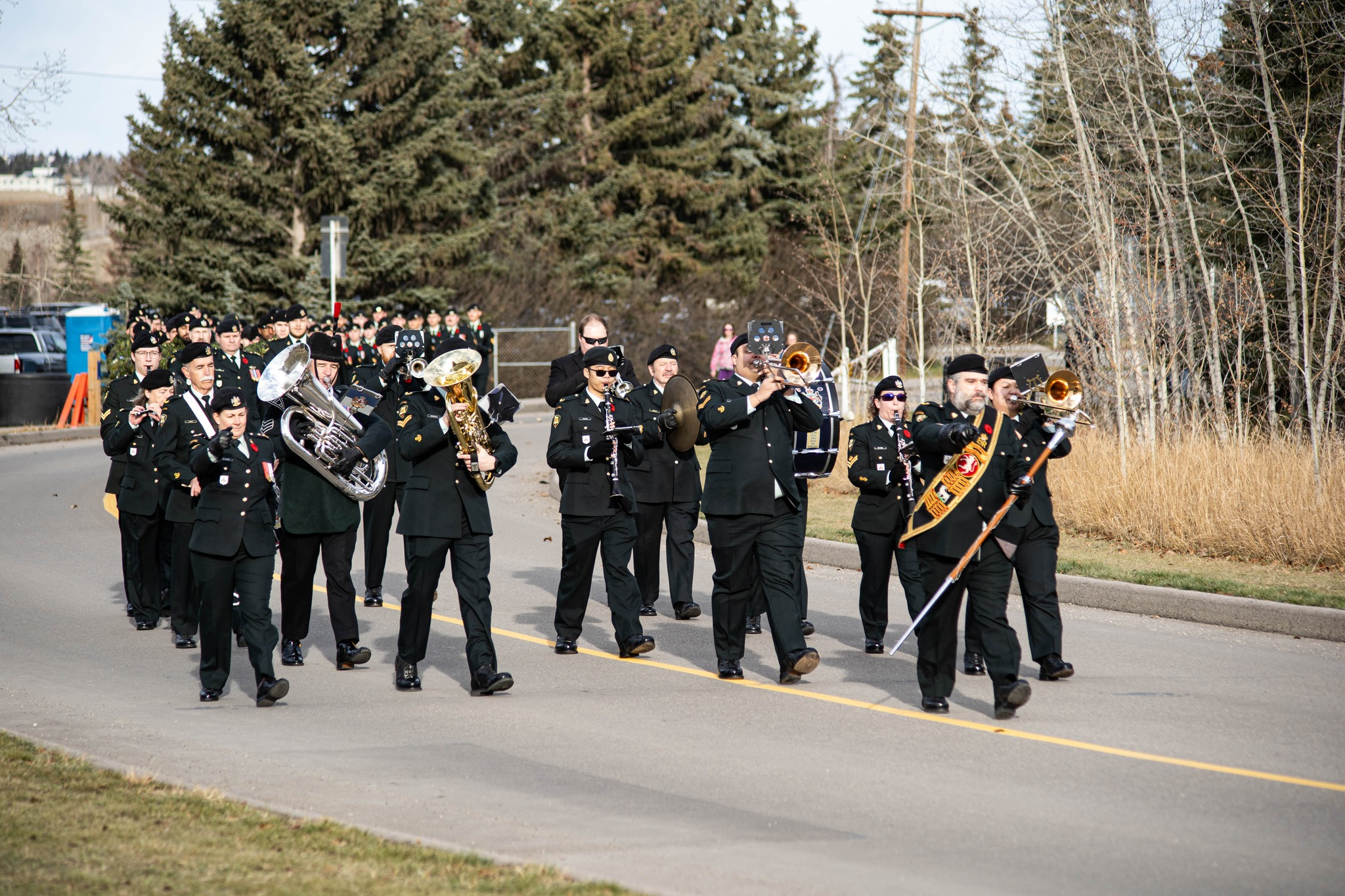
The King's Own Calgary Regiment Band, Remembrance Day at the 137 Battalion CEF Memorial in North Glenmore Park, Calgary, 11 Nov 2023

The regimental brass and reed band is an active reserve force band composed of serving soldiers and volunteers. The King's Own Calgary Regiment Band is one of the two Primary Army Reserve bands in 41 Canadian Brigade Group and services the Southern Alberta area. Musicians are generally from Calgary and Lethbridge. The band appears primarily as a concert and parade band which provides high caliber music for military, veterans and state functions as well as public performances throughout the year and as such is considered the de facto reserve military band for the Southern Alberta area. Established in 1910, it has taken part in many provincial events such as the Calgary Stampede and the regiment's St. George's Day parade. The band has the following ensembles:

- Wind Ensemble
- Brass Ensemble
  - Fanfare Team
- Percussion Ensemble
- Jazz ensemble

These ensembles make up the 35-member band, which primarily performs as a concert and parade band in the community. It also performs at military and provincial functions. Some band members have also contributed to the Ceremonial Guard in Ottawa.

== Cadets ==
The King's Own Calgary Regiment affiliated cadet corps is based in Cochrane, Alberta, bearing the title 2512 King's Own Calgary Regiment Cadet Corps. The corps was formed 26 April 1954 as King's Own Calgary Regiment (14th Armoured Regiment). The corps disbanded 1 January 1958. The corps was formed again on 1 November 1976 as the King's Own Calgary Regiment Cadet Corps, and continues to parade weekly during the training year.

Starting in 2020 a new cadet corps, in the form of 1910 Pte Pattison, VC, RCACC, was formed and affiliated with The King's Own. This cadet corps serves southeast Calgary and parades weekly out of Shepard. Notable members of the corps. Commanding officer of 1910 is Lt Ogilvie, Regimental Sergeant Major is Chief Warrant Officer Nicolaisen, A Squadron Sergeant Major is Master Warrant Officer Yee, B Squadron Sergeant Major is Master Warrant Officer Cooper.

== Notable members ==
- Clarence Gerhart
- Lance Corporal Henry Norwest

== Notes ==
Preceded by The Saskatchewan Dragoons	The King's Own Calgary Regiment (RCAC)	Succeeded by The British Columbia Dragoons
