= 51st Battalion (Edmonton), CEF =

51st Battalion, CEF
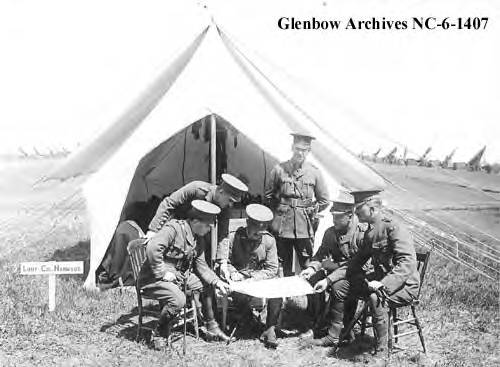
- Lt-Col Harwood and staff of the battalion
- Active: 1914–1917
- Disbanded: 1920
- Country: Canada
- Branch: Canadian Expeditionary Force
- Type: Infantry
- Mobilization headquarters: Edmonton
- Battle honours: The Great War, 1916–17

The 51st Battalion (Edmonton), CEF, was an infantry battalion of the Canadian Expeditionary Force during the Great War. The 51st Battalion was authorized on 7 November 1914 and embarked for Great Britain on 18 April 1916 on the Missanabie. It provided reinforcements for the Canadian Corps in the field until 13 November 1916, when it was reorganized as a garrison duty battalion. On 22 June 1917, its personnel were absorbed by the various regimental depots. The battalion was disbanded on 15 September 1920.

The battalion recruited in and was mobilized at Edmonton, Alberta.

While training at Sarcee Camp near Calgary, Alberta, the men of the battalion, along with many other units who trained at the camp, created hillside numerals of whitewashed stones overlooking their encampment. These stones, a 24-metre-high (79 ft) number "51", are the remainder of only four units whose glyphs survive on the hillside at Battalion Park in the neighbourhood of Signal Hill, Calgary.

The battalion had three officers commanding:

- Lt-Col Reginald de Lotbiniere Harwood, 19 April 1916 – 10 July 1916
- Maj. W.J. Shortreed, 10 July 1916 – 20 September 1916
- Lt.-Col. W.T. Stewart, 20 September 1916-

The battalion was awarded the battle honour The Great War, 1916–17.

A former member of the 51st, George Burdon McKean, was awarded the Victoria Cross while serving with the 14th Battalion at the front.

The perpetuation of the 51st Battalion, CEF, was assigned in 1920 to the 3rd Battalion, The Edmonton Regiment. When that regiment was split in 1924, the perpetuation went to the 2nd Battalion, The Edmonton Regiment. This regiment, now The Loyal Edmonton Regiment (4th Battalion, Princess Patricia's Canadian Light Infantry), continues to perpetuate the 51st Battalion today.

== Sources ==
- Canadian Expeditionary Force 1914-1919 by Col. G.W.L. Nicholson, CD, Queen's Printer, Ottawa, Ontario, 1962
