= 187th (Central Alberta) Battalion, CEF =

187th "Overseas" Battalion, CEF
- Active: 1916–1917
- Country: Canada
- Branch: Canadian Expeditionary Force
- Type: Infantry
- Battle honours: The Great War, 1916–17

Commanders
- Officer commanding: LCol Charles Wilson Robinson

The 187th (Central Alberta) Battalion, CEF, was a unit in the Canadian Expeditionary Force during the First World War. Based in Red Deer, Alberta, the unit began recruiting during the winter of 1915/16 in that city and the surrounding district. After sailing to England in December 1916, the battalion was absorbed into the 21st Reserve Battalion on February 20, 1917. The 187th (Central Alberta) Battalion, CEF, had one officer commanding: Lieutenant-Colonel Charles Wilson Robinson, of Munson, Alberta.

Perpetuation of the 187th Battalion was assigned to the Alberta Regiment in 1920. When this regiment split in two in 1924, the South Alberta Regiment carried the perpetuation. The South Alberta Regiment merged into the South Alberta Light Horse (29th Armoured Regiment) in 1954, and this regiment (now simply the South Alberta Light Horse) carries on the perpetuation of the 187th Battalion.

In 1929, the battalion was awarded the theatre of war honour The Great War, 1916–17.

The king's and regimental colours of the battalion are laid up in St Mark's Anglican Church in Innisfail, Alberta.
