= William Charles Gordon Armstrong =

Pioneer of Calgary, Alberta (1865–1951)

- Born: 2 November 1865; Sleaford, Lincolnshire, United Kingdom
- Died: 6 February 1951 (aged 85); Calgary, Alberta, Canada
- Burial place: Calgary, Alberta, Canada
- Military career
- Allegiance: Canada
- Branch: Canadian Army
- Service years: 1905-1920
- Rank: Lieutenant-Colonel
- Unit: 103rd Regiment (Calgary Rifles)
- Commands: 56th Battalion (Calgary), CEF

William Charles Gordon Armstrong was one of the "best known pioneers" in the early history of Calgary, Alberta, Canada. Armstrong was a successful and influential real estate magnate, municipal politician, and military officer. He is chiefly remembered for organizing Calgary's first military unit, the Canadian Mounted Rifles, as well as organizing and commanding Calgary's first official infantry unit, the 103rd Regiment (Calgary Rifles).

== Early life ==
Armstrong apprenticed as a tea-tester before coming to Canada in 1892 for health reasons. Armstrong settled in Calgary and worked as a surveyor and in real estate. Armstrong had a wife, Evelyn Eddy, and a son William Frances Armstrong. Among the other real estate deals he made, he built the Armstrong Block, one of Calgary's earliest commercial buildings, which was later demolished to make way for the Glenbow Museum.

== City Alderman ==
Armstrong served on city council from 1902 to 1904. As a member of city council he helped create Calgary's early street numbering system and electrical lighting grid.

== Military ==
Armstrong joined the Canadian Mounted Rifles in 1903, in particular organizing "G" Squadron in Calgary. He later served as quartermaster of the 15th Light Horse and while serving with them petitioned the government for permission to create an infantry regiment. In 1910 permission was granted and Armstrong was made lieutenant-colonel in command of the 103rd Regiment (Calgary Rifles). The 103rd remained Calgary's only infantry regiment until 1920 when it was reorganized as The Calgary Regiment. The 103rd Regiment, Calgary Rifles was reorganized in 1920 as part of the Otter Commission's report, and the 103rd is today perpetuated by both The King's Own Calgary Regiment and The Calgary Highlanders (10th Canadians).

Armstrong and his officers of the 103rd helped organize recruits for the 10th Battalion, CEF. Armstrong also personally raised the 56th Battalion (Calgary), CEF and served as its commanding officer, taking it overseas in March 1915. The battalion was broken up for reinforcements when the CEF's reinforcement system was reorganized, and Armstrong returned home from the United Kingdom in mid 1918.

== Sport shooting ==
Armstrong was heavily involved in Calgary's sport-shooting community and under his leadership the 103rd gained a reputation as "probably the best shooting regiment in the whole Dominion." In 1933 Armstrong was given an illuminated address in gratitude for his eleven years of "conscientious service" as honorary secretary of the Alberta Provincial Rifle Association. The address read in part "Colonel Armstrong has added long years of voluntary and devoted service to the cause of marksmanship, both as a sport and as a military exercise." At the presentation Armstrong was praised by George Pearkes, VC, who declared him a "worthy example to the men who were to follow in his footsteps."

== Death ==
Armstrong died on 6 February 1951. His first wife Evelyn Eddy had died in 1915 and his second wife Jessie died in 1927.

== Legacy ==
After his retirement from the military, Armstrong continued to award the 103rd Regiment Shield to the top cadet corps in Calgary.

A portrait of Armstrong painted by Victor Albert Long in 1914 is held by the officers' mess of The Calgary Highlanders (10th Canadians).
