= Alberta Regiment =

The Alberta Regiment
- Active: 1920–1924
- Country: Canada
- Branch: Canadian Militia
- Type: Line infantry
- Role: Infantry
- Size: 7 battalions (2 Active, 5 on paper)
- Part of: Non-Permanent Active Militia
- Garrison/HQ: Medicine Hat and Killam
- Engagements: First World War

The Alberta Regiment was a short-lived infantry regiment of the Non-Permanent Active Militia of the Canadian Militia (now the Canadian Army). The regiment was formed by the reorganization of the 103rd Calgary Rifles into two separate regiments and the incorporation of a number of Canadian Expeditionary Force battalions into the peacetime militia. In 1924, the regiment was split into two separate regiments: The South Alberta Regiment (now part of The South Alberta Light Horse) and The North Alberta Regiment (disbanded in 1936).

== Lineage ==
=== The Alberta Regiment ===
- Originated on 1 April 1910, in Calgary, Alberta, as the 103rd Regiment (Calgary Rifles).
- Reorganized on 15 March 1920, as two separate regiments: The Calgary Regiment (now The King's Own Calgary Regiment (RCAC) and The Calgary Highlanders (10th Canadians)) and The Alberta Regiment.
- Reorganized on 15 May 1924, into two separate regiments: The South Alberta Regiment and The North Alberta Regiment.

== Perpetuations ==
- 31st Battalion (Alberta), CEF
- 113th Battalion (Lethbridge Highlanders), CEF
- 151st (Central Alberta) Battalion, CEF
- 175th (Medicine Hat) Battalion, CEF
- 187th (Central Alberta) Battalion, CEF
- 191st (Southern Alberta) Battalion, CEF

== History ==
On 15 March 1920, as a result of the Otter Commission, The Alberta Regiment was formed by amalgamation of a number of CEF Battalions raised during the First World War as well as the reorganization of the 103rd Regiment Calgary Rifles into two separate regiments: The Calgary Regiment and The Alberta Regiment. Among the CEF battalions the new regiment perpetuated was the 113th Battalion (Lethbridge Highlanders), CEF which had been previously disbanded in 1917. After the disbandment of the 31st Battalion CEF in either August or September 1920, the perpetuation of that unit was also taken up by the Alberta Regiment.

This regiment would be short lived however as on 15 May 1924, The Alberta Regiment was split up into two separate regiments: The North Alberta Regiment (disbanded in 1936) and The South Alberta Regiment (now part of The South Alberta Light Horse).

== Organization ==
=== 1st Battalion, The Alberta Regiment (15 March 1920) ===
- Regimental Headquarters (Medicine Hat)
- A Company (Medicine Hat, AB)
- B Company (Lethbridge)
- C Company (Calgary; later moved October 1922 to Redcliff)
- D Company (Red Deer)

=== 2nd Battalion, The Alberta Regiment (15 March 1920) ===
- Regimental / Battalion Headquarters (Killam)
- A Company (Killam)
- B Company (Camrose)
- C Company (Hardisty)
- D Company (Sedgewick)

=== Reserve battalions ===
The 3rd, 4th, 5th and 6th Battalions only existed on paper.

== Notable members ==
- Lieutenant-Colonel Nelson Spencer, DSO
