= 191st (Southern Alberta) Battalion, CEF =

Canadian military unit (1916–1917)

191st Battalion, CEF
- Active: 1916–1917
- Country: Canada
- Branch: Canadian Expeditionary Force
- Type: Infantry
- Battle honours: The Great War, 1917

Commanders
- Officer commanding: Lieutenant-Colonel Willoughby Charles Bryan

The 191st (South Alberta) Battalion, CEF, was a unit in the Canadian Expeditionary Force during the First World War. Based in Macleod, Alberta, the unit began recruiting during the winter of 1915/16 in that town and the surrounding district. After sailing to England in March 1917, the battalion was absorbed into the 21st Reserve Battalion on June 9, 1917. The 191st (South Alberta) Battalion, CEF, had one officer commanding: Lieutenant-Colonel Willoughby C. Bryan.

Perpetuation of the 191st Battalion was assigned in 1920 to the 7th Battalion of The Alberta Regiment. When that regiment split in two in 1924, the 3rd Battalion of the North Alberta Regiment carried on the perpetuation. The North Albertas disbanded in 1936.

In 1929, the battalion was awarded the theatre of war honour The Great War, 1917.
