= 151st (Central Alberta) Battalion, CEF =

151st Battalion, CEF
- Active: 1915–1916
- Country: Canada
- Branch: Canadian Expeditionary Force
- Type: Infantry
- Battle honours: The Great War, 1916

Commanders
- Officer commanding: LCol J. W. Arnott

The 151st (Central Alberta) Battalion, CEF, was a unit in the Canadian Expeditionary Force during the First World War.

Based in Camp Sarcee near Calgary, Alberta, the unit began recruiting in late 1915 in Strathcona, Battle River, and Red Deer. After sailing to England in October 1916, the battalion was absorbed into the 9th, 11th, and 21st Reserve Battalions on October 13, 1916.

The 151st (Central Alberta) Battalion, CEF, had one officer commanding: Lieutenant-Colonel J. W. Arnott.

Perpetuation of the 151st Battalion was assigned to The Alberta Regiment in 1920. When that regiment split in two in 1924, the North Alberta Regiment carried on the perpetuation. The North Albertas disbanded in 1936.

In 1929, the battalion was awarded the theatre of war honour The Great War, 1916.

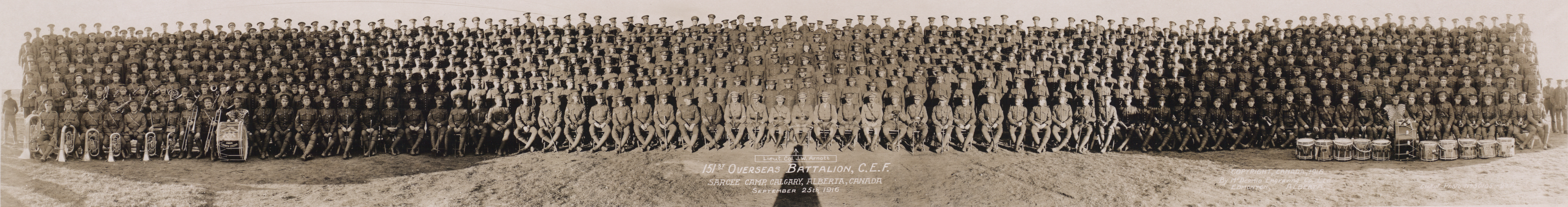
The 151st (Central Alberta) Battalion is one of four units whose glyphs survive on the hillside at Battalion Park in the neighbourhood of Signal Hill, Calgary, Alberta.
