= 137th (Calgary) Battalion, CEF =

Unit in the Canadian Expeditionary Force during the First World War

137th "Overseas" Battalion, CEF
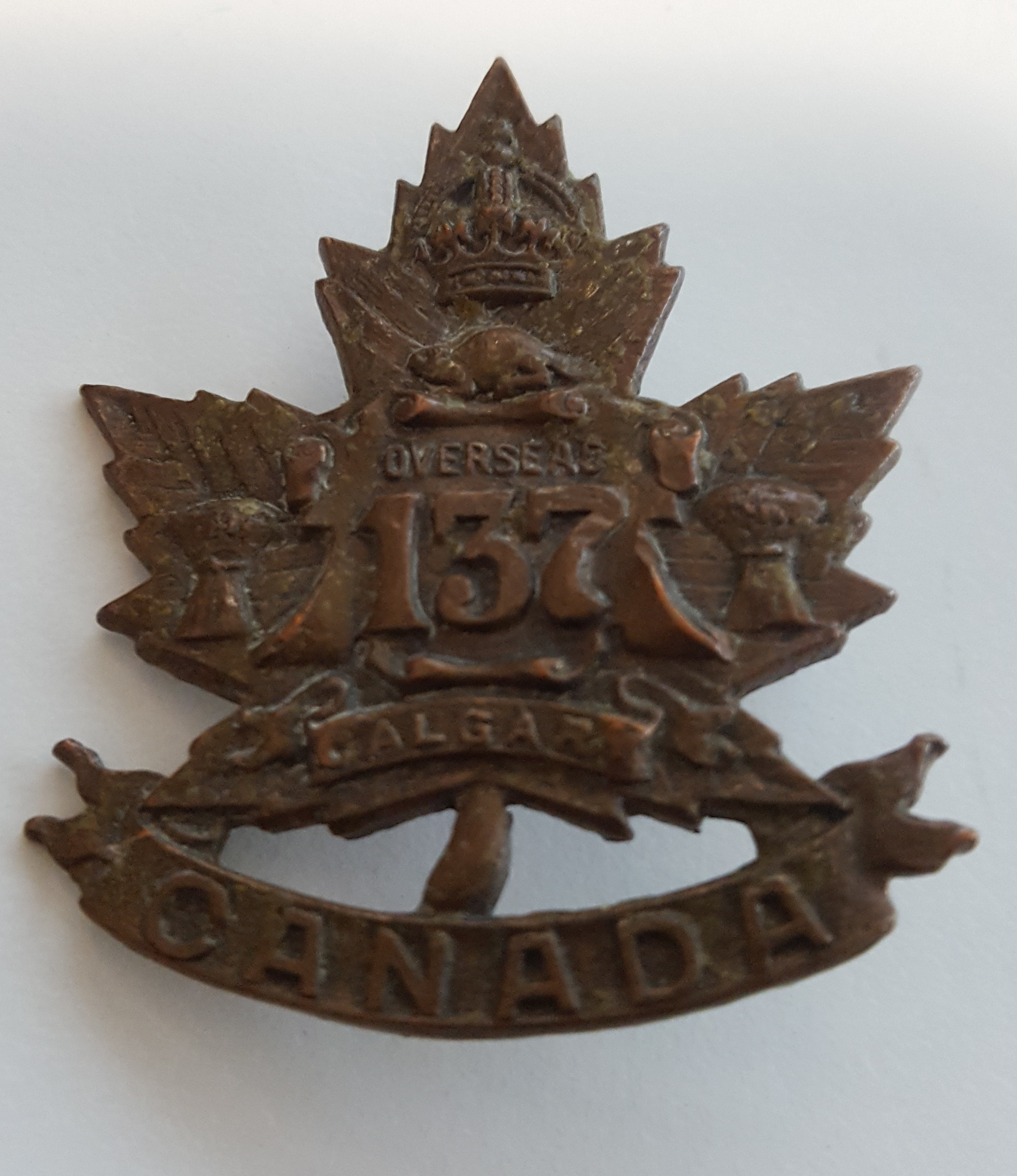
- Cap badge
- Active: 1915–1917
- Disbanded: 1917
- Country: Canada
- Branch: Canadian Expeditionary Force
- Type: Infantry
- Battle honours: The Great War, 1916–17

Commanders
- Commanding officer: Lt-Col G.W. Morfitt

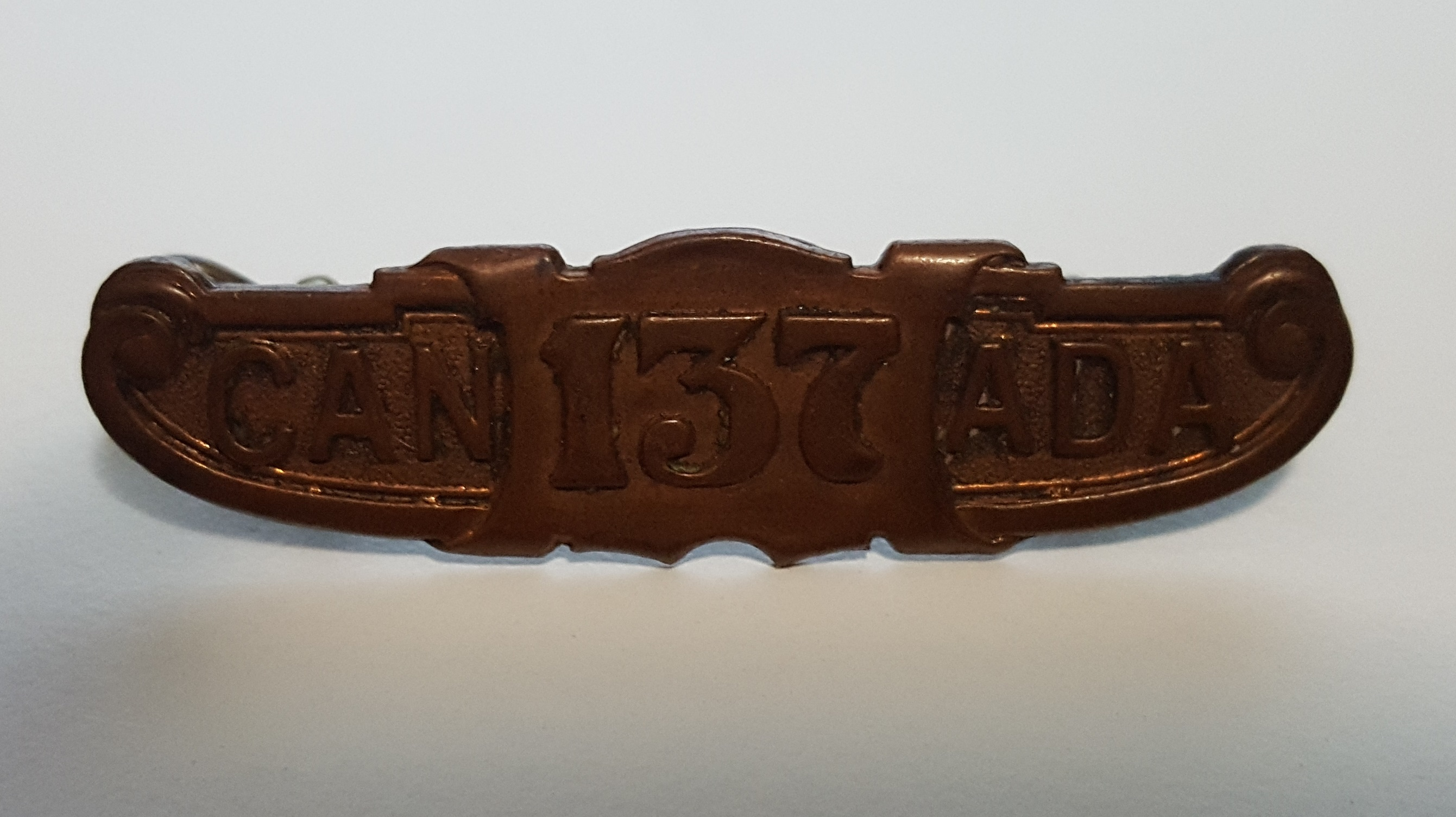
Shoulder title

The 137th Battalion, CEF, was a unit in the Canadian Expeditionary Force during the First World War. Based in Calgary, Alberta, the unit began recruiting in late 1915 in that city. After sailing to England in August 1916, the battalion was absorbed into the 21st Reserve Battalion on January 10, 1917.

The 137th Battalion, CEF, had one officer commanding: Lieutenant-Colonel G.W. Morfitt.

The perpetuation of the battalion was assigned in 1920 to the 5th Battalion, the Calgary Regiment. When the regiment was split in 1924, the perpetuation passed to the 3rd Battalion, the Calgary Regiment. This regiment, now the King's Own Calgary Regiment (RCAC), still perpetuates the 137th Battalion, CEF.

In 1967, members of the 137th Battalion CEF Association raised funds and erected a memorial to the unit on the west side of North Glenmore Park, in Calgary. Members of the King's Own Calgary Regiment commemorate the sacrifices of their fallen comrades each Remembrance Day by sending a contingent to the memorial and conducting a small ceremony of remembrance.

The 137th (Calgary) Battalion CEF is one of only four units whose glyphs survive on the hillside at Battalion Park in the neighbourhood of Signal Hill, Calgary.
