= 31st Battalion (Alberta), CEF =

31st Battalion, CEF
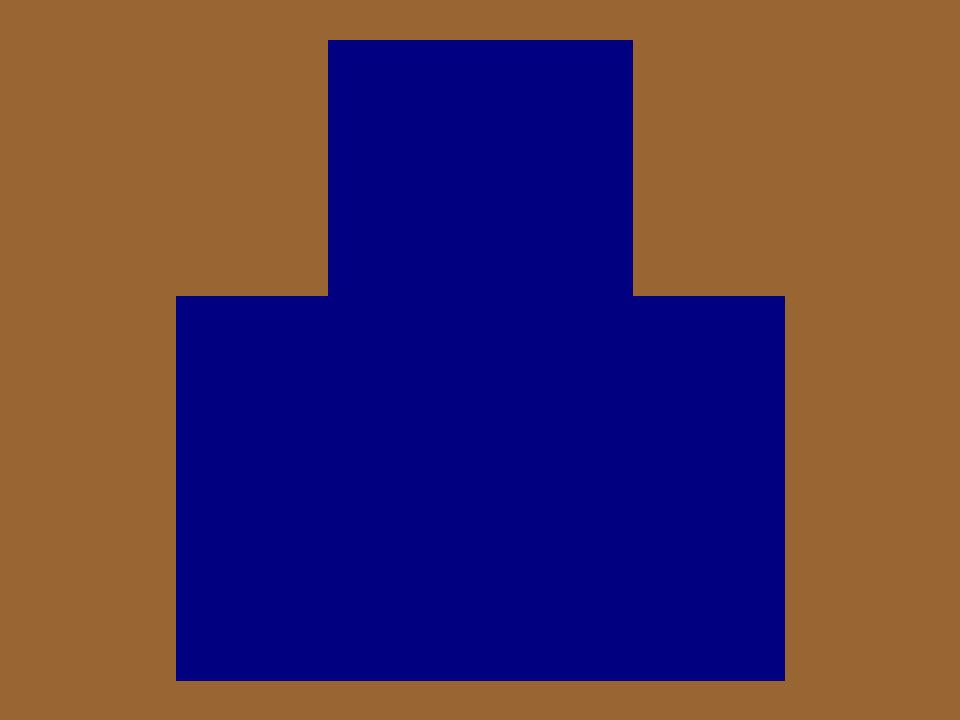
- Distinguishing patch
- Active: 17 November 1914 – 15 September 1920
- Disbanded: 15 September 1920
- Country: Canada
- Branch: Canadian Expeditionary Force
- Type: Infantry
- Size: 1,030 soldiers
- Part of: 6th Brigade, 2nd Canadian Division
- Mobilization headquarters: Calgary
- Nickname: 'Bell's Bulldogs'
- Mascot: 'Heinie' (Russian pony)
- Engagements: St. Eloi Craters, Ypres, Vierstraat, The Somme, Vimy Ridge, Lens, Passchendaele, Amiens, Arras, Cambrai, Valencienne, Mons
- Battle honours: Mount Sorrel; Somme, 1916; Flers–Courcelette; Thiepval Ridge; Ancre Heights; Arras, 1917, '18; Vimy, 1917; Arleux; Scarpe, 1917; Hill 70; Ypres, 1917; Passchendaele; Somme, 1918; Amiens; Scarpe, 1918; Drocourt–Quéant; Hindenburg Line; Canal du Nord; Cambrai, 1918; Pursuit to Mons; France and Flanders, 1915–18

Commanders
- Notable commanders: LCol Arthur Henry Bell, CMG, DSO; LCol Nelson Spencer

The 31st Battalion (Alberta), CEF, was an infantry battalion of the Canadian Expeditionary Force during the Great War. The battalion recruited in Alberta and was mobilized at Calgary. The battalion was authorized in November 1914 and embarked for Britain on 17 May 1915. On 18 September 1915 it disembarked in France, where it fought with the 6th Infantry Brigade, 2nd Canadian Division in France and Flanders until the end of the war. The battalion was disbanded in August 1920.

== History ==
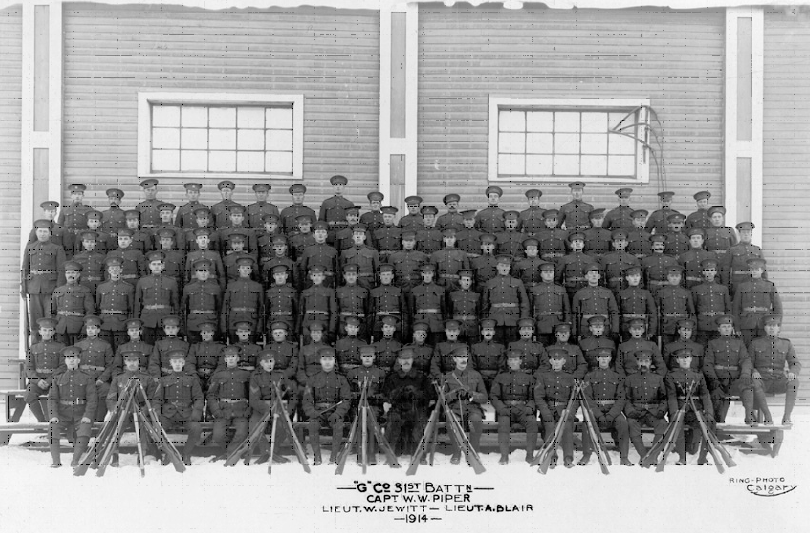
'G' Company, 31st Battalion, Canadian Expeditionary Force in Calgary 1914.

The battalion was raised at Calgary, and started recruitment in Alberta, on 7 November 1914.

The battalion commander until late in the war was Lieutenant-Colonel Arthur Henry Bell of Calgary. On 17 May 1915, the battalion sailed for England on RMS Carpathia, with a complement of 36 officers and 1033 other ranks. After initial training in England, the battalion fought in Belgium and France, and was often at the forefront of the fighting at St. Eloi Craters, the Ypres Salient, Vimy Ridge (Thélus Village), Fresnoy, Somme, Second Battle of Passchendaele, the Battle of Amiens (1918), the Battle of Arras (1917), Battle of Drocourt-Quéant Line, Valenciennes, Mons, and the occupation of the Rhineland.

The battalion captured a Siberian pony from the Germans, which apparently had been captured from the Russians earlier in the war. The Canadians named this pony Heinie, and it became the 31st Battalion's mascot. After the war the 31st brought Heinie to Alberta, where it worked until at least the late 1920s for the Dominion Parks Branch near Banff, Alberta.

The bulk of the battalion returned to Canada on SS Cedric on 27 May 1919, and to Calgary on 1 June 1919, with the unit's disbandment occurring on 30 August 1920.

Through the course of the First World War, the 31st Battalion suffered losses of 941 dead, and an additional 2,312 non-fatal casualties. A total of 4,487 men served in the battalion.

== Perpetuation ==
The 31st Battalion (Alberta), CEF, is perpetuated by the South Alberta Light Horse. Perpetuation of the 31st Battalion was assigned to The Alberta Regiment in 1920. When this regiment split in 1924, both the South Alberta Regiment and the North Alberta Regiment carried the perpetuation. The North Albertas disbanded in 1936. The South Alberta Regiment merged into the South Alberta Light Horse (29th Armoured Regiment) in 1954.

== Commanding Officers ==
The 31st battalion had three Officers Commanding:

- Lieutenant-Colonel A.H. Bell, DSO, 29 May 1915 – 23 April 1918
- Lieutenant-Colonel E.S. Doughty, DSO, 23 April 1918 – 6 October 1918
- Lieutenant-Colonel N. Spencer, DSO, 6 October 1918-Demobilization

== Battle honours ==
The 31st Battalion was awarded the following honours:

- Mount Sorrel
- Somme, 1916, '18
- Flers–Courcelette
- Thiepval
- Ancre Heights
- Ancre, 1916
- Arras, 1917, '18
- Vimy, 1917
- Arleux
- Scarpe, 1917, '18
- Hill 70
- Ypres, 1917
- Passchendaele
- Amiens
- Drocourt–Quéant
- Hindenburg Line
- Canal du Nord
- Cambrai, 1918
- Pursuit to Mons
- France and Flanders, 1915–18

== See also ==
- List of infantry battalions in the Canadian Expeditionary Force

== Sources ==
- Canadian Expeditionary Force 1914-1919 by Col. G.W.L. Nicholson, CD, Queen's Printer, Ottawa, Ontario, 1962
- Singer, Major Horace C. (Ed. Darrell Knight) History of the 31st Canadian Infantry Battalion C.E.F. . (Calgary: Detselig Publishing, 2006). ISBN 1-55059-316-1.
- Dorosh, Michael A. Calgary's Infantry Regiment: A Pictorial History of The Calgary Highlanders (Calgary Highlanders Regimental Funds Foundation, 2024). ISBN 9780969461647
