= Saint-Lambert, Calvados =

Saint-Lambert
- Commune
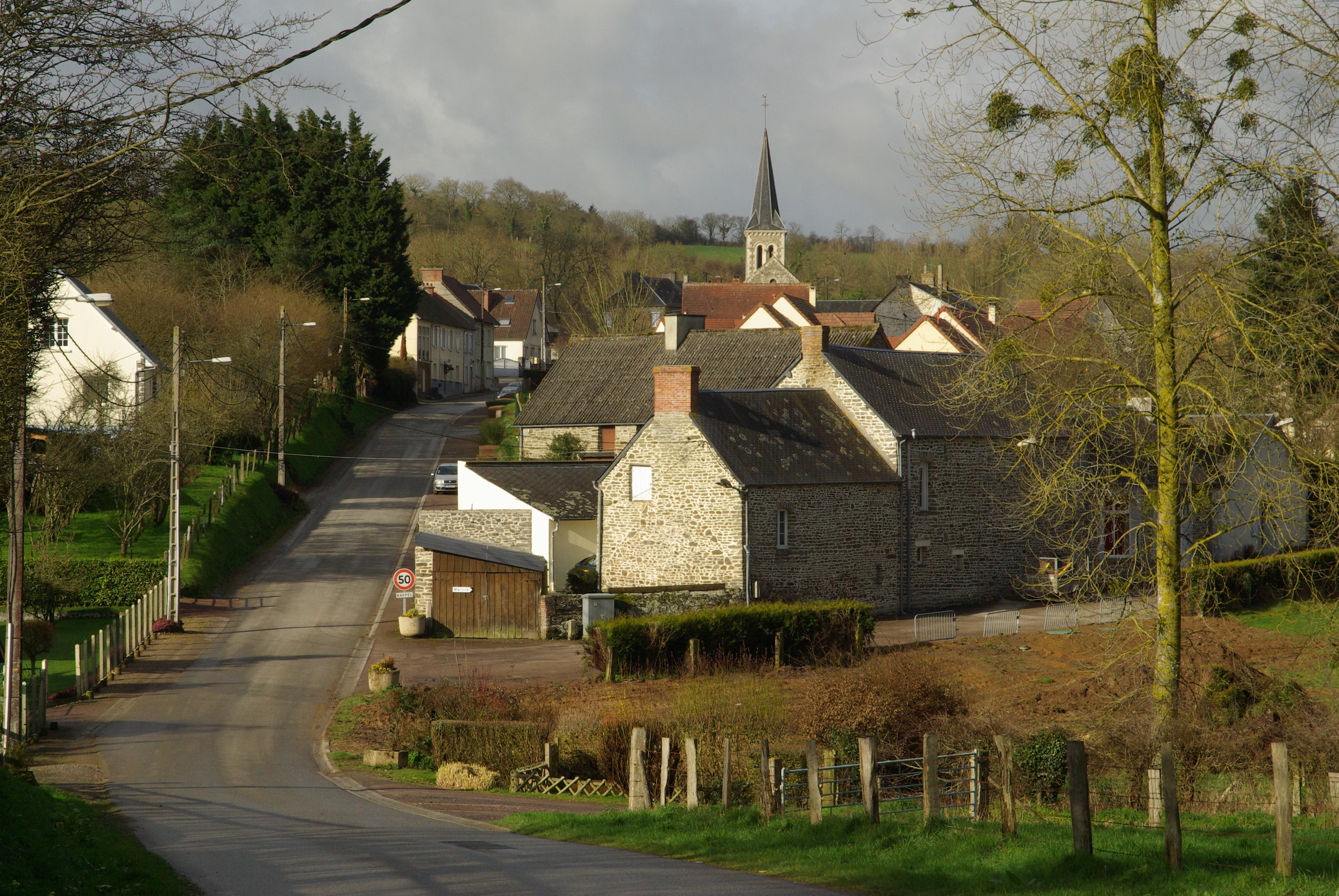
- A general view of Saint-Lambert
- Location of Saint-Lambert
- Location within France Location within Normandy
- Coordinates: 48°56′15″N 0°32′56″W
- Country: France
- Region: Normandy
- Department: Calvados
- Arrondissement: Caen
- Canton: Le Hom
- Intercommunality: Cingal-Suisse Normande

Government
  - Mayor (2020–2026): Daniel Morel
- Area^{1}: 7.45 km^{2} (2.88 sq mi)
- Elevation: 266 m (873 ft)
- Highest elevation: 264 m (866 ft)
- Lowest elevation: 29 m (95 ft)
- Population (2023): 262
  - Density: 35.2/km^{2} (91.1/sq mi)
- Time zone: UTC+01:00 (CET)
  - Summer (DST): UTC+02:00 (CEST)
- INSEE/Postal code: 14602 /14570
- ^{1} French Land Register data, which excludes lakes, ponds, glaciers > 1 km^{2} (0.386 sq mi or 247 acres) and river estuaries.

Saint-Lambert (French pronunciation: [sɛ̃ lɑ̃bɛʁ]) is a commune in the Calvados department in the Normandy region in northwestern France.

== Geography ==
The commune is part of the area known as Suisse Normande.

The commune is made up of the following collection of villages and hamlets, La Prévotière, Le Bisson, Le Jardin, La Vardière, La Bondinière, La Loge and Saint-Lambert.

The river Orne plus three streams The Herbion, The Hamelet and The Val Fournet are the four watercourses running through the commune.

== Population ==
Historical population
Year	Pop.	±% p.a.
1968	269	—
1975	253	−0.87%
1982	220	−1.98%
1990	219	−0.06%
1999	201	−0.95%
2007	235	+1.97%
2012	262	+2.20%
2017	275	+0.97%
2023	262	−0.80%
Source: INSEE

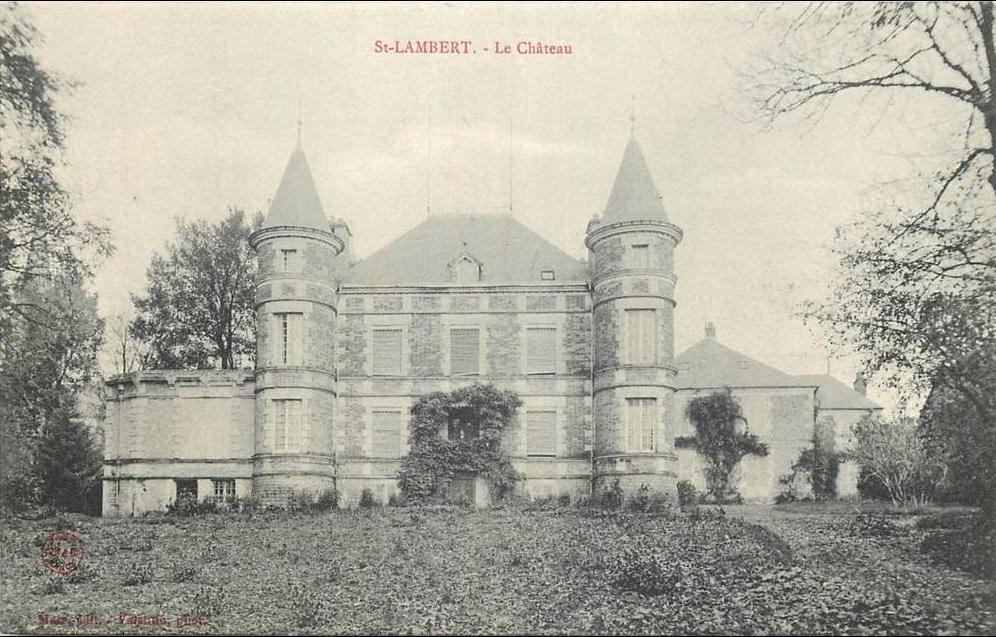
Saint-Lambert - Le Chateau old postcard

== See also ==
- Communes of the Calvados department
