= Leopard 2A4M CAN =

Canadian Leopard 2A4 Variant

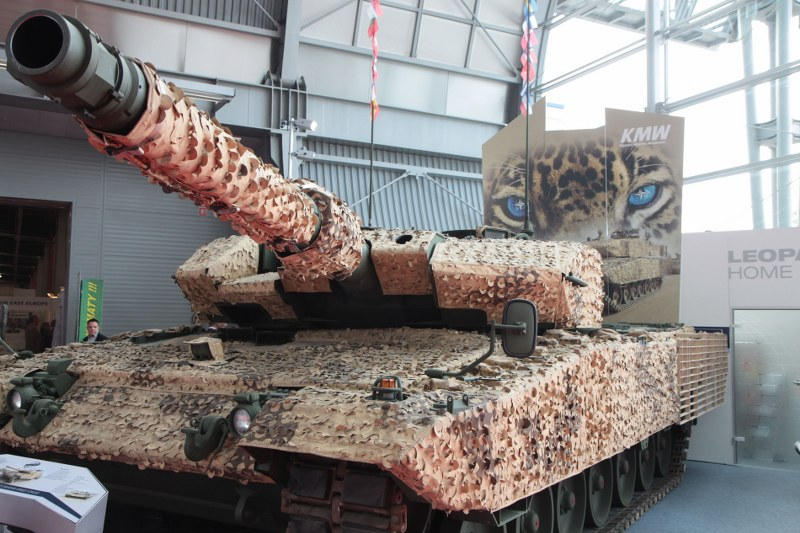
- Leopard 2A4M CAN on display at the MSPO in Poland, 2012
- Type: Main battle tank
- Place of origin: Germany

Service history
- In service: Canadian Army
- Wars: War in Afghanistan (Dec. 2010 - Jul. 2011)

Production history
- Designer: KMW
- Developed from: Leopard 2A4
- Produced: 2009
- No. built: 20

Specifications
- Mass: Empty - 55,150 kilograms (55.15 t) Combat - 57,200 kilograms (57.2 t)
- Length: 9.67 metres (31.7 ft)
- Width: 3.70 metres (12.1 ft)
- Height: 2.90 metres (9.5 ft)
- Crew: 4
- Armor: Composite armor, add-on slat armor, and anti-mine armor
- Main armament: 1 x Rh-120 L/44
- Secondary armament: 2 x C6 7.62-mm coaxial medium machine gun
- Engine: MTU MB 873 Ka-501; 1,500 hp (1,100 kW)
- Fuel capacity: 1,160 litres (255 imperial gallons; 306 US gallons)
- Operational range: On-road - 340 kilometres (210 mi); Off-road - 220 kilometres (140 mi)
- Maximum speed: On-road - 68 kilometres per hour (42 mph); Off-road - 40 kilometres per hour (25 mph)

The Leopard 2A4M CAN is a Canadian export variant of the Leopard 2 main battle tank developed by German defense company KMW. After the lessons learnt by the Canadian Army with the Leopard 2A4M and 2A6M in Afghanistan, they partnered with KMW to implement the upgrades they saw necessary. This includes the "M" mine protection armor, generally increased protection, a new electrical drive, and improved crew cooling.

== Development ==
After using the Leopard 2A6M with increased belly armor in Afghanistan, the Canadian armed forces saw the need for a similarly-improved Leopard 2A4. To accomplish this, the Leopard 2A4M CAN also received the "M" mine protection armor (but not the side bar armor) to protect the tank from anti-tank mines and IEDs, as well as an improved electrical drive, improved gunner's optics and commander controls, and better crew cooling. Though originally planned to be up-gunned to the Rheinmetall L/55 for consistency with the 2A6M CAN, the longer barrelled guns (optimised for tank-vs-tank warfare) were found to be less than ideal in Afghanistan, therefore it was decided to retain the L/44. Only small areas of slat armor were added, in contrast with the fully caged 2A6M CANs. The protection of the Leopard 2A4M CAN has been further augmented by the addition of applique armor resembling that found on the most recent Leopard 2A7+ variant, but modified to fit the turret configuration of the 2A4.

== Operational history ==
=== Afghanistan ===
In July 2009, Canada commissioned KMW to upgrade 20 2A4s to the standard of the 2A6M. These 2A4s would be refitted at KMW's Munich facility. They were then delivered to the Canadian Army in October 2010, after which five were deployed to Hindu Kush, Afghanistan where they supported ISAF forces until July 2011 when combat operations halted.

=== Latvia ===
In June 2023, Canadian Minister of Defense Anita Anand announced that 15 of the 2A4M CANs (and the necessary support personnel and equipment) would be deployed to Latvia to bolster NATO's military strength in Eastern Europe. The justification behind this was increasing defensive presence in the region during the Russo-Ukrainian War. These tanks were delivered on November 10 of the same year.
