= 56th Battalion (Calgary), CEF =

56th Battalion, CEF
- Active: 1914–1916
- Country: Canada
- Branch: Canadian Expeditionary Force
- Type: Infantry
- Battle honours: The Great War, 1915–16

Commanders
- Commanding officer: Lt-Col William Charles Gordon Armstrong

The 56th Battalion (Calgary), CEF, was an infantry battalion of the Canadian Expeditionary Force during the First World War. The 56th Battalion was authorized on 7 November 1914 and embarked for Britain on 20 March 1916. It provided reinforcements for the Canadian Corps in the field until 6 July 1916, when its personnel were absorbed by the 9th Reserve Battalion, CEF. The battalion was disbanded on 15 September 1917.

The battalion recruited in and was mobilized at Calgary, Alberta.

The battalion was commanded by Lieutenant-Colonel William Charles Gordon Armstrong from 1 April 1916 to 6 July 1916.

Members of the battalion included future Calgary Mayor James Cameron Watson, oilman Eric Harvie, and Scottish footballer William Strang.

The 56th Battalion was awarded the battle honour The Great War, 1915–16.

The 56th Battalion (Calgary), CEF is perpetuated by the Calgary Highlanders.

== Sources ==
- Canadian Expeditionary Force 1914-1919 by Col. G.W.L. Nicholson, CD, Queen's Printer, Ottawa, Ontario, 1962
- Dorosh, Michael A. Calgary's Infantry Regiment: A Pictorial History of The Calgary Highlanders (Calgary Highlanders Regimental Funds Foundation, 2024). ISBN 9780969461647
