= Oxford Rifles =

Canadian infantry regiment

The Oxford Rifles
- Active: 1863–1954
- Country: Canada
- Branch: Canadian Militia (1863–1940); Canadian Army (1940–1954)
- Type: Rifles
- Role: Infantry
- Size: One battalion
- Part of: Non-Permanent Active Militia (1863–1940); Royal Canadian Infantry Corps (1942–1954)
- Garrison/HQ: Woodstock, Ontario
- Engagements: Fenian Raids; Second Boer War; First World War; Second World War
- Battle honours: See #Battle honours

The Oxford Rifles were an infantry regiment of the Non-Permanent Active Militia of the Canadian Militia (now the Canadian Army). In 1954, the regiment was amalgamated with The Canadian Fusiliers (City of London Regiment) to form The London and Oxford Fusiliers (now the reserve battalion of the Royal Canadian Regiment).

== Lineage ==
- Originated on 14 August 1863, in Woodstock, Ontario, as the 22nd Battalion Volunteer Militia Rifles, Canada (The Oxford Rifles).
- Redesignated on 13 April 1866, as the 22nd Battalion The Oxford Rifles.
- Redesignated on 8 May 1900, as the 22nd Regiment The Oxford Rifles.
- Redesignated on 29 March 1920, as The Oxford Rifles.
- Redesignated on 18 March 1942, as the 2nd (Reserve) Battalion, The Oxford Rifles.
- Redesignated on 1 June 1945, as The Oxford Rifles.
- Amalgamated on 1 October 1954, with The Canadian Fusiliers (City of London Regiment) (Machine Gun) and redesignated as The London and Oxford Fusiliers (3rd Battalion, The Royal Canadian Regiment).

== Perpetuations ==
- 71st Battalion, CEF
- 168th Battalion (Oxfords), CEF

== History ==
=== Oxford Militia ===
In its early days, the 1st Regiment of Oxford Militia in Oxford County served in the War of 1812. They saw action at:

- Siege of Detroit (16 August 1812)
- Battle of Frenchman's Creek (28 November 1812)
- Battle of Nanticoke Creek (13 November 1813)
- Battle of Lundy's Lane (25 July 1814)
- Battle of Malcolm's Mills (6 November 1814).

The 1st Oxford Militia was commanded by Lt-Col. Henry Bostwick, with Major Sykes Tousley and Major William Brown. The company commanders were:

- 1st Flank Company—Captain Marvil White, Lieutenants Joseph Baker, John Williams
- 2nd Flank Company—Captain John Carroll, Lieutenant William Botsford
- Rifle Company—Captain Bla Brewster Brigham, Lieutenant Abner Owen
- Curtis's Company—Captain David Curtis, Lieutenant Jacob Yeigh
- Hall's Company—Captain Ichabod Hall, Lieutenant Daniel Brown
- Malcolm's Company—Captain John Malcolm, Lieutenant William Teeple

During the Upper Canada Rebellion of 1837, the Oxford Militia again saw action, most notably taking part in the Caroline affair.

With the passing of the Militia Act of 1855, the first of a number of newly-raised independent militia companies were established in and around the Oxford County-area of Canada West (now the Province of Ontario). These companies were:

- 1st Volunteer Militia Rifle Company of Woodstock—raised on 8 May 1856
- Embro Highland Rifle Company—raised on 22 January 1862
- Beachville Rifle Company—raised on 26 December 1862
- Wolverton Rifle Company—raised on 16 January 1863
- North Oxford Infantry Company—raised on 23 January 1863
- Princeton Rifle Company—raised on 23 January 1863

On 14 August 1863, the 22nd Battalion Volunteer Militia Rifles, Canada (The Oxford Rifles) was authorized for service in Woodstock by the regimentation of six of these previously authorized independent rifle and infantry companies.

=== Fenian Raids ===
In 1864, the 22nd Battalion Volunteer Militia Rifles, Canada (The Oxford Rifles) were called upon to provide two companies for border service in Canada East during the Fenian raids. On 1 June 1866, The 22nd Battalion The Oxford Rifles were called out on active service with all eight companies serving at Ridgeway, Fort Erie, Sarnia, and along the St. Clair frontier. On 22 June 1866, the battalion was stood down from active service.

=== South African War ===
In 1899, the 22nd Battalion The Oxford Rifles provided a detachment of men for the 2nd (Special Service) Battalion, Royal Canadian Regiment for service in the South African War.

=== Great War ===
On 6 August 1914, detachments of the 22nd Regiment The Oxford Rifles were placed on active service for local protection duties, guarding public works and buildings.

A large detachment of the regiment along with other detachments from the 24th Grey's Horse and the 7th Regiment Fusiliers went on to form the 1st Battalion (Ontario Regiment), CEF for service in the First Contingent of the Canadian Expeditionary Force.

On 1 April 1916, the 71st Battalion, CEF, was authorized for service and embarked for the United Kingdom. After its arrival in the UK, the battalion provided reinforcements to the Canadian Corps in the field. On 30 September 1916, the battalion’s personnel were absorbed by the 44th Battalion (Manitoba), CEF, the 54th Battalion (Kootenay), CEF and the 74th Battalion, CEF. On 11 April 1918, the 71st Battalion, CEF was finally disbanded.

On 22 December 1915, the 168th Battalion (Oxfords), CEF was authorized for service, and on 30 October 1916, the battalion embarked for the United Kingdom. On 4 January 1917, the battalion’s personnel were absorbed by the 4th and 6th Reserve Battalions, CEF, to provide reinforcements for the Canadian Corps in the field. On 4 April 1918, the 168th Battalion, CEF was disbanded.

Over 2,500 men from the Oxford Rifles would serve in CEF units from the start until the Armistice in 1918.

=== 1920s–1930s ===
On 29 March 1920, as a result of the Otter Commission, the 22nd Regiment The Oxford Rifles were renamed as The Oxford Rifles. Its old regimental number was then taken by the new Permanent Force regiment, the Royal 22nd Regiment.

=== Second World War ===
On 18 March 1942, The Oxford Rifles mobilized the 1st Battalion, The Oxford Rifles, CASF for active service. The battalion served in Canada in a home defence role on as part of the following units:

- 14th Canadian Infantry Brigade Group, 6th Canadian Infantry Division
- 16th Canadian Infantry Brigade, 7th Canadian Infantry Division
- 16th Canadian Infantry Brigade, Pacific Command.

On 2 January 1945, the battalion embarked for Great Britain, where on 10 January 1945, it was disbanded to provide reinforcements for the First Canadian Army.

=== Post war ===
Post war, The Oxford Rifles resumed their role as an infantry regiment in the Canadian Army Reserve.

On 1 October 1954, as a result on the Kennedy Report on the Reserve Army, The Oxford Rifles were amalgamated with The Canadian Fusiliers (City of London Regiment) to become The London and Oxford Fusiliers (3rd Battalion, The Royal Canadian Regiment) and subsequently became the reserve battalion of the RCR.

== Organization ==
=== 22nd Battalion Volunteer Militia Rifles, Canada (The Oxford Rifles) (14 August 1863) ===
- No. 1 Company (Woodstock) (first raised on 8 May 1856 as The 1st Volunteer Militia Rifle Company of Woodstock).
- No. 2 Company (Highland) (Embro) (first raised on 22 January 1862 as the Volunteer Highland Rifle Company).
- No. 3 Company (Beachville) (first raised on 26 December 1862 as a Volunteer Militia Company of Rifles).
- No. 4 Company (Wolverton) (first raised on 16 January 1863 as a Volunteer Militia Company of Rifles).
- No. 5 Company (township of North Oxford) (first raised on 23 January 1863 as a Volunteer Militia Company of Rifles).
- No. 6 Company (Princeton) (first raised on 23 January 1863 as a Volunteer Militia Company of Rifles).

=== The Oxford Rifles (29 March 1920) ===
- Regimental Headquarters (Woodstock)
- A Company (Woodstock)
- B Company (Woodstock)
- C Company (Woodstock)
- D Company (Ingersoll)

== Battle honours ==
- Somme, 1916
- Arras, 1917, '18
- Hill 70
- Ypres, 1917
- Amiens
- Hindenburg Line
- Pursuit to Mons
