= Canadian Fusiliers (City of London Regiment) =

The Canadian Fusiliers (City of London Regiment)
- Active: 1866–1954
- Country: Canada
- Branch: Canadian Militia (1866–1940); Canadian Army (1940–1954)
- Type: Fusiliers
- Role: Infantry
- Size: One battalion
- Part of: Non-Permanent Active Militia (1866–1940); Royal Canadian Infantry Corps (1942–1954)
- Garrison/HQ: London, Ontario
- Engagements: Fenian Raids; North-West Rebellion; Second Boer War; First World War; Second World War
- Battle honours: See #Battle honours

The Canadian Fusiliers (City of London Regiment) was an infantry regiment of the Non-Permanent Active Militia of the Canadian Militia (now the Canadian Army). In 1954, the regiment was amalgamated with the Oxford Rifles to form the London and Oxford Fusiliers (now the reserve battalion of the Royal Canadian Regiment).

== Lineage ==
=== The Canadian Fusiliers (City of London Regiment) ===
- Originated on 27 April 1866, in London, Canada West, as the 7th Battalion Infantry (Prince Arthur's Own).
- Redesignated on 1 May 1866 as the 7th Battalion Infantry.
- Redesignated on 15 February 1867 as the 7th Battalion London Light Infantry.
- Redesignated on 16 January 1880 as the 7th Battalion Fusiliers.
- Redesignated on 8 May 1900 as the 7th Regiment Fusiliers.
- Redesignated on 29 March 1920 The Western Ontario Regiment.
- Redesignated on 1 August 1924 as The Canadian Fusiliers (City of London Regiment).
- Amalgamated on 15 December 1936 with the Headquarters and A Company of the 2nd Machine Gun Battalion, CMGC and redesignated as The Canadian Fusiliers (City of London Regiment) (Machine Gun).
- Redesignated on 29 January 1942 as the 2nd (Reserve) Battalion, The Canadian Fusiliers (City of London Regiment).
- Redesignated on 24 March 1942 as the 2nd (Reserve) Battalion, The Canadian Fusiliers (City of London Regiment) (Machine Gun).
- Redesignated on 1 April 1946 as The Canadian Fusiliers (City of London Regiment) (Machine Gun).
- Amalgamated on 1 October 1954 with the Oxford Rifles and redesignated as The London and Oxford Fusiliers (3rd Battalion, The Royal Canadian Regiment).

=== 2nd Machine Gun Battalion, CMGC ===
- Originated on 1 June 1919 in London, Ontario, as the 2nd Machine Gun Brigade, CMGC.
- Redesignated on 15 September 1924 as the 2nd Machine Gun Battalion, CMGC.
- Amalgamated on 15 December 1936 with The Canadian Fusiliers (City of London Regiment).

== Perpetuations ==
- 1st Battalion (Ontario Regiment), CEF
- 33rd Battalion, CEF
- 142nd Battalion (London's Own), CEF

== History ==
=== Early years ===
The history of the Canadian Militia in the London area of Ontario dates as far back of the early 1800s, most notably with units of the 1st Middlesex Militia serving during the War of 1812.

With the passing of the Militia Act of 1855, the first of a number of newly raised independent militia companies were established in and around the London area of Canada West (now Ontario).

On 27 April 1866, the 7th Battalion Infantry (Prince Arthur's Own) was authorized for service in London by the regimentation of six of these previously authorized independent artillery, rifle and infantry companies.

=== Fenian Raids ===
On 1 June 1866, the 7th Battalion Infantry (Prince Arthur's Own) were called out on active service. The battalion served on the St. Clair frontier and was removed from active service on 22 June 1866. A few years later on 12 April 1870, Two companies from the 7th Battalion, London Light Infantry, were called out on active service. They served on the St. Clair frontier and were removed from active service on 21 April 1870.

=== North West Rebellion ===
On 10 April 1885, the 7th Battalion, Fusiliers, were mobilized for active service. It served as part of the Alberta Column of the North West Field Force. At the end of hostilities. the battalion was removed from active service on 24 July 1885.

=== South African War ===
During the South African War, the 7th Battalion, Fusiliers, contributed volunteers for the Canadian Contingents, most notably for the 2nd (Special Service) Battalion, Royal Canadian Regiment.

=== Early 1900s ===
On 8 May 1900, the 7th Battalion, Fusiliers, was reorganized and redesignated as the 7th Regiment, Fusiliers.

=== First World War ===
On 6 August 1914, details of the 7th Regiment, Fusiliers, were placed on active service for local protection duties.

On 10 August 1914, the 1st Battalion (Ontario Regiment), CEF was authorized for service, and on 26 September 1914, the battalion embarked for Great Britain as part of the First Contingent of the Canadian Expeditionary Force. On 12 February 1915, the battalion disembarked in France, where it fought as part of the 1st Canadian Brigade, 1st Canadian Division, in France and Flanders until the end of the war. Upon its return to Canada, on 15 September 1920, the 1st Battalion, CEF, was disbanded.

On 7 November 1914, the 33rd Battalion, CEF, was authorized for service and on 1 April 1916, the battalion embarked for Great Britain. Upon its arrival in the UK, on 6 April 1916, the battalion was redesignated the 33rd Reserve Battalion, CEF, and provided reinforcements for the Canadian Corps in the field. On 6 July 1916, the battalion's personnel were absorbed by the 36th Battalion, CEF. On 17 July 1917, the 33rd Battalion, CEF, was disbanded.

On 22 December 1915, the 142nd Battalion (London's Own), CEF, was authorized for service and on 31 October 1916, the battalion embarked for Great Britain. Upon its arrival in the UK, on 12 November 1916, the battalion's personnel were absorbed by the 23rd Reserve Battalion, CEF, and provided reinforcements for the Canadian Corps in the field. On 27 July 1917, the 142nd Battalion, CEF, was disbanded.

=== 1920s–1930s ===
On 29 March 1920, as a result of the Otter Commission and the following post-war reorganization of the militia, the 7th Regiment Fusiliers was redesignated as the Western Ontario Regiment and was reorganized with three battalions to perpetuate the assigned war-raised battalions of the Canadian Expeditionary Force. On 1 August 1924, the regiment was again redesignated as the Canadian Fusiliers (City of London Regiment).

As a result of the 1936 Canadian Militia reorganization, on 15 December 1936, the Canadian Fusiliers (City of London Regiment) was amalgamated with the Headquarters and A Company of the 2nd Machine Gun Battalion, Canadian Machine Gun Corps, and redesignated as the Canadian Fusiliers (City of London Regiment) (Machine Gun), and were re-tasked as an infantry battalion (machine gun).

=== Second World War ===
On 29 January 1942, the 1st Battalion, The Canadian Fusiliers (City of London Regiment), CASF, was mobilized for active service. It served in Canada in a home defence role as part of Pacific Command and as the machine gun battalion of the 6th Canadian Infantry Division.

In late 1943, the 1st Battalion, The Canadian Fusiliers (City of London Regiment) was reassigned to the 13th Canadian Infantry Brigade Group of the 6th Canadian Infantry Division and took part in the expedition to Kiska, Alaska, serving there from 16 August 1943 to 22 December 1943.

On 28 May 1944, the 1st Battalion embarked for the UK and later on 1 November 1944, it was redesignated the 2nd Canadian Infantry Training Battalion, Type A (Canadian Fusiliers), CASF. On 10 August 1945, the overseas battalion was disbanded.

=== Post war and amalgamation ===
Post war, the Canadian Fusiliers resumed their role as an infantry regiment in the Canadian Army Reserve.

On 1 October 1954, as a result on the Kennedy Report on the Reserve Army, the Canadian Fusiliers were amalgamated with the Oxford Rifles to become the London and Oxford Fusiliers (3rd Battalion, The Royal Canadian Regiment) and subsequently became the reserve battalion of the RCR.

== Organization ==
=== 7th Battalion Infantry (Prince Arthur's Own) (27 April 1866) ===
- No. 1 Company (London, Canada West) (first raised on 22 January 1862 as the Volunteer Militia Foot Artillery Company).
- No. 2 Company (London) (first raised on 23 January 1863 as the 2nd Volunteer Militia Company of Infantry).
- No. 3 Company (London) (first raised on 26 December 1862 as The Merchants Volunteer Rifle Company of London).
- No. 4 Company (London) (first raised on 24 March 1865 as the Volunteer Rifle Company).
- No. 5 Company (London) (first raised on 7 August 1856 as The London Highland Volunteer Rifle Company).
- No. 6 Company (London) (first raised on 20 March 1856 as the 2nd Volunteer Militia Rifle Company of London).

=== The Western Ontario Regiment (15 April 1920) ===
- 1st Battalion (perpetuating the 1st Battalion, CEF)
- 2nd Battalion (perpetuating the 33rd Battalion, CEF)
- 3rd Battalion (perpetuating 142nd, Battalion CEF)

=== The Canadian Fusiliers (City of London Regiment) (M.G.) (15 December 1936) ===
- Regimental Headquarters (London, Ontario)
- A Company (London)
- B Company (London)
- C Company (London)
- D Company (London)

== Alliances ==
- United Kingdom - Royal Fusiliers (City of London Regiment) (until 1954)

== Uniform ==
When the 7th Battalion London Light Infantry was redesignated in 1880 as the 7th Battalion Fusiliers, as with many of the units of the Canadian Militia, the regiment chose to model itself like that of its counterpart in the British Army, in this case that of the Royal Fusiliers (City of London Regiment), itself formerly the 7th Regiment of Foot (Royal Fusiliers). As such, the 7th Fusiliers adopted a similar uniform.

This uniform consisted of a scarlet tunic with royal blue facings and dark blue trousers with a red stripe. The regimental headdress consisted of the bearskin fusilier busby with a white plume similar to that of its British Army counterpart.

== Battle honours ==
=== North West Rebellion ===
- North West Canada, 1885

=== South African War ===
- South Africa, 1899–1900

=== Great War ===
- Ypres, 1915, '17
- Gravenstafel
- St. Julien
- Festubert, 1915
- Mount Sorrel
- Somme, 1916
- Pozières
- Flers-Courcelette
- Ancre Heights
- Arras, 1917, '18
- Vimy, 1917
- Arleux
- Scarpe, 1917, '18
- Hill 70
- Passchendaele
- Amiens
- Drocourt-Quéant
- Hindenburg Line
- Canal du Nord
- Pursuit to Mons
- France and Flanders, 1915–18

== Notable members ==
- Honorary Colonel Sir John Carling
- Major Hume Cronyn
