= 24th Regiment Grey's Horse =

24th Grey's Horse / 9th Grey's Horse
- Active: 1908–1936
- Country: Canada
- Branch: Canadian Militia
- Type: Line cavalry
- Role: Cavalry
- Size: One regiment
- Part of: Non-Permanent Active Militia
- Garrison/HQ: Wingham, Ontario

The 24th Regiment Grey's Horse was a Canadian Militia cavalry regiment and part of the Non-Permanent Active Militia.

== History ==
The regiment was originally formed in Oxford County, Ontario and Waterloo County, Ontario, on April 2, 1908, and named in honour of Albert Grey, 4th Earl Grey, Governor General of Canada. The regiment was headquartered in Woodstock with squadrons in Woodstock and Ingersoll. Its lineage can be traced to 1798 with The Oxford Rifles.

In 1914 it joined with the 22nd Regiment "The Oxford Rifles" to form A Company of the 1st Battalion, CEF.

Headquarters moved Wingham, Ontario, after World War I. In 1921 it was redesignated as the 9th (Grey's) Horse.

On 1 February 1936, the 9th Grey's Horse were disbanded along with 13 other regiments as part of the 1936 Canadian Militia Reorganization.

== Commanding officers ==
- Lieutenant-Colonel William Mahlon Davis (1857–1918) 1908–1910
- Lieutenant-Colonel Thomas Richard Mayberry (1854–1934) 1910–1918
- Lieutenant-Colonel F. Ross 1918–?
- Lieutenant-Colonel E. Pettigrew 1925–?

== Notable members ==
- Donald Matheson Sutherland, Minister of National Defence and former A Company Captain
- George Herbert Bowlby, medical officer and captain

== See also ==
- List of regiments of cavalry of the Canadian Militia (1900–1920)
