= 142nd Battalion (London's Own), CEF =

The 142nd (London's Own) Battalion, CEF was a unit in the Canadian Expeditionary Force during the First World War. Based in London, Ontario, the unit began recruiting in late 1915 in that city. After sailing to England in November 1916, the battalion was absorbed into the 23rd Reserve Battalion, CEF on November 11, 1916. The 142nd (London's Own) Battalion had one Officer Commanding: Lieutenant-Colonel C.M.R. Graham.

Stewart reports that the 142nd Battalion was organized on December 22, 1915, with a strength of 574 men. The unit was disbanded after the Great War on September 15, 1920. The 142nd Canadian Infantry Battalion was absorbed by the 23rd Reserve Battalion to provide reinforcements for the Canadian Corps in the field. The 142nd Battalion is affiliated with the 1st and 33rd CEF Battalions and is perpetuated by The Royal Canadian Regiment (RCR). The 142nd Battalion received the theatre of war honour The Great War, 1916.

Lieutenant George Van Wyck Laughton, M.C. (Vimy Ridge) of the 7th Regiment Fusiliers (Militia) attested to the 142nd Canadian Infantry Battalion in 1915. Details of the links between the Militia and the Canadian Expeditionary Force are provided on Lt. Laughton's web site.

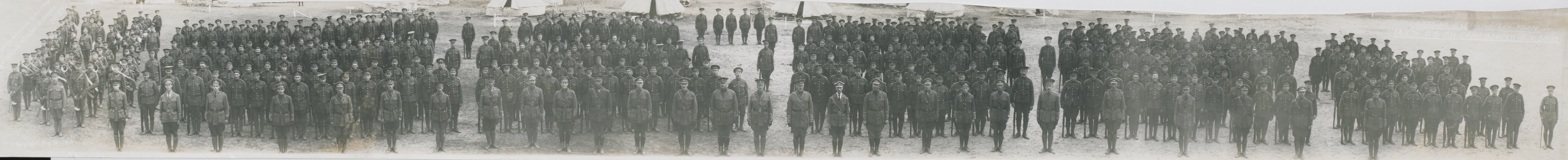
