= Frederick William Campbell =

Recipient of the Victoria Cross

Frederick William Campbell VC
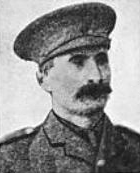
- Born: 15 June 1867; Wellington County, Ontario, Canada
- Died: 19 June 1915 (aged 48); Givenchy, France
- Burial place: Boulogne Eastern Cemetery
- Military career
- Allegiance: Canada
- Branch: Canadian Expeditionary Force
- Service years: 1885–1915
- Rank: Captain (posthumous)
- Units: 1st Canadian Battalion (Ontario Regiment), CEF
- Conflicts: Second Boer War; First World War: Western Front (DOW)
- Awards: Victoria Cross

Frederick William Campbell VC (15 June 1867 – 19 June 1915) was a Canadian Army Officer, and recipient of the Victoria Cross, the highest and most prestigious award for gallantry in the face of the enemy that can be awarded to British and Commonwealth forces.

== Biography ==
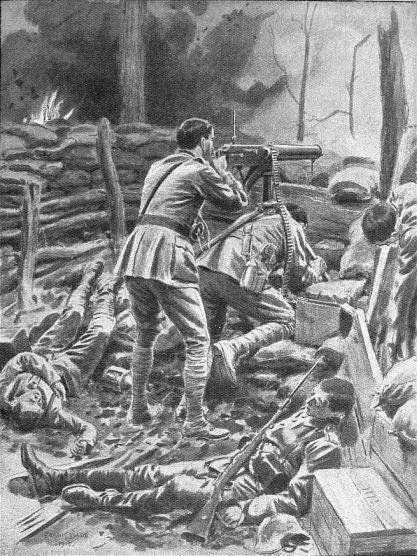
The action for which he received the Victoria Cross

Campbell was born on 15 June 1867 to Ephraim B. and Esther A. Hunt Campbell of Mount Forest, Ontario. He was married, to Margaret Annie.

As a lieutenant in the 1st (Western Ontario) Battalion, Canadian Expeditionary Force during the First World War, he was awarded the VC for actions performed on 15 June 1915 (his 48th birthday) at Givenchy, France.

For most conspicuous bravery on 15th June, 1915, during the action at Givenchy. Lt. Campbell took two machine-guns over the parapet, arrived at the German first line with one gun, and maintained his position there, under very heavy rifle, machine-gun and bomb fire, notwithstanding the fact that almost the whole of his detachment had then been killed or wounded. When our supply of bombs had become exhausted, this Officer advanced his gun still further to an exposed position, and, by firing about 1,000 rounds, succeeded in holding back the enemy's counter-attack. This very gallant Officer was subsequently wounded, and has since died.

— London Gazette, No. 29272, 20 August 1915

As he was retreating, his right thigh bone was shattered. The wound turned septic, and Campbell died in hospital in Boulogne four days later.

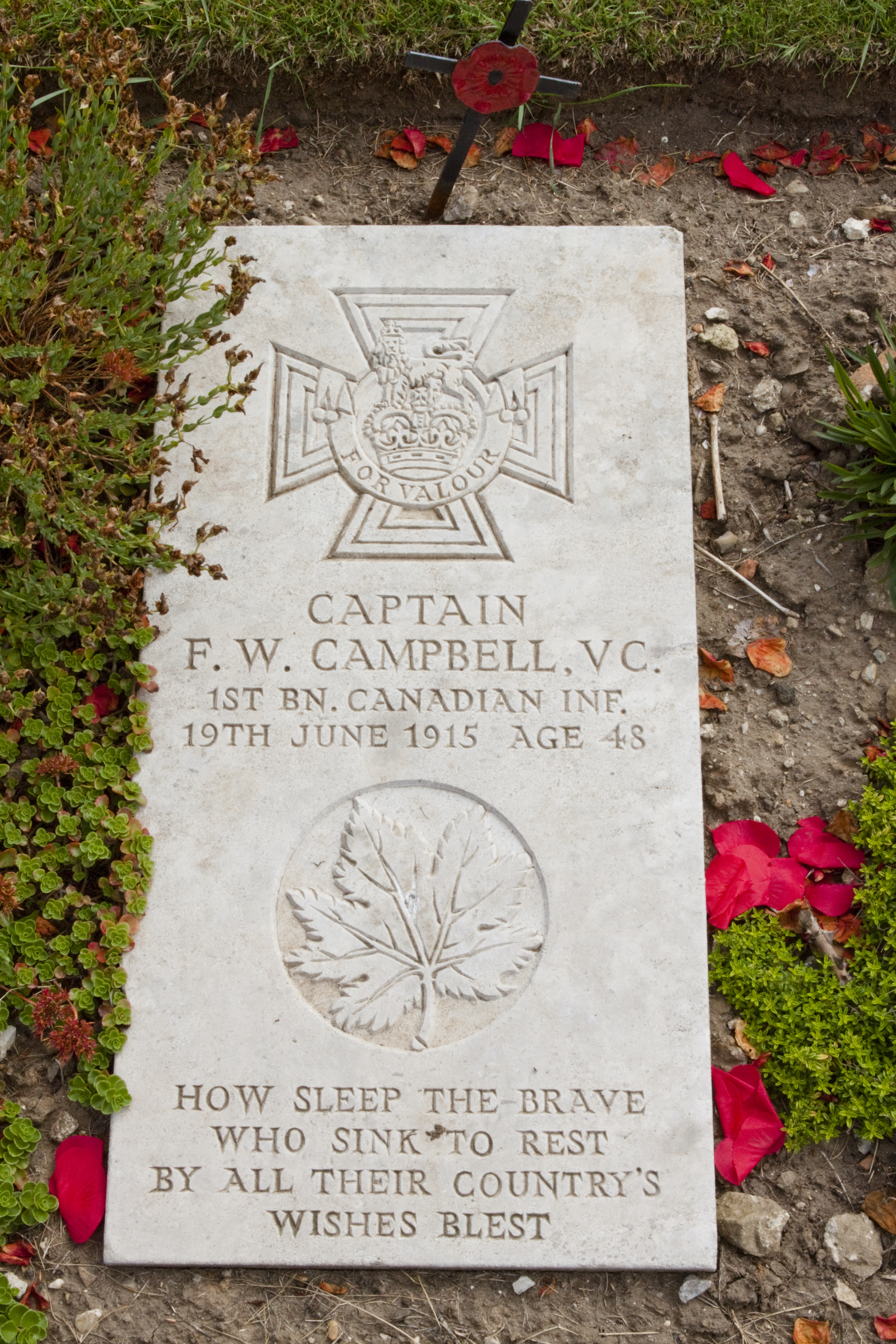
Campbell's CWGC gravestone

He is buried at Boulogne Eastern Cemetery, (Plot II, Row A, Grave 24). His gravestone inscription reads: HOW SLEEP THE BRAVE WHO SINK TO REST BY ALL THEIR COUNTRY'S WISHES BLEST. This inscription is from 'Ode Written in the Beginning of the Year 1746' by William Collins.
