= Royal Canadian Regiment =

Infantry regiment of the Canadian Army

The Royal Canadian Regiment
- Badge of the regiment
- Active: 21 December 1883 – present
- Country: Canada
- Branch: Canadian Army
- Type: Line Infantry
- Role: Mechanized infantry (two battalions); light role/paratroop (one battalion); light role/primary reserve (one battalion)
- Size: Four battalions
- Part of: Royal Canadian Infantry Corps
- Garrison/HQ: RHQ – Petawawa; 1st Battalion – Petawawa; 2nd Battalion – Gagetown; 3rd Battalion – Petawawa; 4th Battalion – London
- Nicknames: formally Royal Canadians, informally Junior Royals
- Motto: Pro patria (Latin for 'for country')
- March: Quick: "The Royal Canadian Regiment" (aka "St. Catharines"); Slow: "Pro Patria"
- Anniversaries: Paardeberg Day (Boer War) – 27 February; Hill 187 (Korea) – 03 May (3RCR); Soest Day (NATO) – 24 May (1RCR); Pachino Day (WW II) – 10 July; Pashmul Day (Afghanistan War) - 14 September; Kowang-san Day (Korean War) – 23 October; Mons Day (WW I) – 10 November; Regimental birthday – 21 December
- Engagements: Fenian Raids; North-West Rebellion; Second Boer War; First World War; Second World War; Korean War; War in Afghanistan
- Decorations: Commander-in-Chief Unit Commendation – 1st Battalion: Afghanistan, 2006.
- Battle honours: See #Battle honours

Commanders
- Colonel of the regiment: LGen (Ret'd) P.J. Devlin, CMM, MSC, CD
- Patrons: Judith Irving, Mike Holmes
- Notable commanders: William Dillon Otter

Insignia
- Tartan: Maple Leaf (2nd Bn pipes and drums)
- Abbreviation: RCR

The Royal Canadian Regiment (RCR) is an infantry regiment of the Canadian Army. The regiment consists of four battalions, three in the Regular Force and one in the primary reserve. The RCR is ranked first in the order of precedence amongst Canadian Army infantry regiments, but in a quirk of the rules of seniority, its 4th battalion is ninth.

The RCR was originally authorized as the Infantry School Corps on 21 December 1883, and established its first three company stations at Fredericton, New Brunswick; St Jean, Quebec; and Toronto, Ontario. In 1887 a fourth company was authorized and the next year was established at London, Ontario. Now consisting of three Regular Force battalions and one Reserve Force battalion, the regiment's four battalions are now stationed in Ontario and New Brunswick. With many of its soldiers drawn from Ontario and the Atlantic Provinces in recent decades, the regiment maintains a general connection as the "local" infantry regiment for anglophone eastern Canada.

The regiment is a "British-style" infantry regiment that is the spiritual home and repository of customs and traditions for a number of battalions that do not necessarily serve together operationally. The RCR maintains its Regimental Headquarters (RHQ) in Petawawa, Ontario, which has no operational command role but handles regimental affairs outside the responsibility of the individual battalions. The Royal Canadian Regiment Museum is located within historic Wolseley Hall in London, Ontario. Wolseley Barracks in London has been continuously occupied by some element of the regiment since construction of Wolseley Hall was completed in 1888. At various times Wolseley Barracks has been the home of the Regimental Headquarters, the 1st and 2nd Battalions, and remains the home of the 4th Battalion today.

== Battalions ==
NATO Map Symbols
1 RCR	2 CMBG
2 RCR	2 CMBG
3 RCR	3rd CLIR
4 RCR	31 CBG

Battalion	Home	Brigade	Notes
1st Battalion, The Royal Canadian Regiment	CFB Petawawa (Ontario)	2 Canadian Mechanized Brigade Group	Mechanized infantry
2nd Battalion, The Royal Canadian Regiment	CFB Gagetown (New Brunswick)	2 Canadian Mechanized Brigade Group	Mechanized infantry
3rd Battalion, The Royal Canadian Regiment	CFB Petawawa (Ontario)	3rd Canadian Light Infantry Regiment	Light infantry. Includes a parachute company.
4th Battalion, The Royal Canadian Regiment	Wolseley Barracks and Stratford Garrison (Ontario)	31 Canadian Brigade Group	Light infantry; Reserve

Regimental cypher.

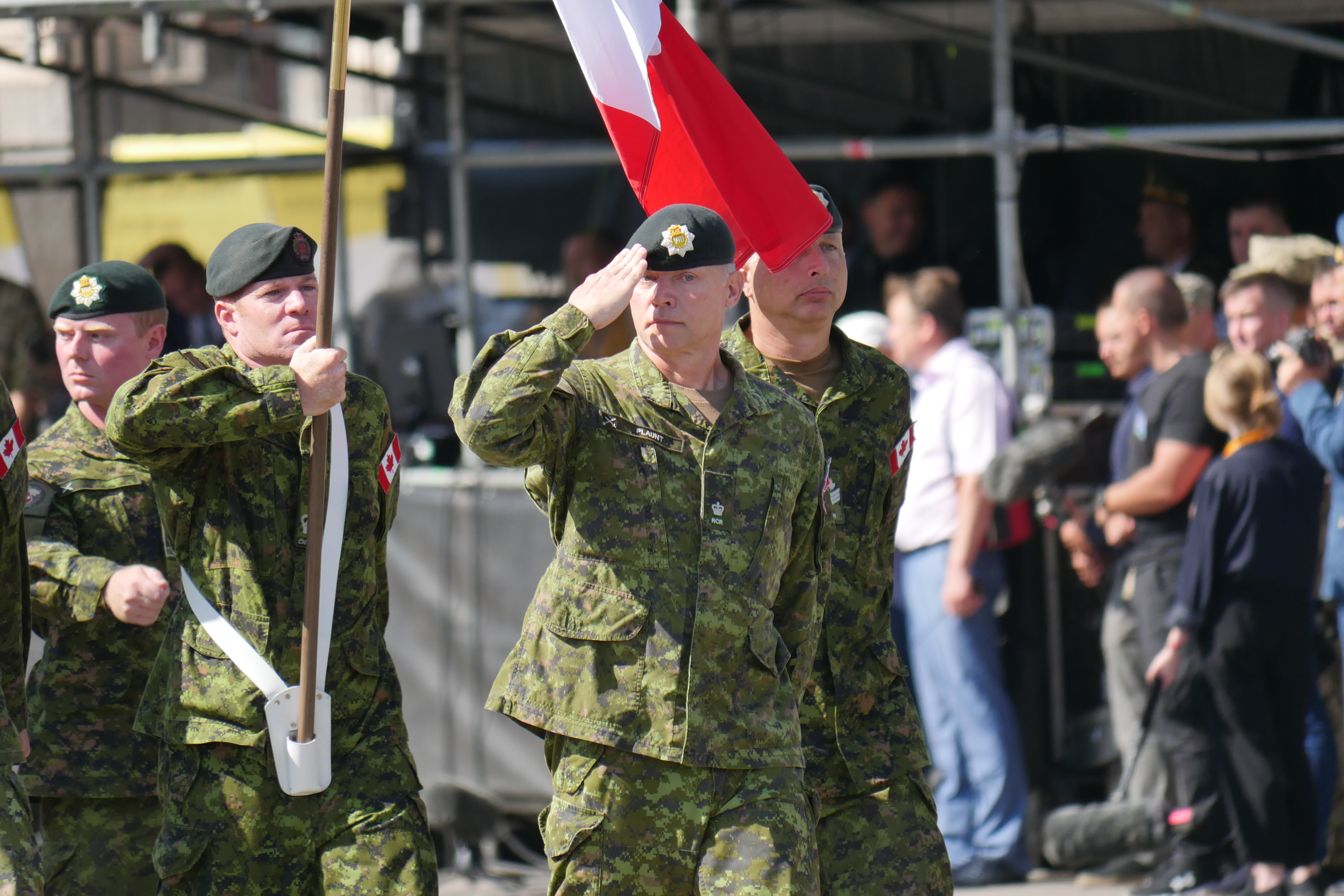
A major of the 3rd Battalion on parade in Kyiv, August 2018.

== Lineage ==
The regimental colour of 1st Battalion.

The camp flag.

=== Royal Canadian Regiment ===
- Originated 21 December 1883 as the Infantry School Corps
- Redesignated 14 May 1892 as the Canadian Regiment of Infantry
- Redesignated 24 May 1893 as the Royal Regiment of Canadian Infantry
- Redesignated 1 April 1899 as the Royal Canadian Regiment of Infantry
- Redesignated 1 November 1901 as The Royal Canadian Regiment
- Amalgamated 25 April 1958 with The London and Oxford Fusiliers (3rd Battalion, The Royal Canadian Regiment)' retaining its designation.
- The 3rd Battalion, The Royal Canadian Regiment (London and Oxford Fusiliers) redesignated in 1970 as the 4th Battalion, The Royal Canadian Regiment (London and Oxford Fusiliers)
- 4th Battalion, The Royal Canadian Regiment (London and Oxford Fusiliers) designated as the 4th Battalion, The Royal Canadian Regiment on 22 May 1990.

=== London and Oxford Fusiliers (3rd Battalion, The Royal Canadian Regiment) ===
- Originated 27 April 1866 in London, Ontario as the 7th Battalion Infantry, "Prince Arthur's Own"
- Redesignated 1 May 1866 as the 7th Battalion Infantry
- Redesignated 15 February 1867 as the 7th Battalion "London Light Infantry"
- Redesignated 16 January 1880 as the 7th Battalion "Fusiliers"
- Redesignated 8 May 1900 as the 7th Regiment "Fusiliers"
- Redesignated 29 March 1920 The Western Ontario Regiment
- Redesignated 1 August 1924 as The Canadian Fusiliers (City of London Regiment)
- Amalgamated 15 December 1936 with the Headquarters and A Company of the 2nd Machine Gun Battalion, CMGC and redesignated as The Canadian Fusiliers (City of London Regiment) (Machine Gun)
- Redesignated 29 January 1942 as the 2nd (Reserve) Battalion, The Canadian Fusiliers (City of London Regiment)
- Redesignated 24 March 1942 as the 2nd (Reserve) Battalion, The Canadian Fusiliers (City of London Regiment) (Machine Gun)
- Redesignated 1 April 1946 as The Canadian Fusiliers (City of London Regiment) (Machine Gun)
- Amalgamated 1 October 1954 with The Oxford Rifles and redesignated as the London and Oxford Fusiliers (3rd Battalion, The Royal Canadian Regiment)
- Amalgamated 25 April 1958 with The Royal Canadian Regiment and redesignated as the 3rd Battalion, The Royal Canadian Regiment (London and Oxford Fusiliers).

=== Oxford Rifles ===
- Originated 14 August 1863 in Woodstock, Ontario as the Twenty-second Battalion Volunteer Militia Rifles, Canada or The Oxford Rifles
- Redesignated 13 April 1866 as the 22nd Battalion The Oxford Rifles
- Redesignated 8 May 1900 as the 22nd Regiment The Oxford Rifles
- Redesignated 29 March 1920 as the Oxford Rifles
- Redesignated 18 March 1942 as the 2nd (Reserve) Battalion, The Oxford Rifles
- Redesignated 1 June 1945 as The Oxford Rifles
- Amalgamated 1 October 1954 with The Canadian Fusiliers (City of London Regiment) (Machine Gun) and redesignated as the London and Oxford Fusiliers (3rd Battalion, The Royal Canadian Regiment).

=== 2nd Machine Gun Battalion, CMGC ===
- Originated 1 June 1919 in London, Ontario as the 2nd Machine Gun Brigade, CMGC
- Redesignated 15 September 1924 as the 2nd Machine Gun Battalion, CMGC
- Amalgamated 15 December 1936 with The Canadian Fusiliers (City of London Regiment)

=== Lineage chart ===
Lineage chart, 1812–1914

1812	The Loyal London Volunteers	1st Regt of Middlesex Militia	1st Regt of Oxford Militia
1815	Disbanded	Disbanded	Disbanded
1856	Independent rifle and infy coys
1862	Independent arty, rifle and infy coys
1863	"Twenty-second Bn Volunteer Militia Rifles, Canada" or "The Oxford Rifles"
1866	22nd Bn "The Oxford Rifles"	7th Bn Infy, "Prince Arthur's Own"
1866	7th Bn Infy
1866	Active service in June	Active service in June
1867	7th Bn "London Light Infy"
1870	Active service (2 coys) in April
1880	7th Bn "Fusiliers"
1883	Infy School Corps
1885	Active service ("C" Coy) April–July	Active service April–July
1892	Canadian Regt of Infy
1893	The Royal Regt of Canadian Infy
1899	The Royal Canadian Regt of Infy	2nd (Special Service) Bn, Royal Canadian Regt of Infy
1900	Disbanded	3rd (Special Service) Bn, Royal Canadian Regt of Infy	22nd Regt "The Oxford Rifles"	7th Regt "Fusiliers"
1901	The Royal Canadian Regt
1902	Disbanded

Lineage chart, 1914–1936

The Royal Canadian Regt	22nd Regt "The Oxford Rifles"	7th Regt "Fusiliers"
1914	Active service	71st "Overseas" Infy Bn, CEF	1st Bn, CEF	33rd Bn, CEF
1915	168th "Overseas" Bn, CEF	142nd "Overseas" Bn, CEF
1916	Absorbed by 44th, 54th and 74th "Overseas" Bn	33rd Reserve Bn, CEF
1916	Absorbed by 36th "Overseas" Bn	Absorbed by 23rd Reserve Bn
1917	Absorbed by 4th and 6th Reserve Bns
1918	2nd Bn, CMGC, CEF
1919	The Royal Canadian Regt (Note: Permanent Active Militia component formed)	2nd MG Bde, CMGC
1920	Overseas component disbanded	1st Bn (71st Bn, CEF), The Oxford Rifles	2nd Bn (168th Bn, CEF), (Note: Reserve order of battle) The Oxford Rifles	Disbanded	1st Bn (1st Bn, CEF), The Western Ontario Regt	2nd Bn (33rd Bn, CEF), The Western Ontario Regt	3rd Bn (142nd Bn, CEF), The Western Ontario Regt	Disbanded
1924	1st Bn (1st Bn, CEF), The Canadian Fusiliers (City of London Regt)	2nd Bn (33rd Bn, CEF), The Canadian Fusiliers (City of London Regt)	3rd Bn (142nd Bn, CEF), The Canadian Fusiliers (City of London Regt)	2nd MG Bn, CMGC
1936	Disbanded	Disbanded	Disbanded
1936	The Oxford Rifles	The Canadian Fusiliers (City of London Regt) (MG)

Lineage chart, 1936–present

The Royal Canadian Regt	The Oxford Rifles	The Canadian Fusiliers (City of London Regt) (MG)
1939	The Royal Canadian Regt, CASF
1942	1st Bn, The Canadian Fusiliers (City of London Regt), CASF	2nd (Reserve) Bn, The Canadian Fusiliers (City of London Regt)
1942	1st Bn, The Oxford Rifles, CASF	2nd (Reserve) Bn, The Oxford Rifles	2nd (Reserve) Bn, The Canadian Fusiliers (City of London Regt) (MG)
1944	2nd Canadian Infy Training Bn, Type A (Canadian Fusiliers), CASF
1945	1st Canadian Infy Bn (The Royal Canadian Regt), CASF	Disbanded	The Oxford Rifles	Disbanded
1945	2nd Bn The Royal Canadian Regt, CIC
1946	The Royal Canadian Regt, CIC	Disbanded	The Canadian Fusiliers (City of London Regt) (MG)
1950	The Royal Canadian Regt (1st Bn) RCIC	2nd Bn, The Royal Canadian Regt, RCIC	3rd Bn, The Royal Canadian Regt, RCIC
1952	1st Bn, The Royal Canadian Regt, RCIC	2nd Bn, The Royal Canadian Regt
1953	1st Bn, The Royal Canadian Regt
1954	Disbanded	The London and Oxford Fusiliers (3rd Bn, The Royal Canadian Regt)
1958	3rd Bn, The Royal Canadian Regt (London and Oxford Fusiliers)
1970	3rd Bn, The Royal Canadian Regt	4th Bn, The Royal Canadian Regt (London and Oxford Fusiliers)
1990	4th Bn, The Royal Canadian Regt
2012	Perpetuates War of 1812 units	Perpetuates War of 1812 units	Perpetuates War of 1812 units	Perpetuates War of 1812 units

== Perpetuations ==
=== War of 1812 ===
- The Loyal London Volunteers
- 1st Regiment of Middlesex Militia
- 1st Regiment of Oxford Militia

=== Great War ===
- 1st Battalion (Ontario Regiment), CEF
- 33rd Battalion, CEF
- 71st Battalion, CEF
- 142nd Battalion (London's Own), CEF
- 168th Battalion (Oxfords), CEF
- 2nd Battalion, Canadian Machine Gun Corps, CEF

== Alliances ==
- United Kingdom – The Royal Regiment of Fusiliers
- United Kingdom – The Rifles
- Jamaica – The Jamaica Regiment

== Battle honours ==
The Royal Canadian Regiment has been awarded a total of 61 battle honours. In the list below, battle honours in capitals were awarded for participation in large operations and campaigns, while those in lowercase indicate honours granted for more specific battles. Battle honours in bold type are emblazoned on the regimental colours.

Regimental colour of 1st Battalion

=== War of 1812 ===
- Defence of Canada – 1812–1815 – Défense du Canada
- Detroit
- Niagara
- Non-emblazonable honorary distinction Defence of Canada – 1812–1815 – Défense du Canada

=== North West Rebellion ===
- **Saskatchewan**
- **North West Canada, 1885**

=== South African War ===
- **Paardeberg**
- **South Africa, 1899–1900**

=== Great War ===
- **Ypres, 1915, '17**
- Gravenstafel
- St. Julien
- Festubert, 1915
- **Mount Sorrel**
- **Somme, 1916**
- Pozières
- Flers–Courcelette
- **Ancre Heights**
- Arras, 1917, '18
- **Vimy, 1917**
- Arleux
- Scarpe, 1917, '18
- **Hill 70**
- **Passchendaele**
- **Amiens**
- Drocourt–Quéant
- **Hindenburg Line**
- Canal du Nord
- Cambrai, 1918
- **Pursuit to Mons**
- France and Flanders, 1915–18

=== Second World War ===
- **Landing in Sicily**
- Valguarnera
- Agira
- Adrano
- Regalbuto
- Sicily, 1943
- Landing at Reggio
- **Motta Montecorvino**
- Campobasso
- Torella
- **San Leonardo**
- The Gully
- **Ortona**
- Cassino II
- Gustav Line
- Liri Valley
- **Hitler Line**
- **Gothic Line**
- **Lamone Crossing**
- Misano Ridge
- **Rimini Line**
- San Martino–San Lorenzo
- Pisciatello
- Fosso Vecchio
- **Italy, 1943–1945**
- Apeldoorn
- **North-West Europe, 1945**

=== Korean War ===
- **Korea, 1951–1953**

=== Afghanistan ===
- Afghanistan

== History ==
=== Early history ===
The Royal Canadian Regiment is one of Canada's oldest Regular Force military units. In 2012 the regiment was assigned the perpetuation of the 1st Regiment of Middlesex Militia (1812–15) and the 1st Regiment of Oxford Militia (1812–15) from the War of 1812, and as a result carries three battle honours from that conflict. The RCR was also assigned the perpetuation of The Loyal London Volunteers which was accompanied by a non-emblazonable Honorary Distinction.

The regiment itself was formed as the Infantry School Corps on 21 December 1883, authorized by a Militia Act which also created the Cavalry School Corps. These school corps were created as regular units that would train the Canadian militia. The first companies stood up in Fredericton NB, St Jean-sur-Richelieu QC, and Toronto ON in 1883, with a fourth company standing up in London ON several years later.

The Infantry School Corps' first battle honours were earned during the North-West Rebellion in 1885, where it fought at Batoche and Cut Knife Creek. The regiment later provided personnel to the Yukon Field Force (1898–1900), which assisted the North-West Mounted Police in the Yukon during the Gold Rush. The regiment served in the South African (Boer) War (1899–1903). Its Great War deployment was delayed by a garrison assignment in Bermuda from September 1914 until August 1915. Upon returning to Nova Scotia, its members attested for overseas service with the Canadian Expeditionary Force (CEF), arriving in France in October 1915 to fight in WW1.

=== South African War ===
The regiment's name was changed to The Royal Canadian Regiment of Infantry in 1893, with a new emphasis on being combat capable. William Dillon Otter, formerly of The Queen's Own Rifles of Canada, was the first commanding officer. He would later become the first Canadian-born chief of the General Staff, the head of the Canadian Army.

During the South African War (Second Boer War), the "2nd (Special Service) Battalion" was raised from across the country to contribute Canada's First Contingent in this war, with Otter in command. This battalion was quickly disbanded in 1900 upon its return to Canada, even though they were considered by many British officers to be the best infantry battalion in the country. The "3rd (Special Service) Battalion" was also raised at this time, in 1900, and was employed as a garrison force in Halifax until 1902 when it was also disbanded.

In the Boer War, the Toronto company of the 2RCRI fought Canada's first overseas battle at Sunnyside, Cape Colony, on January 1, 1900, defeating a Boer commando in an action led by Australia's Queensland Mounted Infantry. The unit as a whole then joined and played an instrumental role in the victory at the Battle of Paardeberg Drift (18–27 February 1900), including an advance by night towards the enemy lines, quietly digging trenches on high ground 65 yards from the Boer lines. On February 27, 1900, the Boers, staring into the muzzles of Canadian and British rifles, surrendered, thus removing the commando blocking the way to the first Boer capital, Bloemfontein, Orange Free State. This date has since been celebrated by the Regiment as Paardeberg Day. Having delivered the first unqualified good news of the war for the British Empire, the Regiment also distinguished itself on the march north, arriving first at the gates of Pretoria.

During the South African War Private Richard Rowland Thompson was awarded a Queen's scarf, one of the four presented to soldiers of the Dominions, a further four scarves crocheted by Queen Victoria went to non-commissioned officers of the British Army.

A small statuette (1999) by André Gauthier (sculptor) commemorates the centennial of the Royal Canadian Regiment's Battle of Paardeberg during the Boer War.

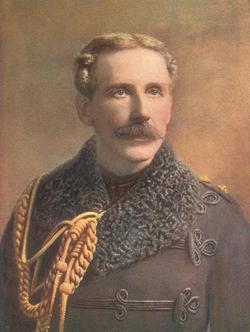
Lieutenant-Colonel William Dillon Otter

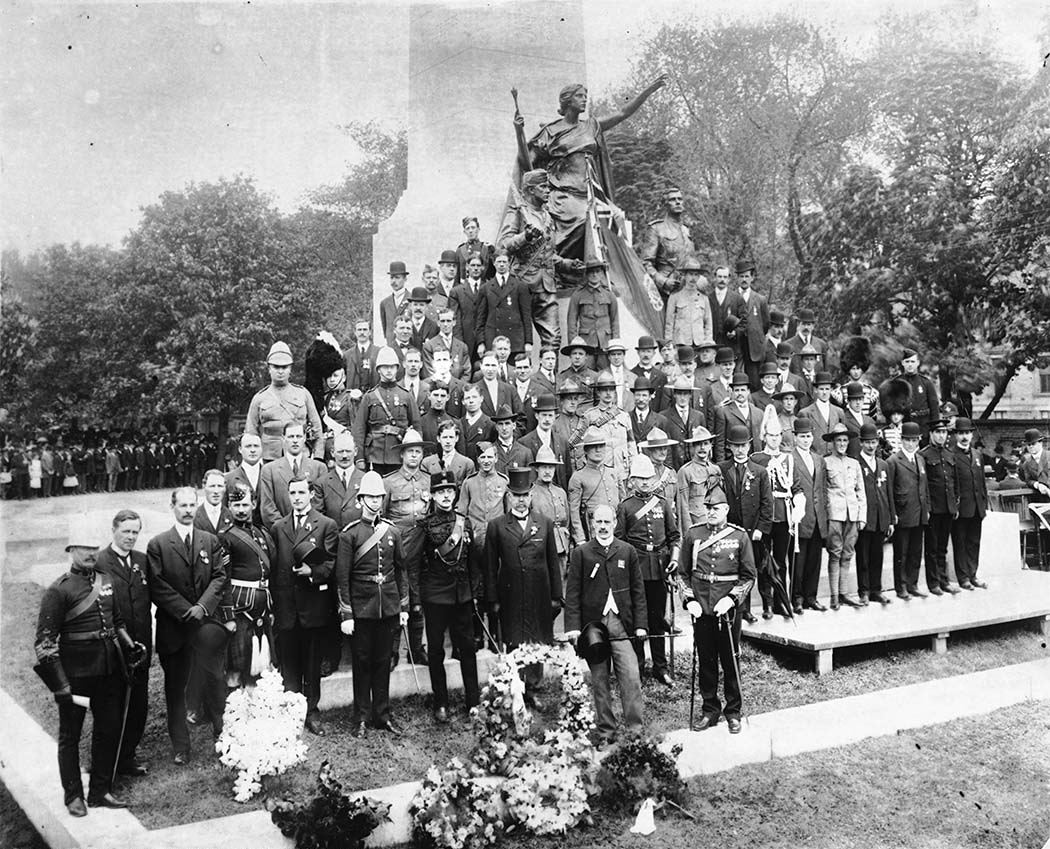
The unveiling of the South African War Memorial in Toronto in 1908

=== End of the Victorian era and the Great War; 1900–1919 ===
In October 1901 the regiment received new colours from the Duke of Cornwall and York (later King George V) during his visit to Canada, and the regiment's name was changed to The Royal Canadian Regiment. In 1914, the regiment was deployed to the Imperial fortress colony of Bermuda for garrison duties, replacing the 2nd Battalion, Lincolnshire Regiment, from September 1914 (arriving at Bermuda on 3 September 1914, aboard HMCS Canada, escorted by HMCS Niobe) to August 1915, when it was replaced by the 38th Battalion (Ottawa), CEF and returned to Halifax and reattested for overseas service. The RCR arrived in France in October 1915 to join the new 3rd Canadian Division. The regiment combined with Princess Patricia's Canadian Light Infantry and the 42nd and 49th Canadian Infantry Battalions to form the 7th Canadian Infantry Brigade. Battle honours awarded to The Royal Canadian Regiment for its actions in the First World War included: "Mount Sorrel, Somme, 1916, Flers-Courcelette, Ancre Heights, Arras, 1917, 18, Vimy, 1917, Hill 70, Ypres, 1917, Passchendaele, Amiens, Scarpe, 1918, Hindenburg Line, Canal du Nord, Pursuit to Mons, FRANCE AND FLANDERS, 1914–18".

Among the honours and awards to members of the regiment in the First World War was the Victoria Cross (VC) won by Lieutenant Milton Gregg. The RCR also recognizes the VC won by Lieutenant Frederick William Campbell, who was an officer of the 1st (Western Ontario) Battalion of the Canadian Expeditionary Force, one of the battalions now perpetuated by The RCR.

=== Inter-war years; 1919–1939 ===
The RCR remained a Permanent Force regiment between the wars and returned to its role of providing instruction to the Militia through garrisons in London (Ontario), Halifax (Nova Scotia), Toronto (Ontario) and Montreal (Quebec).

=== Second World War; 1939–1945 ===
On 1 September 1939 the regiment was mobilized as part of the Canadian Active Service Force as Canada prepared for participation in the Second World War. When war was declared on September 10, the RCR had already been allocated to the 1st Canadian Infantry Brigade, a formation made up entirely of Ontario units. Moving to the United Kingdom in December 1939 as a component of the 1st Canadian Infantry Division, the RCR saw hard training for almost four years.

On 10 July 1943, the RCR landed at Pachino in the opening waves of the Allied invasion of Sicily – the last member of the regiment to participate in these original waves – George F. Burrows of Chatham Ontario – died on April 11, 2012, in Windsor, Ontario at the age of 88. The regiment and its sister units in the 1st Brigade, The Hastings and Prince Edward Regiment and the 48th Highlanders of Canada fought in several battles as the division advanced north and then east towards Messina. After the 38-day campaign on the island was completed, the regiment was involved in another amphibious landing (codenamed Operation Baytown) at Reggio di Calabria, as part of Allied invasion of the Italian mainland in September.

The RCR fought in several battles of the Italian campaign, including key engagements in the Moro River valley near Ortona in December 1943. During 1944, the regiment took part the Battle of Monte Cassino in attacks on German defensive lines called the Hitler Line and later the Gothic Line.

The regiment was transferred to northwest Europe in February 1945 during Operation Goldflake and took part in the liberation the Dutch city of Apeldoorn. The regiment received 28 battle honours for its participation in the Second World War. The regiment returned home to Canada in 1945.

=== Post-war period and the Korean War; 1945–1953 ===
In 1950 the regiment was called upon to contribute to Canada's forces for the Korean War. A new Active Service Force (Special Force) was to be raised, and the regiment expanded to a two-battalion, then a three-battalion, organization. The 2nd Battalion, followed by the 1st and 3rd Battalions, each saw service in Korea. The 2nd Battalion helped stabilize the 38th parallel, most notably at the Chail-li sector. In October 1952, the 1st Battalion fought the Chinese at the battle of Kowang-san (Hill 355 – Little Gibraltar). It was replaced by the 3rd Battalion, which took over the Jamestown Line on Hill 187, where it fought one of the last engagements before the armistice in 1953. After the end of the Korean War, the regiment was reduced to two battalions, when the 3rd Battalion was disbanded in July 1954.

=== Cold War; 1953–1992 ===
In 1954 two London, Ontario, Militia regiments, the Canadian Fusiliers (City of London Regiment) (MG) and The Oxford Rifles were amalgamated and redesignated The London and Oxford Fusiliers (3rd Battalion, The Royal Canadian Regiment). This unit thus became the Reserve component of The RCR. In 1958, it was renamed 3rd Battalion, The Royal Canadian Regiment (London and Oxford Fusiliers).

In 1989, the designation of the Reserve battalion was shortened to 4th Battalion, The Royal Canadian Regiment. This amalgamation also brought to the regiment the perpetuation of a number of battalions of the First World War Canadian Expeditionary Force, including the 1st, 33rd, 71st, 142nd and 168th Battalions as well as the 2nd Battalion of the Canadian Machine Gun Corps. The amalgamation also saw the total battle honours for the First World War, based on the combined list of amalgamated components of the regiment, increase to the full list seen below.

The Militia battalion (3rd Battalion) was renumbered as the 4th Battalion in 1970 when the Canadian Guards were reduced to nil strength and the soldiers of that regiment's 2nd Battalion (at CFB Petawawa) became the restored 3rd Battalion, The RCR, on the Regular Force order of battle. At the same time, the 2nd Battalion of The RCR was relocated to CFB Gagetown, New Brunswick, and reconstituted from the soldiers of the Black Watch (Royal Highland Regiment) of Canada as its two battalions there were also reduced to nil strength and removed from the active regiments in the army's Regular Force order of battle.

During the 1950s and 1960s, battalions of The RCR were stationed as part of 4 Canadian Mechanized Brigade Group at Fort York, Germany. These deployments were executed by 1RCR (1955–57 and 1962–65) and 2RCR (1953–55 and 1965–70). 3rd Battalion was later deployed to Germany, stationed in Baden-Söllingen 1977–84 and 1988–93.

All three Regular Force battalions of The RCR were deployed during the October Crisis in 1970 as part of the government's response to the FLQ. Major John Hasek became the first commander of the Skyhawks Parachute Team when it formed in 1971. The three Regular Force battalions were also deployed in to support the 1976 Summer Olympics in Montreal, Quebec.

Throughout the Cold War period, The RCR participated in Canada's contributions to United Nations peacekeeping. For battalions of the regiment, this meant rotating tours on the island of Cyprus. The six-month tours of this mission, named Operation Snowgoose, were executed by elements of the regiment 13 times between 1966 and 1992.

In 1977 the 3rd Battalion was posted to CFB Baden-Soellingen in Germany.

In 1983, a Century of Service plaque at the Royal Military College Saint-Jean commemorates the centennial of the Royal Canadian Regiment, 1883–1983 Canada's oldest permanent force infantry regiment. Elements of the regiment garrisoned at Saint John sur Richelieu from 1884 to 1908 and 1924–.

In 1984 the battalion was rotated to Winnipeg. In 1988 the battalion was rotated back to Baden until the base was closed in 1993 at which time it was disbanded in Germany and subsequently stood up at CFB Borden, Ontario, as a "10/90" battalion. The "10/90" concept created an infantry battalion in each Regular Force regiment with approximately 10 per cent of its personnel being full-time Regular soldiers, while the remaining positions were filled by Reserve Force soldiers from affiliated units in the region. These units existed until 1996 when the three 10/90 battalions were stood down and replaced by light infantry battalions on the Regular Force order of battle. Initially formed without specific regimental affiliation, within the year the light infantry battalion was relocated to CFB Petawawa and officially designated the 3rd Battalion, The RCR.

In 1990, HQ and Duke of Edinburgh's Company (the first rifle company) of the 1st Battalion deployed to Cornwall, Ontario, as part of Operation Kahnawake. The 2nd Battalion, as part of 5 Canadian Mechanized Brigade Group, deployed to the Montreal region to partake in Operation Salon. These deployments were part of the government's response to the Oka Crisis.

In 1991, M Company and a platoon from P Company from 3rd Battalion (CFB Baden-Soellingen, Germany) and C Company from 1RCR (CFB London, Ontario) served in the Persian Gulf during Operations Desert Shield and Desert Storm, the first Gulf War. These companies were employed on airfield and field hospital security duties.

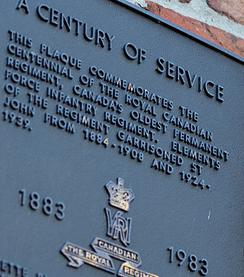
Century of Service Plaque The Royal Canadian Regiment 1883–1983, Royal Military College Saint-Jean

=== Peacekeeping era; 1992–2004 ===
In 1992, soldiers from the English-speaking N Company of the 3rd Battalion (Major Devlin), based in Canadian Forces Base (CFB) Baden-Soellingen in Germany, as an attachment to the French-speaking Royal 22^{e} Régiment, operationally secured the Sarajevo airport during the Yugoslav wars. This operation saw a redeployment of the entire battle group from Croatia to Sarajevo, under the command of General Lewis MacKenzie.

Elizabeth II, Queen of Canada, made mention of this operational force and its commitment to international peace while she was in the National Capital Region that same year during Canada's 125th, stating:

I am delighted to be here with you once again, to share in this day of national celebration, and, as a member of the Canadian family, to wish Canada a happy birthday on this one hundred and twenty-fifth anniversary of Confederation. We have an occasion, and a country, worth celebrating ... I want to say a special word about the brave Canadian soldiers who today seek to bring peace, under the United Nations auspices, to a dangerous situation in Bosnia. They serve both Canada and the cause of peace with courage and conviction. As Queen of Canada, I salute their contribution with pride ... You have inherited a country uniquely worth preserving. I call on you all, wherever you live, whatever your walk of life, to cherish that inheritance, and to protect it with all your strength. May God bless each and every one of you as you go about that task. And may God bless Canada.

— Queen Elizabeth II, Queen of Canada, on the 125th anniversary of Confederation, July 1, 1992

Shortly thereafter the Governor General of Canada bestowed the Commander-in-Chief Unit Commendation to N Company. The official warrant stated:

... The first was to the 1st Battalion of the Royal 22^{e} Regiment Battle Group (Including N Company, 3rd Battalion Royal Canadian Regiment) for having opened the airport in the besieged city of Sarajevo in July 1992 (OP HARMONY). The Commendation was officially presented to the unit by Her Excellency, the Right Honourable Adrienne Clarkson, CC, CMM, COM, CD, Governor General of Canada and Commander-in-Chief of the Canadian Forces during a ceremony which took place at the Citadel in Quebec City on 9 September 2002 ...".

The unit returned to Bosnia for a tour with the Stabilization Force, SFOR, in 1998 and 1999.

All three Regular Force battalions served as peacekeepers in the Sinai Peninsula, in Bosnia. The 1st Battalion served in Kosovo under NATO mission Operation Kinetic, Rotation 1, December 1999–May 2000.

In 2000, the 2nd Battalion had the honour of mounting the Queen's Guard at Buckingham Palace, when a detachment came to London to commemorate the Canadian involvement in the Second Boer War, and to celebrate the re-opening of Canada House. Later that year, H Company Group of 2nd Battalion deployed to eastern Africa as part of UNMEE.

As the United States prepared to launch military actions against Iraq, 2 RCR formed a provisional battle group and was warned off that if the government decided to participate, it would deploy. The government decided against participation and instead decided to return to Afghanistan. I Company Group deployed to Kabul on 26 May 2003 to form the Defence and Security Company for the construction of the Canadian camp. It returned to Canada in August of that year after 3rd Battalion Group took on ISAF operations.

The "Leadership Award" (2000) by André Gauthier (sculptor) was commissioned for The Royal Canadian Regiment.

In March 2004 the same company deployed to Port-au-Prince, Haiti, as part of Operation Halo (Operation "Secure Tomorrow" as the United States called it) to conduct security operations as part of the Multinational Interim Force. This force was set in place in order to set the conditions for the United Nations to take over. I Company conducted a relief in place with H Company Group in June. H Company changed roles to the UN force and redeployed to Gonaïves, Haiti. It returned to Canada in September of that year.

=== Afghanistan; 2003–present ===
In August 2003, the 3rd Battalion deployed to Kabul Afghanistan as part of Operation Athena for a six-month tour of duty. The battalion suffered the first Canadian casualties effected by enemy action in the war and conducted the first Canadian company-level direct action raid against insurgent forces since the Korean War.

In August 2006, the 1st Battalion deployed to Afghanistan as part of Operation Athena, replacing the 1st Battalion, Princess Patricia's Canadian Light Infantry (PPCLI) for a six-month tour of duty in theatre.

In February 2007, the 2nd Battalion replaced the 1st Battalion in Afghanistan for a tour of duty.

In September 2008, 3rd Battalion replaced 2nd Battalion, PPCLI, as part of Operation Athena, Roto 6, forming the core of the Task Force Kanadahar Battle Group. It served until relieved in place by 2nd Battalion, Royal 22^{e} Régiment in April 2009. The predeployment training of a platoon from the battalion was filmed for the reality television series Combat School.

In April 2010, the 1st Battalion deployed for Task Force 1–10

In February 2012, the 2nd Battalion formed the core of Rotation 1 of the Canadian Contribution Training Mission – Afghanistan and deployed to Kabul on Operation Attention till November 2012.

In October–November 2018, an 82-strong contingent from all four battalions and 38 members of the Royal Canadian Artillery Band provided the Queen's Guard at Buckingham Palace, St James's Palace and the Tower of London, as well as Windsor Castle.

The RCR has contributed personnel to Canadian Forces Joint Task Force-Ukraine since 2014.

== Recognition ==
Freedom of the City was exercised by the Royal Canadian Regiment in Fredericton, New Brunswick on 2 June 1973 and in St. John's, Newfoundland and Labrador on June 19, 2005.

On 10 November 1983 Canada Post issued 'The Royal Canadian Regiment, The British Columbia Regiment' as part of the Canadian Forces, Regiments, 1883–1983 series. The stamps were designed by Ralph Tibbles, based on a painting by William Southern. The 32¢ stamps are perforated 13.5 × 13 and were printed by Canadian Bank Note Company, Limited.

== Honorary appointments ==
=== Colonel-in-chief ===
Prince Philip, Duke of Edinburgh, was appointed as the colonel-in-chief of the RCR on 8 December 1953 and held the appointment until his death in 2021. Prince Philip had only one predecessor in this appointment: Prince Arthur, Duke of Connaught and Strathearn, from 1929 to 1942.

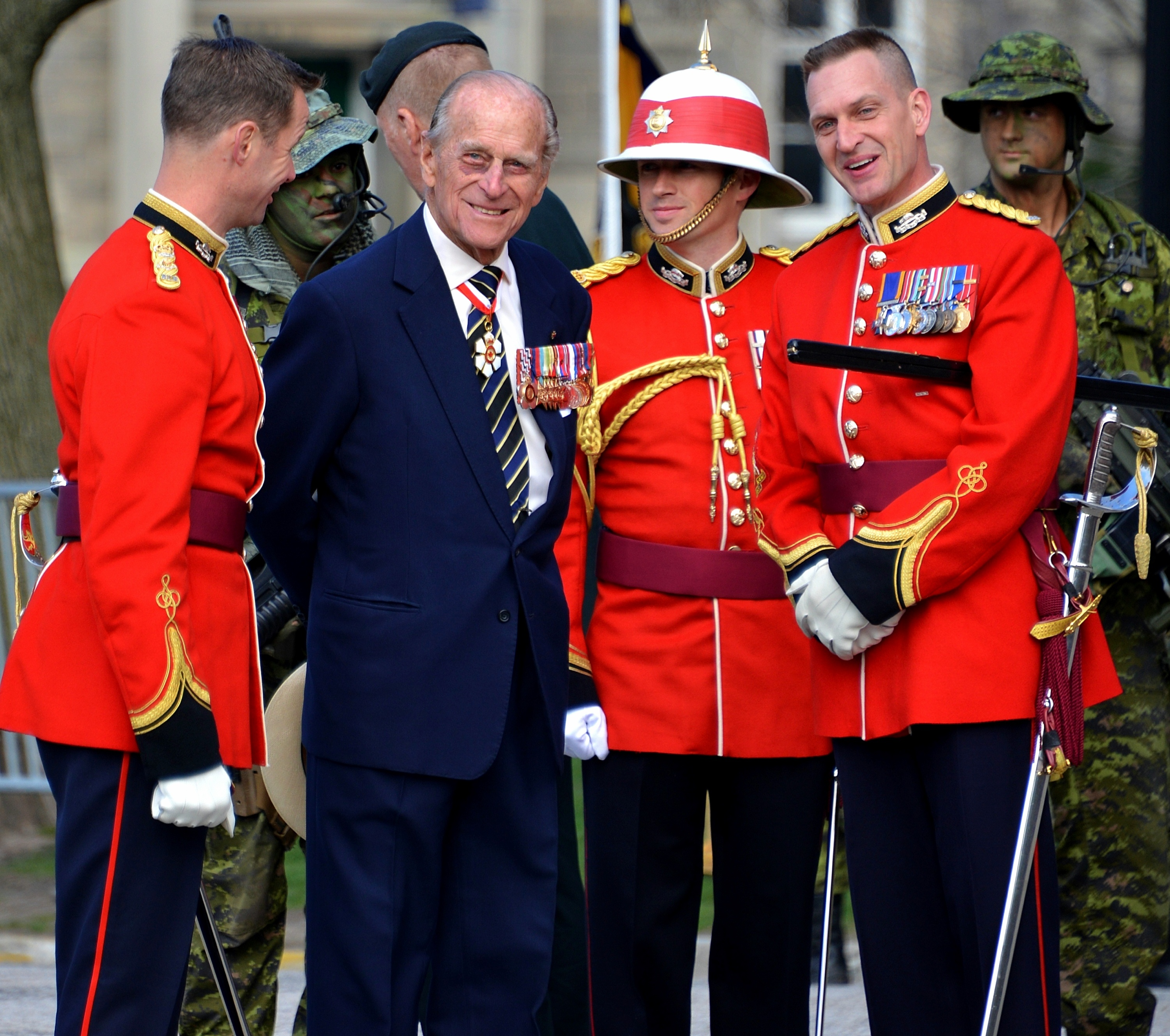
Prince Philip as Colonel-in-Chief in April 2013.

=== Colonel of the regiment ===
The colonel of the regiment, through such appointment, holds the pre-eminent position in the conduct of regimental affairs. He is the senior member of the Regimental Council, an advisor to The RCR Association Board of Directors and The RCR Trust Fund. The Colonel of the Regiment is former Governor General of Canada David Johnston, who accepted the appointment on August 4, 2018.

=== Honorary lieutenant-colonel, 4th Battalion, The Royal Canadian Regiment ===
The honorary lieutenant-colonel, through such appointment, is specifically an adviser and mentor to the 4th Battalion, as the Colonel of the Regiment is to the Regiment as a whole. The Honorary Lieutenant Colonel is a member of The RCR Senate and acts as an adviser to The RCR Association Board of Directors and The RCR Trust Fund. The current honorary lieutenant-colonel (HLCol) of the 4th Battalion is Colonel Bruce W. Burnham, of Ilderton, Ontario.

=== Patron ===
On 5 June 2012, Judith Irving was officially appointed first patron of the Regiment.

In December 2013, Mike Holmes was officially appointed a patron of the Regiment.

=== Regimental Sculptor ===
On 26 June 2013, Christian Cardell Corbet was officially appointed the first Regimental Sculptor. This took place at Canada House, London, UK where Corbet was presented with a regimental tie following the unveiling of his portrait bust of the Colonel in Chief of The Regiment, The Prince Philip, Duke of Edinburgh, KG, KT.

== RCR cap badge ==
"An eight-pointed diamond cut star; upon the star a raised circle surmounted by the crown; within the raised circle, the block letters "VRI", the Imperial Cypher of Queen Victoria." (Description of the badge of The RCR as presented in Regiments and Corps of the Canadian Army, published by the Army Historical Section, 1964)

The letters VRI on the cap badge of The RCR stand for Victoria Regina Imperatrix, which is Latin for "Victoria, Queen and Empress". The right to wear the imperial cypher and crown was granted to the regiment by Queen Victoria in 1893.

When a royal or imperial cypher forms part of the badge of a regiment it is normal for it to change with each succeeding sovereign. During the period 1901 to 1919, the officially authorized versions of the regiment's cap badge were those with Edward VII's and George V's cyphers, although the regiment continued to use the "VRI" ensigned badges throughout this time while petitioning for their formal return. In 1919, George V granted The Royal Canadian Regiment permission to wear "VRI" in perpetuity – a unique privilege.

== Company designations ==
The companies of the battalions of The RCR are lettered sequentially across the regiment:

- 1st Battalion – A to F
- 2nd Battalion – G to L
- 3rd Battalion – M to R
- 4th Battalion – S, T and X (S Company consists of a company headquarters as well as two rifle platoons in London, Ontario, and 3 Platoon in Stratford, Ontario. T Company consists of a company headquarters in Stratford, Ontario, and X Company consists of the battalion headquarters personnel.)

In the Regular Force battalions, the first four companies are rifle companies, and the latter two are combat support (weapons) and administration company (combat service support).

When on parade, companies parade in alphabetic order. Companies are normally addressed by the NATO phonetic alphabet for their designation letter with the following exceptions:

- A Coy, 1RCR, is designated and always referred to as "Duke of Edinburgh's Company" or, colloquially, "Duke's Company"
- C Coy, 1RCR, is known as "Charles" Company. This unique designation was adopted during the Korean War, as the company was noted for maintaining a very high standard of dress and deportment.
- M Coy, 3RCR, is often referred to as "Para" Company, short for Parachute Company, at the discretion of the commanding officer, although this title is not officially recognized by the regiment as other than a colloquial nickname, even as the 3rd Battalion is now airborne-capable

== Regimental bands ==
=== Bugles and Drums ===
The first band of The RCR was formed under "A" Company of the Infantry School Corps in 1894, when Sergeant Charles Hayes, a graduate of Kneller Hall Music College, enlisted in January 1894. That same year the corps also reported training nine buglers for the Militia.

By 1899, the authorized establishment for the regiment included four "Sergt. Trumpeters or Drummers" on the staff of the Regimental Depots along with 16 "Trumpeters, Buglers or Drummers" between the stations of the regiment. By 1901, the authorized establishment had changed to one "Sergt. Trumpeters or Drummers" and 12 "Trumpeters, Buglers or Drummers", possibly indicating a consolidation of musicians into a regimental band rather than a training cadre at each garrison.

The regiment reported having an active band throughout much of the First World War, once their instruments were smuggled forward for them to use. With few lapses, the regiment maintained a Drum and Bugle band at least until the 1990s, when the 1st Battalion had a Drum and Bugle Corps within the ranks of C Company.

=== Pipes and Drums ===
In 1970, following a review of the regular army, a number of infantry battalions were disbanded. The Canadian Guards and the Black Watch (Royal Highland Regiment) of Canada lost both of their regular battalions, with personnel being distributed to The Royal Canadian Regiment. The 2nd Battalion, Royal Canadian Regiment adopted the Pipes and Drums of the Black Watch, becoming the Pipes and Drums of the 2nd Battalion, The Royal Canadian Regiment. The 3rd Battalion of The RCR, similarly, adopted the Pipes and Drums of the 2nd Battalion, The Canadian Guards, when they were disbanded. In 1977 the 3rd Battalion Pipes and Drums were redesignated the Special Service Force Pipes and Drums.

The 2nd Battalion The Royal Canadian Regiment currently maintains the only Pipes and Drums in the Canadian regular army. Regimental pipers wear a distinctive cap badge in their glengarry or feather bonnet. This is the regimental cap badge on a circular belt on which the Regiment's name is inscribed. This follows the practice of the Canadian Guards pipers' cap badge. In the 2000s, the Pipe Band began wearing an embroidered piper's badge with their feather bonnets.

=== RCR Band ===
The members of the regiment who form the Drum and Bugles and Pipes and Drums bands are trained infantry soldiers of their battalions who are employed secondarily as musicians. The RCR Band, in contrast, was a professional brass and reed band composed of military musicians. The band in its final state was formed at Wolseley Barracks in 1947. It subsequently moved to CFB Gagetown in 1970 as a consequence of the 1968 Canadian Forces unification. During this period, it participated in many high profile events including the Canadian Armed Forces Tattoo held as part of the 1967 Canadian Centennial. It also played at events as diverse as the 1980 Silver Broom curling championship in Fredericton, during the Royal Visit to New Brunswick in 1984, and at the 40th anniversary of the liberation of the Netherlands in 1985. The band also took part in the Trooping the Colours and other events as part of the RCR centennial celebration held in London, Ontario, in 1983. In its earlier forms, it was guided by the Standing Orders of The Royal Canadian Regiment of 1935, which constituted its activities. A notable member of the band is Jean-Pierre Montminy, an officer who has served in La Musique du Royal 22^{e} Régiment as well as at the Canadian Forces School of Music.

=== Directors ===
- Bugle Band:
  - WO1 G. Noakes (1972)
  - CWO Passmans (1972-1973)
  - CWO W. Brooks (1973-1974)
  - CWO R.B. Williams (2 August 1976 – 21 July 1982)
  - CWO N. Devries (21 July 1982 – 27 July 1988)
  - CWO A.A. Van Gogh (27 Jul 1988-1 January 1993)
  - CWO P.J. Buiteman (1 January 1993 – 1 August 1994)
- Pipe Band:
  - Pipe-Major William Gilmour (1970-1981)
  - Pipe-Major Gerry Pozywajlo (1981-1983)
  - Pipe-Major Doug Moulton (1983-1984)
  - Pipe-Major Richard Samways (1984-1986)
  - Pipe-Major Ken Whitehall (1986-1988)
  - Pipe-Major Hugh Macpherson (1988-1990)
  - Pipe-Major James McIntyre (1990-1992)
  - Pipe-Major Ian Ferguson (1992-1995)
  - Pipe-Major Bryan Duguid (1995-2002)
  - Pipe-Major Jeff Donnelly (2002-2004)
  - Pipe-Major Seann Alderman (2004-2006)
  - Pipe-Major Dave Lee (2006-2007)
  - Pipe-Major Mark Heagle (2007-2008)
  - Pipe-Major Dave Pierce (2008-2009)
  - Pipe-Major Brian Hilson (2009-2010)
  - Pipe-Major James Firth (2010-2014)
  - Pipe-Major James Malcolm (2014-2017)
  - Pipe-Major James Firth (2017-Present)
- Regimental Band:
  - Captain Michael Ryan (21 June 1905 – 26 August 1916)
  - Lieutenant H.G. Jones (26 August 1916-November 1919)
  - Captain Michael Ryan (November 1919-22 January 1924)
  - Captain L.K. Harrison (July 1924-September 1939)
  - Lieutenant J.E. Proderick (September 1939-April 1945)
  - WO1 B. Bacah (Bandmaster) Apr 1945 - 1946
  - Lieutenant William Armstrong (31 March 1946-October 1953)
  - Captain J. Purcell (October 1953-June 1963)
  - Captain Derek Stannard (June 1963-September 1969)
  - Captain John D. Collins (September 1969-July 1978)
  - Captain J.D. Montminy (July 1978-16 May 1980)
  - Captain D.W. Embree (16 May 1980 – 8 September 1987)
  - Captain J. Van Liempt (8 September 1987 – 28 December 1988)
  - Captain Kenneth Killingbeck (23 January 1989 – 1 September 1993)
  - Captain W. F. Eberts (1 September 1993 – 1 August 1995)

== Music ==
- "Hurrah for our boys in khaki" by Fred & Chas Adams, which was respectfully inscribed to the Royal Canadian Regiment, was published in Toronto by R.S. Williams & Sons, c. 1900. First line: "We've heard in song and story about the soldiers of the Queen" Chorus: "They fought the Boers at Paardeberg."
- "The Regimental March of the Royal Canadian Regiment" by Lieut. Langford and G. Offen was published by Capt. F.A. Lister, R.C.R., 1910. First line: "Oh! we're crushing the gravel again today"
- "March, The Royal Canadian Regiment" by Arthur W. Hughes was published in Toronto and Winnipeg by Whaley, Royce & Co., c. 1900.

== Perpetuation ==
War of 1812: The Royal Canadian Regiment perpetuates the 1st Regiment of the Middlesex Militia (1812–15) and the 1st Regiment of the Oxford Militia (1812–15).

First World War: The Regiment perpetuates a number of units of the Canadian Militia and the Canadian Expeditionary Force (CEF) of the First World War:

- Units of the Canadian Militia:
  - The London and Oxford Fusiliers (3rd Battalion, The Royal Canadian Regiment), which were formed by the amalgamation of:
    - The Canadian Fusiliers (City of London Regiment), which started as the "7th Infantry Battalion, 'Prince Arthur's Own'" in 1866, and
    - The Oxford Rifles, which started as the "Twenty-second Battalion Volunteer Militia Rifles, Canada" in 1863,
  - 2nd Machine Gun Battalion, Canadian Machine Gun Corps (1919–1938).
- Units of the Canadian Expeditionary Force (CEF):
  - 1st Canadian Infantry Battalion, CEF,
  - 33rd Canadian Infantry Battalion, CEF,
  - 71st Canadian Infantry Battalion, CEF,
  - 142nd Canadian Infantry Battalion, CEF,
  - 168th Canadian Infantry Battalion, CEF,
  - 2nd Battalion, Canadian Machine Gun Corps, CEF, which was formed from:
    - 4th Canadian Machine Gun Company,
    - 5th Canadian Machine Gun Company,
    - 6th Canadian Machine Gun Company, and the
    - 14th Canadian Machine Gun Company.

== See also ==
- The Canadian Crown and the Canadian Forces
- List of Canadian organizations with royal patronage
- Royal Canadian Regiment Museum
- 3rd Battalion, The Royal Canadian Regiment
- Military history of Canada
- History of the Canadian Army
- Canadian Forces
- Maroon beret
- The Canadian Guards

== Order of precedence ==
Regular Force:

Preceded by None; first in precedence of infantry regiments	The Royal Canadian Regiment	Succeeded by Princess Patricia's Canadian Light Infantry

Reserve Force:

Preceded by The Lincoln and Welland Regiment	4th Battalion, The Royal Canadian Regiment	Succeeded by The Royal Highland Fusiliers of Canada

== Badge ==
Coat of arms of Royal Canadian Regiment
Notes Blazon of the badge: on an eight-pointed diamond-cut star Argent a bezant inscribed VRI, the cypher of Queen Victoria, in letters Argent and encircled by a rope Or surmounted in chief with the Royal Crown proper. Adopted June 20, 2008. Motto PRO PATRIA (meaning 'For my country'). Symbolism The star is a customary infantry badge shape from the 19th century. King George V granted the regiment the right to wear in perpetuity Queen Victoria's cypher (VRI) in memory of the sovereign under whose reign the regiment was raised and in view of the services the regiment rendered in the Great War.

== Possible specialist Arctic sovereignty role ==
In 2021 it was suggested in a Canadian professional military journal that the regiment's third battalion (3 RCR) could be adapted to become a specialized light infantry battalion that could deploy parachute infantry and marine infantry company groups to protect Canada's sovereignty in the Arctic.

== Books ==
- Lt. Col. (RET) Reverend Lyman R. Coleman, Honorary Chaplain to The Royal Canadian Regiment. "Called To Serve" (The Regimental Warehouse; 31 May 2010).
- Lt. Col. (RET) Reverend Lyman R. Coleman, Honorary Chaplain to The Royal Canadian Regiment. "In This Sign"
- Strome Galloway "Sicily, to the Siegfried Line" (The Regimental Warehouse; 3 July 2009)
- Strome Galloway "Some Died at Ortona; The Royal Canadian Regiment at War in Italy 1943" (The Regimental Warehouse; 3 July 2009)
- Bernd Horn "Establishing a Legacy: The History of the Royal Canadian Regiment 1883–1953" (Dundurn; 19/05/2008) ISBN 1550028170
- "Presentation of colours to the Second Battalion, The Royal Canadian Regiment, by Field Marshal His Royal Highness the Duke of Edinburgh K.G., Colonel-in-Chief of the Regiment, nominated by Her Majesty the Queen to make this presentation, Fort York, Germany, 17th October 1955." (Aldershot, Gale & Polden, The Wellington Press, 1955)
- "Honour roll : the Royal Canadian Regiment : Northwest Rebellion 1885 to United Nations operations Korea 1950–53" (Ottawa : Public Relations, the Royal Canadian Regiment, 1961)
- "Standing rules for officers' messes of the Royal Canadian Regiment" (Canada; Director of Artillery, ©1913)
- "A short history of the Royal Canadian Regiment, 1883–1964" (London Ont. : The Regiment, 1964.)
- Bernd Horn "Doing Canada Proud: The Second Boer War and the Battle of Paardeberg."

== Fiction ==
- Martin Marais "The Battle of Paardeberg: Lord Roberts' Gambit."
