= Battle of Kowang-san =

1951 battle of the Korean War

Battle of Kowang-san or Battle of Hill 355
- Part of the Korean War
Date	3–4 October 1951
Location	Kowang-san, Yeoncheon County, Gyeonggi Province, South Korea
Result	United Nations and Canadian victory

Belligerents
United Nations: Canada	China

Units involved
(Canada) Royal 22nd Regiment (Canada) 2 PPCLI (Canada) Royal Canadian Regiment (United Kingdom) King's Own Scottish Borderers (United Kingdom) King's Shropshire Light Infantry (Australia) 3 RAR	(China) People's Volunteer Army

Battle of Kowang-san or Battle of Hill 355
- Part of the Korean War
Date	22–25 November 1951
Location	Kowang-san, Yeoncheon County, Gyeonggi Province, South Korea
Result	United Nations and Canadian victory

Belligerents
United Nations: Canada	China

Units involved
(Canada) Royal 22nd Regiment	(China) People's Volunteer Army

Strength
21	14,000

Casualties and losses
16 killed	

Battle of Kowang-san or Battle of Hill 355
- Part of the Korean War
Date	23–24 October 1952
Location	Kowang-san, Yeoncheon County, Gyeonggi Province, South Korea
Result	United Nations and Canadian victory

Belligerents
United Nations: Canada	China

Units involved
(Canada) Royal Canadian Regiment	(China) People's Volunteer Army

Strength
21	14,000

Casualties and losses
18 killed	

The Battle of Kowang-san (Korean: 고왕산 전투), also known as the Battle of Hill 355, was fought during the Korean War between United Nations Command (UN) forces—primarily the Royal 22nd Regiment / the Royal Canadian Regiment—and the Chinese People's Volunteer Army (PVA) at Kowang-san (Kowang mountain), it was nicknamed "Little Gibraltar" by UN troops because of its prominent size and many defensive positions.

== First battle (3–4 October 1951) ==
On 3 October 1951, the 1st Commonwealth Division attempted to capture Hill 355 (Kowang-san) and adjoining features from the Chinese People's Volunteer Army (PVA) as a part of the Operation Commando carried out by UN forces.

The following day, KOSBs captured Hill 355 (Kowang-san), KSLI captured Hill 277, 3 RAR captured Hill 199, Royal 22nd Regiment captured area of Gangseo-ri, 2 PPCLI captured area of west Bugok-ri, Royal Canadian Regiment captured area of Hill 187.

== Second battle (22–25 November 1951) ==
The U.S. 3rd Infantry Division, holding the summit of Hill 355 (Kowang-san), known as "Little Gibraltar", was pushed off the strategic and commanding position by an assault of several divisions of PVA soldiers. Royal 22nd Regiment (Van Doos) was attacked by the Chinese People's Volunteer Army (PVA), but held on to the west flank of Hill 355 (Kowang-san). A special operations platoon of 20 men led by Léo Major in an overnight assault captured Hill 227 on the west flank of Hill 355 overlooking the RCR positions.

The following day, the US 3rd Division attempted to recapture Hill 355 summit, in a fierce battle over two days recovered the position.

16 Canadians were killed, 34 wounded, and 3 taken prisoner.

US 3rd Division sustained many casualties in the three-day battle.

== Third battle (23–24 October 1952) ==
The battle started with Royal Canadian Regiment occupying the hilltop. A Chinese artillery assault followed by an infantry attack dislodged many of them. This was followed by an overnight Canadian artillery barrage, which had strong effect against the Chinese troops, who had not had an opportunity to find shelter, then a Canadian infantry counter-attack.

18 Canadians were killed, 35 wounded, and 14 taken prisoner, the second-highest daily Canadian casualty count in the Korean War.

== Memorial ==
Royal Canadian Regiment commemorate this battle on 25 October (Kowang-San Day).
