= 33rd Battalion, CEF =

Canadian infantry battalion

The 33rd Battalion, CEF, was an infantry battalion of the Canadian Expeditionary Force during the Great War.

== History ==
The battalion was authorized on 7 November 1914 and embarked for Great Britain on 1 April 1916. It was re designated as the 33rd Reserve Battalion, CEF on 6 April 1916 and it provided reinforcements for the Canadian Corps in the field until 6 July 1916, when its personnel were absorbed by the 36th Battalion, CEF. The battalion was disbanded on 17 July 1917.

The 33rd Battalion recruited and was mobilized in London, Ontario.

The 33rd Battalion had two Officers Commanding:

- Lt.-Col. A Wilson, 17 March 1916 – 2 June 1916
- Maj. A.E. Bywater, 2 June 1916 – 2 August 1916

The 33rd Battalion was awarded the battle honour The GREAT WAR 1916.

== Perpetuation ==
The 33rd Battalion, CEF, is perpetuated by The Royal Canadian Regiment.

== See also ==
- List of infantry battalions in the Canadian Expeditionary Force

== Sources ==
- Canadian Expeditionary Force 1914-1919 by Col. G.W.L. Nicholson, CD, Queen's Printer, Ottawa, Ontario, 1962
