= 1st Battalion (Ontario Regiment), CEF =

1st Canadian Battalion (Ontario Regiment), CEF
- Patch of the 1st Battalion CEF as part of the 1st Infantry Brigade, 1st Canadian Division
- Active: 1914-1919
- Country: Canada
- Branch: Canadian Expeditionary Force
- Type: Infantry battalion
- Part of: 1st Canadian Brigade, 1st Canadian Division
- Engagements: World War I; Ypres 1915; Battle of Gravenstafel; Battle of St. Julien; Festubert, 1915; Battle of Mount Sorrel; Somme 1916; Battle of Pozieres; Battle of Flers-Courcelette; Battle of Ancre Heights; Battle of Arras (1917); Battle of Vimy Ridge; Battle of Arleux; Battle of Hill 70; Battle of Passchendaele; Battle of Amiens; Battle of Drocourt-Queant Line; Hindenburg Line; Canal du Nord; Pursuit to Mons; France and Flanders 1915-1918
- Battle honours: Ypres and along the Western Front.

The 1st Canadian Infantry Battalion was a battalion of the Canadian Expeditionary Force that saw service in the First World War.

== History ==
The battalion was created on 2 September 1914 with recruits from "Military District 1" which was Western Ontario. The battalion set off for England on board the Laurentic berthed in Quebec. They arrived in England on 14 October 1914 with a strength of 45 officers and 1121 men. The battalion became part of the 1st Canadian Division, 1st Canadian Infantry Brigade where it saw action at Ypres and along the Western Front.

The battalion returned to Canada on 21 April 1919, was demobilized on 24 April 1919, and disbanded soon after.

== Perpetuation ==
The 1st Canadian Infantry Battalion was initially perpetuated by The Canadian Fusiliers (City of London Regiment), and is currently perpetuated by The Royal Canadian Regiment.

== Battle honours ==
=== The Great War ===
- Ypres 1915, 17
- Gravenstafel
- St. Julien
- Festubert, 1915
- Mount Sorrel
- Somme 1916
- Pozieres
- Flers-Courcelette
- Ancre Heights
- Arras 1917-1918
- Vimy 1917
- Arleux
- Scarpe 1917, 1918
- Hill 70
- Passchendaele
- Amiens
- Drocourt –Queant
- Hindenburg Line
- Canal du Nord
- Pursuit to Mons
- France and Flanders 1915-1918.

== Notable Members ==
Lieutenant Frederick William Campbell was awarded the Victoria Cross for his heroism in action 15 June 1915 at Givenchy, France; he died of wounds four days later.

== See also ==
- List of infantry battalions in the Canadian Expeditionary Force
