= 168th Battalion (Oxfords), CEF =

WWI unit raised in 1915, absorbed in 1917

The 168th Battalion, CEF was a unit in the Canadian Expeditionary Force during the First World War. Based in Woodstock, Ontario, the unit began recruiting during the winter of 1915/16 in Oxford County, Ontario. After sailing to England in November 1916, the battalion was absorbed into the 4th and 6th Reserve Battalions on January 4, 1917. The 168th Battalion, CEF had one Officer Commanding: Lieut-Col. W. K. McMullen.
