= 71st Battalion, CEF =

Canadian infantry battalion

The 71st Battalion, CEF was an infantry battalion of the Canadian Expeditionary Force during the Great War. The 71st Battalion was authorized on 15 August 1915 and embarked for Great Britain on 1 April 1916. It provided reinforcements to the Canadian Corps in the field until 30 September 1916, when its personnel were absorbed by the '44th', '51st', '54th' and '74th Battalion(s), CEF'. The battalion was disbanded on 11 April 1918.

The 71st Battalion recruited in and was mobilized in Woodstock, Ontario.

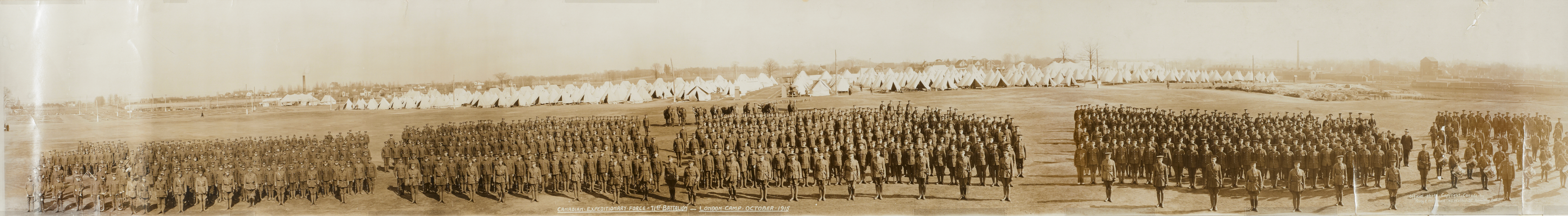
Canadian Expeditionary Force, 71st Battalion, CEF, London Camp, October, 1915 (HS85-10-31091)

The 71st Battalion had four Officers Commanding:

- Lt.-Col. D.M. Sutherland, 1 April 1916 – 4 June 1916
- Lt.-Col. A.J. McCausland, 4 June 1916 – 19 July 1916
- Maj. J.C. Massie, 19 July 1916 – 1 September 1916
- Maj. J.A.C. Makins, 1 September 1916 – 28 September 1916

The 71st Battalion was awarded the battle honour THE GREAT WAR 1916.

The 71st Battalion, CEF, is perpetuated by The Royal Canadian Regiment.

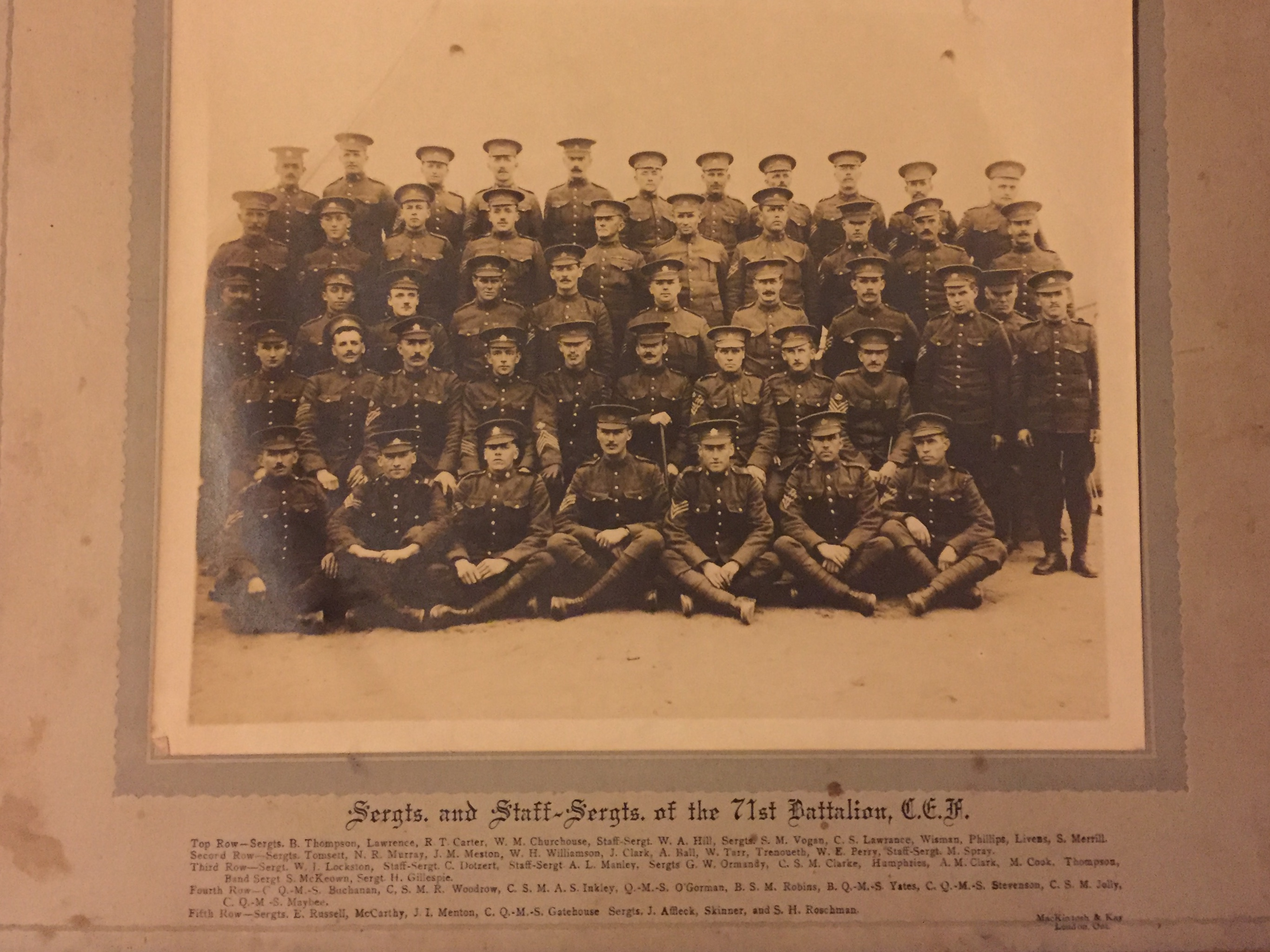

== Sources ==
- Canadian Expeditionary Force 1914-1919 by Col. G.W.L. Nicholson, CD, Queen's Printer, Ottawa, Ontario, 1962
