= USS Michael Murphy =

American Arleigh Burke-class destroyer

USS Michael Murphy (DDG-112)
- USS Michael Murphy at Pearl Harbor in March 2013

History

United States
- Name: Michael Murphy
- Namesake: Michael P. Murphy
- Awarded: 13 September 2002
- Builder: Bath Iron Works
- Laid down: 18 June 2010
- Launched: 8 May 2011
- Sponsored by: Maureen Murphy
- Christened: 7 May 2011
- Commissioned: 6 October 2012
- Home port: Pearl Harbor
- Identification: MMSI number: 303966000; Callsign: NMPH; Hull number: DDG-112
- Motto: Lead the Fight
- Honors and awards: See Awards
- Status: in active service
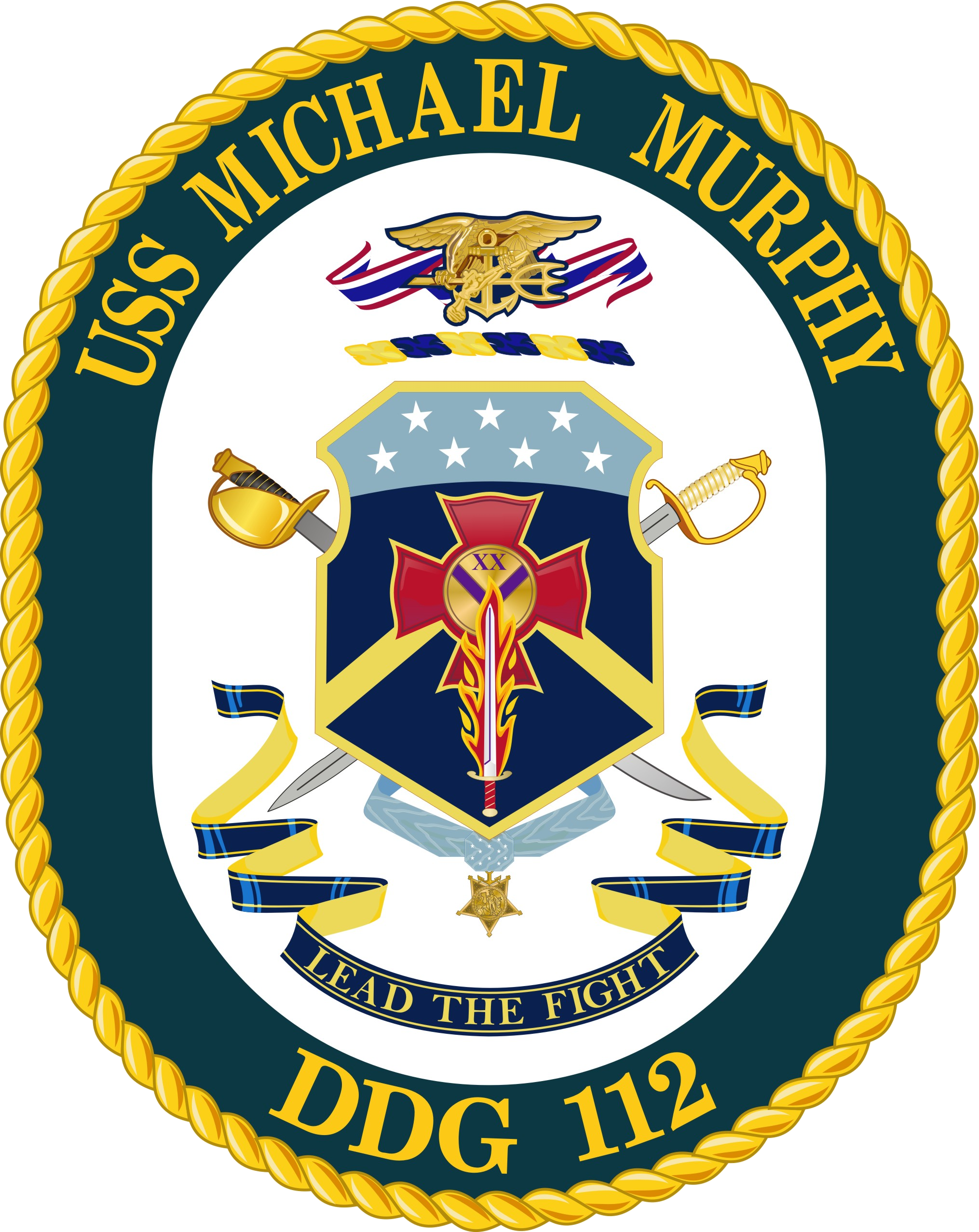
- Badge

General characteristics
- Class & type: Arleigh Burke-class destroyer
- Displacement: 9,200 tons
- Length: 510 ft (160 m)
- Beam: 66 ft (20 m)
- Draft: 33 ft (10 m)
- Propulsion: 4 × General Electric LM2500-30 gas turbines, 2 shafts, 100,000 shp (75 MW)
- Speed: 35+ knots
- Complement: 323 Sailors (23 officers and 300 enlisted)
- Armament: Guns: 1 × 5-inch (127 mm)/62 Mk 45 Mod 4 (lightweight gun); 1 × 20 mm (0.8 in) Phalanx CIWS; 2 × 25 mm (0.98 in) Mk 38 machine gun system; 4 × 0.50 in (12.7 mm) caliber guns; Missiles: 1 × 32-cell, 1 × 64-cell (96 total cells) Mk 41 vertical launching system (VLS): RIM-66M surface-to-air missile; RIM-156 surface-to-air missile; RIM-174A Standard ERAM; RIM-161 anti-ballistic missile; RIM-162 ESSM (quad-packed); BGM-109 Tomahawk cruise missile; RUM-139 vertical launch ASROC; Torpedoes: 2 × Mark 32 triple torpedo tubes: Mark 46 lightweight torpedo; Mark 50 lightweight torpedo; Mark 54 lightweight torpedo
- Aircraft carried: 2 × MH-60R Seahawk helicopters

USS Michael Murphy (DDG-112) is an Arleigh Burke-class (Flight IIA) Aegis guided missile destroyer in the United States Navy and is the last Flight IIA variant. She is named for Medal of Honor recipient Lieutenant Michael P. Murphy (1976–2005). Murphy was posthumously awarded the Medal of Honor for his actions during Operation Red Wings in Afghanistan in June 2005. He was the first sailor awarded the Medal of Honor since the Vietnam War. The ship's name was announced by Secretary of the Navy, Donald C. Winter on 7 May 2008. The ship was christened on 7 May 2011, Murphy's birthday, by her sponsor Maureen Murphy, Michael Murphy's mother. The ship is part of Destroyer Squadron 31 of Naval Surface Group Middle Pacific.

Michael Murphy was intended to be the last ship of the Arleigh Burke-class destroyers but, following the cancellation of the Zumwalt-class destroyer program after the completion of the first three vessels, the Navy continued construction on the Arleigh Burke class.

== Construction and commissioning ==
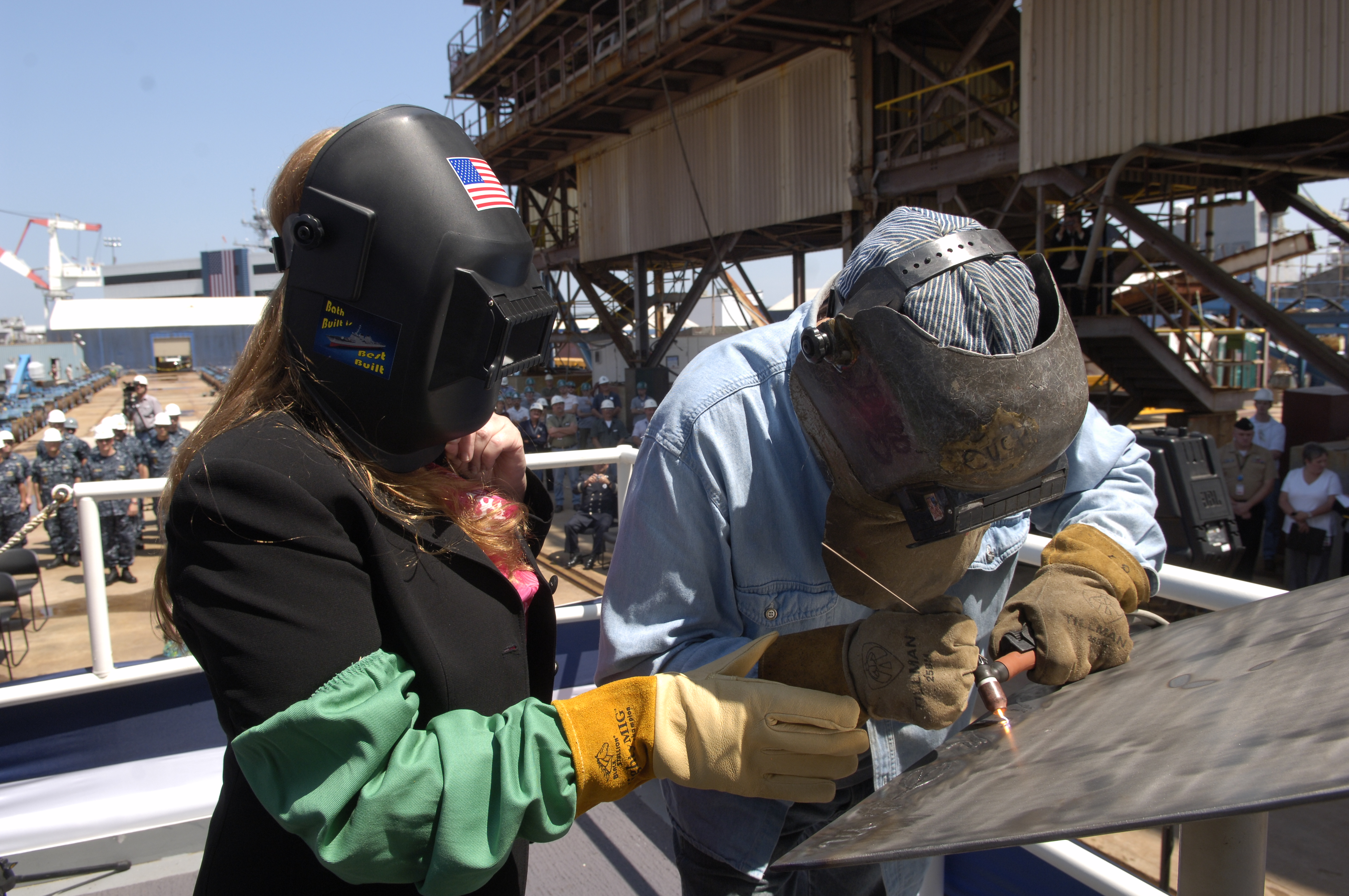
Maureen Murphy, left, and Edwin Bard inscribe the signatures of Michael Murphy's family on an iron plate during a dedication ceremony.

Her contract was awarded on 13 September 2002 to the Bath Iron Works and the first cut of steel was made by Vice Admiral John Morgan, the first commanding officer of lead ship of the class, Arleigh Burke. The ship's keel was laid down on 18 June 2010, and during the event, Maureen Murphy and Edwin Bard inscribed the signatures of Murphy's family on an iron plate during a dedication cerrmony for Michael Murphy. The plate was affixed to the ship's hull during construction. After her christening, the destroyer was moved to dry dock for several months in order to finalize construction. On 1 October 2012 the destroyer arrived in New York for her commissioning, which occurred on 6 October.

== Service history ==
=== 2012 ===
On 16 October 2012 Michael Murphy arrived in Barbados for her first international port of call. Led by Ambassador Larry L. Palmer, dozens of sailors ventured out into the community to help the children of Barbados at the Boscobelle Primary School and the Queen Elizabeth Hospital. The sailors presented stuffed animals to the children at the hospital. At the primary school, the crew members helped to beautify the school grounds by planting trees, as well as clearing away brush and debris. The students of the primary school also had stuffed animals donated to them by the sailors. On 21 November, Michael Murphy arrived at her home port of Naval Station Pearl Harbor, part of Joint Base Pearl Harbor–Hickam.

=== 2013 ===
On 15 February 2013 Michael Murphy held her first family day cruise. On 23 May 2013 Michael Murphy held her first change of command ceremony at Joint Base Pearl Harbor–Hickam.

=== 2014 ===
On 4 February 2014, Michael Murphy participated with aviation forces from the Army, Navy, Air Force and Marine Corps in joint training exercise Koa Kai. Participating units conducted integrated flight operations, anti-surface and anti-submarine training. On 28 February, the Royal Canadian Navy ship HMCS Protecteur suffered a fire and breakdown approximately 340 nautical miles (630 km) northeast of Pearl Harbor that left the ship stranded without power, lighting or water. Michael Murphy, already underway, was immediately dispatched to assist in towing and recovery efforts. Michael Murphy received 17 family members of the crew and two civilian contractors from Protecteur; however, due to adverse weather conditions, Michael Murphy's attempts to take her under tow were unsuccessful. USS Chosin, a Ticonderoga-class cruiser, arrived two days later, connected to and towed the stricken ship until the towing cable broke. Finally, USNS Sioux, a Powhatan-class fleet ocean tug, arrived on 2 March to assume the towing duties and brought Protecteur into Naval Station Pearl Harbor on 6 March.

On 7 July 2014 Michael Murphy departed Joint Base Pearl Harbor–Hickam to participate in the at-sea phase of the multinational exercise Rim of the Pacific (RIMPAC). On 26 June, RIMPAC 2014 commenced and Michael Murphy participated in all 36 days, including the closing reception on 1 August. On 20 October 2014, Michael Murphy departed on her first deployment to the Western Pacific with the United States Seventh Fleet.

=== 2015 ===
On 26 May 2015, Michael Murphy was awarded with a Canadian Forces' Unit Commendation in recognition of the service she provided to the stranded Canadian naval vessel HMCS Protecteur after she had caught fire at sea.

=== 2017 ===
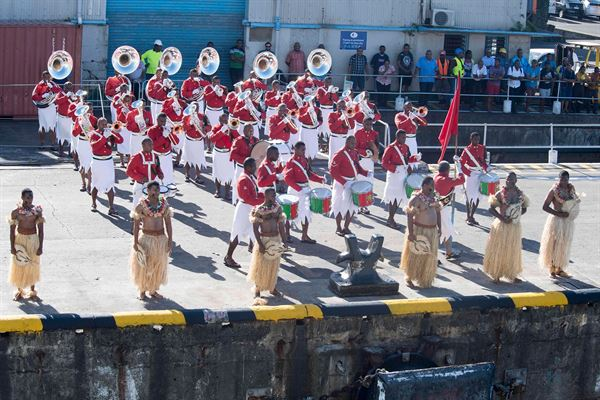
The Fiji Military Forces Band performs as the USS Michael Murphy docks in Suva, Fiji.

In January 2017, Michael Murphy, along with sister Arleigh Burke-class destroyer USS Wayne E. Meyer and Ticonderoga-class cruiser USS Lake Champlain, accompanied Nimitz-class aircraft carrier USS Carl Vinson in a deployment to the western Pacific. In April of that year, the Carl Vinson Carrier Strike Group (CSG) cancelled a scheduled port call in Australia in response to increasing tensions between North Korea (DPRK) and the United States over the DPRK's nuclear weapons program.

=== 2018 ===
Michael Murphy participated in KAKADU 2018, a multinational exercise hosted by the Royal Australian Navy. During the sea phase of the exercise, forces from twenty-seven countries will train together in several complex warfighting scenarios, including an air defense exercise, gunnery exercise, search and rescue training, underway replenishment approaches, anti-submarine warfare vulnerability training, and divisional tactics.

=== 2019 ===
Michael Murphy deployed to the U.S. Fourth Fleet area of operations, following her participation in exercises UNITAS LX and Teamwork South 2019 in Valparaiso, Chile, from 24 June to 3 July.

=== 2024 ===
Michael Murphy arrived at the Port of Colombo, Sri Lanka on 23 July 2024 on a formal visit. The vessel was scheduled to depart the island on 26 July 2024.

Michael Murphy arrived at the port of Colombo on a replenishment visit on 16 November 2024. The vessel was captained by Commander Jonathan B. Greenwald and was scheduled to depart on 17 November 2024.

=== 2026 ===
On 12 April during the 2026 Iran war peace talks she and her sister ship USS Frank E. Petersen Jr. transited the Strait of Hormuz from the Arabian Sea, to "begin setting the conditions" toward removing the sea mines placed by the Iran Revolutionary Guard Corps.

On the 7th of September, the Commander of Michael Murphy, Caitlin Cunningham, was relieved of duty, with the U.S. Navy citing "loss of confidence".

== Awards ==
- Battle "E" – (2021)
- Coast Guard Meritorious Team Commendation - (2020)
- Canadian Forces' Unit Commendation - (2014)
- Retention Excellence Award - (2019)
- Arleigh Burke Fleet Trophy - (2024)
