= USNS Sioux =

US Navy Tugboat

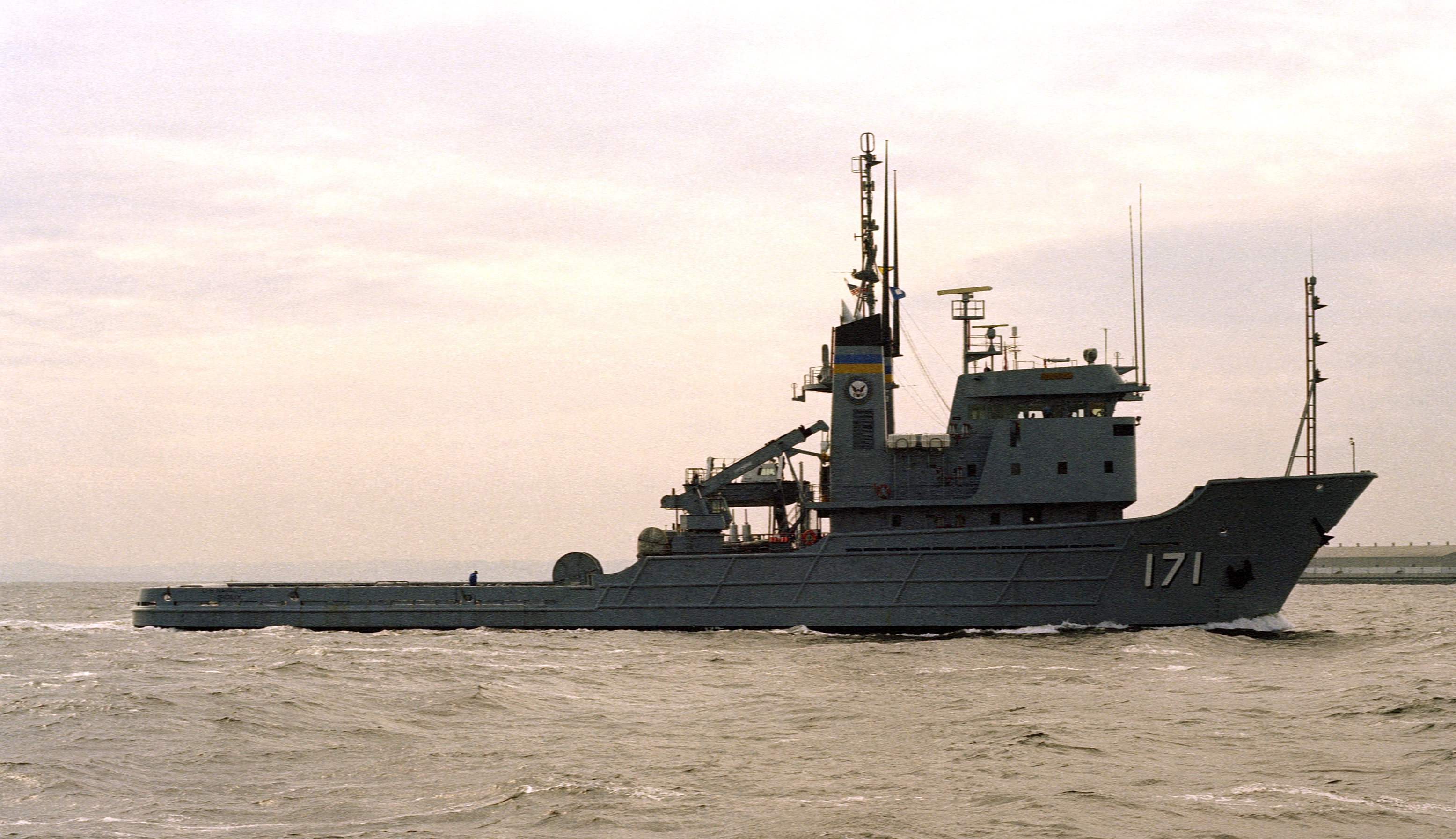
- USNS Sioux (T-ATF-171) entering Yokosuka Naval Base, 1984

History

United States
- Name: USNS Sioux
- Namesake: The Sioux, a Native American people
- Builder: Marinette Marine Corporation, Marinette, Wisconsin
- Laid down: 22 March 1979
- Launched: 15 November 1980
- Acquired: 1 May 1981
- Out of service: 2021
- Stricken: 30 September 2021
- Identification: Callsign: NJOV; Hull number: T-ATF-171
- Status: Stricken, Final Disposition Pending

General characteristics
- Class & type: Powhatan-class tugboat
- Displacement: 2,260 long tons (2,296 t) fully loaded
- Length: 226 ft (69 m)
- Beam: 42 ft (13 m)
- Draft: 15 ft (4.6 m)
- Installed power: 5.73 megawatts (7,680 hp) sustained
- Propulsion: 2 × General Motors EMD 20-645F7B diesel engines, two shafts with hydraulic adjustable pitch props; Brunvoll bow thruster, 224 kW (300 hp)
- Speed: 15 knots (28 km/h; 17 mph)
- Complement: 16 civilians plus 4 U.S. Navy personnel (communications unit)

USNS Sioux (T-ATF-171) is a United States Navy Powhatan-class tugboat formerly operated by the Military Sealift Command (MSC). She was in service from 1981 to 2021 and spent the bulk of this time supporting the Pacific Fleet.

== Construction and characteristics ==
The contract for the first four Powhatan-class tugs was awarded to Marinette Marine Co. on 12 September 1975. The Navy exercised its option to buy an additional three ships under this contract on 27 February 1978. Sioux was the second ship delivered under the contract extension.

Sioux was laid down on 22 March 1979 at the company's Marinette, Wisconsin shipyard. She was launched on 15 November 1980, and delivered to the Navy on 1 May 1981.

Her hull was built of welded steel plates. She was 225 feet 11 inches (68.86 m) long at the waterline and 240 feet 1 inch (73.18 m) overall, with a beam of 42 feet (13 m), and a draft of 15 feet (4.6 m). She displaced 2,260 tons fully loaded.

As originally built, Sioux had two controllable-pitch Kort-nozzle propellers for propulsion. She had two 20-cylinder Diesel engines, GM EMD 20-645F7B, which provided 4,500 shaft horsepower. These would drive the ships at 15 knots. She also had a 300-horsepower bow thruster to improve maneuverability.

Electrical power aboard the ship was provided by three 400 Kw generators. These were powered by four Detroit Diesel 8v-71 engines.

Powhatan-class tugs had global range in order to support the U.S. fleet across oceans. Sioux's tankage was consequently large. She could carry 206,714 U.S. gallons (782,500 L) of Diesel oil, 6,100 U.S. gallons (23,000 L) of lube oil, and 6,000 U.S. gallons (23,000 L) of drinking water. Her unrefueled range at 13 knots was 10,000 miles (16,000 km)

Sioux's aft deck was largely open to accommodate a number of different roles. It had 4,000 square feet (370 m^{2}) of working space. One of the missions of a fleet tug was to tow disabled warships back to port. She was equipped with a SMATCO 66 DTS-200 towing winch for service as a towboat. The towing system could accommodate either wire rope or synthetic-fiber hawsers and produce as much as 90 short tons of bollard pull. She had a 10-ton capacity crane for moving loads on the aft deck. There were connections to bolt down shipping containers and other equipment.

Like all MSC ships, Sioux was crewed by civilian mariners. At launch, her complement was 16 civilian crew and a 4-person military detachment of communications specialists. The ship could accommodate an additional 16 people aboard for transient, mission-specific roles.

All the ships of the Powhatan-class were named after Native American tribes. Sioux was named after the Sioux people.

== Service history ==
Winds were gusting to 62 knots in the Strait of Juan de Fuca on 5 December 1981. Sioux was towing the berthing and messing barge YRBM-26 when the tow pendant broke and the barge was driven onto the beach on the southern tip of Vancouver Island. Sioux's first attempt to pull the barge off the beach failed. With the assistance of a higher tide, the U.S. Navy's Mobile Diving and Salvage Unite One, and the Canadian Navy Fleet Diving Unit, Sioux was able to refloat the barge and tow it to Bremerton, Washington on 21 December 1981.

Team Spirit '84 was a military exercise between the United States and Republic of Korea which practiced amphibious assaults on Korea's southeast coast. Sioux participated in the exercise.

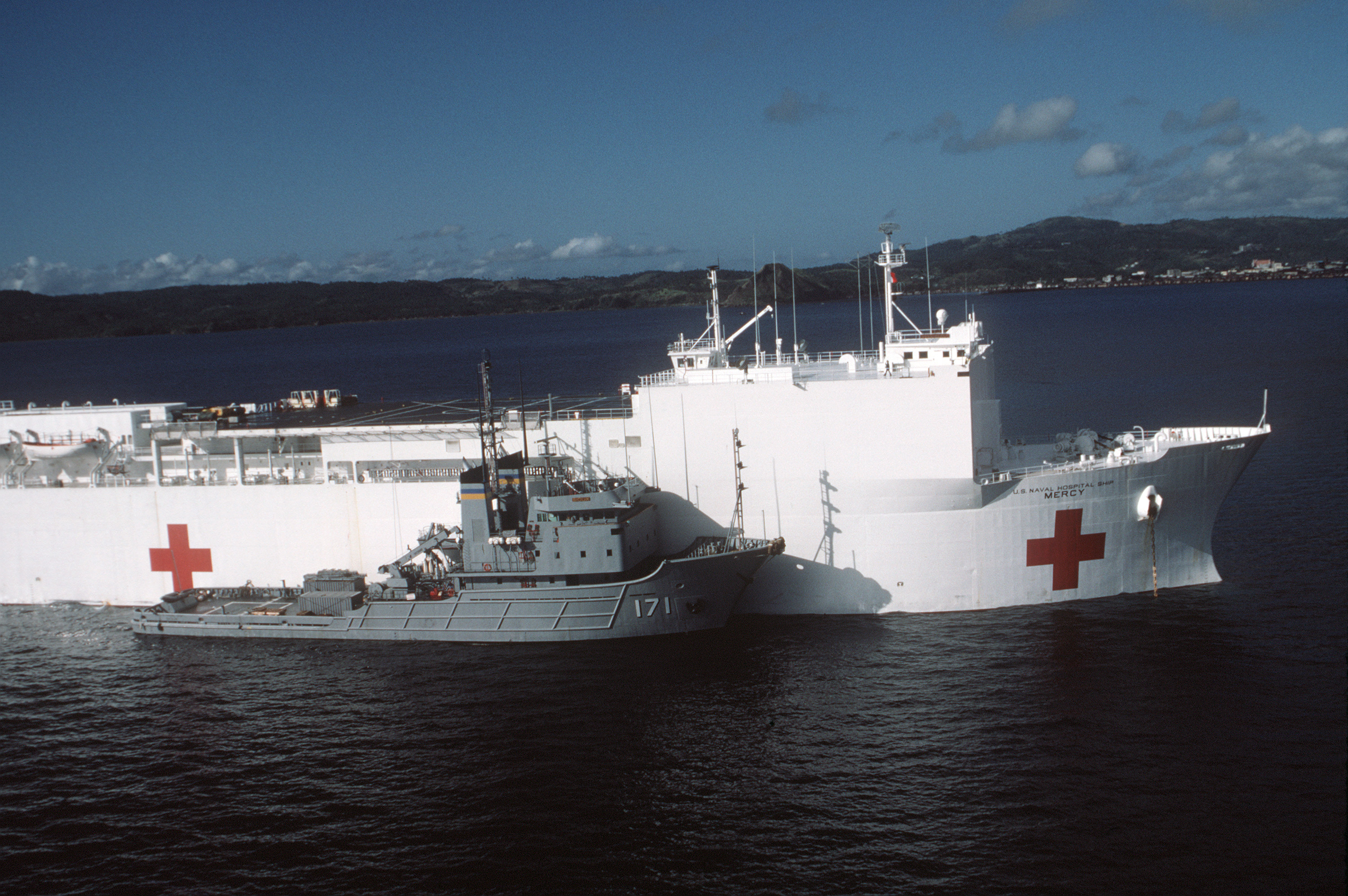
Sioux and USNS Mercy in the Philippines

Sioux accompanied hospital ship USNS Mercy on a 4-and-a-half month training and humanitarian mission to provide health care services to underserved communities in the west Pacific. The ships made seven port calls in the Philippines as well as stops in Papua New Guinea and Fiji. The ships returned to San Francisco on 13 July 1987.

The ship was back in the Philippines in 1988. She exercised towing with USS Reeves in Subic Bay, Philippines in May. Sioux also delivered relief supplies to coastal villages that had been cut-off from aid by road and bridge failures in the wake of a series of typhoons.

On 5 May 1989, a fire broke out in the boiler room of USS White Plains. The fire killed and injured a number of the crew and the ship was disabled. Sioux towed her to Subic Bay, where the fire damage was repaired.

In the aftermath of the Gulf War, in May 1991, she arrived in the Persian Gulf with an embarked Mobile Diving and Salvage Unit to relieve USS Beaufort.

In November 1994, Sioux was dispatched to recover the wreck of an F-14 Tomcat which crashed while attempting to land on USS Abraham Lincoln about 50 miles from the coast of souther California.

Sioux was dispatched to assist in the investigation of Alaska Flight 261 which crashed into the Pacific near Anacapa Island in February 2000.

In 2002 Sioux towed the Floating Instrument Platform 20 miles northwest of Oahu to conduct research.

In February 2007, Sioux assisted in the recovery of a MH-60S Seahawk helicopter which crashed on a training mission about 50 miles off the California coast. She had embarked a remotely operated vehicle configured for salvage operations called "Deep Drone 8000".

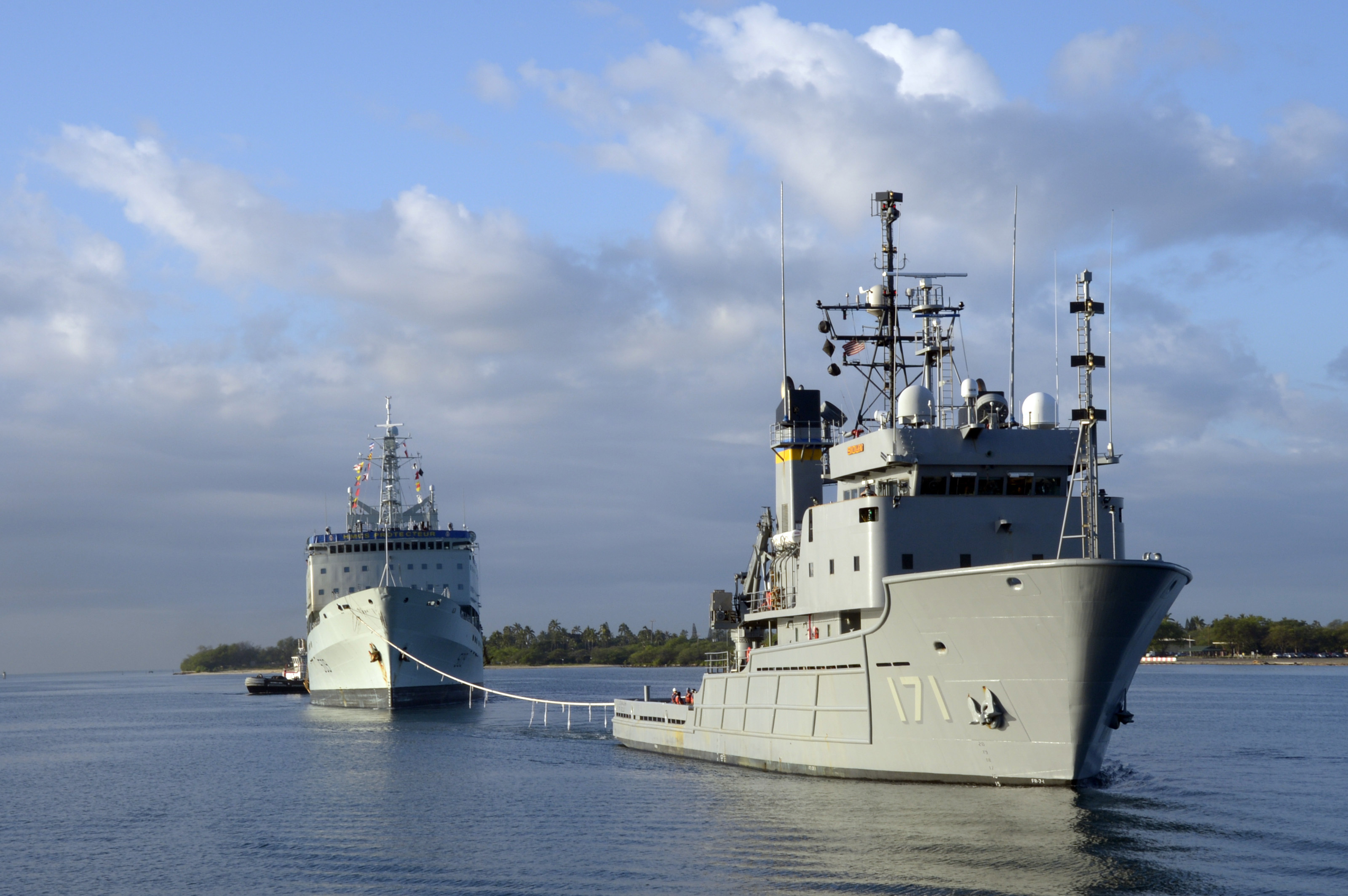
Sioux tows HMCS Protecteur into Pearl Harbor in 2014

In September and October 2008, she participated in salvage and recovery efforts for a B-52 that crashed into the sea off Guam.

On 12 November 2009, Sioux was dispatched to recover the flight recorders of a U.S. Coast Guard C-130 which crashed in the sea after colliding with a U.S. Marine Corps AH-1W SuperCobra helicopter off the coast of California.

In September 2010, Sioux served as a platform for undersea glider tests sponsored by the Office of Naval Research.

In October 2010, Sioux exercised submarine rescue operations with the Chilean Navy in "Chilemar II".

In February 2012, Sioux exercised salvage diving skills with the Indian Navy in "Salvex 2012".

In March 2014, Sioux came to the aid of the Royal Canadian Navy vessel HMCS Protecteur which been disabled by an engine room fire off Hawaii. After receiving aid from USS Michael Murphy and USS Chosin, Sioux arrived to take the vessel under tow. The tug brought the damaged ship into Pearl Harbor safely. For that mission, Sioux was awarded a Canadian Forces Unit Commendation in June 2015.

=== Decommissioned ship tows ===
Vessels which are retired from Navy service are often towed to various inactive ship maintenance facilities where they are held in reserve. Ultimately, they are towed on to their final fate. These decommissioned ships do not have full crews and cannot sail under their own power. Sioux was employed to tow decommissioned ships.

Tow	From	To	Date	Notes
ex- New Jersey	Bremerton, Washington	Long Beach Naval Shipyard	July 1981	Sioux accompanied USNS Navajo as she towed the battleship to the shipyard to prepare for reactivation.
Ex-Narwhal	Panama Canal	San Diego, California	May 2001	While accompanying USNS Navajo, which had ex-Narwhal in tow at the time, Sioux received a mayday call from a sinking sailboat in Bahia Magdelana, Mexico. Sioux broke away from the tow to render assistance and rescued the two people aboard the yacht early on the morning of 14 May 2001. She received a "well done" message from Vice Admiral Gordon S. Holder, commander of the Military Sealift Command for this rescue.
ex-Hyman G. Rickover	Panama Canal	Bremerton	May 2008	The sub was scrapped in Bremerton.
ex-Norfolk	Panama Canal	Bremerton	June 2016	The sub was scrapped in Bremerton.
ex-Ford	Bremerton, Washington	Hawaii	September 2019	Sioux towed the ship from Bremerton to waters near Hawaii. Here the tow was passed off to USNS Grasp which took the hulk to Guam where it was sunk in a live fire exercise.

=== RIMPAC participation ===
"Rim of the Pacific" (RIMPAC) is a multinational naval exercise hosted every two years in Hawaiian waters. It typically includes a live-fire exercise during which a decommissioned ship is sunk. Sioux towed several of these vessels on their final voyage, and has participated in other RIMPAC exercises as well.

2004: During May 2004, Sioux towed ex-Decatur from Port Hueneme, California to Pearl Harbor. The old destroyer was later sunk during a live fire exercise.

2008: participated.

2010: participated.

2018: On 10 July 2018, Sioux towed ex-Racine out of Pearl Harbor to deep waters where the ship was sunk in a live-fire exercise. A week later she towed ex-McClusky from Pearl Harbor to an exercise area 55 miles north of Kauai, where this ship was also sunk.

2020: Sioux towed ex-Durham from Pearl Harbor to an offshore exercise area where she was sunk during a live-fire exercise.

== Inactivation ==
She was inactivated on 30 September 2021 She is currently moored at Pearl Harbor awaiting a decision on her final disposition.

== Awards and honors ==
Sioux and her crew won several honors during her years of service. These include:

Navy Meritorious Unit Commendation for her work as part of the USNS Mercy task force in 1987.

Navy "E' Ribbon in 1989—90.

Canadian Forces Unit Commendation in 2015 for assistance to HMCS Protecteur.
