= Unit Commendation =

Unit Commendation may refer to:

- Bicentennial Unit Commendation Award, various awards
- Canadian Forces' Unit Commendation, a unit award of the Canadian Forces
- Commander-in-Chief Unit Commendation, a Canadian unit award
- Coast Guard Unit Commendation, a unit award of the United States Coast Guard
- Meritorious Unit Commendation, a unit award of the United States Armed Forces
- Navy Unit Commendation, a unit award of the United States Navy and United States Coast Guard
- Public Health Service Unit Commendation, a unit award of the United States Public Health Service Commissioned Corps
