= Joseph Vogelgesang =

Canadian army general (born 1924)

- Born: 1924 (age 101–102); Saskatchewan, Canada
- Military career
- Allegiance: Canada
- Branch: Canadian Army
- Service years: 1941–1945
- Unit: Calgary Highlanders
- Conflict: World War II; Normandy landings
- Awards: Legion of Honour

Joseph Vogelgesang (born 1924) is a Canadian veteran of World War II. He was part of the Calgary Highlanders infantry regiment that landed on Juno Beach during the Normandy landings on June 6, 1943. On the 80th anniversary of the landings, he was awarded the Legion of Honour, France's highest honour, by the French Consul General for his involvement in the liberation of France.

== Early life and service ==
Vogelgesang was born in 1924 and was the second of ten children. He worked on his family's farm in rural Saskatchewan. At the age of 17, he enlisted in the Canadian Army where he subsequently trained in Regina, Saskatchewan and Brandon, Manitoba.

He volunteered for with the Calgary Highlanders infantry regiment and was deployed to England in early 1944. At the age of 19, he landed on Juno Beach during the Normandy landings.

In 2024 he was awarded the Legion of Honour for his part in the landings and liberation of France by French Consul General Nicolas Baudouin. Reflecting on the anniversary of the landings, he told the Canadian Press of an interaction just prior to landing on Juno Beach,"My sergeant told me, if you live for the next 48 hours, you will live for a long time, and I learned a lot in 48 hours." "Nobody wins in a war," he told the Canadian Press while expressing a hope that if people understood the cruelty of war there would be less "need for the military in future".

Following the surrender of Nazi Germany to the Allies, Vogelgesang stayed as part of the peace core until June 1945 when he returned to Canada.

== Personal life ==
Vogelgesang was one of ten children growing up. He has three children, seven grandchildren, and four great-grandchildren. He now lives in Abbotsford, British Columbia.
