= Clan of the Gallant Canadians =

The Clan of the Gallant Canadians is an unofficial Order created by The Calgary Highlanders of the Canadian Forces and the first such regimental order to be approved by the Canadian sovereign, and the first in the British Empire and Commonwealth since the time of Oliver Cromwell.

== History ==
On Wednesday, 1 April 1992, the Clan of the Gallant Canadians was instituted as a Regimental award within The Calgary Highlanders, to be awarded to both serving soldiers and civilian members of the Regimental Family. Honorary Colonel Fred Mannix presented 21 awards on the occasion of the Regimental Birthday to inaugurate the Clan.

From "the Regimental Book":

In order to recognize the efforts of outstanding members of The Regiment and the community, an order was devised to show our appreciation for that individual's contributions. The reward is a permanent decoration and membership in the Clan of the Gallant Canadians. Persons who, by providing time and dedication, financial support, or a combination of both, have greatly improved the morale and well being of The Regiment may be considered for membership in the Clan. All Officers and Non Commissioned Members, Honorary Members, Associate Members and Members of the Ladies Auxiliary of The Calgary Highlanders are eligible to be awarded with a membership. Civilians who in any particular manner provide outstanding support to The Regiment may also be honoured in this manner.

The Clan was given Royal Assent in 1992.

George Milne, Regimental Secretary of the Calgary Highlanders in 1992, visited Buckingham Palace to meet Sir Robin Janvrin where he presented the designs and case for the proposed Clan of the Gallant Canadians medals. He did so and was asked to return at 10:00 a.m. the next day. Sir Robin had met with Her Majesty the Queen the day before and presented the proposal. The response from Her Majesty was, according to Mister Milne: "Tell George his medals are approved and are the first regimental medals approved since the time of Cromwell. As to George's query about my view of giving them to civilians as well, not only for auspicious service to the regiment but for donating substantial sums...I approve!"

"Tell George", she added, "that he is simply following in the footsteps of my grandfather King George V and Lloyd George, who sold our baronetcies for 20,000 pounds each in the grim days of the 1920s."

== Name ==
The Clan of the Gallant Canadians is patterned after the Scottish Clans, and the title is taken from the title of a poem written in honour of the 10th Battalion, CEF, and published in the Calgary Daily Herald on 10 September 1918.

== Grades ==
Four grades are recognized by the Clan, with presentations usually done on the Regimental Birthday (1 April) each year.

From highest to lowest, the grades are:

- Toshach
- Chieftain
- Henchman
- Clansman

== Method of wear ==
The insignia of the highest three grades of the order are worn suspended on a ribbon worn around the neck. The insignia of a Clansman is worn on a miniature medal ribbon. The insignia is only permitted to be worn on civilian dress. Females may wear the neck orders in the form of a brooch.

== Terms of award ==
Admittance to the Clan is granted by authority of the Regimental Funds Foundation, using two criteria:

a) meritorious service to the Regiment, or
b) monetary donations to the Regimental Funds Foundation

== Eligibility ==
Admittance to the Clan is open to any serving soldier, ex-soldier, or member of the public who has met the terms of the award and been selected and approved by the Regimental Funds Foundation.

== Sources ==
- Calgary Highlanders website
