= Battle of Walcheren Causeway =

1944 battle on the Western Front of World War II

- Part of Battle of the Scheldt
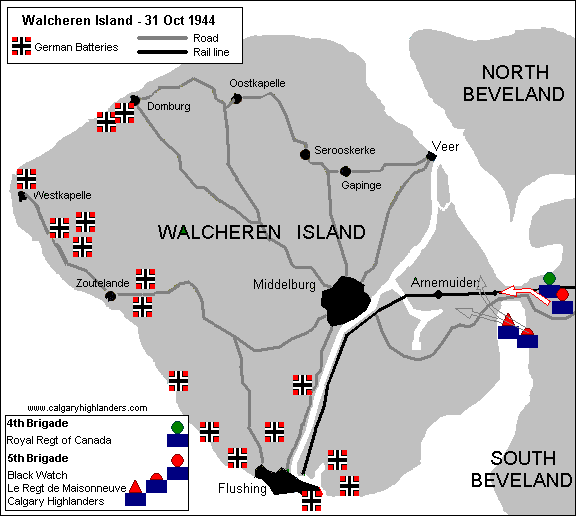
- Walcheren Island defences
Date	31 October 1944 – 2 November 1944
Location	Walcheren Island, Scheldt estuary 51°30′11″N 3°42′18″E
Result	Indecisive

Belligerents
Canada; United Kingdom	Germany

Commanders and leaders
William Jemmet Megill	Gustav-Adolf von Zangen

Units involved
52nd Infantry Division; 5th Canadian Infantry Brigade	15th Army

Casualties and losses
160 killed & wounded	60+ killed

The Battle of Walcheren Causeway (Operation Vitality) was an engagement of the Battle of the Scheldt between the 5th Canadian Infantry Brigade, elements of the 52nd (Lowland) Infantry Division and troops of the German 15th Army in 1944. It was the first of many conflicts on and around Walcheren Island during the Scheldt battles. It was also the second battle fought over a terrain feature known as the Sloedam during the Second World War.

== Background ==
After the break-out from Normandy by the Allied armies, beginning August 13, 1944, the German forces held on stubbornly to the French and Belgian English Channel ports. This forced the Allies to bring all supplies for their rapidly advancing armies from the artificial harbour they had constructed off the beaches of Normandy, and from Cherbourg. Because of its port capacity Antwerp became the immediate objective of the British 21st Army Group commanded by Field Marshal Bernard Montgomery. While Antwerp fell to Montgomery on September 4 no supplies could be landed there until the German forces holding the lower reaches of the Scheldt, between Antwerp and the North Sea, were removed.

=== Terrain ===
A feature known as the Sloe Channel separated the island of Walcheren from the South Beveland isthmus. A narrow causeway connected the two, known to the Dutch as the Sloedam (it literally dammed the Sloe Channel) and in English as the Walcheren Causeway. The causeway carried a rail line from the mainland onto the island and to the port of Vlissingen (or Flushing, as it was known in English). A paved road also ran the length of the causeway, which was about 40 metres (130 ft) wide and a kilometre (0.6 mile) long. On either side of this causeway, which was elevated only a few metres (feet) above sea level, marsh, mud-flats and deep water all hindered movement between Walcheren and South Beveland.

== Prelude ==
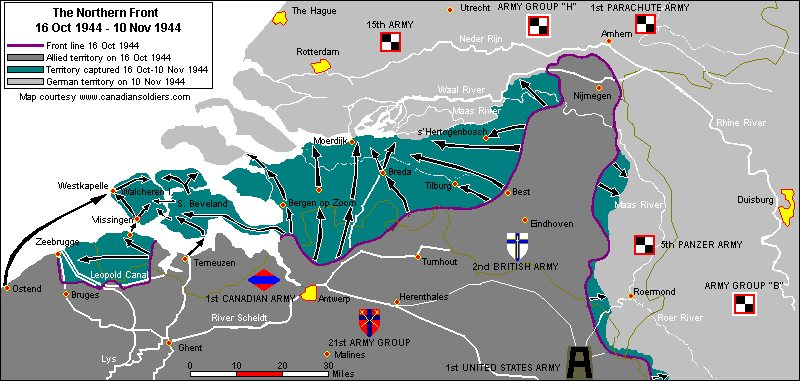
Map of the northern front, 1944

The Allies had to secure a port of the capacity of Antwerp before they could contemplate the invasion of Germany. By 31 October 1944, all land surrounding the Scheldt estuary had been cleared of German control except for Walcheren Island, from where coastal batteries commanded the approaches to the waterway. These guns prevented the Allies from making use of the port facilities of Antwerp to alleviate their supply difficulties. The island's dykes had been breached by attacks from RAF Bomber Command: on 3 October at Westkapelle, with severe loss of civilian life; on 7 October at two places, west and east of Vlissingen; and on 11 October at Veere. This flooded the central part of the island, forcing the German defenders onto the high ground around the outside and in the towns.

The 2nd Canadian Infantry Division had marched westwards down the South Beveland isthmus and by 31 October had cleared all German opposition from South Beveland. Walcheren Island was connected to South Beveland by a narrow causeway, 40 m × 1,600 m (130 ft × 5,250 ft) long. Plans to employ assault boats over the Sloe Channel were thwarted by muddy conditions unsuitable for water craft. The Calgary Highlanders had been selected for this amphibious operation, as they had received stormboat training in the UK in anticipation of an opposed water crossing of the Seine River, which invasion planners had predicted would be necessary approximately 90 days after the landings in Normandy. In the event, the ground was too boggy to employ the boats and the Highlanders were used as conventional infantry in a landward attack directly over the causeway.

== Battle ==
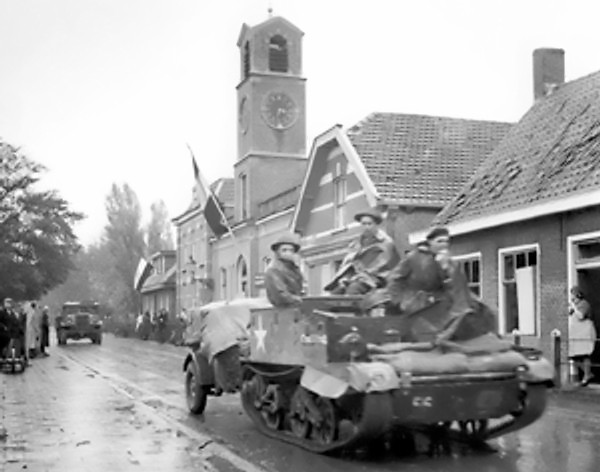
Royal Hamilton Light Infantry carriers move through Krabbendijke

"C" Company of The Black Watch (Royal Highland Regiment) of Canada suffered many casualties on the afternoon and evening of 31 October 1944 trying to "bounce" the Causeway. During their attack, the existence of a deep crater on the causeway was discovered; this crater had been blown by German engineers as an anti-tank obstacle. It was later used by the Canadians as a company command post during the battle.

"B" Company of The Calgary Highlanders were ordered forward just before midnight and were similarly stopped halfway down the causeway. A new fire plan was drawn up and "D" Company (Major Bruce McKenzie) inched forward under intense gunfire, reaching the west end, and securing it, at dawn on 1 November.

The Germans conducted determined counter-attacks, that included the use of flame weapons on the Canadians. At one point, all Calgary Highlander officers in one company were wounded or killed, and the brigade major, George Hees took command of a company.

Company Sergeant Major "Blackie" Laloge of the Calgary Highlanders was awarded the Distinguished Conduct Medal for his actions at Walcheren Causeway, at one point throwing back German hand grenades before they could explode among his men.

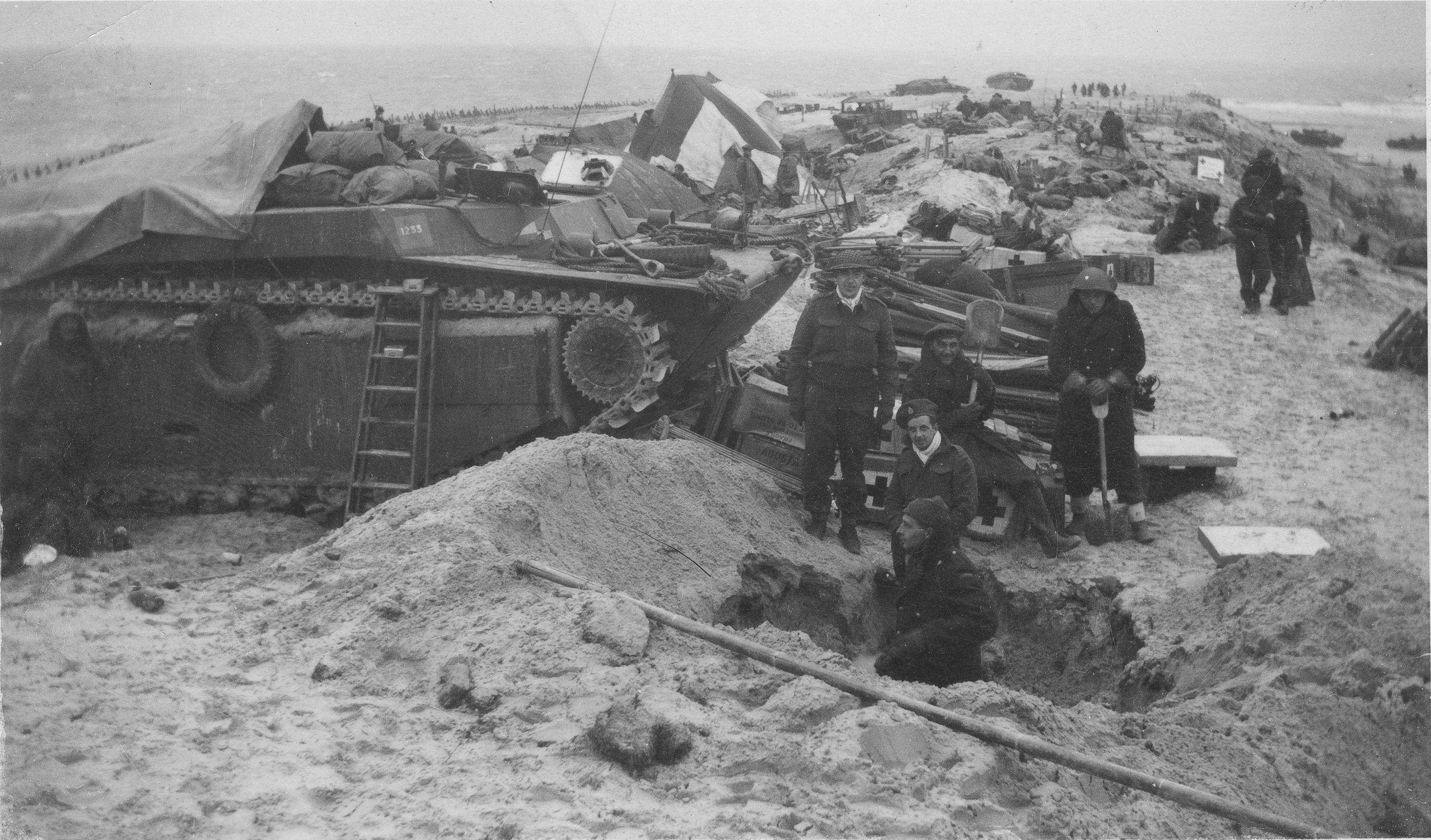
Canadian combat medics constructing a field hospital on the Walcheren beach, November 1944

Two platoons of Le Régiment de Maisonneuve took over the bridgehead on Walcheren Island on 2 November, but were forced back onto the Causeway. A battalion of Glasgow Highlanders were ordered to pass through, but they also were unable to expand the bridgehead on the island.

== Aftermath ==
=== Analysis ===
Landings by British Commandos of the 4th Commando Brigade eventually sealed the fate of the German defenders on Walcheren Island, attacking from seaward at Vlissingen and Westkapelle. The battle for the causeway itself had been a costly and ultimately unnecessary diversion.

=== Casualties ===
The 2nd Canadian Infantry Division went into reserve in the first week of November, moving into the Nijmegen Salient for the winter. The Calgary Highlanders suffered 64 casualties in the three days of fighting at Walcheren Causeway. Le Régiment de Maisonneuve had one man killed and 10 wounded. The Black Watch suffered 85 casualties in the period 14 October to 1 November 1944, the bulk of them suffered on the causeway.

== Legacy ==
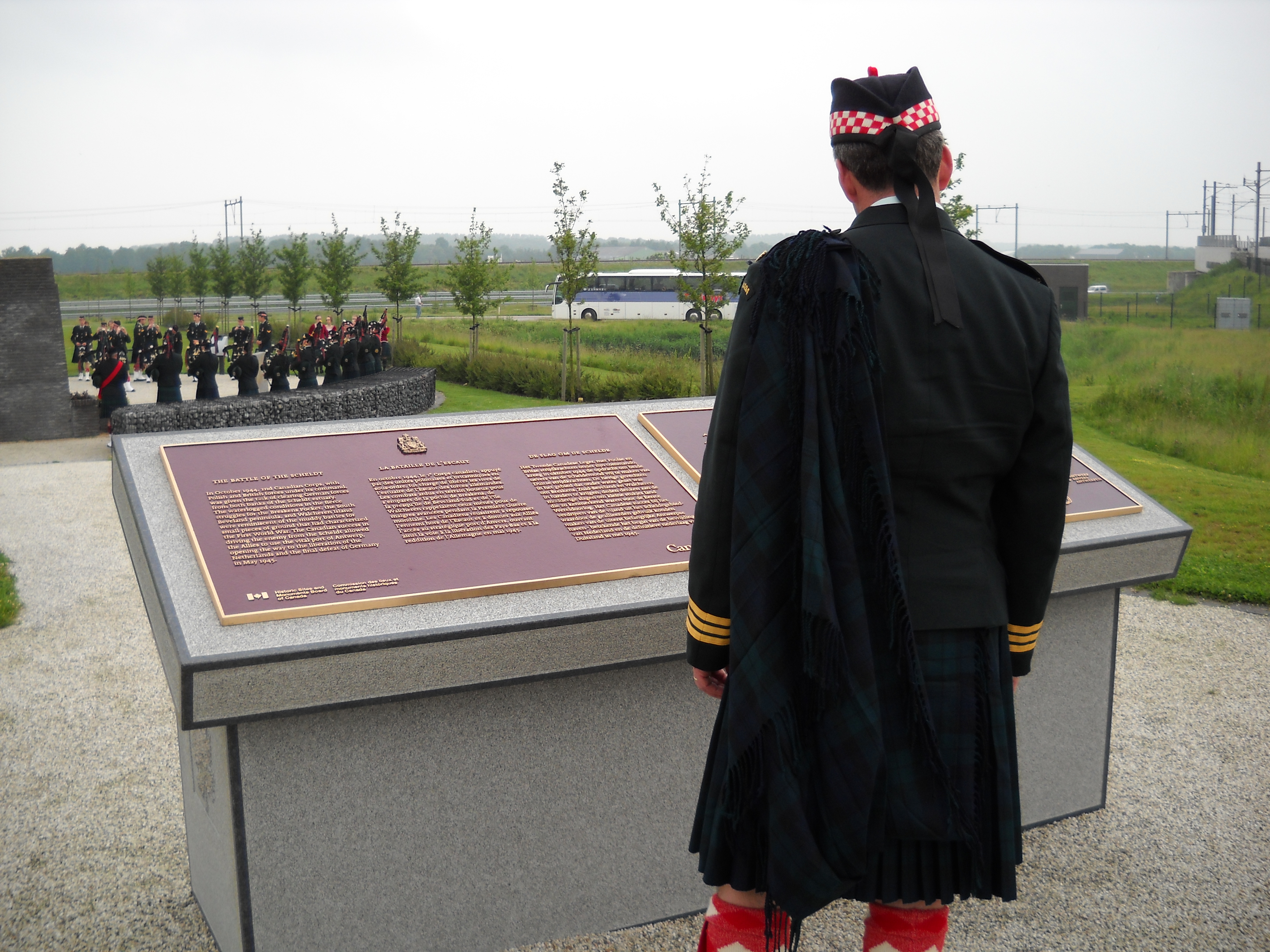
Lieutenant Colonel Mike Vernon, CD, Commanding Officer of The Calgary Highlanders, ponders the monument to the 5th Canadian Infantry Brigade (GPS: 51.502181, 3.705059)

- The Battle of Walcheren Causeway is commemorated annually by The Calgary Highlanders and Regimental Pipes and Drums with a parade and church service on the Wednesday night or weekend closest to the anniversary of the battle. Representatives and members of the local Dutch community in Calgary are usually invited to attend the service. The battle was selected from among the Regiment's twenty Second World War battle honours as being most representative of the spirit of determination displayed by the unit's forerunners, the 10th Battalion, CEF, whose counterattack at St. Julien during the Second Battle of Ypres is also commemorated annually by the Regiment.
- A permanent monument was erected at the causeway and dedicated in the 1980s. The causeway no longer exists as such; land on both sides of the former railway embankment has been reclaimed and the Sloe Channel is now farmland. Remnants of German concrete fortifications are extant on Walcheren Island and South Beveland.
- In the 21st century, the monuments were moved due to rail and road building. A large monument to the French troops that fought a battle there in May 1940 predominates, overlooking memorials to the 52nd (Lowland) Infantry Division and the 5th Canadian Infantry Brigade who fought there in the autumn of 1944.
- The assault on Walcheren Causeway is depicted in the 2020 Dutch film The Forgotten Battle.

== Other battles ==
Brief fighting had occurred in the vicinity of the causeway and Arnemuiden in May 1940 during the German invasion of the Netherlands.

== Bibliography ==
- Copp, Terry, The Brigade.
