= Calgary Highlanders =

Canadian infantry regiment

The Calgary Highlanders (10th Canadians)
- Badge
- Active: 1910–present
- Country: Canada
- Branch: Canadian Army
- Type: Line Infantry
- Role: Light infantry
- Size: One battalion
- Part of: 41 Canadian Brigade Group
- Garrison/HQ: Mewata Armoury
- Motto: Airaghardt (Scottish Gaelic for 'onward')
- Colours: Scarlet with yellow facings (full dress and mess dress)
- March: "The Highland Laddie" and "Blue Bonnets Over the Border"
- Anniversaries: 1 April (regimental birthday); 22 April (St. Julien's Day); 31 October Walcheren Causeway
- Engagements: First World War; St. Julien; Second World War; Walcheren Causeway; War in Afghanistan
- Decorations: Canadian Forces' Unit Commendation
- Battle honours: See § Battle honours
- Website: calgaryhighlanders.com

Commanders
- Colonel-in-Chief: Vacant
- Brian Parker Honorary Colonel: LCol Michael MacKillop, MMV, MSM, CD
- Notable commanders: Colonel J. Fred Scott; Lieutenant-Colonel Mark Tennant; Lieutenant-Colonel Simon Cox

Insignia
- Tartan: Government tartan
- Abbreviation: Calg Highrs

The Calgary Highlanders (10th Canadians) is a Primary Reserve infantry regiment of the Canadian Army, based at Mewata Armouries in Calgary, Alberta. It forms part of 41 Canadian Brigade Group, itself part of 2nd Canadian Division.

The regiment perpetuates the 10th Battalion, Canadian Expeditionary Force (CEF) and maintains several traditions associated with its First World War service. These include an honorary distinction commemorating the counterattack at Kitcheners' Wood in April 1915.) On 9 January 2015, the regiment was recognized with the Canadian Forces' Unit Commendation for outstanding contributions to the war in Afghanistan.

== Badge ==
The badge is based on that worn by the 10th Battalion, CEF, which the regiment perpetuates. Significantly, St. Andrew's Cross has been added to the design (this is not a representation of the Roman numeral ten as is often erroneously reported).

The crown is of the reigning monarch; the Tudor Crown was used from the introduction of this badge until 1953, and the ascension of Queen Elizabeth II. The crown was then changed to St. Edward's Crown. These are sometimes referred to as "King's" and "Queen's" Crowns. In 2026 the Canadian Armed Forces announced that the Canadian Royal Crown will be progressively transitioned onto regimental insignia as the perpetual representation of the Sovereign's authority in Canada regardless of the reigning monarch. No timeline for when the Calgary Highlanders will conform to the new standard has been made public.

The beaver and maple leaves represent Canada, and the scrolls bearing thistles represent Scotland. The City of Calgary grew out of Fort Calgary, established in 1875 and so named by Colonel James Macleod after Calgary, Mull, Scotland, a location near his sister's home.

The badge appears not only as a cap badge, but is also seen on the regiment's drums, as well as the drum major's sash and regimental pipe banners.

== Lineage ==
The camp flag of The Calgary Highlanders.

On 1 April 1910 the regiment was raised as the 103rd Regiment "Calgary Rifles". In 1914 the 103rd contributed men to several battalions of the Canadian Expeditionary Force and the Highlanders officially perpetuate the 10th Battalion, CEF, 56th Battalion (Calgary), CEF and 82nd Battalion, CEF. The 103rd Regiment was reorganized on 15 March 1920 as two separate regiments, The Alberta Regiment (now The South Alberta Light Horse) and The Calgary Regiment as part of the Otter Committee reorganizations. On 15 May 1924 The Calgary Regiment was again reorganized and split into two separate regiments, The Calgary Regiment (now The King's Own Calgary Regiment) and The Calgary Highlanders. On 15 September 1921 The Calgary Regiment divided into six battalions, the 1st Battalion became the 1st Battalion, Calgary Highlanders, The Calgary Regiment. The 2nd Battalion, The Calgary Regiment later became the King's Own Calgary Regiment. The 3rd, 4th and 5th battalions were paper units that were never formed; they disbanded in the 1936 reorganizations of the Militia. On 15 May 1924, The Calgary Regiment reorganized as separate regiments.

- Originated 1 April 1910 as the 103rd Regiment "Calgary Rifles"
- Reorganized 15 March 1920 as two separate regiments, The Alberta Regiment (now The South Alberta Light Horse) and The Calgary Regiment
- 1st Battalion of The Calgary Regiment redesignated as 1st Battalion, Calgary Highlanders, The Calgary Regiment
- Reorganized 15 May 1924 as two separate regiments, The Calgary Regiment (now The King's Own Calgary Regiment) and The Calgary Highlanders
- Redesignated 7 November 1940 as the 2nd (Reserve) Battalion, The Calgary Highlanders
- Redesignated 15 December 1945 as The Calgary Highlanders
- Redesignated 21 March 2024 as The Calgary Highlanders (10th Canadians)

== History ==
=== 1910–1914 ===
The regiment dates back to 1 April 1910 and the creation of the 103rd Regiment (Calgary Rifles), under the command of Lieutenant-Colonel William Armstrong. The regiment did not mobilize for the First World War; however, the 103rd Regiment contributed men to several overseas battalions of the Canadian Expeditionary Force beginning in 1914, including the 10th Battalion.

=== First World War ===
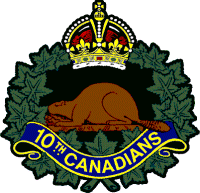
Cap badge of the 10th Battalion, C.E.F.

Details of the 103rd Regiment "Calgary Rifles" were called out on active service on 6 August 1914 for local protection duties, but did not mobilize for overseas service. Individual officers and soldiers of the 103rd were employed as internment camp staff and guards at Banff as well as Cave and Basin until 1917. The regiment remained a part time Militia unit throughout the war.

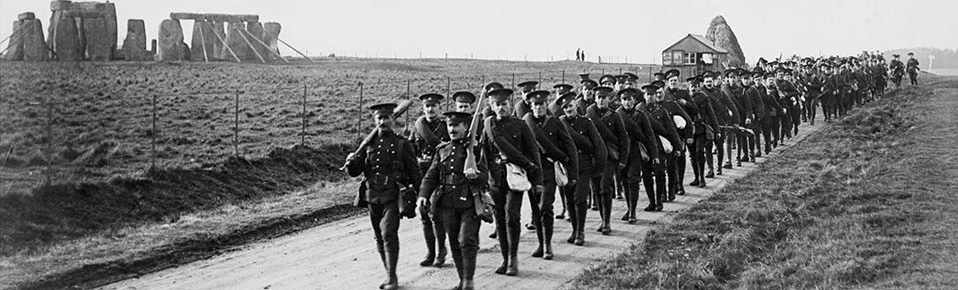
Men of the 10th Battalion pass Stonehenge

The 10th Battalion (Canadians), CEF was authorized on 10 August 1914 and embarked for Britain on 29 September 1914. It disembarked in France on 14 February 1915, where it fought as part of the 2nd Canadian Infantry Brigade, 1st Canadian Division in France and Flanders until the end of the war. The battalion disbanded on 30 August 1920.

The 56th Battalion (Calgary), CEF was authorized on 7 November 1914 and embarked for Britain on 20 March 1916. There it provided reinforcements for the Canadian Corps in the field until 6 July 1916, when its personnel were absorbed by the 9th Reserve Battalion, CEF. The battalion disbanded on 15 September 1917.

The 82nd Battalion, CEF was authorized on 10 July 1915 and embarked for Britain on 20 May 1916. There it provided reinforcements for the Canadian Corps in the field until 18 July 1916, when its personnel were absorbed by the 9th Reserve Battalion, CEF. The battalion disbanded on 21 May 1917.

The Calgary Highlanders perpetuate all three battalions.

=== Interwar Period ===
In 1921, the Canadian Militia was reorganized and the 103rd Regiment became simply "The Calgary Regiment". The 1st Battalion of this new unit became known as the Calgary Highlanders. The regiment was permitted to perpetuate the history of the 10th Battalion, CEF, and inherited that units battle honours (granted in 1929) as well as inheriting the memory of two Victoria Cross holders, Acting Sergeant Arthur George Knight and Private Harry W. Brown, both of whom were awarded the VC posthumously in the last year and a half of the Great War.

The process for awarding battle honours for the First World War took over a decade, and The Calgary Highlanders were first awarded battle honours for the actions of the 10th Battalion, CEF, on 15 September 1929.

The official granting of battle honours to the 10th Battalion was not done until 15 October of the same year. There was also one minor change; while the Calgary Highlanders were granted "Arras, 1917, '18" as a battle honour, the 10th Battalion's honour read only "Arras, 1917."

While the overall battle of Saint-Julien was considered worthy of a battle honour, to the dismay of those regiments perpetuating the units involved, the counter-attack at Kitcheners' Wood was not. This counterattack, 22 April 1915, was thrown into the first German gas attack of the war. In recognition of this gallant effort and the persistence of the Winnipeg Light Infantry, the Calgary Highlanders and the Canadian Scottish, a special 'honorary distinction' was granted by Order in Council No. 10, 1934, of a special oak leaf shoulder badge now unique in the Canadian armed forces, and worn only by those three regiments at the time of adoption in 1938, and today by only two units, The Calgary Highlanders and The Canadian Scottish Regiment (Princess Mary's).

=== Second World War ===
The regiment mobilized for active service as The Calgary Highlanders, Canadian Active Service Force (CASF) on 1 September 1939. The regiment trained in Calgary until the summer of 1940 when it departed for Camp Shilo, Manitoba.

==== 1st Battalion ====
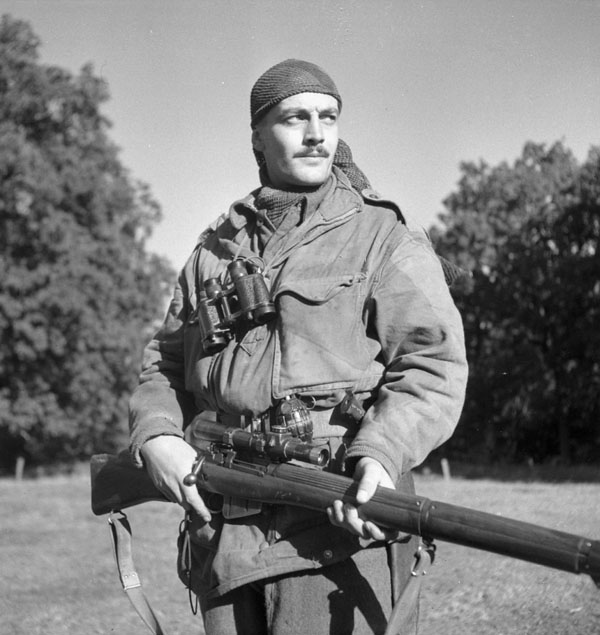
One of the most widely reproduced Canadian photographs of the Second World War. Sergeant Harold Marshall, of the Calgary Highlanders Scout and Sniper Platoon, posed for Army photographer Ken Bell near Fort Brasschaet [nl] in Belgium, September 1944. (PAC)

On 27 August 1940, The Calgary Highlanders, CASF (Canadian Active Service Force) moved with the Second Canadian Division to Britain. In September 1940, the 1st Battalion arrived in England. The Calgary Highlanders, CASF, was re-designated as the 1st Battalion, The Calgary Highlanders on 7 November 1940. The Calgary Highlanders pioneered battle drill for the Canadian Army, which was a realistic system of training infantry for the hardships of modern war. They themselves learned battle drill from the British 47th Division.

The battalion's mortar platoon took part in the Dieppe Raid on 19 August 1942. The mortar platoon commanded by Lieutenant FJ Reynolds was attached to the 5th Canadian Infantry Brigade but stayed offshore during the raid. Sergeants Lyster and Pittaway were decorated with a Mention in Despatches for their part in shooting down two German aircraft during the raid, and one officer of the regiment was killed while ashore with a brigade headquarters.

On 6 July 1944, one month after the Normandy landings, the regiment landed in France as part of the 5th Canadian Infantry Brigade, 2nd Canadian Infantry Division, and it continued to fight in North-West Europe until the end of the war. In Operation Spring, the Calgary Highlanders were part of the Battle of Verrières Ridge, along with the Black Watch, in which the regiment took heavy casualties. The battalion's worst day of casualties was 1 August 1944 during the assault on Tilly, part of the fighting for Verrières Ridge. The Highlanders suffered 34 killed and 97 wounded, including 2 company commanders, in a 24-hour period. The unit saw extensive action in Normandy, marched through Dieppe with the 2nd Division in September 1944 as liberators, then moved on to the fighting for the Channel Ports. By the end of September the regiment was in Belgium and forced a crossing of the Albert Canal, northeast of Antwerp.

The regiment saw extensive fighting in the Netherlands in October 1944, opening the way to South Beveland, and then west to the Walcheren Island Causeway where the brigade fought an extended battle beginning on Hallowe'en night.

From November to February 1945 the regiment wintered in the Nijmegen Salient, then was back in action in the Rhineland fighting, clearing the last approaches to the River Rhine itself. Fighting resumed on the far bank in March, and city fighting in Doetinchem and Groningen followed. The regiment ended the war on VE Day on German soil.

The Victory Campaign had cost The Calgary Highlanders over 400 men killed, from a war establishment of just over 800 men. Several times that many were wounded in action.

Sergeant Clarence "Ken" Crockett, DCM, of the 1st Battalion, Calgary Highlanders, was nominated for the Victoria Cross for actions in September 1944 and instead received the Distinguished Conduct Medal. The regiment selected the Battle of Walcheren Causeway for annual commemoration after the war. The 1st Battalion disbanded on 15 December 1945.

Gallantry and leadership awards
Award	Number
Distinguished Service Order	5
Military Cross	2
Distinguished Conduct Medal	7
Military Medal	15
Mentioned in Dispatches	13
Foreign Awards (Belgian, French, etc.)	13

==== 2nd Battalion ====
The Calgary Highlanders Depot, CASF, was renamed the 2nd Battalion, Calgary Highlanders in 1940 and remained in Calgary for part-time service throughout the war. In December 1945, the 2nd Battalion was redesignated simply "The Calgary Highlanders" once more.

=== Post War ===
The Calgary Highlanders continued to train infantry soldiers in the late 1940s and into the 1950s. In the 1960s, as nuclear tensions mounted between the United States and the Soviet Union, Militia units in Canada moved away from warfighting roles into national disaster training, a role not very well liked. By the 1970s, the Militia had once again focussed its training activities on war fighting.

In the 1980s, the regiment trained as mechanized infantry using the Grizzly Infantry Fighting Vehicle. Militiamen and even army cadets were routinely flown to NATO exercises in Germany, Norway and Alaska to participate in realistic training, as the perceived threat of Warsaw Pact military aggression was felt to be high. After the fall of the Berlin Wall and the end of the Cold War, the emphasis on training throughout Force Mobile Command moved away from large-scale armoured formations fighting Soviet tank formations in central Europe. The Grizzlies were withdrawn by the mid-1990s and the regiment resumed training in a light infantry role.

Most significantly, The Calgary Highlanders have contributed hundreds of soldiers to peacekeeping missions in the years since 1945, including peacekeeping, peace enforcing, and observation missions in Cambodia, the Persian Gulf, the Middle East, the former Yugoslavia, and Sudan. Recently, they have contributed soldiers to the Canadian mission in Afghanistan, including the deployment in early 2008 of 55 soldiers.

=== Presentation of colours 1990 ===
On 30 June 1990, Queen Elizabeth II presented the unit with a new queen's colour at a Trooping the Colour ceremony held at McMahon Stadium in Calgary. The King's Own Calgary Regiment (RCAC), who shared the queen with the Calgary Highlanders as colonel-in-chief, was also on parade and performed a mounted march-past with their vehicles. The combined bands of the Calgary Highlanders, the King's Own Calgary Regiment and Princess Patricia's Canadian Light Infantry were also on parade.

The largest peacetime deployment of the regiment occurred during the 2013 Alberta floods when over 100 Calgary Highlanders were mobilized to assist the Calgary Emergency Management Agency with flood relief efforts.

=== Afghanistan ===
To qualify for a battle honour, CF units were required to contribute an aggregate of more than 20% of authorized strength to the various task forces which served in Afghanistan between 2002 and 2014. The regiment contributed over 100% of its strength, and was awarded the Canadian Forces' Unit Commendation for this achievement.

=== 2010 to present ===
The regiment observed its centennial in 2010, an anniversary shared with its sister unit, The King's Own Calgary Regiment, as well as fellow unit in the Calgary garrison, 14 (Calgary) Service Battalion, as well as the Canadian Navy (represented in Calgary by HMCS Tecumseh). The centennial was marked by several unique events, including the last ever military parade at Currie Barracks in Calgary, and an overseas pilgrimage to battlefield sites and places of regimental significance which included the dedication of plaques at Hill 67 and Clair Tison. Also originally part of the centennial events was the announcement of a Calgary Soldiers' Memorial, which was later dedicated on the anniversary of the battle of Vimy Ridge in 2011. In May 2014, the regiment was awarded the Battle Honour "Afghanistan." As part of Canada's role in the Afghanistan War, the regiment deployed over 100 soldiers to the theatre as individual augmentees and on other assignments with the Regular Force, to a total of 126 separate tours of duty. One officer of the regiment was Mentioned in Despatches and others were recognized by commendations. The Regiment was awarded the Battle Honour "Afghanistan" on 9 May 2014. The unit received the Canadian Forces' Unit Commendation on 9 January 2015.

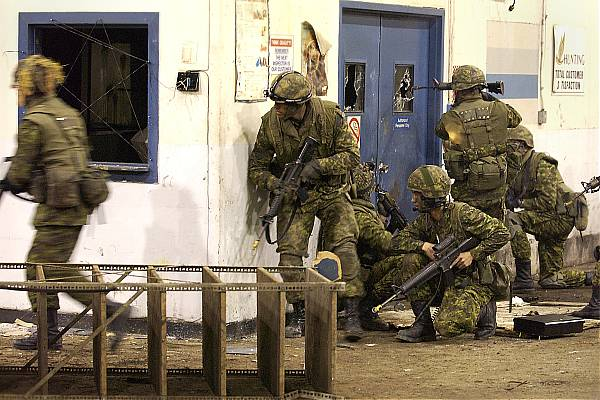
Exercise Black Bear 2004

== Alliances ==
In the mid-1920s, the regiment formed an official alliance with The Argyll and Sutherland Highlanders (Princess Louise's) of the British Army. In 2006, that affiliation officially ended as the Imperial Argylls were absorbed into the Royal Regiment of Scotland as the 5th Battalion. It is unclear if previous affiliations will be permissible between single battalions of the new regiment, or if any future affiliations will be with the regiment as a whole. In either event, all Canadian regiments now affiliated with British regiments scheduled for amalgamation will need to be renewed separately. The 5th Battalion has since been reduced to a single sub-unit called Balaklava Company and used primarily for ceremonial duties.

- United Kingdom – The Argyll and Sutherland Highlanders

== Battle honours ==
Regimental colour of the Calgary Highlanders as presented in 1968. The battle honour Afghanistan has been approved for emblazonment but a new colour has not yet been presented.

Battle honours in bold type indicate honours emblazoned on the regimental colour.

=== First World War ===
- **Ypres, 1915, '17**
- Gravenstafel
- **St. Julien**
- Festubert, 1915
- Mount Sorrel
- **Somme, 1916**
- Thiepval
- Ancre Heights
- Arras, 1917, '18
- **Vimy, 1917**
- **Arleux**
- **Hill 70**
- **Passchendaele**
- **Amiens**
- Scarpe, 1918
- **Drocourt–Quéant**
- **Hindenburg Line**
- Canal du Nord
- Pursuit to Mons
- France and Flanders, 1915–18

Honorary distinction: Oak-leaf shoulder badge for the actions of the 10th "Overseas" Battalion, CEF, at the Battle of Kitcheners' Wood on 22/23 April 1915.

=== Second World War ===
- **Bourguébus Ridge**
- Faubourg de Vaucelles
- **Verrières Ridge–Tilly-la-Campagne**
- **Falaise**
- Falaise Road
- Clair Tizon
- Forêt de la Londe
- **Dunkirk, 1944**
- Wyneghem
- **Antwerp–Turnhout Canal**
- **The Scheldt**
- Woensdrecht
- South Beveland
- **Walcheren Causeway**
- **The Rhineland**
- The Reichswald
- **The Hochwald**
- Xanten
- The Rhine
- **Groningen**
- Oldenburg
- North-West Europe, 1944–1945

=== Southwest Asia ===
- Afghanistan

=== Lineage chart ===
Lineage chart

1910	103rd Regt "Calgary Rifles"
1914	10th Bn, CEF	56th Bn, CEF
1915	82nd "Overseas" Bn, CEF
1916	Absorbed by 9th Reserve Bn	Absorbed by 9th Reserve Bn
1920	Disbanded	1st Bn (50th Bn, CEF), The Calgary Regt	2nd Bn (56th Bn, CEF), The Calgary Regt	3rd Bn (82nd Bn, CEF), (Note: Reserve) The Calgary Regt
1920	1st Bn (10th Bn, CEF), The Calgary Regt	2nd Bn (50th Bn, CEF), The Calgary Regt	3rd Bn (56th Bn, CEF), The Calgary Regt	4th Bn (82nd Bn, CEF), The Calgary Regt
1921	1st Bn (10th Bn, CEF), Calgary Highlanders, The Calgary Regt
1924	1st Bn (10th Bn, CEF), The Calgary Highlanders	The Calgary Regt	2nd Bn (56th Bn, CEF), The Calgary Highlanders	3rd Bn (82nd Bn, CEF), The Calgary Highlanders
1936	The Calgary Highlanders	Disbanded	Disbanded
1939	The Calgary Highlanders, CASF
1940	1st Bn, The Calgary Highlanders, CASF	2nd (Reserve) Bn, The Calgary Highlanders
1945	Disbanded	The Calgary Highlanders
2024	The Calgary Highlanders (10th Canadians)

== Uniform ==
The Calgary Highlanders adopted many dress distinctions of The Argyll and Sutherland Highlanders (Princess Louise's), the allied regiment in Scotland, in the 1920s and continue to cherish those distinctions into the 21st century, including the red and white diced Glengarry worn by all ranks (except pipers), the badger head sporran worn by officers, warrant officers, and senior NCOs, the six-point horsehair sporran worn by junior NCOs (except pipers), and the striped necktie of the 2nd Battalion, The Argyll and Sutherland Highlanders, also worn by officers, warrant officers, senior NCOs, pipers and drummers of The Calgary Highlanders. These distinctions are no longer seen in the British Army since the Argylls were amalgamated into the Royal Regiment of Scotland in 2006.

Headdress

The red and white diced glengarry of the Argylls is worn by all ranks (except pipers, who wear black). In combat dress, the khaki tam o'shanter is worn by junior NCMs with the balmoral worn by senior NCMs and officers. A cap badge in yellow metal is worn by trained privates who are not yet infantry qualified. Infantry qualified junior NCMs wear a bronze cap badge, and senior NCMs, officers, and pipe band musicians all wear a nickel-plated cap badge. Tradesmen wear the badge of their branch, as appropriate.

Ceremonial dress

The theoretical full dress uniform for the regiment would be a scarlet jacket and feather bonnet; this uniform has never been worn in actuality. The regiment did adopt a green coatee in the 1950s, and has retained it as the standard ceremonial uniform; they are worn only by the regimental colour party or by small parties for special occasions (such as weddings, etc.). The Pipes and Drums have always retained full ceremonial band dress, consisting of green doublets for pipers and scarlet doublets with crown lace for drummers. Pipers wear a black cock feather in their glengarries in full dress, with drummers wearing the feather bonnet.

Highland dress

The Government tartan kilt is worn, with pleats arranged in box style according to the pattern worn by the Argylls. Several types of sporran are worn. All ranks wear a brown leather purse when in walking-out dress (i.e. with green Lovat hose); NCMs wear a simpler version with brass stud closure, officers wear a separate pattern with hidden snap fastener. For dress parades (commanding officer's parade dress), corporals and master corporals wear the six-point horsehair sporran while senior NCMs and officers wear a badger head sporran. Pipers wear three-point horsehair sporrans while the pipe major and drum major wear a separate pattern of three-point sporran. Hose tops and diced hose are in red/white dice, with pipers wearing Rob Roy tartan (red/black dice).

Honorary Colonel R.B. Bennett originally outfitted the Pipes and Drums with Royal Stewart tartan kilts and plaids in the 1920s; when the band of the 1st Battalion arrived in England in 1940 they were very quickly informed that Royal Stewart was the prerogative of royal regiments only, and they were to cease wear of that tartan at once. Pipers in the 2nd Battalion (Calgary) continued to wear Royal Stewart tartan until 1947.

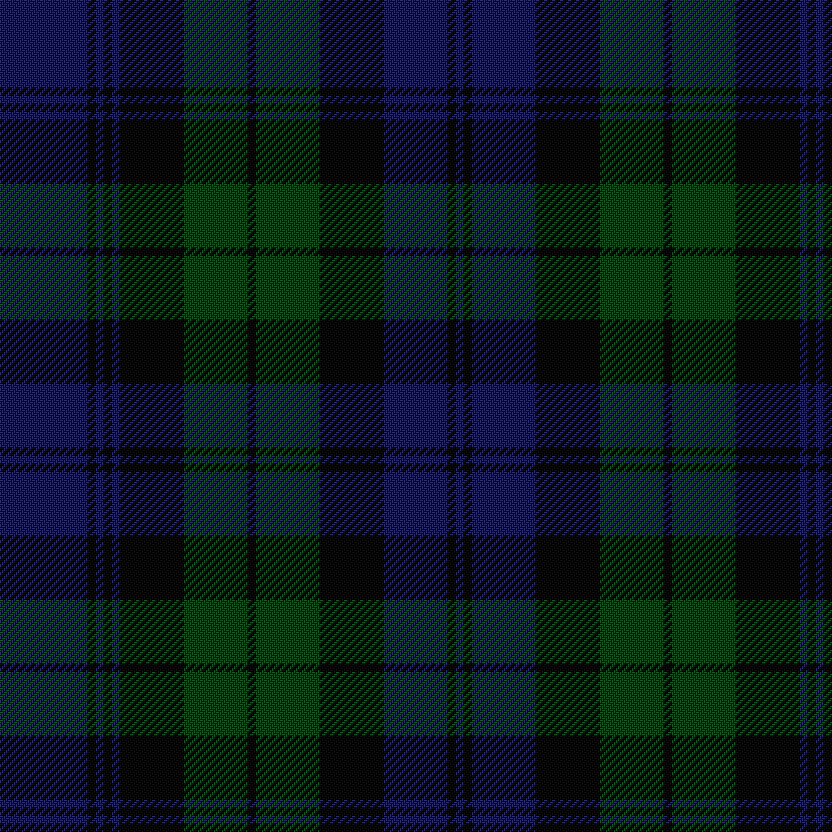
"Government sett", also known as the Black Watch tartan.

Mess dress

Mess dress for officers and senior NCMs is based closely on that worn by the Argylls; Honorary Colonel Mannix approved a new distinctive pattern officers' mess jacket in the 1980s, which featured buttons on a turn-back cuff, which differed from the Argylls pattern.

Combat dress

Other than regimental headdress (when not wearing the CADPAT field cap or helmet), the only distinction a Calgary Highlander has in combat dress are the CALG HIGHRS titles on his slip-ons.

Regimental order

The regiment created its own order, the Clan of the Gallant Canadians, in 1992.

== Traditions ==
The Regimental Birthday is April 1. It was on 1 April 1910 that the 103rd Regiment (Calgary Rifles) was officially founded. The regiment toasts the occasion with Black Velvet and raw oysters, homage to the original toasts offered by the founder, Lieutenant-Colonel W.C.G. Armstrong and his officers in 1910. The weekend closest to April 22 is when St. Julien's Day is formally recognized, commemorating the role of the 10th Battalion in the Battle of St. Julien in 1915. The parade day closest to October 31 commemorates the role of The Calgary Highlanders in the Battle of Walcheren Causeway.

== Regimental association ==
The 10th Battalion Association was merged with The Calgary Highlanders Association in 1956 to become the 10th Battalion Calgary Highlanders Association.

During the Second World War, The Glen was the regimental newspaper of the overseas battalion beginning in September 1939, and The Glen continues to be the regimental journal of the 10th Battalion Calgary Highlanders Association. The Glen is published semi-regularly.

== Notable members ==
- General John de Chastelain, who served two terms as Chief of the Defence Staff, began his military career as a private in the Regimental Pipes and Drums of The Calgary Highlanders. On 30 June 1990, while serving as CDS, he paraded as a piper with the band during the Presentation of Queen's Colour at McMahon Stadium.
- Brigadier-General G.J.P. O'Brien, OMM, MSC, CD, served in the ranks of the Calgary Highlanders from 1976 to 1979, including a tour of duty with UNDOF. He later transferred to 4th Battalion, The Royal Canadian Regiment, where he was commissioned, went on to command the regiment as a lieutenant-colonel, then commanded 31 Canadian Brigade Group, and was appointed Director General Land Reserve in 2006.
- Lieutenant-Colonel J.G. McQueen was the first commander of the Canadian contingent of the First Special Service Force (The Devil's Brigade).
- Lieutenant-Colonel Mark Tennant rose from the rank of private in 1939 to the rank of major in 1944, and commanded the peacetime regiment after the Second World War. He was also appointed honorary lieutenant-colonel. In civilian life he served for many years as an alderman of the City of Calgary. He was admitted to the Order of Canada following his political service.
- Lieutenant Carl Nickle, later Member of Parliament and member of the Order of Canada.
- Four Calgary Highlanders officers served in the CANLOAN project during the Second World War, two were captured at Arnhem, one was killed in Normandy with the Royal Scots, and one became the last CANLOAN to die in action when he was killed with the Argyll and Sutherland Highlanders in April 1945.
- Sergeants Lyster and Pittaway were mentioned in despatches for their part in shooting down two German aircraft during the Dieppe Raid.
- Scruffy Wallace was a piper in The Calgary Highlanders before leaving the CF and becoming a member of Dropkick Murphys.
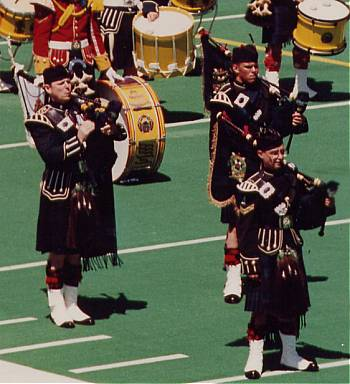
CDS General de Chastelain (left), 30 June 1990

== Regimental monuments ==
As part of the celebrations of the 50th anniversary of VE Day, a special celebrations committee in Doetinchem, Netherlands, recommended that the city park be renamed in honour of Lieutenant-Colonel Mark Tennant and that a monument for the Calgary Highlanders who were killed in the fighting there be established. Tennant distinguished himself during the battle for Doetinchem where the Highlanders fought to clear the city between 1 and 3 April 1945.

As a measure of thanks on the 50th anniversary of the liberation of the Netherlands, the City of Doetinchem named the park "Mark Tennantplantsoen – Een Canadese bevrijder" – "Mark Tennant Park, A Canadian Liberator." Trees in the park still contained shrapnel; mute evidence of the fighting that raged there in April 1945.

The Calgary Soldiers' Memorial bears the names of all Calgary area soldiers who died in war from 1914, with separate sections for both the 10th Battalion, CEF and The Calgary Highlanders.

Regimental plaques can be found at various sites, including Mewata Armouries, Hill 67, Clair Tizon and Loon Plage in Normandy. A plaque to the predecessor unit, the 10th Battalion, can be found at Villers-lès-Cagnicourt, commemorating the Victoria Cross action of Sergeant Arthur Knight, VC.

== Order of precedence ==
Order of precedence
Preceded by The Royal Westminster Regiment	The Calgary Highlanders	Succeeded by Les Fusiliers de Sherbrooke

== Regimental museum ==
The Military Museums

== Film portrayals ==
- The Devil's Brigade (1968). Two main characters can be seen wearing the insignia of the Calgary Highlanders, Corporal Peacock and Private MacDonald (Richard Dawson).
- Legends of the Fall (1994). The character of Samuel Ludlow (Henry Thomas) very clearly wears the insignia of the 10th Battalion, CEF. It is presumed that Tristan Ludlow (Brad Pitt) and Alfred Ludlow (Aidan Quinn) also belong to the same battalion, but neither costume nor dialogue confirm this though a voiceover indicates that all three enlisted together in Calgary.
- Passchendaele (2008). This film project, announced by Paul Gross, filmed in Alberta in the autumn of 2007; Gross depicts a character inspired by his grandfather, Sergeant Michael Dunne, who he claimed served in the 10th Battalion, CEF. The film opened at the Toronto International Film Festival on September 4, 2008, and was released in Canada on October 17, 2008. Historical figures are referenced in the film, for example characters named Colonel Ormond and RSM Watchman are named after living historical counterparts that served with the 10th Battalion.
- The Forgotten Battle (2020). The crossing of the Walcheren Causeway is depicted in this film.

== Associated Army Cadet corps ==
- 2137 RCACC (Calgary Highlanders)
- 3125 Chestermere RCACC (Calgary Highlanders)
- 3016 Airdrie RCACC (Calgary Highlanders)
- 2383 Foothills RCACC (Calgary Highlanders)

== Music ==
- 80 Years of Glory by Calgary Highlanders (Aug 17 1993) Audio CD
- Airaghardt: Onward. (2010) Audio CD

== See also ==
- Canadian-Scottish regiment
- Regimental Pipes and Drums of The Calgary Highlanders
- Eswyn Lyster - warbride author, married to Captain Bill Lyster, Calgary Highlanders
