= Mewata Armoury =

Canadian Forces reserve armoury in Calgary, Canada

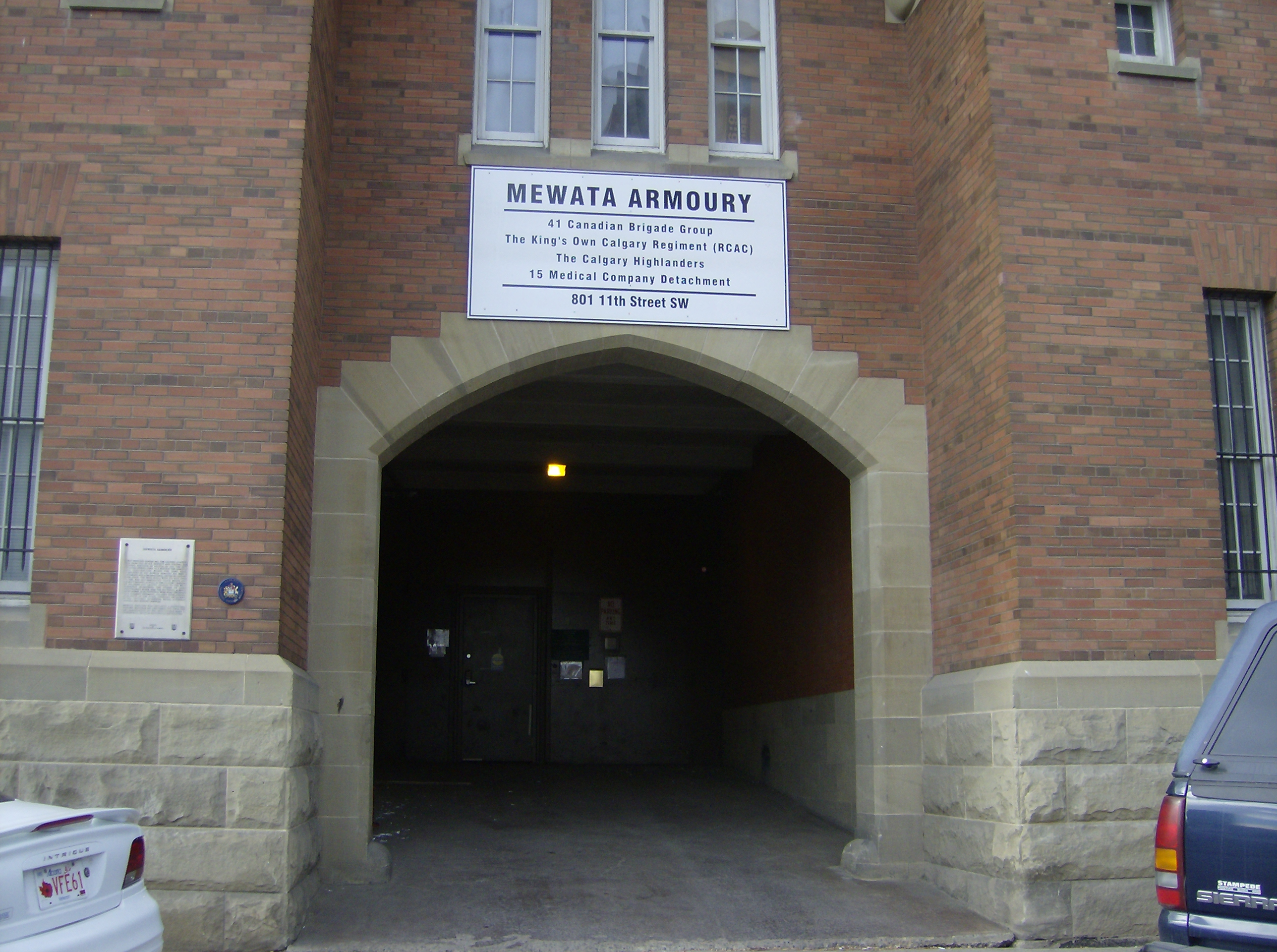
- Armoury entrance
- Interactive map of Mewata Armoury
- 51°02′47″N 114°05′22″W
- Location: 801 11 Street SW, Calgary, Alberta, Canada

History
- Built: 1915–18

Site notes
- Architect(s): Thomas W. Fuller, Dominion Architect
- Website: Mewata Armoury

National Historic Site of Canada
- Official name: Mewata Drill Hall / Calgary Drill Hall National Historic Site of Canada
- Designated: June 22, 1989

Alberta Historic Resources Act
- Official name: Mewata Armoury
- Designated: November 2, 1979

Mewata Armoury is a Canadian Forces reserve armoury in Calgary, Alberta, Canada. Mewata (/məˈwɑːtə/ mə-WAH-tə is derived from the Cree word ᒥᔭᐋᐧᑕᒼ (miyawâtam), meaning "Oh, be joyful".

The building was built between 1915 and 1918 for an original cost of CA$282,051 (equivalent to $5,203,682 in 2025). The building was designed by Thomas W. Fuller (Department of Public Works Architect) and the project was supervised locally by Calgary architect Leo Dowler. The structure was actually built by A. G. Creelman Co. of Vancouver, British Columbia.

The building is at 801 11th Street SW and is home to local Militia units, chiefly The King's Own Calgary Regiment (RCAC) and The Calgary Highlanders (10th Canadians), but also 15 (Edmonton) Field Ambulance Detachment Calgary, the 41 Canadian Brigade Group Influence Activities Company (attached to the King's Own Calgary Regiment) and various cadet organizations.

== History ==
Prior to the construction of the Mewata Armoury, Calgary had minimal military infrastructure in place. A modest two-storey drill hall was opened on 12th Avenue SW in January 1904, the facility was purchased using private funds. In the late 1900s, Calgary City Council passed a motion offering the five lots (hospital site) to the federal government free of charge for the construction of a suitable facility, however, the offer did not materialize. When Lieutenant-Colonel E. A. Cruikshank approached City Council again in 1910 for the hospital site, city officials suggested alternative sites.

The 1911 Canadian federal election, the previous Liberal government under Wilfrid Laurier was toppled by Robert Borden's Conservative Party. Sam Hughes was appointed Minister of Militia and Defence and together Borden and Hughes sought to expand the role and prominence of militias in Canada. By December 1911, Borden had won over Hughes and Frederick Debartzch Monk Minister of Public Works to fund a $250,000 "Western Armoury". In January 1912, Hughes announced in Parliament "towns making offers of valuable sites were most likely to receive favourable consideration of the government." The City of Calgary's land offer valued at approximately $100,000, and in June 1912, the federal government approved $50,000 for the Calgary project.

Mewata Park, originally a federal reserve which was transferred to the City of Calgary as a park in 1906 was chosen for the site. The area was between the city's downtown and growing residential neighbourhoods. Calgary officials expected the federal government to transfer the military's old Calgary Rifle Range in exchange for the Mewata land, however despite correspondence from the city to Borden about the trade, Borden did not press the issue in Ottawa.

In 1913, Borden wrote the city, pressing the issue of the federal government obtaining the Mewata Park land stating:

All Cities are now supplying sites for armories. Calgary offered a site near the old hospital building. It is very unsuitable. If Calgary wants a $50,000 building it can get it by not providing a decent site. If, on the other hand Mewata Park is available, Calgary will obtain an armory that will be second to none in Western Canada.

By 1913 the Mewata Park land had become a civic issue in Calgary, opposed by labour groups which had previously seen the federal government use militia to crush strikes in Cape Breton and Vancouver Island. Calgary Mayor Herbert Arthur Sinnott was reluctant to give away the Mewata Park land, but still sought the construction of an armory. Compounding the issue was the 1902 Crown grant for the Mewata land which stipulated the property must be used for "purposes of a public park and for no other purpose". Eventually Calgary City Council passed a motion for administration to transfer the Mewata land to the federal government, which was strongly opposed by many Calgarians, and the City requested the Legislative Assembly pass a private bill for the purpose of enabling the transfer which was overwhelming defeated by the majority Liberal provincial government. Eventually a plebiscite was held alongside the 1913 Calgary municipal election in which the electorate was asked whether to transfer "a small portion of Mewata Park of approximately 90,000 square feet", in which more than 70% of ratepayers voted in favour of transferring the land. Bennett later respond to Sinnott and the plebiscite noting the total area provided was approximately 10,000 square feet too small, Bennett proposed a solution where the city transferred the full property as requested and the federal government issued an Order in Council absolving the city of any liability in regards to the letters patent.

Construction began September 24, 1915 and according to some sources was held up by lack of bricks. Two brick factories, one in Redcliff and one in Montgomery were built for the specific purpose of providing the bricks to complete the project. The building was completed in 1917. During the Second World War, several wooden huts were built to accommodate the large number of Calgary soldiers mobilized for the Canadian Active Service Force.

In 1939, a large recreation hall was built adjacent to the armouries but the hall burnt down in 1941.

The armoury for a time was home to a Permanent Force squadron of Lord Strathcona's Horse, but is most commonly associated with the Militia units in Calgary. Over the years, several units have been based at Mewata including South Alberta Light Horse, 19th Alberta Dragoons, King's Own Calgary Regiment, the Calgary Highlanders, and 746 (Calgary) Communication Squadron.

During the First World War, Mewata was used as an induction and training centre and a demobilization depot for returning soldiers.

In addition to military uses, other groups and organizations have always used the armoury including a military ball for the Prince of Wales in 1919, the scene of a verbal confrontation between William Aberhart and Major C. H. Douglas founder of Social Credit. The Calgary Police Service and Calgary Fire Department have often used it for training purposes. In 1975, prior to the 63rd Grey Cup parade, twenty marching bands were marshalled in the drill hall.

=== Construction materials ===
The building has a cut stone foundation with a structure of red brick (common bond with steel reinforcement) and sandstone. The drill hall is significant for the large uninterrupted span of its steel trusses. A second story on the west side was added some time after original construction.

=== Architectural style ===
The building was designed in a Tudor/Gothic Revival style. A classic example of armoury design, Mewata has features deliberately bringing to mind a medieval fortress or castle, including four square corner towers, four smaller six sided towers, and buttresses with turrets and a crenellated roofline.

=== Original interior details ===
The original design featured a large central drill hall with 117 rooms (two storeys of soldiers quarters) arranged around its perimeter. The basement included bowling alleys and 30 yard shooting ranges. The facility also included officers' and sergeants' billiard rooms. Barracks have been altered in recent years to serve as offices and storage space. A catwalk around the drill hall has been enclosed on the north and south sides, as well as part of the east side, leaving a short "balcony" overlooking the parade square.

== Heritage Status ==
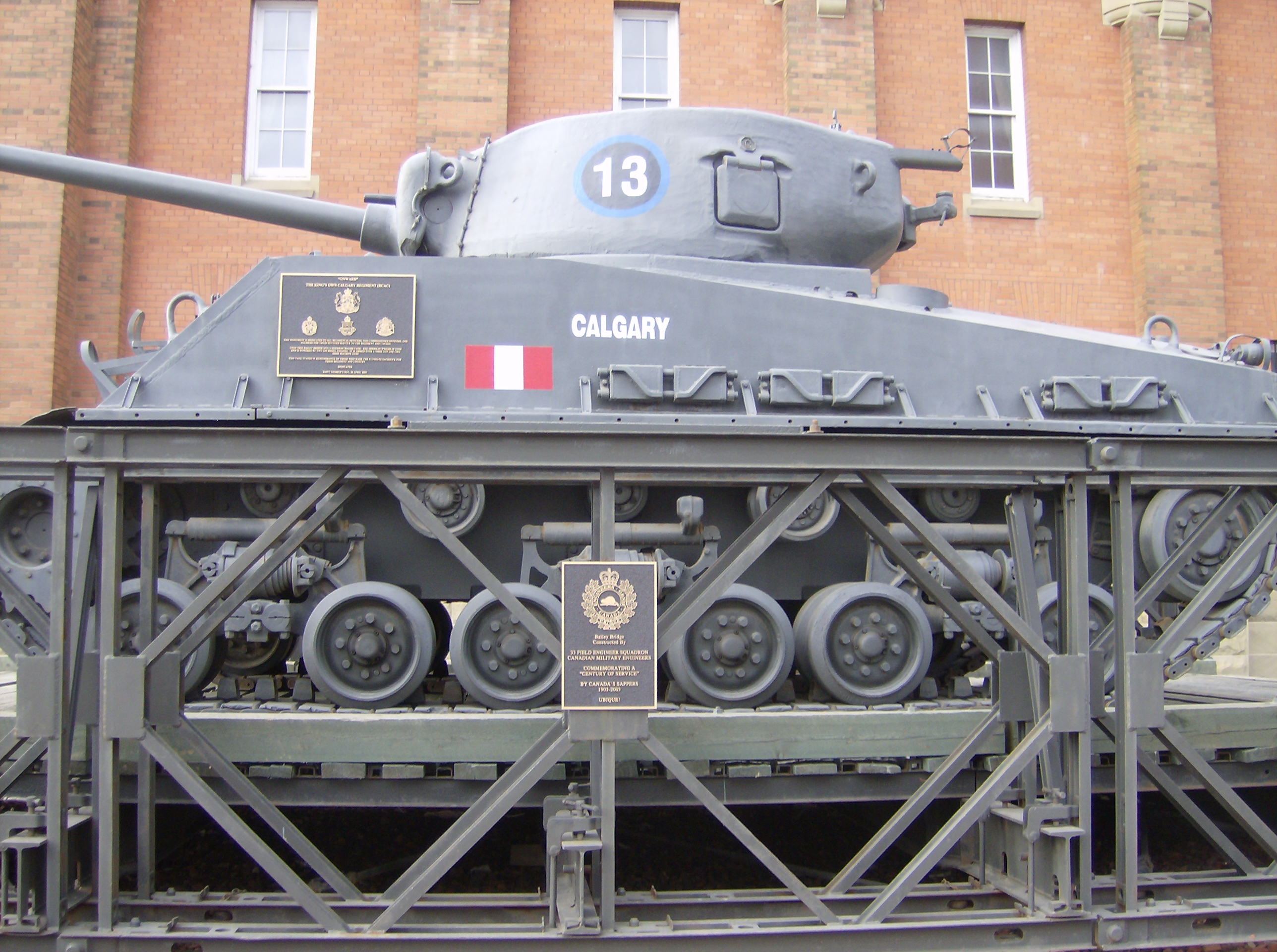
Battery Bridge Monument

On November 11, 1979 the Government of Alberta designated the Mewata Armoury a Provincial Historical Resource, referencing the sites historical significance in providing training facilities for the Dominion Government's armed forces following 1900, and the structure's long-term purpose which did not arise from a specific military emergency. The Minister of Culture Mary LeMessurier and Member of the Legislative Assembly for Calgary-McCall Andy Little announced the Provincial Historical Designation during the Royal Canadian Legion's Remembrance Day ceremonies at the Southern Alberta Jubilee Auditorium.

On November 14, 1984 the Government of Canada recognized the Mewata Armoury as a Federal Heritage Building under Treasury Board Heritage Buildings Policy. The recognition referenced the structures significance due to its historical associations with the Canadian government's late-19th century initiatives to build and maintain militia practice and training areas in urban locations, the building's role in housing militia and permanent forces during inter-war periods, and the substantial role the building played in training efforts for the Second World War. Additionally the Tudor Gothic architectural style, and landmark status in downtown Calgary contributed to the building's significance.

On June 22, 1989 the Government of Canada designated the structure and area a National Historic Site of Canada under the name "Mewata Drill Hall / Calgary Drill Hall National Historic Site of Canada". The designation referenced the site's representation of the third phase of drill hall construction in Canada during 1896 to 1918, the scale and bold design of the armoury following the South African War, and the armoury's role as home of the King's Own Calgary Regiment and the Calgary Highlanders.

The Mewata Armoury was only the fourth site in Calgary to receive the National Historic Site of Canada designation, following Fort Calgary in 1925, Calgary City Hall in 1984, and Heritage Hall in 1987.

=== Plaque ===
The Historic Sites and Monuments Board of Canada plaque at the Mewata Armouries states:

The seale and bold design of the Mewata Armoury exemplify the wave of national pride that greeted Canada’s strong performance in the South African War. In western Canada this military enthusiasm led to a dramatic increase in militia enrolment and resulted in the construction of new drill halls and armouries on an unprecedented scale. Mewata Armoury, one of the largest and most fully equipped of its type, was built in 1917-1918. For many years it has been home to the King’s Own Calgary Regiment and the Calgary Highlanders, both of which were established in 1910.

== Lodger units ==
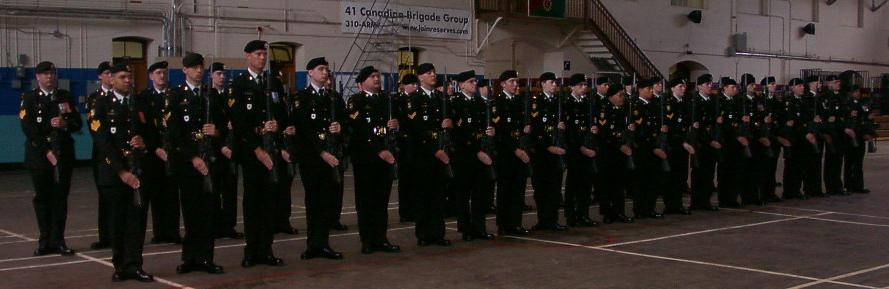
King's Own Calgary Regiment soldiers on parade at Mewata Armoury, 2005.

The armoury is currently home to:

- The King's Own Calgary Regiment (RCAC);
- The Calgary Highlanders (10th Canadians)
- 15 Field Ambulance
- Regimental Pipes and Drums of The Calgary Highlanders (10th Canadians)
- 41 Canadian Brigade Group; 41 Brigade Battle School (South) [formerly Militia Training Detachment Calgary]
- Various cadet units, including 2137 (The Calgary Highlanders) Royal Canadian Army Cadet Corps and 604 "Moose" Squadron, Royal Canadian Air Cadets

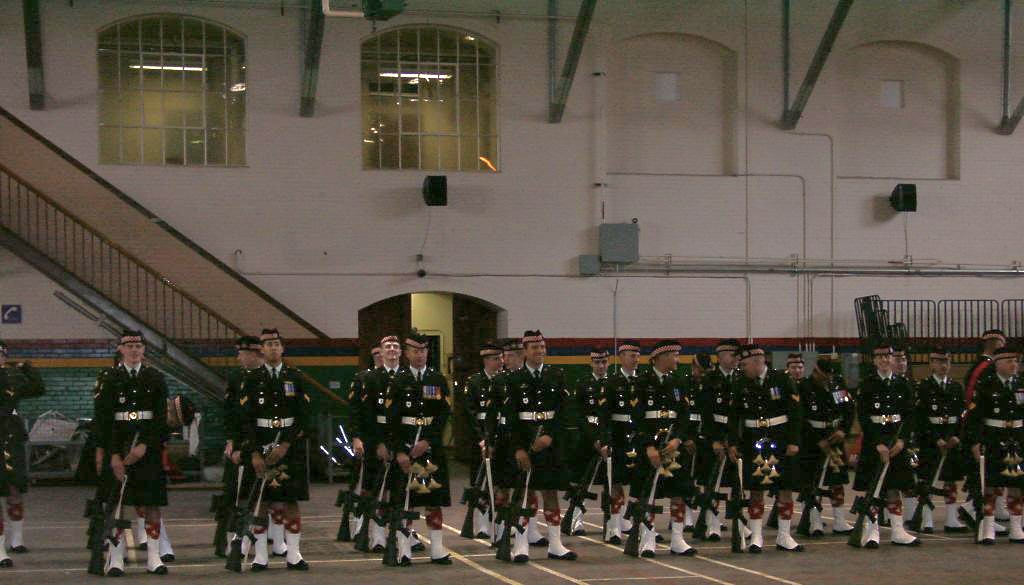
Calgary Highlanders on parade at Mewata Armoury, 2005. The second level of the west side is visible; this entire wing was not part of the additional building and was added later, as were the wooden stairs visible.

== Monuments ==
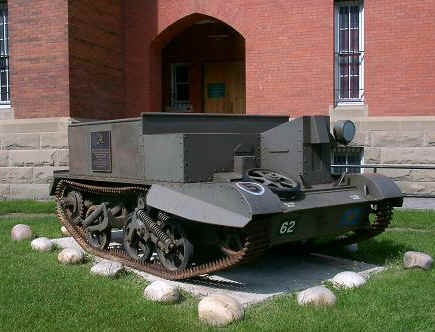
Calgary Highlanders Monument.

The Calgary Highlanders erected and dedicated a Regimental Monument in front of Mewata Armoury in 1998. The monument takes the form of a Universal Carrier, of the type used by the regiment in the Second World War, painted in the markings of the 1st Battalion. A plaque dedicates the memorial to all soldiers of the regiment and its predecessors who have "Served Canada in War and Peace." Regimental Markings included a gold maple leaf on Royal Blue, indicating the 2nd Canadian Infantry Division, and a green square indicating the 5th Brigade, upon which was placed the Unit Sign "62" in white.

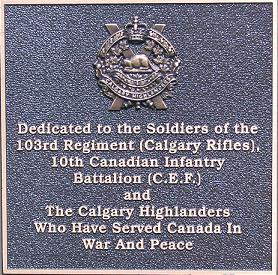
Plaque.

Lieutenant Brian S. King, CD, Curator of the Regimental Museum, received permission from 41 Canadian Brigade Group to place a vehicle in front of Mewata Armoury, after discussions in the Museum in 1997. This form of homage is common in other armouries and military bases across Canada. Lieutenant King sought out collectors in order to obtain an appropriate vehicle, and negotiations with the Canadian War Museum yielded this fully restored carrier, from the collection of Jack Guthrie, a notable Calgary vehicle collector. The concrete pad for the carrier was donated by BURNCO and the plaque purchased by the Regimental Funds Foundation through a grant from the Royal Alberta United Services Institute. The markings were researched and painted by Corporal Michael Dorosh, at that time a clerk with battalion headquarters. The plaque was unveiled by Second World War veterans Sergeant Clarence "Ken" Crockett, DCM and Lance Corporal Floyd Rourke, DCM.

A second monument was later erected in celebration of 100 years of military engineering in Canada. An M4A2E8 Sherman tank displaying the wartime markings of The King's Own Calgary Regiment including the formation sign of the 1st Canadian Armoured Brigade was placed atop a Bailey bridge bearing a plaque dedicated by 33rd Field Engineer Squadron. The KOCR mobilized a tank regiment which served with the brigade at Dieppe and in Italy from 1941 to 1945.

== See also ==
- List of Armouries in Canada
