= Regimental Pipes and Drums of The Calgary Highlanders =

Volunteer pipe band associated with The Calgary Highlanders of the Canadian Forces

Regimental Pipes and Drums of The Calgary Highlanders (10th Canadians)
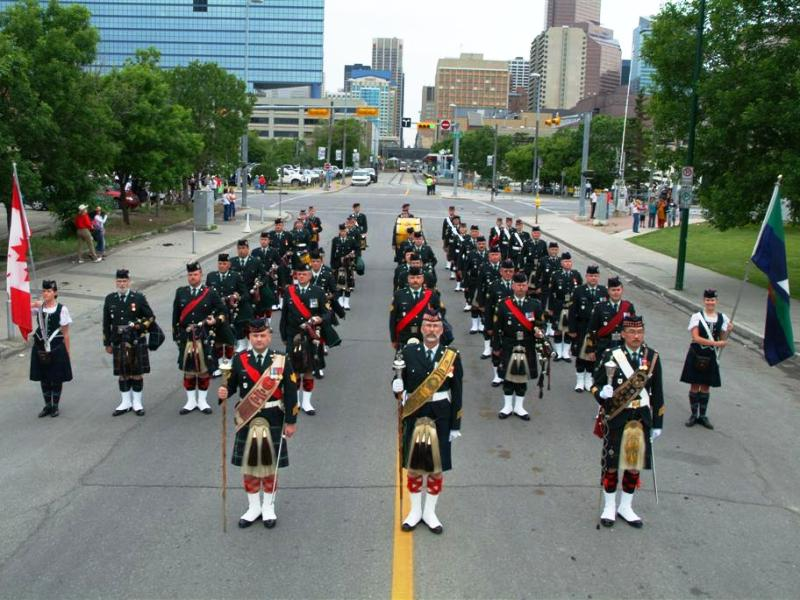
- Location: Calgary, Alberta
- Grade: 4
- Pipe major: Zachary Dwyer
- Drum sergeant: Perry Andress
- Tartan: Government
- Website: Pipe Band website
- Sponsor: Canadian Forces, Calgary Highlanders Regimental Funds Foundation

The Regimental Pipes and Drums of The Calgary Highlanders (10th Canadians) is an authorized volunteer pipe band associated with The Calgary Highlanders (10th Canadians) of the Canadian Forces. For many years, the band was a bona fide, and separate, military unit unto itself, with a separate Unit Identification Code within the CF. Today, the band has been reduced to volunteer status but officially maintains an establishment of eight paid military musicians on its rolls. The band has had mixed success in competitions, but under the direction of Pipe Major Michael Giles had become successful in the Grade Three circuit in Alberta in the years leading up to the regimental centennial in 2010. The band published a recording to commemorate the 80th anniversary of the Regiment in 1990, titled Eighty Years of Glory and commemorated its centennial in 2010 by releasing a second CD entitled Onward.

== History ==
The first pipe band was recruited for the regiment in the early 1920s, drawing on the musical talents in the Calgary area, including many civilian pipers playing with the Calgary Scottish Pipe Band. The band thrived through the donations of interested citizens and fund-raising; interested benefactors including Honorary Colonel R.B. Bennett who donated uniforms to the band in 1923, though the choice of tartan later proved controversial as noted below.

During the Second World War, two pipe bands were in existence, one for each battalion of the regiment. Members of the 1st Battalion Pipe Band were trained soldiers. At Hill 67, pipers were assigned to each of the four rifle companies and played the battalion into their first combat action in Normandy - the only time in the war they were permitted to do so.

In 1945, the Calgary Highlanders reverted to a one-battalion Militia unit again. The Pipes and Drums continued their role of support to regimental functions, recruiting, and after the reorganizations of Unification of the three services in 1968, became a separate unit of the Canadian Forces.

The Pipes and Drums' membership declined in the 1970s, as military service became increasingly unpopular due to the United States involvement in the Vietnam War. The band was officially re-activated in 1975, after having been reduced to nil-strength in 1969. Under the direction of Pipe Major Don Maxwell, the band was rebuilt into a successful competition band, and Maxwell received admittance to the Order of Military Merit in the rank of Member in 1983 for reviving the Pipes and Drums.

The band went into another period of decline following Maxwell's departure to form his own band in the 1980s, concentrating its efforts on regimental functions and street parades and performing poorly in competition. All members were required to complete basic military training, attend military musical courses, and take part in other unit training as deemed fit by the commanding officer. Civilian volunteers were, however, still permitted to augment the band's membership. It was during this time that the band lost access to a dedicated practice space. Officially a lodger unit in the garrison at Mewata Armouries, the band was assigned offices and a large practice room on the second floor. In 1991, the band was relocated to a series of unfinished rooms in the armoury basement, with an abandoned coal storage room expected to serve as a pipe practice room. In the mid-1990s, official funding as a separate unit was cut to military pipe bands throughout Canada, as the end of the Cold War caused a major reassessment of defence spending in NATO countries. The Highlanders were reduced to just two paid positions, with the remaining vacancies being filled by civilian and military volunteers. Several experienced pipers and drummers left the band for other duties within the military.

As a military band, the Pipes and Drums have been recognized for their dress and deportment at civilian competitions as well.

== Uniform ==
The Pipes and Drums erroneously adopted the Royal Stewart tartan in 1923. The drummers switched to Government tartan in 1929 to reflect the regiment's alliance with The Argyll and Sutherland Highlanders. In 1939, the regiment mobilized a battalion for overseas service in the Second World War; eventually two battalions of Calgary Highlanders came into existence, one in Europe and one in Canada, each with its own Pipe Band. The 1st Battalion band in the United Kingdom was told it was not permitted to wear the Royal Stewart tartan; the 2nd Battalion continued to wear the tartan in Calgary. After 1945, the overseas battalion was disbanded, and the one-battalion regiment reverted to having just one band, clad in Government tartan.

Dress regulations have generally followed that of the Argyll and Sutherland Highlanders of the British Army in most respects; in 1992, tartan ribbons were added to the bagpipes to pay homage to both the appointment of Queen Elizabeth II as Colonel-in-Chief of the Regiment (by wearing a Royal Stewart tartan on the front) and the contributions of the Calgary Scottish Pipe Band in the formative years of the band (by adopting Gordon tartan ribbons on the back).

In the 1990s, piper and kilt-maker David Hongisto provided the band with its first white doublets for use as summer full dress; patterned after similar jackets worn by the British Army, this style of uniform had not been employed previously in the band's history.

Less formal orders of dress have generally been a mix of standard military service dress (either battle dress, DEU or shirtsleeves) and Highland dress as appropriate.

== Style ==
The band is properly styled as The Regimental Pipes and Drums of The Calgary Highlanders (10th Canadians). The word "The" is always capitalized when it prefixes "Calgary Highlanders" as it forms part of the proper name of the regiment. An accepted short form is "Pipes and Drums". While reference to "the Band" is usually clearly understood, use of same is officially discouraged because in military parlance, a "band" consists of brass/reed instruments, as distinct from a pipe and drum band. In the 1920s, The Calgary Highlanders in fact did have a brass/reed band in addition to a pipe band; this brass band disappeared before the Second World War.

== Notable public appearances ==
- The Pipes and Drums of the 1st Battalion were active throughout Europe during the Second World War, notably in the many victory parades in 1944–45, for example the triumphant march of the 2nd Canadian Infantry Division through the streets of Dieppe on 3 September 1944.
- The Pipes and Drums appeared in the Nova Scotia International Tattoo in 1988 and the Edinburgh Tattoo in 2000. The band has also performed on a regular basis in smaller festivals, such as tattoos in Lethbridge, Edmonton and Estes Park. Members of the Pipes and Drums formed part of a composite band of Canadian musicians from regiments for whom Queen Elizabeth II is Colonel-in-chief at the 2012 Edinburgh Tattoo, in honour of Her Majesty's Diamond Jubilee.
- The Pipes and Drums are second to the Glenmore Temple Band of the Salvation Army as the longest serving recurring musical act in the Calgary Stampede Parade.

== Schedule ==
The Pipes and Drums have maintained regular attendance at several key events in their annual schedule, including:

- 1 January: musical support to New Year's Levee
- 1 April: Regimental birthday
- 22 April: annual commemoration of the Battle of Kitcheners' Wood
- 1 July: Canada Day
- July: Calgary Stampede Parade
- 31 October: annual commemoration of the Battle of Walcheren Causeway
- 11 November: Remembrance Day
- 25 December: Men's Christmas Dinner

Not all observances are made directly on the dates indicated; as a reserve unit many regimental parades are scheduled for the Wednesday or weekend closest to the date in question instead.

== Notable members ==
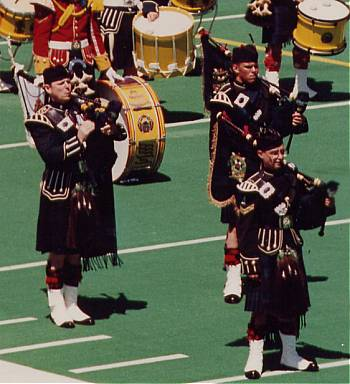
CDS General de Chastelain (left), on parade with the Pipes and Drums on 30 June 1990.

- John de Chastelain began his career as a piper in the Regimental Pipes and Drums. While serving as Chief of the Defence Staff, General De Chastelain performed on parade with the Pipes and Drums as a piper during a Royal Visit in 1990.
- Don Maxwell was awarded the MMM for his service as Pipe Major, a rare award for a military musician; membership in the Order of Military Merit is restricted to one-tenth of one percent of the population of the entire Canadian Forces. His own band, Clan Maxwell, became one of the largest street parade bands in Alberta.
- Peter Hendrickson, currently Drum Sergeant of Alberta Caledonia Pipe Band, began his drumming career in the Calgary Highlanders Pipe Band. Likewise, Lloyd Martens, former drummer for Alberta Caledonia and 1st place scoring bass drummer, began his career in the Calgary Highlanders cadet band and later played for many years in the Regimental Pipes and Drums.
- Neil Sutherland was Pipe Major of the 1st Battalion Pipe Band from 1942 to 1945. As a young piper, he organized a boy's band, and was given permanent custody of the Beatty Trophy at the Banff Games before being asked to return as an adjudicator. In the 1930s he was chief of police in Melfort, Saskatchewan, and was serving in the Winnipeg Police when the Calgary Highlanders were stationed in Shilo, Manitoba. He joined the Pipes and Drums in 1940, was Pipe Major until the end of the war, and returned to Winnipeg where he was Pipe Major of the Winnipeg Police Pipe Band from 1945 to 1970.

== Musical partnerships ==
The Pipes and Drums have formed beneficial, if unofficial, musical partnerships over the years.

- Regimental Bard: Jack Whyte held the position of regimental bard.
- Terence Fullerton

== Legacy ==
The history of the band is preserved in part by displays in The Calgary Highlanders regimental gallery at The Military Museums in Calgary, and archival material related to the band are held by the regimental archives, also at the same location.
