= 82nd Battalion, CEF =

Infantry battalion of the Canadian Expeditionary Force during World War I

82nd "Overseas" Battalion, CEF
- Active: 1915–1916
- Disbanded: 1917
- Country: Canada
- Branch: Canadian Expeditionary Force
- Type: Infantry
- Size: Battalion
- Mobilization headquarters: Calgary
- Battle honours: The Great War, 1916

Commanders
- Commanding officer: Lt.-Col. William Arthur Lowry

The 82nd Battalion, CEF, was an infantry battalion of the Canadian Expeditionary Force during the Great War. The 82nd Battalion was authorized on 10 July 1915 and embarked for Britain on 20 May 1916, where it provided reinforcements for the Canadian Corps in the field. On 18 July 1916, its personnel were absorbed by the 9th Reserve Battalion, CEF. The battalion was subsequently disbanded on 21 May 1917.

The battalion recruited in and was mobilized at Calgary, Alberta.

The battalion was commanded by Lieutenant-Colonel William Arthur Lowry from 5 May 1916 to 18 July 1916.

The battalion was awarded the battle honour The Great War, 1916.

The perpetuation of the 82nd Battalion, CEF, was assigned in 1920 to the 4th Battalion, The Calgary Regiment. When this regiment was split in 1924, the perpetuation went to the 3rd Battalion, The Calgary Highlanders. The Calgary Highlanders continue to perpetuate the 82nd Battalion.

== Sources ==
- Canadian Expeditionary Force 1914–1919 by Col. G.W.L. Nicholson, CD, Queen's Printer, Ottawa, Ontario, 1962
- Dorosh, Michael A. Calgary's Infantry Regiment: A Pictorial History of The Calgary Highlanders (Calgary Highlanders Regimental Funds Foundation, 2024). ISBN 9780969461647
