= Bicentennial Unit Commendation Award =

Bicentennial Unit Commendation Award may refer to:

- Coast Guard Bicentennial Unit Commendation, an award of the United States Coast Guard
- Public Health Service Bicentennial Unit Commendation Award, an award of the United States Public Health Service Commissioned Corps
