= USS Chosin =

Ticonderoga-class cruiser

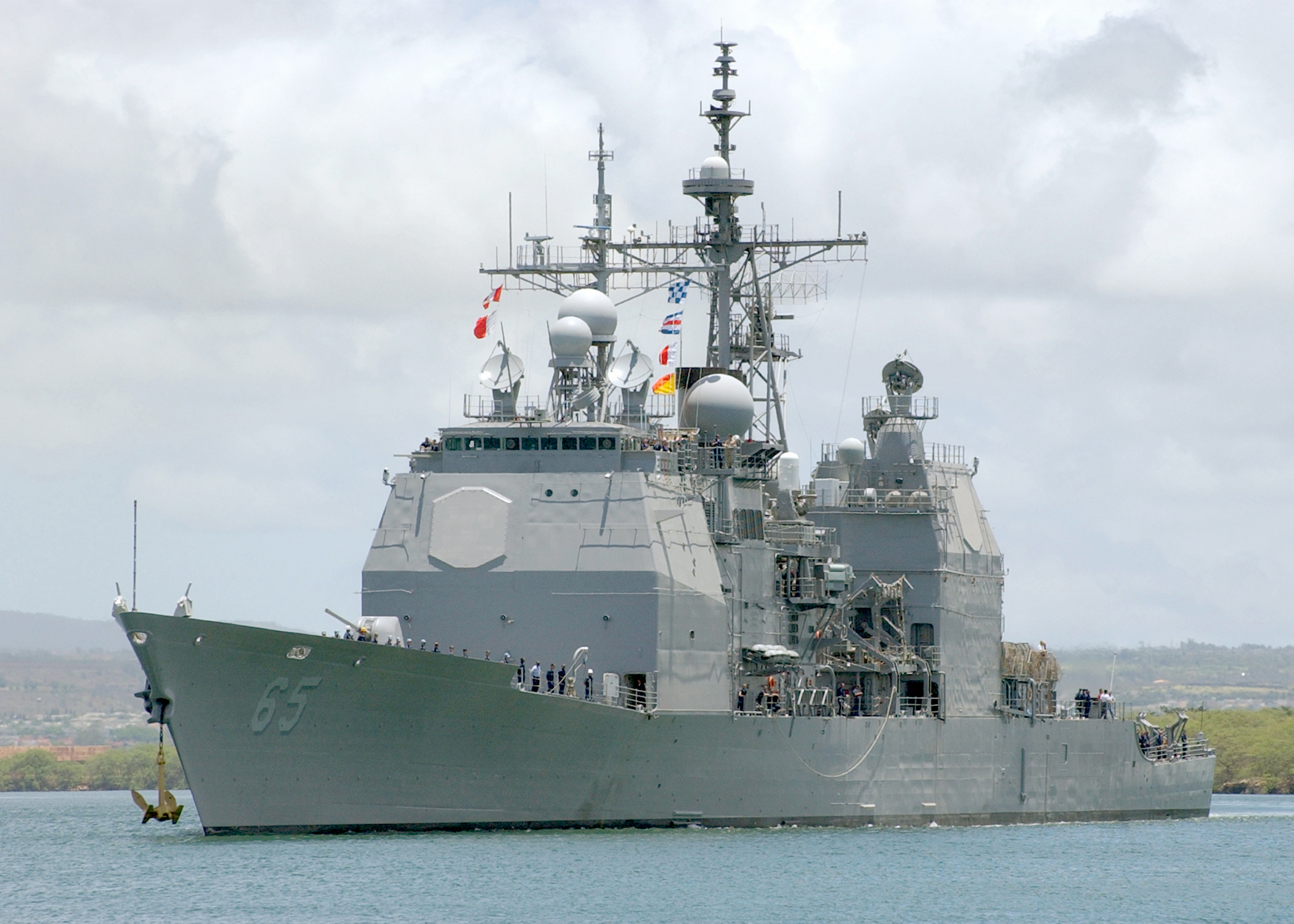
- USS Chosin (CG-65)

History

United States
- Name: Chosin
- Namesake: Battle of Chosin Reservoir
- Ordered: 8 January 1986
- Builder: Ingalls Shipbuilding
- Laid down: 22 July 1988
- Launched: 1 September 1989
- Commissioned: 12 January 1991
- Home port: Naval Base San Diego
- Identification: MMSI number: 366966000; Call sign: NCHO; Hull number: CG-65
- Motto: Invictus
- Status: in active service
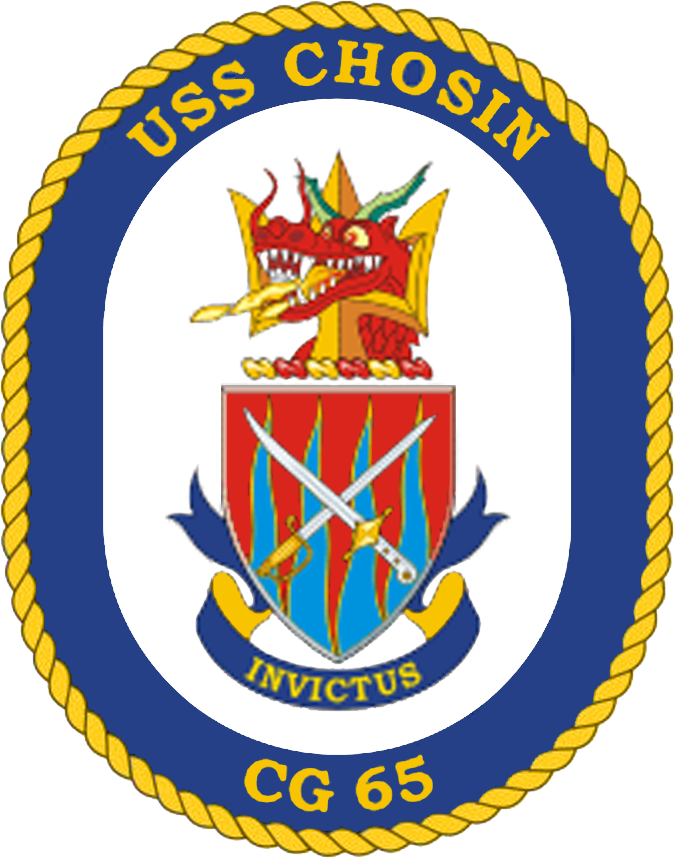
- Badge

General characteristics
- Class & type: Ticonderoga-class guided missile cruiser
- Displacement: Approx. 9,600 long tons (9,800 t) full load
- Length: 567 feet (173 m)
- Beam: 55 feet (16.8 meters)
- Draft: 34 feet (10.2 meters)
- Propulsion: 4 × General Electric LM2500 gas turbine engines; 2 × controllable-reversible pitch propellers; 2 × rudders
- Speed: 32.5 knots (60 km/h; 37.4 mph)
- Complement: 30 officers and 300 enlisted
- Sensors & processing systems: AN/SPY-1A/B multi-function radar; AN/SPS-49 air search radar (Removed on some ships); AN/SPG-62 fire control radar; AN/SPS-73 surface search radar; AN/SPQ-9 gun fire control radar; AN/SQQ-89(V)1/3 - A(V)15 Sonar suite, consisting of: AN/SQS-53B/C/D active sonar; AN/SQR-19 TACTAS, AN/SQR-19B ITASS, & MFTA passive sonar; AN/SQQ-28 light airborne multi-purpose system
- Armament: 2 × 61 cell Mk 41 vertical launch systems containing; 122 × mix of: RIM-66M-5 Standard SM-2MR Block IIIB; RIM-156A SM-2ER Block IV; RIM-161 SM-3; RIM-162A ESSM; RIM-174A Standard ERAM; BGM-109 Tomahawk; RUM-139A VL-ASROC; 8 × RGM-84 Harpoon missiles; 2 × 5 in (127 mm)/62 caliber Mark 45 Mod 4 lightweight gun; 2 × Mk 38 25 mm Machine Gun Systems; 2–4 × .50 in (12.7 mm) cal. machine gun; 2 × Phalanx CIWS Block 1B; 2 × Mk 32 12.75 in (324 mm) triple torpedo tubes
- Aircraft carried: 2 × MH-60R Seahawk LAMPS Mk III helicopters.

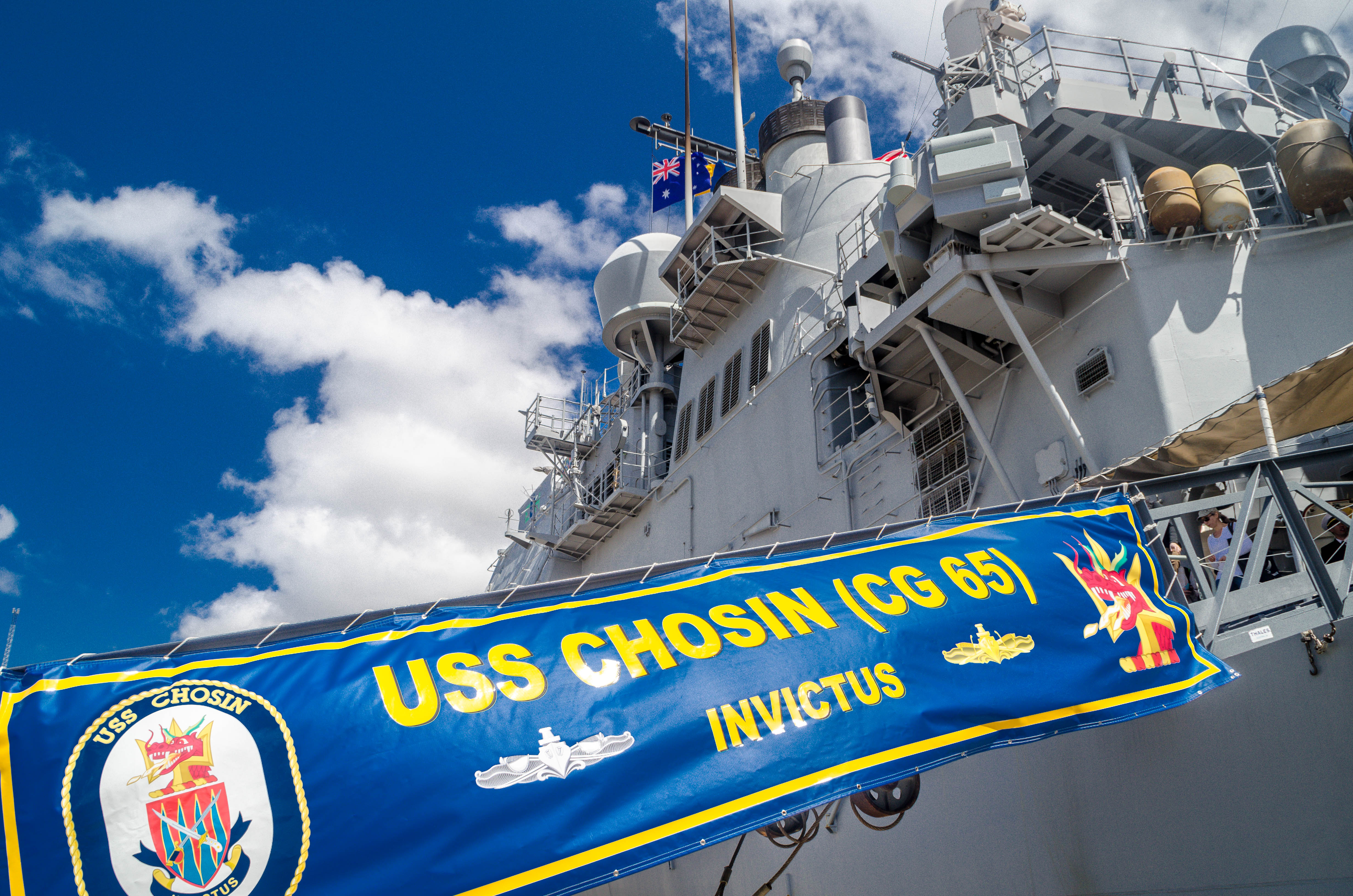
Chosin at International Fleet Review 2013 Open Day

USS Chosin (CG-65) is a Ticonderoga-class guided-missile cruiser serving in the United States Navy. She is named in honor of the Battle of Chosin Reservoir of the Korean War. Commissioned in 1991, she is currently serving in the Pacific Fleet, based at Naval Base San Diego. The cruiser has participated in Operation Southern Watch, Operation Enduring Freedom, and Operation Iraqi Freedom. She is the first US Navy ship to bear this name.

== Operational history ==
In March 2003, Chosin was assigned to Cruiser-Destroyer Group One.

In April 2008, Chosin failed her Board of Inspection and Survey (InSurv) examination and was judged "unfit for sustained combat operations." In spring of 2008, Chosin had received replacement gun barrels for both of her 5-inch guns.

On 6 November 2009, Chosin assumed the role as flagship for the counter-piracy task force Combined Task Force 151. On 17 November 2009, Chosin rescued three stranded Yemeni fishermen in the Gulf of Aden. According to the fishermen, they were left stranded in the water after 12 suspected Somali pirates hijacked their vessel. The fishermen also said that the pirates gave them an ultimatum to either jump overboard with only a wooden plank as a flotation device or be killed. Chosin medical personnel treated the fishermen and gave them food and water. Once the fishermen were deemed to be medically stable, Chosin transferred the fishermen to a Yemen Navy vessel.

In April 2013, Chosin passed its Board of Inspection and Survey (InSurv). On 30 April 2013, Chosin departed her home port of Joint Base Pearl Harbor–Hickam (JBPHH) for a scheduled Western Pacific deployment. While deployed, Chosin was scheduled to conduct theater security operations with partner nations while providing deterrence, promoting peace and security, preserving freedom of the seas and providing humanitarian assistance/disaster response. In October 2013, the cruiser participated in the International Fleet Review 2013 in Sydney, Australia.

In February 2014, Chosin dispatched supplies via helicopter to Royal Canadian Navy ship HMCS Protecteur after a severe engine room fire left her dead in the water about 630 km (390 mi) off the coast of Hawaii. For providing assistance to Protecteur, the Canadian government awarded Chosin a Canadian Forces' Unit Commendation.

In June 2016, Chosin's homeport was changed to San Diego.

In October 2019 it was announced that Chosin would be shifting to Seattle, WA, to complete a depot-level modernization period at Vigor Marine's Harbor Island facility starting in December 2019. Chosin arrived in Seattle in February, 2020.

In February 2023, Vigor completed modernization of Chosin and she returned to her homeport in San Diego. The Navy is seeking to decommission the ship in FY2027.

In October 2024 the Navy announced a successful test aboard Chosin of a Transferable Rearming Mechanism (TRAM) to reload a ship's vertical launch system while at sea rather than in a port.

== Awards ==
- Battle E - 5 awards
- Armed Forces Expeditionary Medal - 3 awards
- Southwest Asia Service Medal
- Humanitarian Service Medal
- Kuwait Liberation Medal (Kuwait)
- Canadian Forces' Unit Commendation - (Feb 2014)
