= Canadian Forces' Unit Commendation =

- Awarded for: Deed or activity considered beyond the demand of normal duty
- Country: Canada
- Eligibility: Any formation, unit or sub-unit of the Canadian Forces (CF), or any similar organization of a foreign armed force working with or in conjunction with the CF
- Established: 1980
- Website: https://www.canada.ca/fr/ministere-defense-nationale/services/medailles/medailles-tableau-index/mention-elogieuse-intention-unites-forces-canadiennes.html

The Canadian Forces' Unit Commendation (French: Mention élogieuse à l'intention des unités des Forces canadiennes) is an award given to military units for "a deed or activity considered beyond the demand of normal duty".

Not only Canadian military units are eligible; Commonwealth and foreign units are also eligible if the deed occurred while serving alongside Canadian units.

This commendation is not given for acts in a combat operations zone, but the Commander-in-Chief Unit Commendation exists for such circumstances.
