= 19th Alberta Dragoons =

- The cap badge of the 19th Alberta Dragoons
- Active: 1911–1965
- Country: Canada
- Branch: Canadian Militia (1908–1940), Canadian Army Reserve (Militia) (1940–1965)
- Type: Dragoons
- Role: Cavalry; Reconnaissance
- Size: One regiment
- Part of: Non-Permanent Active Militia (1908–1940); Royal Canadian Armoured Corps (1940–1965)
- Garrison/HQ: Edmonton, Alberta
- Motto: None
- March: "Lili Marlene"
- Engagements: First World War; Second World War
- Battle honours: See #Battle Honours

The 19th Alberta Dragoons was a cavalry regiment and later an armoured regiment of the Canadian Militia and later the Canadian Army. It was placed on the Supplementary Order of Battle in 1965. In 2006, it was taken off the Supplementary Order of Battle and amalgamated with the South Alberta Light Horse.

The 19th Alberta Dragoons originated in Edmonton, Alberta on 1 February 1908, when the 19th The Alberta Mounted Rifles were authorized to be formed and was redesignated as the 19th Alberta Dragoons on 3 January 1911. On 16 February 1936, it was amalgamated with The Alberta Mounted Rifles. It was redesignated the 19th (Reserve) Alberta Dragoons on 7 November 1940. On 1 April 1946, it was amalgamated with the 2nd (Reserve) Battalion, The Edmonton Fusiliers and redesignated as the 19th (Alberta) Armoured Car Regiment, RCAC. It was redesignated the 19th Alberta Armoured Car Regiment on 4 February 1949, the 19th Alberta Dragoons (19th Armoured Car Regiment) on 1 November 1954 and the 19th Alberta Dragoons on 19 May 1958. It was reduced to nil strength and transferred to the Supplementary Order of Battle on 28 February 1965.

In October 2006, the 19th Alberta Dragoons were amalgamated with the South Alberta Light Horse, which retained that designation.

== Lineage ==
=== 19th Alberta Dragoons ===
- Authorized on 1 February 1908 as the 19th Alberta Mounted Rifles in Edmonton, Alberta.
- Redesignated on 3 January 1911 as the 19th Alberta Dragoons.
- Amalgamated on 16 February 1936 with the Alberta Mounted Rifles with no change in name.
- Amalgamated on 1 April 1946 with The Edmonton Fusiliers and designated as the 19th Armoured Car Regiment (Edmonton Fusiliers).
- Redesignated on 4 February 1949 as the 19th Alberta Armoured Car Regiment.
- Redesignated on 1 November 1954 as 19th Alberta Dragoons (19th Armoured Car Regiment).
- Redesignated on 19 May 1958 as the 19th Alberta Dragoons.
- Reduced to nil strength on 31 March 1965 and moved to the Supplementary Order of Battle.
- Taken off the Supplementary Order of Battle on 31 May 2006 and Amalgamated with the South Alberta Light Horse.

=== The Alberta Mounted Rifles ===
- Originated on 1 April 1908, in Medicine Hat, Alberta, as the 21st Alberta Hussars.
- Redesignated on 15 March 1920, as The Alberta Mounted Rifles.
- Amalgamated on 1 May 1922, with the 23rd Alberta Rangers and Redesignated as the 1st Regiment, The Alberta Mounted Rifles.
- Reorganized on 1 January 1931, into two separate regiments: The Alberta Mounted Rifles and The South Alberta Horse (now the South Alberta Light Horse).
- Amalgamated on 16 February 1936, with the 19th Alberta Dragoons.

=== The Edmonton Fusiliers ===
- Authorized on 1 April 1908 as the 101st Regiment.
- Redesignated on 1 March 1909 as 101st Regiment Edmonton Fusiliers.
- Redesignated on 15 March 1920 as The Edmonton Regiment.
- Reorganised on 15 May 1924 when The Edmonton Regiment was separated into two separate regiments, The Edmonton Fusiliers and The Edmonton Regiment (now The Loyal Edmonton Regiment (4th Battalion, Princess Patricia's Canadian Light Infantry)).
- Amalgamated on 1 April 1936 with A Company of the 13th Machine Gun Battalion, CMGC (now The King's Own Calgary Regiment).
- Redesignated on 15 December 1936 as The Edmonton Fusiliers (MG).
- Established on 7 November 1941 as 2nd (Reserve) Battalion, The Edmonton Fusiliers (MG).
- Redesignated on 1 April 1941 as 2nd (Reserve) Battalion, The Edmonton Fusiliers.
- Amalgamated on 1 April 1946 with the 19th Alberta Dragoons and designated as the 19th Armoured Car Regiment (Edmonton Fusiliers).

== Perpetuations ==
- Canadian Light Horse
- 3rd Regiment, Canadian Mounted Rifles, Canadian Expeditionary Force
- 9th Battalion, CEF
- 66th Battalion (Edmonton Guards), CEF
- 138th (Edmonton, Alberta) Battalion, CEF
- 202nd (Sportsman's) Battalion, CEF.

== History ==
=== Early history ===
On 1 February 1908, the 19th Alberta Mounted Rifles was authorized for service. Its headquarters was at Edmonton and had squadrons at Edmonton, Strathcona and Fort Saskatchewan.

On 3 January 1911, the regiment was redesignated as the 19th Alberta Dragoons.

Regimental officers, between 1908 and 1911

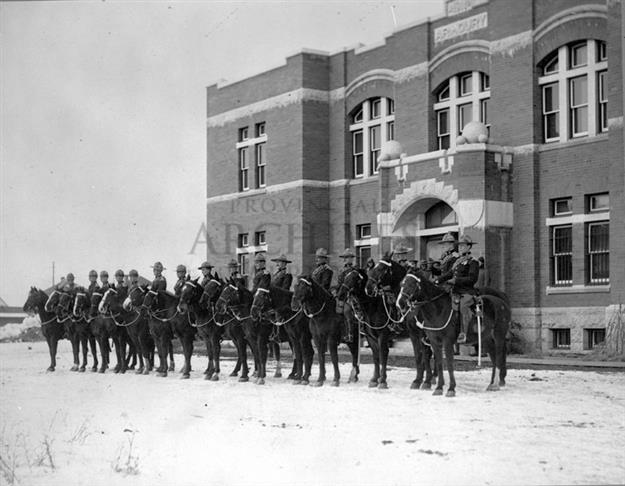
Part of 'B' Squadron, in front of the Connaught Armoury in Edmonton, November 1914

=== Great War ===
Details of the 19th Alberta Dragoons, the 21st Alberta Hussars and 23rd Alberta Rangers were placed on active service on 6 August 1914 for local protective duty.

The 19th Alberta Dragoons recruited the 1st Divisional Cavalry Squadron, CEF, authorized on 10 August 1914, which embarked for Great Britain on 1 October 1914. The squadron was redesignated as A Squadron, Canadian Corps Cavalry Regiment, CEF, on 12 February 1916 and as A Squadron, Canadian Light Horse, CEF, on 21 February 1917. It fought in France from 12 February 1915 until the end of the war and was disbanded on 6 November 1920.

The 3rd Regiment, Canadian Mounted Rifles, CEF, was authorized on 7 November 1914, embarked for England on 12 June 1915 and fought in France as from 22 September 1915 as part of the 1st Canadian Mounted Rifles Brigade until absorbed by the 1st Battalion and 2nd Battalion, Canadian Mounted Rifles on 31 December 1915. The regiment was subsequently disbanded on 12 August 1917.

The 9th Battalion, CEF, was authorized on 10 August 1914 and embarked for Britain on 1 October 1914, where it was redesignated as the 9th Reserve Infantry Battalion, CEF, on 29 April 1915, to provide reinforcements for the Canadian Corps. The battalion was formally disbanded on 15 September 1917.

The 66th Battalion (Edmonton Guards), CEF, was authorized on 20 April 1915 and embarked for Britain on 28 April 1916 where its personnel were absorbed by the 9th Reserve Battalion, CEF on 7 July 1916 to provide reinforcements for the Canadian Corps. The battalion was formally disbanded on 30 August 1920

The 138th (Edmonton, Alberta) Battalion, CEF, was authorized on 22 December 1915 and embarked for Britain on 22 August 1916 where its personnel were absorbed by 128th Battalion, CEF, on 8 December 1916 to provide reinforcements for the Canadian Corps. The battalion was disbanded on 30 August 1920.

The 202nd (Sportsman's) Battalion, CEF, was authorized on 15 July 1916 and embarked for Britain on 23 November 1916 where its personnel were absorbed by the 9th Reserve Battalion, CEF, on 27 May 1917 to provide reinforcements for the Canadian Corps. The battalion was disbanded on 18 February 1918.

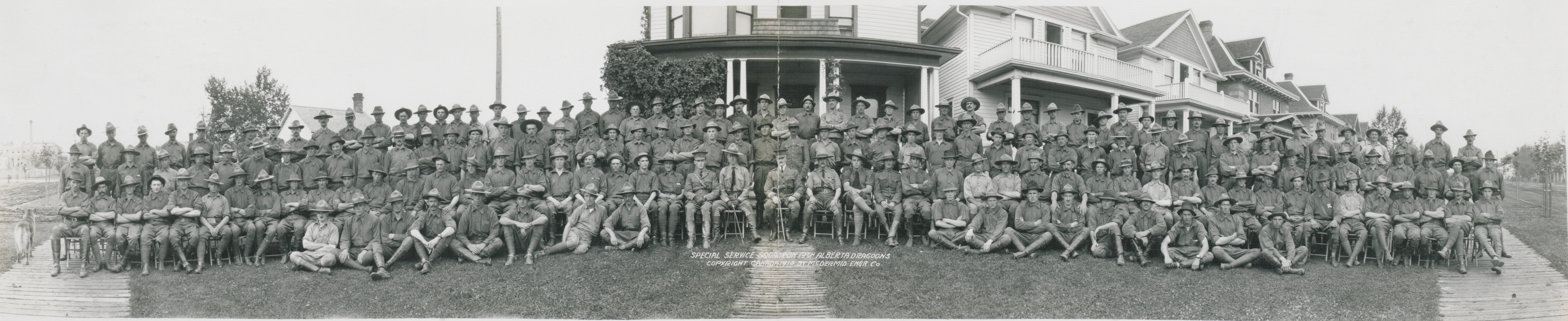
Special Service Squadron of the Alberta Dragoons, 1914

=== Second World War ===
Details of The Edmonton Fusiliers were called out on service on 26 August 1939 and then placed on active service on 1 September 1939 for local protection duties. These details were disbanded on 31 December 1940. The regiment mobilized the 1st Battalion, The Edmonton Fusiliers, CASF, on 24 May 1940. It served in Canada in a home defence role as part of the 13th Infantry Brigade, 6th Canadian Infantry Division. The 1st Battalion disbanded on 14 November 1945. The regiment also mobilized the 3rd Battalion, The Edmonton Fusiliers, CASF, for active service on 12 May 1942, which served in Canada in a home defence role as part of the 16th Infantry Brigade, 8th Canadian Infantry Division. The 3rd Battalion disbanded on 15 August 1943.

=== Post war ===
The 19th Alberta Dragoons were amalgamated with the Edmonton Fusiliers on 1 April 1946.

The regiment was reduced to nil strength and placed on the Supplementary Order of Battle on 28 February 1965.

In October 2006, the 19th Alberta Dragoons were removed from the Supplementary Order of Battle and amalgamated with the South Alberta Light Horse.

== Organization ==
=== 19th Alberta Mounted Rifles (1 February 1908) ===
- Regimental Headquarters (Edmonton)
- A Squadron (Edmonton) (first raised on 1 December 1905 as A Squadron, Canadian Mounted Rifles)
- B Squadron (first raised on 1 December 1905 as B Squadron, Canadian Mounted Rifles)
- C Squadron (Fort Saskatchewan) (first raised on 1 December 1905 as C Squadron, Canadian Mounted Rifles)
- D Squadron (Edmonton) (first raised on 2 April 1907 as E Squadron, Canadian Mounted Rifles)

=== 19th Alberta Dragoons (16 February 1936) ===
- HQ Squadron (Westlock)
- A Squadron (Chauvin)
- B Squadron (South Edmonton)
- C Squadron (Vegreville)

== Alliances ==
- United Kingdom—3rd The King's Own Hussars (Until 1936)
- United Kingdom—19th Royal Hussars (Queen Alexandra's Own) (Until 1922)
- United Kingdom—15th/19th The King's Royal Hussars (1922–1936)

== Battle Honours ==
- Ypres, 1915, '17
- Gravenstafel
- Festubert 1915
- Mount Sorrel
- Somme, 1916
- Flers-Courcelette
- Ancre Heights
- Arras, 1917, '18
- Vimy, 1917
- Hill 70
- Amiens
- Scarpe, 1918
- Drocourt-Queant
- Hindenburg Line
- Canal du Nord
- Cambrai, 1918
- Pursuit To Mons
- France And Flanders, 1915–18

== Notable soldiers ==
- William Antrobus Griesbach, politician
- Earl Robertson, ice hockey goaltender
- Norman Lubbock Robinson, Irish-born photographer
- John Hornby, English explorer
- Robert T. Anderson

== Armoury ==
Site	Date(s)	Designated	Location	Description	Image
Connaught Armoury 85th Avenue	1911	Canada's Register of Historic Places	Edmonton, Alberta, Canada	The oldest armoury in Alberta, a two-storey, rectangular brick building with a low-pitched gable roof, in the historic district, was built to house 19th Alberta Dragoons	

== See also ==
- List of regiments of cavalry of the Canadian Militia (1900–1920)
- List of armouries in Canada
- Military history of Canada
- History of the Canadian Army
- Canadian Forces
