= 13th Canadian Infantry Brigade =

Brigade of the Canadian Army

13th Canadian Brigade 13th Canadian Infantry Brigade
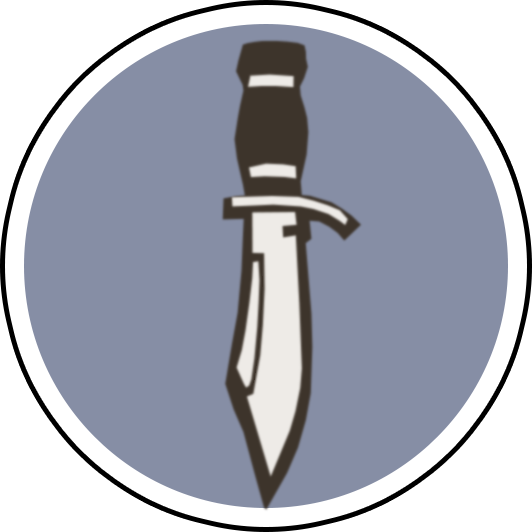
- Patch worn by the brigade during World War II
- Active: 1917-1918; 1940-1944
- Country: Canada
- Branch: Canadian Army
- Type: Infantry
- Size: Brigade
- Part of: 5th Canadian Division (First World War); 6th Canadian Infantry Division (Second World War); Pacific Command (Canadian Army) (Second World War)
- Engagements: World War I World War II: Operation Cottage

Commanders
- Notable commanders: Oliver Milton Martin; Harry Wickwire Foster

The 13th Canadian Infantry Brigade was a formation of the Canadian Army that served in both World Wars. During World War I, the brigade formed part of the 5th Canadian Division. However, the 13th Brigade never saw combat as the brigade along with the 5th Canadian Division was broken up to provide reinforcements to the 4 other divisions of the Canadian Corps. During the Second World War, the brigade formed part of the 6th Canadian Infantry Division serving on the west coast in the home defence role and in June 1943, the brigade took part in Operation Cottage on Kiska during the Aleutian Islands campaign. During the Second World War, the 13th Canadian Brigade wore a patch which consisted of a circular patch with an upside-down sliver knife on a blue circle with a white outline.

== Order of Battle ==
=== World War I ===
- 128th (Moose Jaw) Battalion, CEF. February 1917 – May 1917. Absorbed by the 15th Canadian Reserve Battalion;
- 134th Battalion (48th Highlanders), CEF. February 1917 – February 1918. Absorbed by the 12th Canadian Reserve Battalion;
- 160th (Bruce) Battalion, CEF. February 1917 – February 1918. Absorbed by the 4th Canadian Reserve Battalion;
- 164th Battalion (Halton and Dufferin), CEF. May 1917 – April 1918. Absorbed by the 8th Canadian Reserve Battalion;
- 202nd (Sportsman's) Battalion, CEF. February 1917 – May 28, 1918. Absorbed by the 9th Canadian Reserve Battalion;
- 208th Battalion (Canadian Irish), CEF. May 1917 – January 3, 1918. Absorbed by the 2nd and 3rd Canadian Reserve Battalions.

=== World War II ===
==== March – July 1942 ====
- 2nd Battalion, The Canadian Scottish
- The Brockville Rifles
- 1st Battalion, The Edmonton Fusiliers
- No. 13 Defence Platoon (Lorne Scots)

==== 13th Canadian Brigade Group - "Greenlight" Force (June 1943) ====
- Headquarters 13th Brigade Group
- 1st Battalion, The Canadian Fusiliers (City of London) Regiment
- 1st Battalion, The Winnipeg Grenadiers
- 1st Battalion, The Rocky Mountain Rangers
- 1st Battalion, Le Regiment du Hull
- "C" Company, 1st Battalion, The Saint John Fusiliers (Machine Gun)
- 24th Field Regiment, Royal Canadian Artillery
- 46th Light Anti-Aircraft Regiment, Royal Canadian Artillery

==== 13th Canadian Infantry Brigade Group (November 1943) ====
- 24th Field Regiment, RCA
- 46th Light AA Battery, RCA
- 1st Battalion, The Canadian Fusiliers (City of London) Regiment
- 1st Battalion, The Winnipeg Grenadiers
- 1st Battalion, The Rocky Mountain Rangers
- 1st Battalion, Le Regiment de Hull
- 1 Company, 1st Battalion, The Saint John Fusiliers (Machine Gun)
- No. 13 Defence Platoon (Lorne Scots)
- 24th Field Company, RCE
