= South Alberta Light Horse =

The South Alberta Light Horse
- Regimental cap badge
- Active: 1885, 1905–present
- Country: Canada
- Branch: Canadian Militia (1885, 1905-1940); Canadian Army (1940-present)
- Type: Originally light cavalry/mounted infantry, then armoured, then Armoured reconnaissance
- Role: Armoured reconnaissance
- Size: 2 squadrons
- Part of: Non-Permanent Active Militia (1885, 1905-1940); Royal Canadian Armoured Corps (1940–Present); 41 Canadian Brigade Group
- Garrison/HQ: Medicine Hat (A Squadron) and Edmonton (B Squadron); 3 Troop, A Sqn detached to Lethbridge
- Nickname: Sally Horse / Alberta's Regiment
- Motto: Semper alacer (Latin for 'Always brisk')
- Colours: Red, yellow and blue (camp flag); Scarlet with yellow facings (full dress); Scarlet with black facings (mess dress)
- March: "A Southerly Wind and a Cloudy Sky"
- Mascot: Heine the Pony
- Anniversaries: Official birthday 3 July 1905
- Engagements: North-West Rebellion; First World War; Second World War; Afghanistan
- Battle honours: See #Battle honours
- Website: canada.ca/en/army/corporate/3-canadian-division/the-south-alberta-light-horse.html

Commanders
- Current commander: LCol Thomas Bradley
- Colonel-in-Chief: Sophie, Duchess of Edinburgh
- Honorary colonel: Catherine Roozen
- Honorary lieutenant-colonel: Maureen Purvis
- Regimental sergeant-major: CWO Derek Rosendal
- Notable commanders: LCol A.H. Bell (31st Bn) 1914; LCol G.D. Wotherspoon (SAR) 1943; Col James Walker (15th Light Horse) 1905; BGen Tom Putt 2003-2005

Insignia
- NATO Map Symbol
- Abbreviation: SALH

The South Alberta Light Horse (SALH) is a Canadian Army armoured reconnaissance regiment of the Canadian Army Reserve. It traces its complicated lineage to the Rocky Mountain Rangers, and claims its direct ancestry to the 15th Light Horse, along with various other Alberta based cavalry units. The "Light Horse" designation comes from its light cavalry and mounted infantry origins.

The SALH is part of 41 Canadian Brigade Group of the 3rd Canadian Division, and is based in Medicine Hat, Edmonton and Lethbridge, Alberta.

== History ==
=== Early history ===
The South Alberta Light Horse traces its beginnings to the period of the Riel Rebellion of 1885. During this conflict the Rocky Mountain Rangers (RMR) of Fort Macleod, which comprised 150 officers and men, were tasked with the protection of the area ranging from the U.S. border to the High River and from the Rockies to Medicine Hat. The RMR saw no action during their three months of existence during the rebellion, and the SALH carries the battle honour "North West Canada, 1885" on their colours.

This irregular light cavalry unit is seen as the true genesis of the regiment. The 15th Light Horse, the official direct ancestor of the SALH, was raised in Calgary on July 3, 1905. It consisted of four newly organized cavalry squadrons: Calgary (A Squadron), Fort MacLeod (B Squadron), High River (C Squadron), and Cochrane (D Squadron). From this point until the mid-1950s the regiment's history can be described as a series of complicated amalgamations and redesignations of Alberta army reserve units of all arms until the regiment as it is now was formed in Calgary in 1954. At the beginning of the First World War, the Alberta militia units destined to become part of SALH were four cavalry regiments – 15th Light Horse in Calgary, 19th Alberta Dragoons in Edmonton, 21st Alberta Hussars in Medicine Hat and 23rd Alberta Rangers in Fort Macleod – and two infantry regiments (101st Regiment "Edmonton Fusiliers" and 103rd Regiment "Calgary Rifles").

==== WWI and interregnum ====
The camp flag of the South Alberta Light Horse.

In the First World War, instead of mobilising the Canadian militia to send overseas, new units were formed from volunteers of the militia and general public. The militia units generally became organizations for recruiting, induction and preliminary training for the new units. The 19th Alberta Dragoons recruited the 1st Divisional Cavalry Squadron, CEF, which landed in France in February 1915. After other divisions joined the 1st Canadian Division in France and the Canadian Corps was formed, the squadron was attached to the corps and became A Squadron, Canadian Light Horse, CEF. The troopers of this squadron wore 19th Alberta Dragoon badges throughout the war.

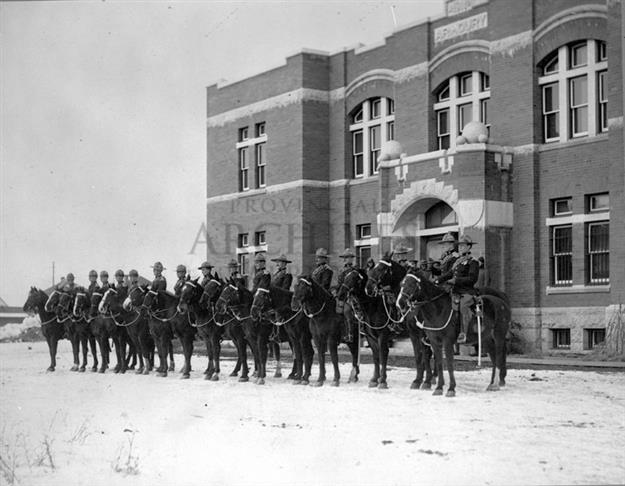
Part of 'B' Sqn, 19th AB Dragoons in front of the Connaught Armoury in Edmonton, Nov. 1914

Also recruited by SALH's predecessors were three regiments of Canadian Mounted Rifles (CMR): the 3rd, 12th and 13th.

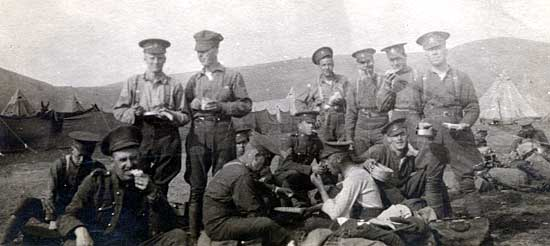
Signals troops of 13th Canadian Mounted Rifles with soldiers of the PPCLI at Camp Sarcee near Calgary AB, 1915

The 3rd Regiment, Canadian Mounted Rifles, CEF, was mobilized at Medicine Hat and landed in France in September 1915 as part of the 1st CMR Brigade. At the end of 1915, the CMR units in France were converted from two cavalry brigades (six regiments) into one infantry brigade (four battalions). The troopers of the 3rd Regiment were split up, half going to the 1st CMR Battalion and half to the 2nd CMR Battalion; both these battalions fought in the 3rd Canadian Division. The 12th and 13th Regiments CMR were broken up for reinforcements in England.

The SALH also counts a First World War artillery unit as an ancestor: 22nd (Howitzer) Battery, CFA, CEF. The battery landed in France on 19 January 1916, where it served as part of the 6th Brigade, 2nd Canadian Divisional Artillery until the end of the war. The battery was demobilized at Hamilton, 25 May 1919, and was disbanded on 1 November 1920. The battery is perpetuated by the 22nd Field Battery, RCA, Gleichen Alberta.

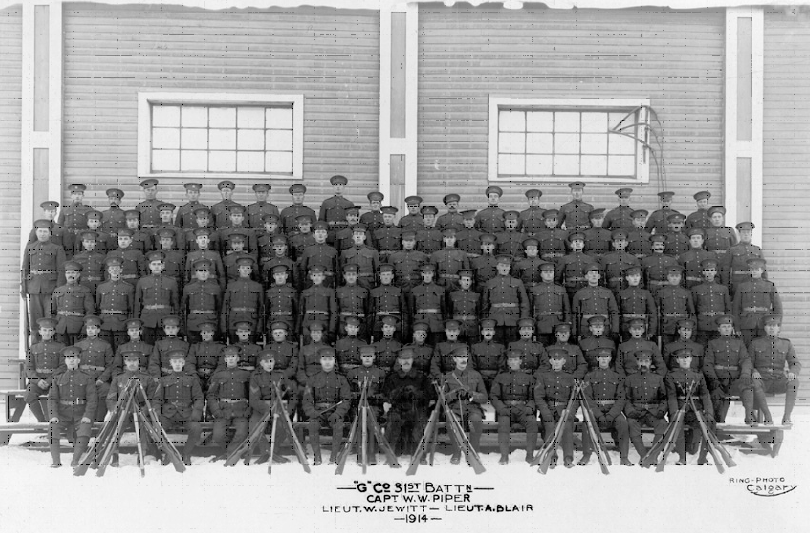
"G" Company, 31st Battalion CEF in Calgary, 1914

Of the eight infantry battalions recruited by the SALH's predecessors, only one entered combat as a unit. The 31st Battalion, CEF, landed in France in September 1915 with the 2nd Canadian Division. It was awarded 22 battle honours, including such notable actions as Vimy and Passchendaele. The other seven battalions – 9th, 66th (Edmonton Guards), 113th Battalion (Lethbridge Highlanders), CEF, 138th (Edmonton), 175th (Medicine Hat), 187th (Central Alberta) and 202nd (Sportsman's) – were broken up for reinforcements in England.

113th Battalion portrait, Lethbridge exhibition grounds, Lethbridge AB

The 31st Battalion (part of the 6th Infantry Brigade) participated in the first tank attack in history at the Battle of Flers-Courcelette on 15 September 1916, while A Squadron, Canadian Light Horse, made the last cavalry charge in Canadian history at the battle of Iwuy on 10 October 1918. This means that among the predecessor units of the SALH, one participated in the first military operation involving the tank and another mounted the last cavalry charge in Canadian history.

The period between the world wars saw two major reorganizations of the Canadian Militia, the first from 1920 to 1924 and the second from 1935 to 1936. By the outbreak of the Second World War, the ancestors of the SALH were two cavalry regiments (15th Alberta Light Horse in Calgary and 19th Alberta Dragoons in Edmonton) an independent artillery battery (22nd Field Battery, RCA, in Gleichen) and two infantry battalions (The Edmonton Fusiliers and the South Alberta Regiment in Medicine Hat).

=== Second World War ===
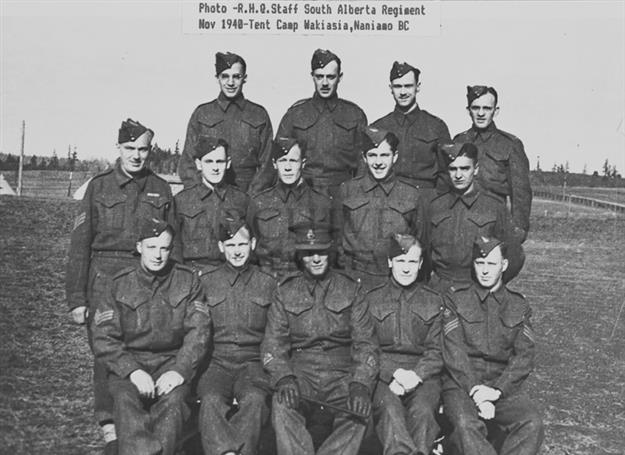
Group photo of the R.H.Q. staff of the South Alberta Regiment at Wakesiah Camp, Nanaimo, B.C.

The 15th Alberta Light Horse contributed to several active service units, including the 31st (Alberta) Reconnaissance Regiment which remained in the Calgary area until the last year of the war. The South Alberta Regiment, recruited an active service battalion in the Medicine Hat area in the summer of 1940. This infantry unit trained in Canada until 1942 when it was reorganized as the 29th Armoured Regiment (The South Alberta Regiment) and moved to England in August. The SAR was granted 15 battle honours for its service overseas, redesignated the 29th Armoured Reconnaissance Regiment (The South Alberta Regiment) in 1944. The unit was selected by Major-General F. F. Worthington to be the reconnaissance regiment of the 4th Canadian (Armoured) Division because he wanted "keen-eyed prairie men" as his scouts. The 29th was again converted, with all armoured reconnaissance regiments, to the war establishment of a regular armoured regiment in 1944 and sent to France in July of that year. It fought through Normandy, Belgium, the Scheldt, the Rhineland, the Netherlands and Germany until the end of the war in Europe in May 1945.

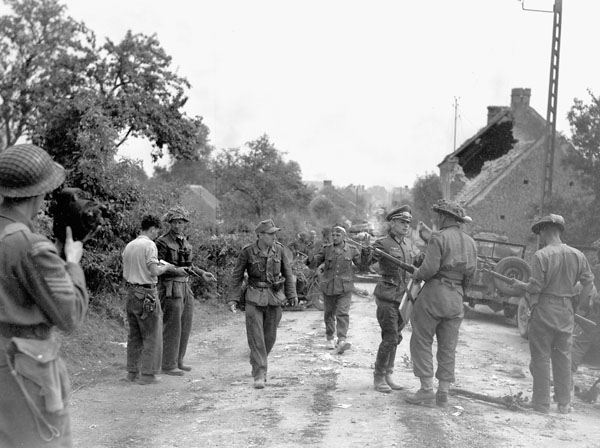
Currie (left of centre, holding a revolver) accepting the surrender of German troops at St. Lambert-sur-Dives, France, 19 August 1944. This photo captures the actions that would lead to him being awarded the Victoria Cross.

The 22nd Field Battery became part of the 13th Field Regiment, which landed with the 3rd Canadian Infantry Division on D-Day at Juno Beach.

The Edmonton Fusiliers raised two active battalions, one for the 6th Canadian Infantry Division and one for the 8th Canadian Infantry Division. Both these divisions were home defence formations that did not go overseas.

Meanwhile, the 31st (Alberta) Reconnaissance Regiment had served in the Calgary area until January 1945 when it was shipped to England. It was disbanded a month later and broken up for reinforcements.

=== Postwar ===
The end of the war saw the re-emergence of The South Alberta Regiment (infantry) in Medicine Hat and the 15th Alberta Light Horse (armoured) in Calgary. The 15th however, was not to keep its name, and it was united with the 22nd Field Battery and renamed 68th Light Anti-Aircraft Regiment, RCA. This remained until 1954 when it united with The South Alberta Regiment of Medicine Hat and the 41st Anti-Tank Regiment out of Calgary to become The South Alberta Light Horse (29th Armoured Regiment) out of Calgary. In 1958 "29th Armoured Regiment" was dropped from the name, and two years later, in 1960, the regiment was moved back to its old headquarters in Medicine Hat. The regiment remained an army reserve armoured unit until 1968 when it lost its tanks and was retasked as an armoured reconnaissance unit.

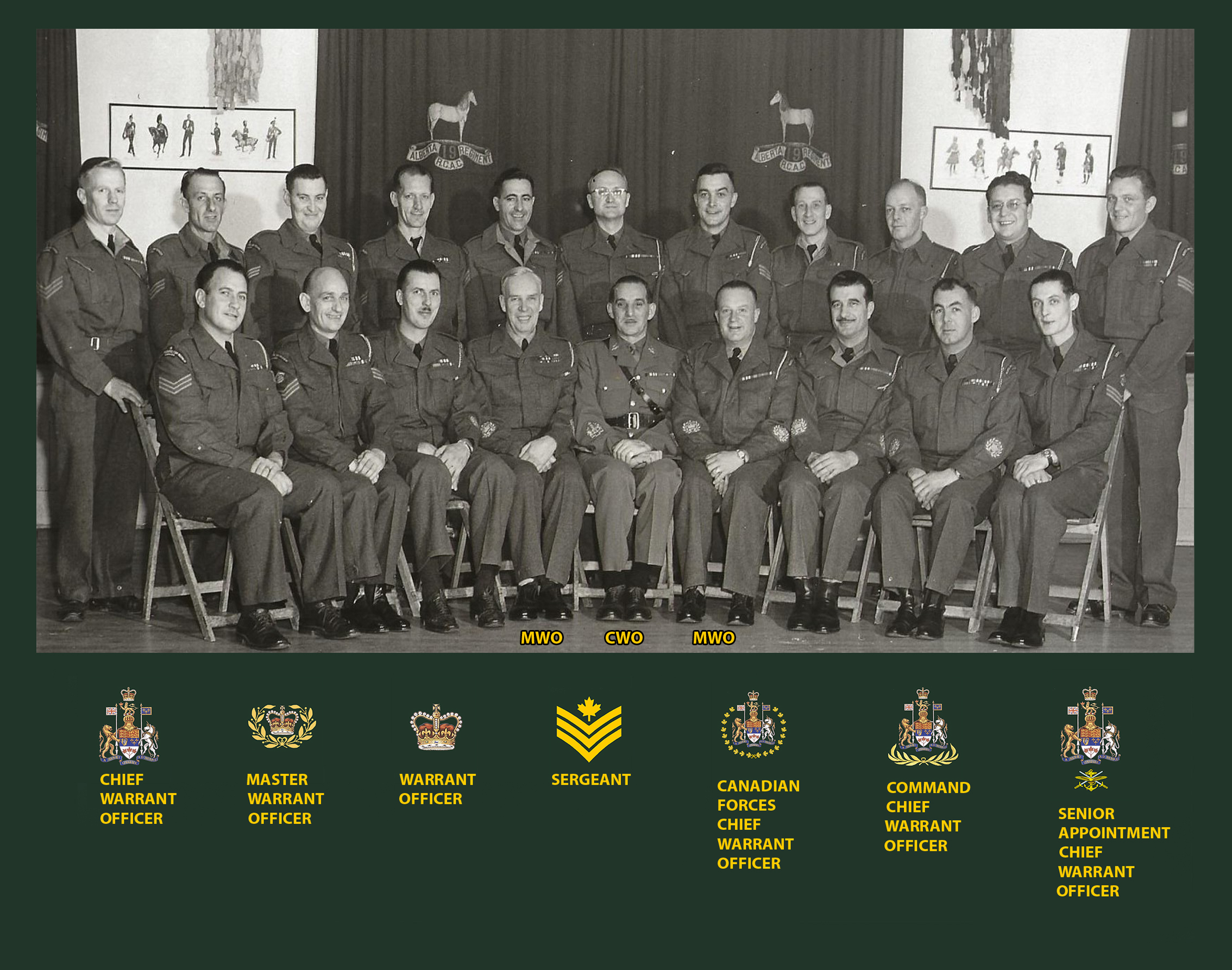
Warrant Officers' & Sergeants' Mess, 19th Alberta Dragoons, RCAC (M), 1953

The two Edmonton units (19th Alberta Dragoons and The Edmonton Fusiliers) merged in 1946 as the 19th (Alberta) Armoured Car Regiment, RCAC. This regiment was renamed back to 19th Alberta Dragoons in 1958, but in the 1965 reorganization of the Reserves it was transferred to the Supplementary Order of Battle: it still legally existed, but had no personnel assigned to it.

=== Recent history (1970–present) ===
In 1978 the SALH established an independent B Squadron in Edmonton to train out of Griesbach Barracks, and was originally organized as a reconnaissance unit. Though later, B Squadron transitioned to AVGP and was redesignated as armoured squadron in the early 1980s. In line with this change, the rest of the regiment followed suit and by 1985 the entire regiment returned to being an armoured regiment.

In 2005, the AVGP Cougar was retired from service, and the SALH reroled back to Armoured Reconnaissance, equipped with the Mercedes-Benz G Wagon - Light Utility Vehicle Wheeled (LUVW).

The regiment exercised its Freedom of the City of Medicine Hat In 2006, the SALH formally amalgamated with the nil-strength 19th Alberta Dragoons, a regiment that had been on the Supplementary Order of Battle since 1965, and now officially maintains the battle honours and traditions of its Edmonton predecessors.

In the Spring of 2015, the regiment sought and received permission to detach 3 Troop, A Squadron from Medicine Hat to Lethbridge, as recruiting in the Lethbridge region had been successful enough to support several troopers travelling to Medicine Hat on a weekly basis for training. As this group grew, it became possible to detach 3 Troop to its own lines co-located with the 20th Independent Field Battery, RCA, at the Vimy Ridge Armoury in Lethbridge.

The regiment is presently training with the new Textron Tactical Armoured Patrol Vehicle, which was delivered to 3rd Canadian Division units in the Spring to Summer of 2017.

== Lineage ==
=== 1885–1914 ===
Lineage of the South Alberta Light Horse, 1885–1914

1885	Rocky Mountain Rangers
1885	Disbanded
1901	D Sqn, CMR
1905	The 15th Light Horse	D Sqn, The 15th Light Horse	Independent sqns of CMR
1906	The Alberta Rangers (Note: Independent squadron)
1908	23rd Alberta Rangers (Note: Regiment)	21st Alberta Hussars	19th The Alberta Mounted Rifles	101st Regt
1909	101st Regt “Edmonton Fusiliers”
1911	19th Alberta Dragoons

=== 1914–1939 ===
CEF units perpetuated by The South Alberta Light Horse
Unit	Formed	Arrived France	Disbanded or absorbed	Notes	Perpetuation
1914: 1st Divisional Cavalry Squadron, CEF; 1916: A Squadron, Canadian Corps Cavalry Regiment, CEF; 1917: A Squadron, Canadian Light Horse, CEF	August 10, 1914	February 12, 1915	November 6, 1920	Part of the Canadian Corps	19th Alberta Dragoons
1914: 22nd Battery, CEF; 1915: 30th (Howitzer) Battery, CFA, CEF; 1915: 22nd (Howitzer) Battery, CFA, CEF	August 10, 1914	January 19, 1916	October 23, 1920	In March 1915, absorbed by the Canadian Reserve Artillery Brigade, CEF, then re-formed in September. Part of 6th (Howitzer) Brigade, CFA, CEF	22nd Battery, CFA
1914: 9th Battalion, CEF; 1915: 9th Reserve Infantry Battalion, CEF	August 10, 1914	N/A	September 15, 1917		The Edmonton Fusiliers
3rd Regiment, Canadian Mounted Rifles, CEF	November 7, 1914	September 22, 1915	December 31, 1915	Part of the 1st Canadian Mounted Rifles Brigade. Absorbed by the 1st and 2nd Battalions, Canadian Mounted Rifles, CEF	1st Regiment, The Alberta Mounted Rifles
31st Battalion, CEF	November 7, 1914	September 18, 1915	August 30, 1920	Part of 6th Infantry Brigade, 2nd Canadian Division	The Alberta Regiment
12th Regiment, Canadian Mounted Rifles, CEF	March 15, 1915	N/A	February 3, 1916	Absorbed by the Canadian Cavalry Depot, CEF	15th Canadian Light Horse
1915: 13th Regiment, Canadian Mounted Rifles, CEF; 1916: 13th "Overseas" Canadian Mounted Rifles Battalion, CEF	March 15, 1915	N/A	July 19, 1916	Absorbed by various units	2nd Regiment, The Alberta Mounted Rifles
66th "Overseas" Battalion, CEF	April 20, 1915	N/A	July 7, 1916	Absorbed by the 9th Reserve Battalion, CEF	The Edmonton Fusiliers
113th "Overseas" Battalion, CEF	December 22, 1915	N/A	October 8, 1916	Absorbed by the 17th Reserve Battalion, CEF	The South Alberta Regiment
138th "Overseas" Battalion, CEF	December 22, 1915	N/A	December 8, 1916	Absorbed by the 128th "Overseas" Battalion, CEF	The Edmonton Fusiliers
175th "Overseas" Battalion, CEF	July 15, 1916	N/A	January 10, 1917	Absorbed by the 21st Reserve Battalion, CEF	The South Alberta Regiment
187th "Overseas" Battalion, CEF	July 15, 1916	N/A	January 20, 1917	Absorbed by the 21st Reserve Battalion, CEF	The South Alberta Regiment
202nd "Overseas" Battalion, CEF	July 15, 1916	N/A	May 27, 1917	Absorbed by the 9th Reserve Battalion, CEF	The Edmonton Fusiliers

Lineage of the South Alberta Light Horse, 1918–1939

The 15th Light Horse	23rd Alberta Rangers	21st Alberta Hussars	19th Alberta Dragoons	101st Regt "Edmonton Fusiliers"
1920	1st Bn (31st Bn, CEF), The Alberta Regt (Note: Authorized but not organized)	22nd Bty, CFA	1st Regt, 15th Canadian Light Horse	1st Regt (3rd CMR Bn, CEF), The Alberta Mounted Rifles	1st Regt, 19th Alberta Dragoons	1st Bn (49th Bn, CEF), The Edmonton Regt	2nd Bn (Edmonton Fusiliers) (9th Bn, CEF), The Edmonton Regt
1921	Organized	2nd Bn (31st Bn, CEF), The Alberta Regt
1922	1st Regt (12th Regt, CMR, CEF), 15th Canadian Light Horse	2nd Regt (13th CMR Bn, CEF), The Alberta Mounted Rifles
1924	1st Bn (31st Bn, CEF), The South Alberta Regt	The North Alberta Regt	1st Bn (9th Bn, CEF), The Edmonton Fusiliers
1925	22nd Fd Bty, CA
1926	2nd Regt (13th Regt CMR, CEF), The Alberta Mounted Rifles	1st Regt (3rd Regt CMR, CEF), The Alberta Mounted Rifles
1931	1st Regt (13th Regt CMR, CEF), The South Alberta Horse
C Coy, 13th MG Bn, CMGC	A Coy, 13th MG Bn, CMGC
1932	Perpetuates Rocky Mountain Rangers
1935	22nd Fd Bty, RCA
1936	The South Alberta Regt	15th Alberta Light Horse	19th Alberta Dragoons	The Edmonton Fusiliers (MG)

=== 1939–1946 ===
Lineage of the South Alberta Light Horse, 1939–1946

The South Alberta Regt	22nd Fd Bty, RCA	15th Alberta Light Horse	19th Alberta Dragoons	The Edmonton Fusiliers (MG)
1940	1st Bn, The South Alberta Regt, CASF	2nd (Reserve) Bn, The South Alberta Regt	22nd/78th Fd Bty, RCA, CASF	22nd (Reserve) Fd Bty, RCA	15th (Reserve) Alberta Light Horse	19th (Reserve) Alberta Dragoons	1st Bn, The Edmonton Fusiliers, CASF
1941	22nd Fd Bty, RCA, CASF	2nd (Reserve) Bn, The Edmonton Fusiliers
1942	29th Armd Regt (The South Alberta Regt), CAC, CASF	2nd (Reserve) Bn, The South Alberta Regt (MG)	41st (Reserve) Fd Regt, RCA	31st (Alberta) Recce Regt, CAC, CASF (Note: Mobilized by 15th Alberta Light Horse)	3rd Bn, The Edmonton Fusiliers, CASF
1943	29th Armd Recce Regt (The South Alberta Regt), CAC, CASF	Disbanded
1945	29th Armd Recce Regt (The South Alberta Regt), RCAC, CASF	Disbanded	22nd Fd Bty, RCA	Disbanded
1945	2nd 22nd Fd Bty, RCA, CAOF
1946	Disbanded	Disbanded	Disbanded

=== 1946–present ===
Lineage of the South Alberta Light Horse, 1946–present

2nd (Reserve) Bn, The South Alberta Regt (MG)	41st (Reserve) Fd Regt, RCA	22nd Fd Bty, RCA	15th (Reserve) Alberta Light Horse	19th (Reserve) Alberta Dragoons	2nd (Reserve) Bn, The Edmonton Fusiliers
1946	The South Alberta Regt	41st Anti-Tank Regt (Self Propelled), RCA	68th Light Anti-Aircraft Regt, RCA	19th (Alberta) Armd Car Regt, RCAC
1949	19th Alberta Armd Car Regt
1954	The South Alberta Light Horse (29th Armd Regt)	19th Alberta Dragoons (19th Armd Car Regt)
1958	The South Alberta Light Horse	19th Alberta Dragoons
1965	Supplementary Order of Battle
1985	The South Alberta Light Horse (RCAC)
1997	The South Alberta Light Horse
2006	The South Alberta Light Horse

== Battle honours ==
=== North West Rebellion ===
- North West Canada, 1885

=== The Great War ===
1915 1916 1917 1918
- Ypres, 1915, '17
- Gravenstafel
- St. Julien
- Festubert, 1915
- Mount Sorrel
- Somme, 1916, '18
- Flers–Courcelette
- Thiepval
- Ancre Heights
- Arras, 1917, '18
- Vimy, 1917
- Arleux
- Scarpe, 1917, '18
- Hill 70
- Passchendaele
- Amiens
- Drocourt–Quéant
- Hindenburg Line
- Canal du Nord
- Cambrai, 1918
- Pursuit to Mons
- France and Flanders, 1915–18

=== Second World War ===
1944 1945
- Falaise
- Falaise Road
- The Laison
- St. Lambert-sur-Dives
- Moerbrugge
- The Scheldt
- Woensdrecht
- The Lower Maas
- Kapelsche Veer
- The Rhineland
- The Hochwald
- Veen
- Twente Canal
- Bad Zwischenahn
- North-West Europe, 1944–1945

=== War in Afghanistan ===
- Afghanistan

== Alliances ==
- United Kingdom – The Light Dragoons
- United Kingdom – The Princess of Wales's Royal Regiment (Queen's and Royal Hampshires)

== Regimental organization ==
The regiment has soldiers in Edmonton, Medicine Hat, and Lethbridge. With the advent of the Land Force Reserve Restructuring project, The South Alberta Light Horse was organized as an armoured reconnaissance regiment on September 1, 2004.

The commanding officer of the SALH is Lieutenant-Colonel Thomas Bradley. The regimental sergeant-major is Chief Warrant Officer Marcel A.R. Chenier.

== Cadet units ==
There are several Royal Canadian Army Cadets units spread across Alberta that are affiliated to the South Alberta Light Horse.

Corps	Location
2051 RCACC	Edmonton
2313 RCACC	Medicine Hat
3068 RCACC	Camrose
3053 RCACC	Lac Ste. Anne (Onoway)

Cadet units affiliated to the South Alberta Light Horse receive support and also are entitled to wear traditional regimental accoutrements on their uniforms.

== Order of precedence ==
Preceded by The British Columbia Regiment (Duke of Connaught's Own)	South Alberta Light Horse	Succeeded by The Saskatchewan Dragoons

== Notes and references ==
- Century of Service: The History of the South Alberta Light Horse by Donald E. Graves, ISBN 1-896941-43-5
- South Albertas: A Canadian Regiment at War by Donald E. Graves

== Media ==
- Century of Service: The History of the South Alberta Light Horse by Donald E. Graves (May 15, 2005)
