= The Land of Feast or Famine =

The Land of Feast or Famine was the title of several books about Canada's north:

- The Land of Feast or Famine (Hornby), the name of a 36-page manuscript John Hornby left when he starved to death in 1927
- The Land of Feast or Famine (Ingstad), Helge Ingstad published a book by this title in 1931
- The Land of Feast or Famine (Robinson), Norman Lubbock Robinson, a good friend of Hornby, published his own book, by this name, which he dedicated to Hornby
