= Harcus Strachan =

Scottish-born Canadian recipient of the Victoria Cross

Harcus Strachan VC MC
- Born: 7 November 1884; Bo'ness, Scotland
- Died: 1 May 1982 (aged 97); Vancouver, British Columbia, Canada
- Military career
- Allegiance: Canada
- Branch: Canadian Expeditionary Force
- Rank: Lieutenant-Colonel
- Unit: The Fort Garry Horse
- Commands: 1st Battalion, Edmonton Fusiliers
- Conflicts: World War I; World War II
- Awards: Victoria Cross; Military Cross

Henry Mareus "Harcus" Strachan VC, MC (/ˈstrɔːn/; 7 November 1884 – 1 May 1982) was a Scottish born Canadian recipient of the Victoria Cross, the highest and most prestigious award for valour in the face of the enemy that can be awarded to British and Commonwealth forces.

== Early life ==
Strachan was born in Bo'ness, Scotland, and attended the Royal High School, Edinburgh, and the University of Edinburgh before emigrating to Canada in 1905. He homesteaded a farm in the Chauvin district, near Wainwright, Alberta. Prior to being awarded the VC, Strachan was initiated into freemasonry in his birthplace, at the Douglas Lodge 409 Bo'ness, on 22 January 1917.

== World War I ==
Strachan joined the Canadian Expeditionary Force in July 1915.

Strachan was 33 years of age, and serving in the First World War with the Canadian Cavalry Brigade as a lieutenant in the Fort Garry Horse, when he performed the action for which he was awarded the VC. It has become traditional for the Garrys to hold a regimental dinner every year on the anniversary of Strachan's unlikely cavalry exploit.

The action occurred during the Battle of Cambrai, on 20 November 1917 at Masnières, France, after Lieutenant Strachan took command of the mounted squadron of Garrys when his commanding officer, 'B' Squadron leader Captain Campbell, was killed by machine gun fire.

Believing that the 29th Division with tanks already held the village of Masnières, Brigadier General Nelson of the 88th Brigade ordered the Fort Garry Horse to advance across the Saint-Quentin Canal. On approaching the river bridge in front of Masnières, the Garrys could see that the town was still held by the enemy and that the bridge across the canal was broken. The Garrys then found the Hampshire Regiment were crossing, in single file, over the lock gates. Tearing up a wooden pier, they built a bridge suitable for horses to cross. By 4 pm 'B' Squadron set out through a gap in the enemy wire, and approached the German front line at a gallop. 'B' Squadron leader Captain Campbell was killed, and Strachan took command, leading 'B' Squadron at the gallop across the countryside toward Rumilly.

Due to the state of the crossing at Masnières and the limited available daylight Major-General W. H. Greenly, commanding 2nd Cavalry Division, ordered any large-scale cavalry action to halt and ordered the recall of the units that had crossed the canal. Neither Lieutenant Colonel R.W. Patterson, commanding the Fort Garry Horse, nor mounted orderlies, could find 'B' Squadron, who were south-east of Rumilly, to give them the recall order.

'B' Squadron, led by Strachan, cut its way through a line of infantry in a heavily camouflaged road and found a four-gunned German field battery in front of them. They charged, and rode down or sabred the gunners. German infantry positioned beyond the guns fired on them, and again Strachan led a charge. They broke the infantry but were under fire, taking more casualties as they rode towards Rumilly. Now with less than fifty men and only five unwounded horses, they sheltered in a sunken road 1,200 yards east of the town. Strachan realised there was to be no support, so he had the horses cut loose and he led the unit in a withdrawal towards the canal. During this fighting withdrawal, 'B' Squadron scattered four bodies of German troops.

In short, Lieutenant Strachan led the squadron through the enemy line of machine-gun posts and then, with the surviving men, led the charge on the German battery, killing seven of the gunners with his sword. When all the gunners were killed and the battery silenced, he rallied his men and fought his way back at night on foot through the enemy's lines, bringing all unwounded men safely in, together with 15 prisoners.

His citation reads:

For most conspicuous bravery and leadership during operations. He took command of the squadron of his regiment when the squadron leader, approaching the enemy front line at a gallop, was killed. Lt. Strachan led the squadron through the enemy line of machine-gun posts, and then, with the surviving men, led the charge on the enemy battery, killing seven of the gunners with his sword. All the gunners having been killed and the battery silenced, he rallied his men and fought his way back at night through the enemy’s line, bringing all unwounded men safely in, together with 15 prisoners. The operation – which resulted in the silencing of an enemy battery, the killing of the whole battery personnel and many infantry, and the cutting of three main lines of telephone communication two miles in rear of the enemy’s front line – was only rendered possible by the outstanding gallantry and fearless leading of this officer - London Gazette

Strachan, having been promoted to captain, received his VC from King George V on 6 January 1918.

== Later life ==
After the war, he returned to his farm in the Chauvin district, Alberta

He ran as a Liberal candidate in the 1921 Alberta provincial election, in the Wainwright constituency, but was not elected, a victim of the Farmers' sweep.

He went into banking. By 1930, he had moved to Calgary. In the 1930s he married Betsy Stirling and they had a daughter Jean. Strachan later commanded the 1st Battalion, Edmonton Fusiliers during the Second World War. After the war he retired and moved to Vancouver. Strachan eventually attained the rank of lieutenant colonel.

In 1967 he voiced his disdain for the U.S. proponents of the U.S.-Vietnam War.

Strachan died on 1 May 1982, at the age of 97 years and 175 days, the record longest-lived recipient of the Victoria Cross. Strachan's ashes were scattered near the Rose Garden Columbarium at Boal Chapel Memorial Gardens in North Vancouver, BC on 5 May.

In September 2013 a lake in Manitoba was named "Harcus Strachan Lake" to commemorate his award of the Victoria Cross. (Winnipeg Free Press, 15 January 2014).

On 20 November 2018, the McGregor Armoury in Winnipeg, home of the Fort Garry Horse, was renamed in honour of Harcus Strachan VC MC.

== See also ==
- List of Canadian Victoria Cross recipients
