= 66th Battalion (Edmonton Guards), CEF =

66th "Overseas" Battalion, CEF
- Active: 1916
- Disbanded: 1920
- Country: Canada
- Branch: Canadian Expeditionary Force
- Type: Infantry
- Battle honours: The Great War, 1916

The 66th Battalion (Edmonton Guards), CEF was an infantry battalion of the Canadian Expeditionary Force during the First World War. The battalion was authorized on 20 April 1915 and embarked for Britain on 28 April 1916. Its personnel were absorbed by the 9th Reserve Battalion, CEF on 7 July 1916 to provide reinforcements for the Canadian Corps in the field. The battalion was disbanded on 30 August 1920.

The battalion recruited in and was mobilized at Edmonton, Alberta. Training occurred at Sarcee Camp, Calgary, Alberta, at the foot of the present-day Battalion Park in the neighbourhood of Signal Hill. The battalion is one of many units whose glyphs, erected on the hillside, no longer exist as a result of a combination of indifference and neglect after the First World War as well as urbanization.

The battalion was commanded by Lieutenant-Colonel J.W.H. McKinery from 1 May 1916 to 14 August 1916.

The battalion was awarded the battle honour The Great War, 1916.

The perpetuation of the 66th Battalion was assigned in 1920 to the 5th Battalion, the Edmonton Regiment. When the Edmonton Regiment was split in 1924, the perpetuation passed to the 2nd Battalion, The Edmonton Fusiliers. The Edmonton Fusiliers are now incorporated (through amalgamations) in the South Alberta Light Horse, which carries on the perpetuation of the 66th Battalion.

== Sources ==
- Canadian Expeditionary Force 1914–1919 by Col. G.W.L. Nicholson, CD, Queen's Printer, Ottawa, Ontario, 1962
