= Operation Cottage =

Allied tactical operation of World War II

- Part of the Aleutian Islands campaign of World War II
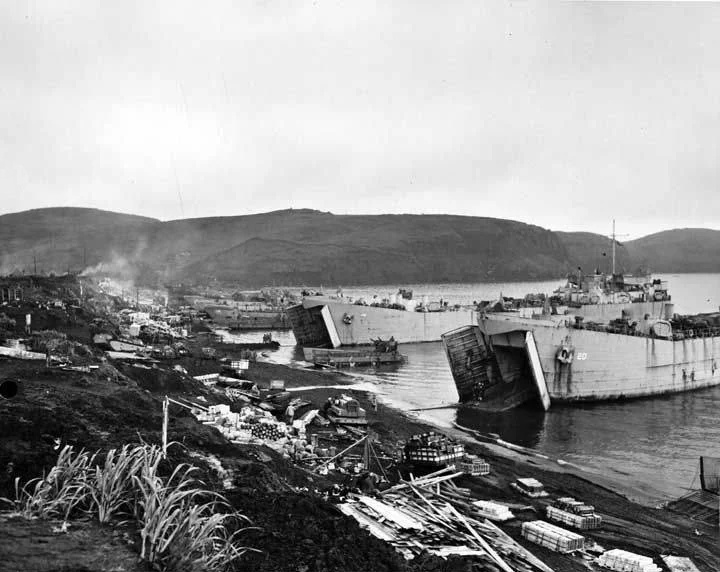
- Landing ships unloading after the landings on Kiska
Date	August 15, 1943
Location	Kiska, Aleutian Islands, Alaska, U.S.
Result	Allied victory

Belligerents
United States; Canada	Japan (not present)

Commanders and leaders
(United States) Charles Corlett (Canada) Harry W. Foster	Not present

Units involved
7th Infantry Division (Note: the 7th Infantry division included the 4th Infantry Regiment, 53rd Infantry Regiment, and 184th Infantry Regiment); 87th Mountain Infantry Regiment (Note: from 10th Mountain Division); US Navy; Task Group 16.22; (Canada) 13th Canadian Infantry Brigade (Note: from 6th Canadian Infantry Division); (Canada) 1st Special Service Force	None present

Strength
(United States) 34,000 (Canada) 5,300	Sea mines, mines, booby traps

Casualties and losses
92 killed 221 wounded Landing forces: 32 killed 100 wounded U.S Navy: 1 destroyer (USS Abner Read) heavily damaged 71 killed 47 wounded	None

Operation Cottage was a joint American-Canadian plan to complete the recapture of the Aleutian Islands from the Japanese in 1943. Allied military forces landed on Kiska Island, which had been occupied by Japanese forces since June 1942. However, the Japanese had secretly abandoned the island two weeks earlier, and so the Allied landings were unopposed. Allied forces suffered over 500 casualties during the operation from Japanese mines and booby traps, friendly fire incidents, and vehicle accidents.

== Background ==
The Japanese under Captain Takeji Ono had landed on Kiska on June 6, 1942 with 500 men of the Special Naval Landing Forces. Soon after arrival, they stormed a United States weather station, where they killed two United States Navy officers. Eight other officers were captured and sent to Japan as prisoners of war. Another 2,000 Japanese landed in Kiska Harbor under Rear Admiral Monzo Akiyama. In December 1942, additional anti-aircraft units, engineers, and a negligible number of reinforcement infantry arrived on the island. In the spring of 1943, control was transferred to Lt. General Kiichiro Higuchi.

After suffering heavy casualties at Attu Island, Japanese planners expected another costly operation. They realized the isolated Kiska Island was no longer defensible and planned for an evacuation.

Starting in late July, there were increasing signs of Japanese withdrawal. Aerial photograph analysts noticed that routine activities appeared greatly diminished, and almost no movement could be detected in the harbor. Bomb damage appeared unrepaired, and aircrews reported greatly diminished anti-aircraft fire. On July 28, radio signals from Kiska ceased entirely.

The Japanese had evacuated the remnants of the garrison - over 5,000 troops - under cover of fog while the naval blockade was interrupted for refuelling. They left behind numerous mines, booby traps, and timed explosives.

Bombardment of the island by warships and aircraft continued in the first weeks of August.

== Invasion plan and execution ==
The Allied invasion of Kiska, August 15–16, 1943

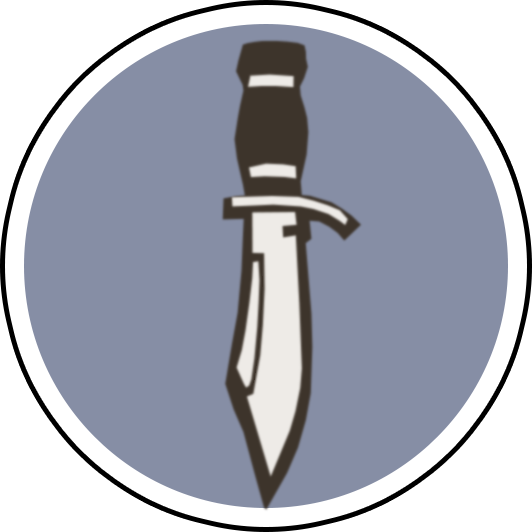
Task Force Kiska SSI

An Allied invasion force was prepared drawing on the U.S. 7th Infantry Division, the 87th Mountain Infantry Regiment (from the 10th Mountain Division) and the 13th Canadian Infantry Brigade (from the 6th Canadian Infantry Division). The Canadian brigade included battalions from the Canadian Fusiliers; the Winnipeg Grenadiers; the Rocky Mountain Rangers; and a company from the Saint John Fusiliers. The invasion would also be the first combat deployment of the First Special Service Force, an elite special forces unit consisting of American and Canadian commandos. Training for the amphibious attack, under the codename Operation Greenlight, began around Adak in mid-July in order to prepare the troops for the conditions they would experience.

The naval component in support of operations included three battleships, one heavy cruiser, one light cruiser, 19 destroyers, and five attack transports as well as transports and landing ships and landing craft. USS U. S. Grant was the advanced command post of Major general Charles Corlett for the landings, USS Pennsylvania carried the Commander Attack Force, Admiral Rockwell.

The plan was for naval bombardment and a feint by transport ships from the south and east of Kiska to misdirect the defenders while the actual force landed from the north and west.

On August 15, the first force landed on the north western shore of Kiska. Units advanced inland expecting a determined defence. The commandos had already landed to secure high ground on their southern flank the previous night. On August 16, the transports which had formed the decoy landed their troops on the western shore of the northern part of the island.

After a Canadian soldier shot at U.S. lines believing they were Japanese, a friendly fire incident occurred, which left 28 Americans and 4 Canadians dead, with 50 wounded on either side. Progress was also hampered by mines, timed bombs, accidental ammunition detonations, vehicle accidents, and booby traps that caused further casualties.

The USN destroyer USS Abner Read in the night of 17/18th reversed into a stray Japanese sea mine. The explosion caused the stern of the ship to break away and killed 71 with a further 47 of its officers and men wounded.

The operation was detailed in a 1944 book, First Steps to Tokyo, by RCAF flight officer David Griffin.

== Gallery ==
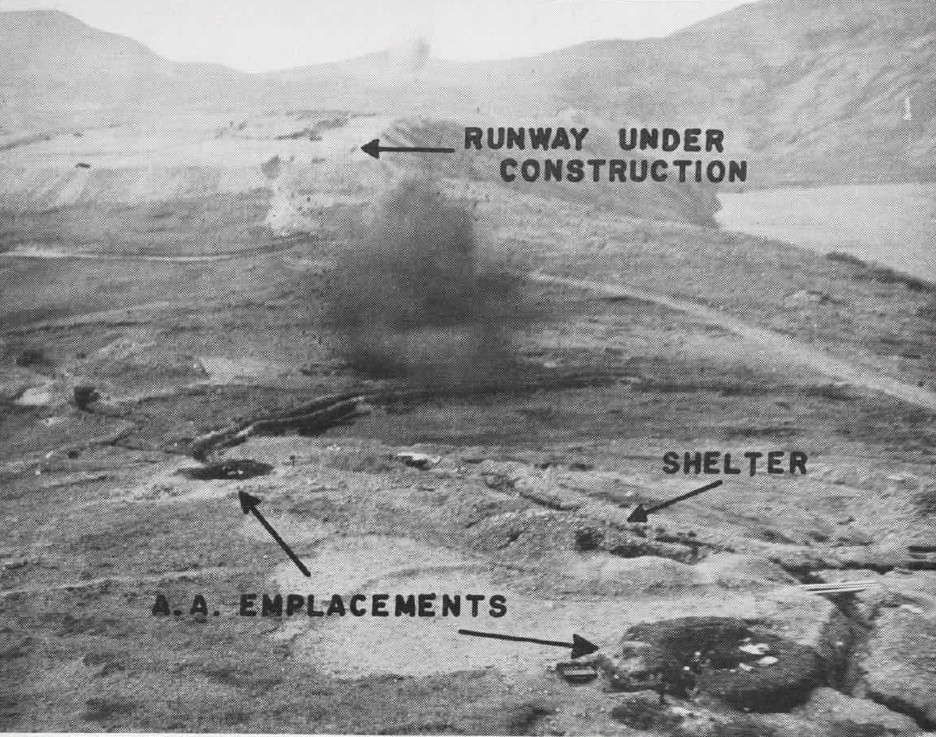
Aerial reconnaissance photo of the Japanese-held Aleutian Island of Kiska, taken in 1943

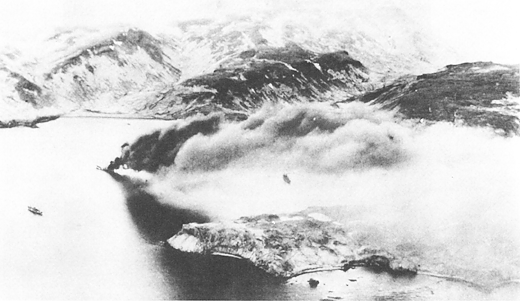
Japanese transport ship burning off Kiska, Alaska, after U.S. attack on 18 June 1942

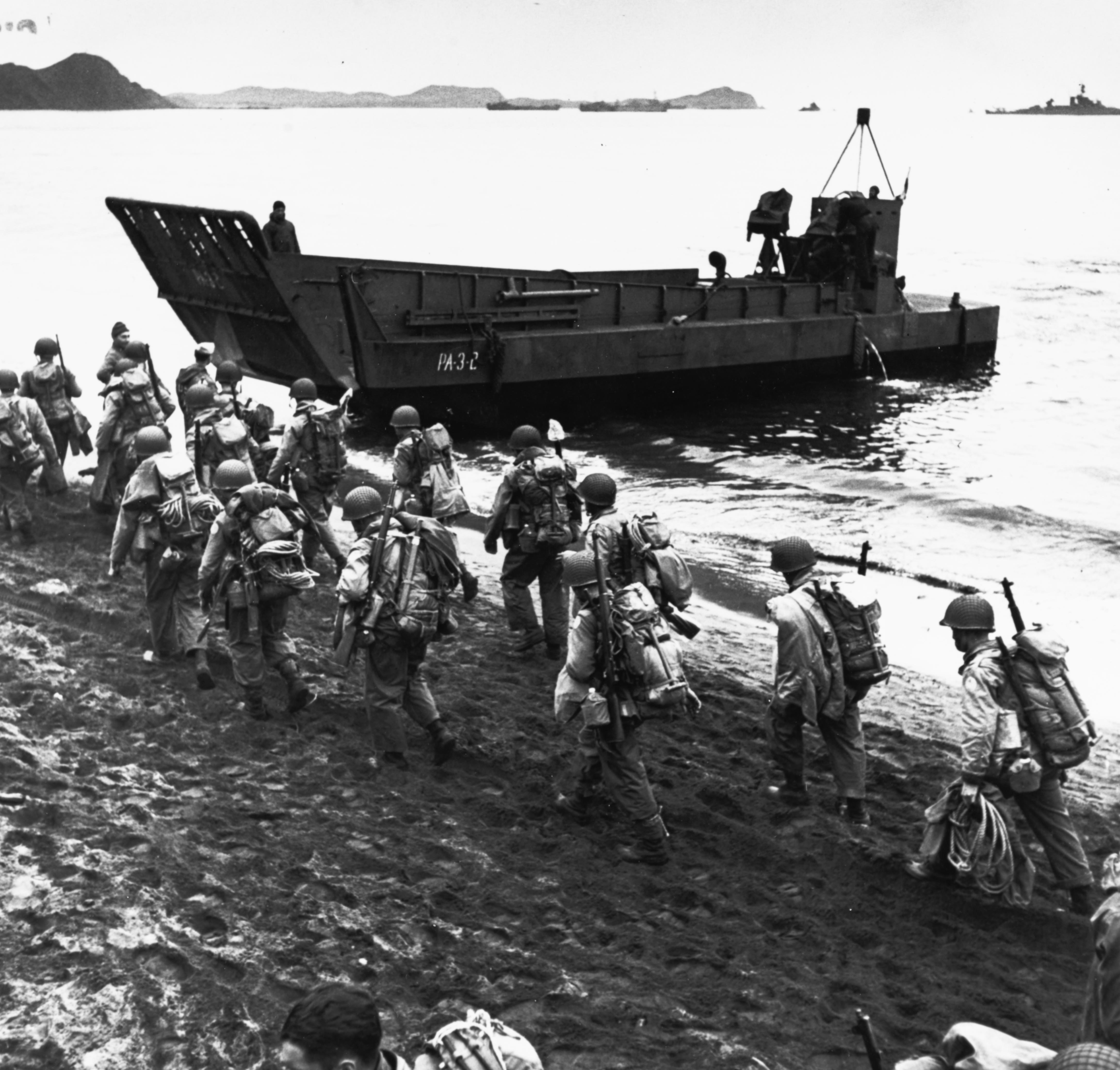
Troops march up the beach at Adak, during pre-invasion loading for the Kiska Operation, 13 August 1943.

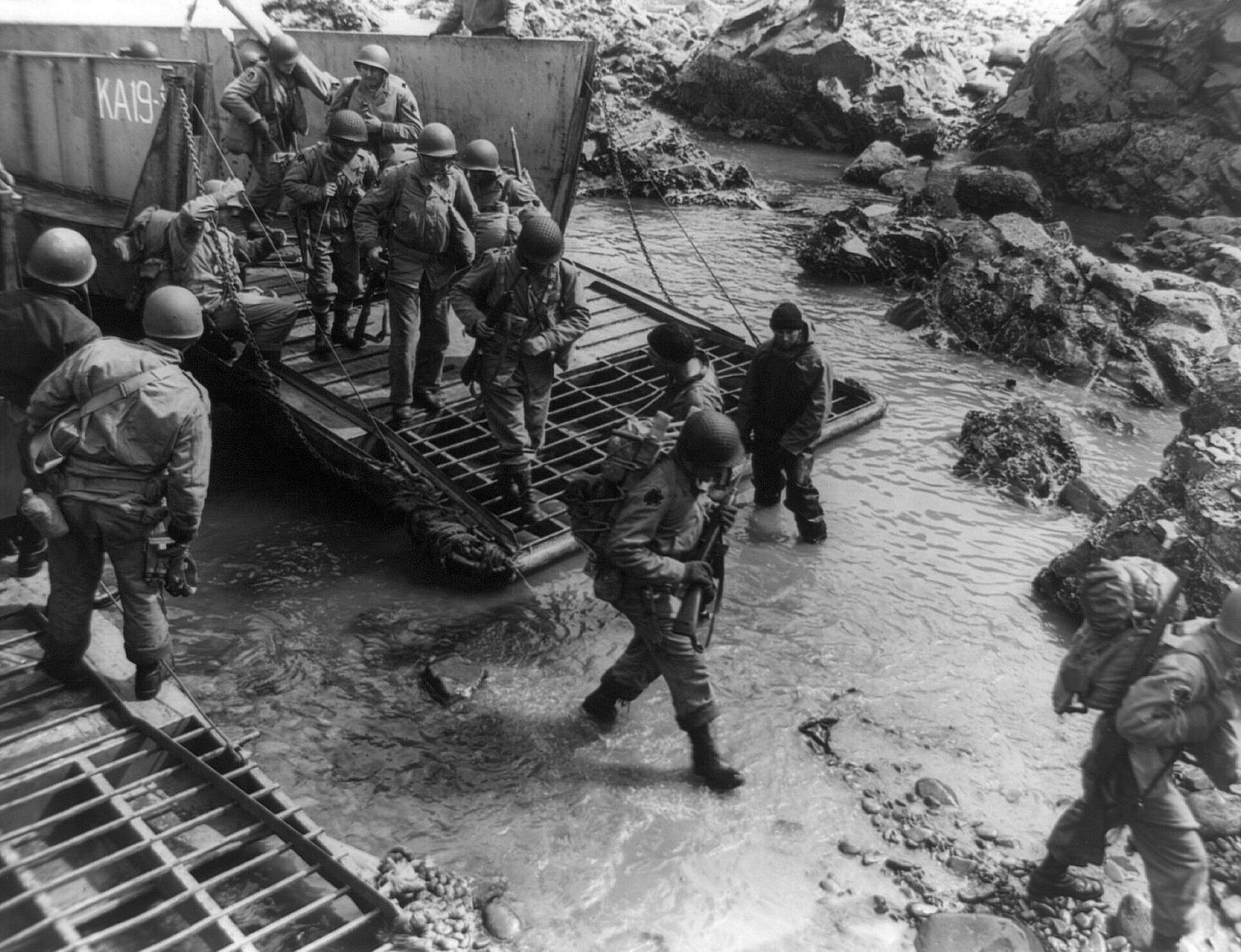
U.S. soldiers getting off their landing craft onto the rocky shores of Kiska Island

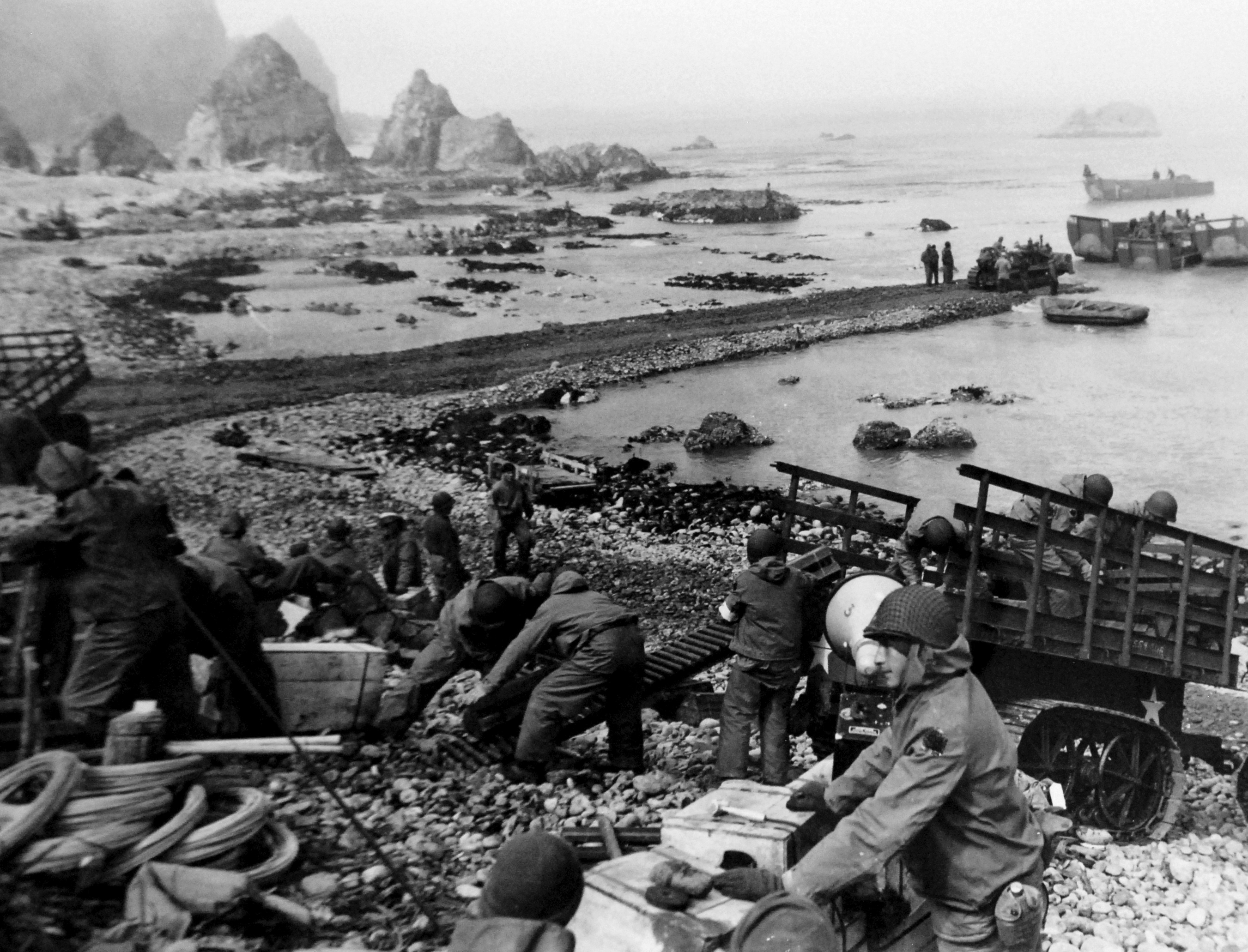
Allied Landing on Kiska Island

== See also ==
- Friendly fire incidents of World War II
