= 202nd (Sportsman's) Battalion, CEF =

202nd "Overseas" Battalion, CEF
- Active: 1916–1917
- Country: Canada
- Branch: Canadian Expeditionary Force
- Type: Infantry
- Battle honours: The Great War, 1916–17

Commanders
- Officer commanding: Lieutenant-Colonel Peter Edwin Bowen

The 202nd (Sportsmens) Battalion, CEF was a unit in the Canadian Expeditionary Force during the First World War. Based in southside Edmonton, Alberta, the unit began recruiting during the winter of 1915/16 in that city and surrounding district. It was formally authorized on July 15, 1916. Its headquarters were in the Sheppard Block at 10316 Whyte Avenue.

Training occurred at Sarcee Camp, Calgary, Alberta, at the foot of what is now Battalion Park in the neighbourhood of Signal Hill. The battalion is one of many units whose glyphs, erected on the hillside, no longer exist as a result of a combination of indifference and neglect after the First World War as well as urbanization.

After sailing to England on November 23, 1916, the battalion was absorbed into the 9th Reserve Battalion on May 27, 1917. The 202nd (Sportsmens) Battalion, CEF, had one commanding officer during its time in existence: Lieutenant-Colonel Peter Edwin Bowen, one of Alberta's best-known sportsman and one of the province's best rifle and trap shots.

The flying ace Wop May was a member of the battalion before transferring to the Royal Flying Corps. Alex Decoteau, Edmonton's and Canada's first indigenous police officer, also volunteered for the 202nd Battalion. The politician Gordon MacDonald served with the battalion while a member of the Alberta legislature.

The regimental colour of the 202nd Battalion is laid up in the rotunda of the Alberta Legislature Building in Edmonton.

The perpetuation of the 202nd Battalion was assigned to the Edmonton Fusiliers in 1924. This regiment merged into the 19th (Alberta) Armoured Car Regiment, RCAC, in 1946. The 19th in turn amalgamated into the South Alberta Light Horse in 2006, and the SALH now perpetuates the 202nd Battalion.

In 1929, the battalion was awarded the theatre of war honour The Great War, 1916–17.
