= Robert T. Anderson (poet) =

Canadian poet (1880–1960)

Robert T. Anderson MM
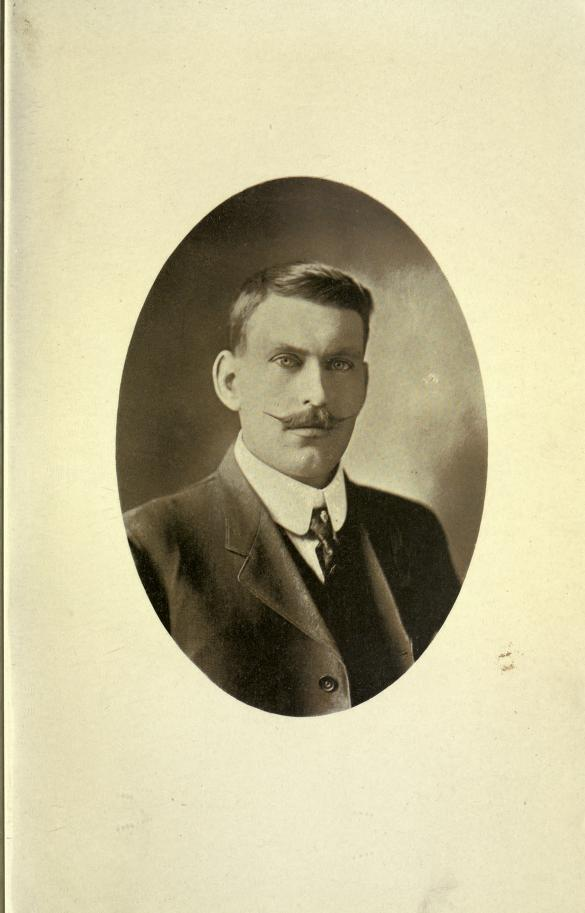
- Photograph of Anderson from the frontispiece of The Old Timer and Other Poems, 1909
- Born: 2 August 1880; Rapid City, Manitoba, Canada
- Died: 3 April 1960 (aged 79); Edmonton, Alberta, Canada
- Occupations: Poet, health inspector, soldier, firefighter, commissionaire

Robert Thompson Anderson MM (August 2, 1880 – April 3, 1960) was a Canadian poet.

== Biography ==
Robert Thompson Anderson was born on 2 August 1880 in Rapid City, Manitoba, to William Anderson and Jane Struthers as one of four children. In 1897, the family moved to Lemon Creek, British Columbia in the Slocan Valley. In 1905, Anderson moved to Edmonton, Alberta, and became the fourth member of staff with the Edmonton fire department in 1906. He served overseas in the cavalry in World War I with the 19th Alberta Dragoons. Anderson served for the full duration of the war and received the Military Medal in 1916 for gallantry while on a reconnaissance patrol. He was also promoted to lance corporal in 1918 but was later reverted to private at his own request. Anderson lived in Edmonton until his death; dying on 3 April 1960 at the age of seventy-nine and was buried in Westlawn Cemetery. He was sometimes known as the "Kipling of the Kooteneays" and "the Bard of Lemon Creek."

Anderson showed an early interest in poetry; although his formal education ended at Grade 4, he was already composing poems in his late teens. He primarily wrote poems in English but also wrote in French Canadian and Scottish dialects. Anderson wrote in rhymed iambic verse.

Anderson's poetry collection Troopers in France (1932) was described at "filled with thoughtful and sometimes bitter poems about the tragedy of war." Other collections include Old Timers and Other Poems (published in 1909 by the Edmonton Printing and Publishing Co.) and Canadian Born and Other Poems (published in 1913 by Esdale Press). These were the first actual books of poetry to be published in Alberta and are of a more northern sensibility in comparison to other contemporary western writers like Rhoda Sivell and Robert J.C. Stead.

== Published works ==
- The Old Timer and Other Poems (1909)
- Canadian Born and Other Western Verse (1913)
- Troopers in France (1932)
