= 3rd Regiment, Canadian Mounted Rifles =

- Active: 1914–1916
- Country: Canada
- Branch: Canadian Expeditionary Force
- Type: Mounted infantry
- Role: Mounted infantry
- Size: One regiment
- Battle honours: France and Flanders, 1915

The 3rd Regiment, Canadian Mounted Rifles, CEF, was a mounted infantry unit of the Canadian Expeditionary Force in the First World War.

== History ==
The regiment was formed in November 1914 at Medicine Hat and recruited personnel in Alberta. It sailed from Montreal to England on 12 June 1915 aboard the Megantic, and after training arrived in France on September 22, 1915. It served in the field as dismounted infantry until December 1915.

On January 1, 1916, the six regiments of the Canadian Mounted Rifles were converted to infantry and reorganized into the four battalions of the 8th Canadian Infantry Brigade. The personnel of the 3rd Regiment were absorbed into the 1st and the 2nd Battalions, CMR.

== Perpetuation ==
In 1920, the perpetuation of the 3rd Regiment CMR was assigned to 1st Regiment, the Alberta Mounted Rifles, and it is now held by the South Alberta Light Horse. The 3rd CMR, along with the 175th Battalion, CEF, is commemorated by white hillside glyphs ("3CMR 175") in Medicine Hat.

- 1st Regiment (3rd Canadian Mounted Rifles Battalion, CEF), The Alberta Mounted Rifles (1920–1931)
- 1st Regiment (3rd Regiment Canadian Mounted Rifles, CEF), The Alberta Mounted Rifles (1931–1936)
- 19th Alberta Dragoons (1936–1946)
- 19th (Alberta) Armoured Car Regiment, RCAC (1946–1949)
- 19th Alberta Armoured Car Regiment, RCAC (1949–1954)
- 19th Alberta Dragoons (19th Armoured Car Regiment) (1954–1958)
- 19th Alberta Dragoons (1958–2006)
- The South Alberta Light Horse (2006–present)

== See also ==
- List of mounted regiments in the Canadian Expeditionary Force
