= Commonwealth Corps =

- Active: Proposed for 1946
- Country: Australia; Canada; United Kingdom; New Zealand
- Allegiance: Allies/British Commonwealth
- Branch: Army
- Type: Infantry
- Size: 3 divisions

The Commonwealth Corps was the name given to a proposed British Commonwealth army formation, which was scheduled to take part in the planned Allied invasion of Japan during 1945 and 1946. The corps was never formed, however, as the Japanese surrender obviated any need for it. Under the proposals the corps would have comprised Australian, British, Canadian and New Zealand forces.

== Proposal ==
Planning by General of the Army Douglas MacArthur, as supreme commander of Allied forces, for Operation Olympic—as the initial landings on Kyūshū in late 1945 were to be known—revolved around land forces composed entirely of US Army and Marine Corps units. However, the Australian Advisory War Council suggested to MacArthur that the significant involvement of Australian Army units in the Pacific War over the previous three years meant that they should be involved in landings on Kyushu; nevertheless, the Australian government was considering the attachment of smaller units to US formations. The aircraft carriers and battleships of a combined Commonwealth fleet, known as the British Pacific Fleet, were to be involved in Olympic, along with Australian cruisers and destroyers that had been integrated into US Navy task forces (since 1942).

In addition, a 10-squadron Commonwealth heavy bomber force composed of two groups (one RCAF and one RAF-RAAF-RNZAF) in Europe and was to be based on Okinawa, under the code name "Tiger Force". The 12-squadron Australian First Tactical Air Force may have been transferred from the South-West Pacific, as might the heavy bombers of No. 11 Group RAAF.

By mid-1945, United Kingdom leaders were proposing that a combined Commonwealth corps comprising five divisions be assembled in India, and that they be introduced to the campaign in Operation Coronet – landings on Honshu, near Tokyo Bay, during March 1946. By the time of the Potsdam Conference, however, MacArthur was insisting that only three divisions should be part of the combined Commonwealth corps, as part of a US army-level formation. MacArthur also proposed that: the corps should be kept in reserve rather than taking part in initial landings; it should not include Indian Army units, due to "linguistic and administrative complications", and; in the interests of rationalising lines of supply, the Commonwealth divisions should be re-organised to resemble US divisions, as well as being trained and equipped with US weapons, vehicles and other key equipment. Besides questions of American national prestige, which undoubtedly weighed heavily, behind these conditions was a desire to simplify the lines of communication and the logistic support arrangements of the invasion force. Indeed, once established in Japan MacArthur intended to switch his strategic lines of communication direct to America.

On 8 August, the Chief of the Imperial General Staff (CIGS), Field Marshal Sir Alan Brooke, proposed that the corps comprise one Australian, one British and one Canadian division, as well as two New Zealand brigades. The corps was to be formed in the United States and train there for six months before deployment, and would have also been organised along the lines of a US corps and utilise American equipment. It is generally considered that the corps was to have included the already established British 3rd Infantry Division, and two Australian and Canadian divisions being re-raised for the purpose of the invasion: the Australian 10th Infantry Division, and the 6th Canadian Infantry Division.

British leaders were proposing that the corps be led by Lieutenant General Sir Charles Keightley, a British officer. The Australian government disagreed with the appointment of an officer with no experience fighting the Japanese, and instead proposed Lieutenant General Sir Leslie Morshead for the command. The details of the corps' deployment were still being discussed when the war was ended by the atomic bombings of Hiroshima and Nagasaki, although it appears that the Commonwealth land forces would not have been used in the initial landings on Kyūshū under Operation Olympic. Instead they would most likely have been used during the landings on Honshu, near Tokyo, which were scheduled to begin on 1 March 1946 under Operation Coronet, and which would have also included a French Corps. Regardless, some sources state that MacArthur was proposing the further reduction of the Commonwealth land forces to an elite division. However, considering the likelihood of extremely high casualties in any such invasion, it must be considered likely that a much larger number of Commonwealth troops would have become involved following the landings.

== Composition ==
=== Canadian ===
The Canadian Army Pacific Force was organized on the lines of a standard infantry division, with nine infantry battalions. However, to ease logistic concerns, U.S. military equipment was to be adopted, as well as U.S. Army organization. Therefore, three battalions were formed into "regiments" rather than brigades, and "cannon companies" were formed rather than anti-tank units. The battalions were named in Canadian fashion, rather than numbered, and the division was patterned after the 1st Canadian Infantry Division.
