= 22nd Field Battery, RCA =

The 22nd Field Battery, RCA, was a reserve artillery unit stationed in Gleichen, Alberta, from 1920 to 1946. The battery perpetuates the legacy of the World War I unit, the 22nd (Howitzer) Battery, Canadian Field Artillery, Canadian Expeditionary Force. It is also counted as one of the ancestors of the South Alberta Light Horse, one of Alberta's two remaining Armoured Reserve units (along with the King's Own Calgary Regiment.)

The regiment was initially authorized by the Government of Canada on 2 February 1920. The unit was subsequently re-designated as the 22nd Field Battery, CA on 1 July 1925. In 1927 it was perpetuated as part of the Alberta Light Horse. The unit was again later re-designated as the 22nd Field Battery, RCA on 3 June 1935.

On 7 November 1940, the unit was yet again re-designated to 22nd (Reserve) Field Battery, RCA.

After World War II ended, the battery returned to reserve status in Gleichen, and was re-designated back to 22nd Field Battery, RCA. The next year, 1 April 1946, it was amalgamated into the 15th Alberta Light Horse.

The 22nd Battery RCA was a sponsor of the first official hockey team in Gleichen, the "Gunners."
