= Connaught Armoury =

Connaught (Strathcona) Armoury
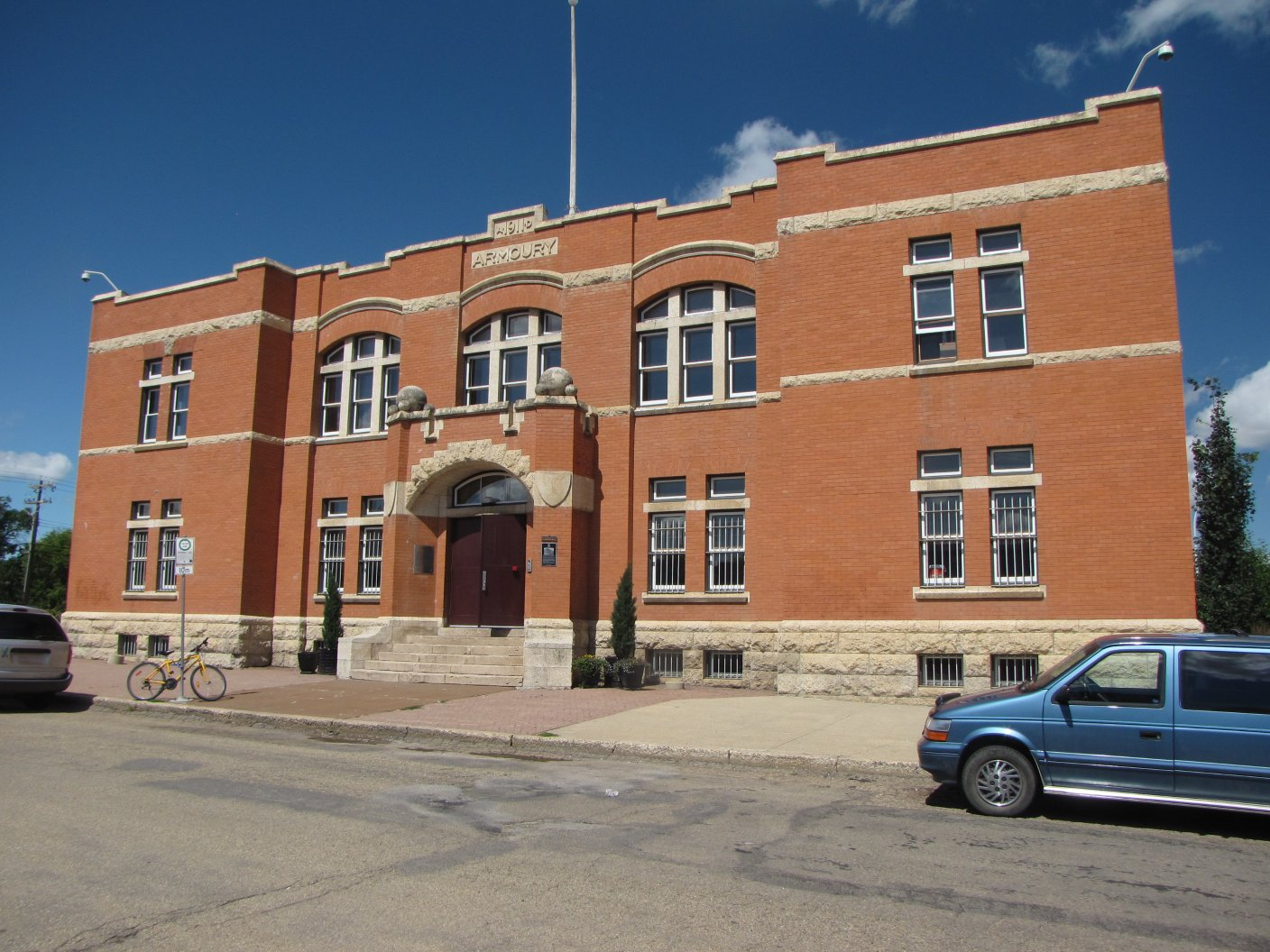
- Connaught (Strathcona) Armoury

- Location within Edmonton

General information
- Type: Drill Hall / armoury
- Architectural style: fortress-like appearance
- Location: two lots along 85 Avenue Edmonton, Alberta, Canada, 10310 85 Avenue, Edmonton, Canada
- Coordinates: 53°31′16″N 113°29′45″W
- Current tenants: Vacant
- Construction started: 1911
- Cost: $35,000
- Client: B Squadron of the 19th Alberta Dragoons
- Owner: Edmonton

Technical details
- Structural system: brick and sandstone construction – stylized crenellations on the roof line, heavy brick and masonry walls, and formal entry porch.

Design and construction
- Awards and prizes: Canada's Register of Historic Places Edmonton Historical Board Plaque Award; Municipal Historic Resource (2007/03/06); Provincial Historic Resource (1979/02/16)

The Connaught Armoury is a former armoury at 10310 85 Avenue in Edmonton, Alberta, Canada. This building was built in 1911–1912 in what was then the City of Strathcona at a cost of $35,000. The early twentieth century, two-storey, rectangular brick building is the oldest armoury in Alberta.

== Facilities ==
In addition to a main-floor drill hall, it incorporated storerooms for arms, saddles and uniforms; offices and a caretaker's apartment. In the basement, the drill hall had a rifle range and bowling alley.

== History ==
The Edmonton Historical Board Plaque states: "Edmonton is home to several armoury buildings, reflecting the importance of the armed forces in our city's history. The Connaught Armoury was built in what was then the City of Strathcona in 1911–12. It was named for Prince Arthur, Duke of Connaught and Strathearn, the third son of Queen Victoria and Canada's Governor-General from 1911 to 1916."

The armoury was built to house the B Squadron of the 19th Alberta Dragoons. The 19th Alberta Dragoons was a cavalry and later armoured regiment which served during the First World War and in the Second World War. After the Second World War, it became the 19th Alberta Armoured Car Regiment. When the Dragoons were reduced to nil strength and placed on the Supplementary Order of Battle in February 1965, the City of Edmonton acquired the armoury from the federal government.

== Legacy ==
The building was vacant for 14 years. The building has been leased to various restaurants over the years, but they did not succeed. The Strathcona Legion Branch 150 requested the use of the armoury after the building they were occupying became too expensive to continue using. However, City Council decided to use the building as a drop-in centre for the Youth Emergency Shelter Society. The building has been vacant since May 2024, and the City of Edmonton listed it for sale in July 2025.

== See also ==
- List of Armouries in Canada
- Royal eponyms in Canada
