= 138th (Edmonton, Alberta) Battalion, CEF =

138th "Overseas" Battalion, CEF
- Active: 1915–1916
- Country: Canada
- Branch: Canadian Expeditionary Force
- Type: Infantry
- Mobilization headquarters: Edmonton
- Battle honours: The Great War, 1916

Commanders
- Officer commanding: LCol Robert Belcher

The 138th Battalion, CEF, was a unit in the Canadian Expeditionary Force during the First World War.

Based in Edmonton, Alberta, the unit began recruiting in late 1915 in that city. After sailing to England in August 1916, the battalion was absorbed into the 47th, 50th, 137th, and 175th Battalions, CEF, on December 8, 1916. The 138th Battalion, CEF, had one officer commanding: Lieutenant-Colonel Robert Belcher.

The Otter Commission assigned the perpetuation of the 138th Battalion to the Edmonton Fusiliers in 1929. This regiment merged into the 19th (Alberta) Armoured Car Regiment, RCAC, in 1946. The 19th in turn amalgamated into the South Alberta Light Horse in 2006, and the SALH now perpetuates the 138th Battalion.

Lineage of perpetuating units:

- 1929–1936: 4th (Reserve) Battalion (138th Battalion, CEF) The Edmonton Fusiliers
- 1936–1946: The Edmonton Fusiliers (MG)
- 1946–1949: 19th (Alberta) Armoured Car Regiment, RCAC
- 1949–1954: 19th Alberta Armoured Car Regiment
- 1954–1958: 19th Alberta Dragoons (19th Armoured Car Regiment)
- 1958–2006: 19th Alberta Dragoons
- 2006–present: South Alberta Light Horse

In 1929, the battalion was awarded the theatre of war honour The Great War, 1916.
