= Brockville Rifles =

The Brockville Rifles
- Cap badge
- Active: 1866-present
- Country: Canada
- Branch: Primary Reserve
- Type: Rifles
- Role: Light infantry
- Size: One battalion
- Part of: Royal Canadian Infantry Corps
- Garrison/HQ: Brockville
- Motto: Semper paratus
- March: "Bonnie Dundee"
- Anniversaries: Regimental birthday - 5 October 1866
- Engagements: Fenian Raids; First World War; Second World War; War in Afghanistan
- Battle honours: See #Battle honours
- Website: canada.ca/en/army/corporate/4-canadian-division/the-brockville-rifles.html

Commanders
- Current commander: LCol Sean McDonaugh

The Brockville Rifles is a Primary Reserve infantry regiment of the Canadian Army. The unit is a part of the 33 Canadian Brigade Group, 2nd Canadian Division. It is fifteenth in the order of precedence of Canadian Army Infantry Regiments.

== Badge ==
=== Description ===
A hunting horn is hung from a silver cord in the center of a gules (red) background, all of which is in a silver-bordered black ring with "The Brockville Rifles" inscribed in silver, all centered on a silver-and-black Maltese cross whose upper branch reads "Amiens" and the lower branch reads "Pursuit to Mons," both in silver. Over the cross is a crown.

=== Symbolism ===
The Maltese cross and the bugle are typical among badges of light infantry and rifle regiments. "The Brockville Rifles" is the regimental title, and "Amiens" and "Pursuit to Mons" are battle honors from the First World War. The crown represents service to the Crown.

== Lineage ==
=== The Brockville Rifles ===
- Originated on 5 October 1866, in Brockville, Canada West, as the 41st Brockville Battalion of Rifles
- Redesignated on 8 May 1900, as the 41st Regiment "Brockville Rifles
- Redesignated on 12 March 1920, as The Brockville Rifles
- Redesignated on 18 March 1942, as the 2nd (Reserve) Battalion, The Brockville Rifles
- Converted on 1 April 1946, to Artillery and Redesignated as the 60th Light Anti-Aircraft Regiment (Brockville Rifles), RCA
- Amalgamated on 1 September 1954, with the 32nd Anti-Tank Battery (Self-Propelled), RCA, and Redesignated as the 32nd Locating Battery (Brockville Rifles), RCA
- Converted on 1 December 1959, to Infantry and Redesignated as The Brockville Rifles

=== 32nd Anti-Tank Battery (Self-Propelled), RCA ===
- Originated on 14 November 1855, in Kingston, Canada West, as the Volunteer Militia Company of Foot Artillery of Kingston
- Redesignated on 29 May 1856, as the Volunteer Militia Field Battery of Artillery of Kingston
- Redesignated on 1 July 1894, as the No. 5 "Kingston" Field Battery
- Redesignated on 28 December 1895, as the 5th "Kingston" Field Battery, CA
- Redesignated on 2 February 1920, as the 32nd (Kingston) Battery, CFA
- Redesignated on 1 July 1925, as the 32nd (Kingston) Field Battery, CA
- Redesignated on 3 June 1935, as the 32nd (Kingston) Field Battery, RCA
- Redesignated on 7 November 1940, as the 32nd (Reserve) (Kingston) Field Battery, RCA
- Redesignated on 24 June 1942, as the 3rd/32nd (Reserve) Field Battery, RCA
- Redesignated on 15 May 1943, as the 32nd (Reserve) Anti-Aircraft Battery (Type 2H), RCA
- Redesignated on 1 September 1943, as the 3rd/32nd (Reserve) Field Battery, RCA
- Redesignated on 1 April 1946, as the 32nd Anti-Tank Battery (Self-Propelled), RCA
- Amalgamated on 1 September 1954, with the 60th Light Anti-Aircraft Regiment (Brockville Rifles), RCA

=== Lineage chart ===
Lineage chart

1812	Bn of Incorporated Militia of Upper Canada	1st and 2nd Regts of Leeds Militia
1815	Disbanded	Disbanded
1855	Independent rifle coys	Volunteer Militia Coy of Foot Arty of Kingston
1856	Volunteer Militia Fd Bty of Arty of Kingston
1866	41st "Brockville Bn of Rifles"
1894	No. 5 "Kingston" Fd Bty
1895	5th "Kingston" Fd Bty, CA
1900	41st Regt "Brockville Rifles"
1915	156th "Overseas" Bn, CEF	32nd "Overseas" Bty, CFA, CEF
1918	Absorbed by 6th Reserve Bn, CEF
1920	1st Bn (156th Bn, CEF), The Brockville Rifles	2nd Bn, (Note: Reserve) The Brockville Rifles	Disbanded	32nd (Kingston) Bty, CFA (Note: 9th Brigade, CFA)
1925	32nd (Kingston) Fd Bty, CA (Note: 9th Brigade, CA)
1935
1936	The Brockville Rifles	Disbanded
1940	32nd (Reserve) (Kingston) Fd Bty, RCA (Note: 9th (Reserve) Brigade, RCA)
1940	32nd/34th Fd Bty, RCA, CASF	3rd/32nd (Reserve) Fd Bty, RCA
1941	32nd (Kingston) LAA Bty, RCA, CASF (Note: 4th Light Anti-Aircraft Regiment, RCA, CASF)	34th Fd Bty, RCA, CASF
1942	1st Bn, The Brockville Rifles, CASF	2nd (Reserve) Bn, The Brockville Rifles
1943	32nd (Reserve) Anti-Aircraft Bty (Type 2H), RCA
1943	3rd/32nd (Reserve) Fd Bty, RCA
1945	Disbanded	2nd 32nd LAA Bty, RCA, CAOF (Note: 2nd-4th Light Anti-Aircraft Regiment, RCA, CASF)
1946	Disbanded	60th LAA Regt (Brockville Rifles), RCA	Disbanded	32nd Anti-Tank Bty (Self-Propelled), RCA (Note: 9th Anti-Tank Regiment (Self-Propelled) (Argyll Light Infantry), RCA)
1954	32nd Locating Bty (Brockville Rifles), RCA (Note: 1st Artillery Locating Regiment, RCA)
1959	The Brockville Rifles
2012	Perpetuates War of 1812 units

== Perpetuations ==
The Brockville Rifles perpetuate the Battalion of Incorporated Militia of Upper Canada; the 1st and 2nd regiments of Leeds Militia (1812–15); the 156th Battalion, CEF; and 32nd Battery, Canadian Field Artillery, CEF.

The Brockville Rifles perpetuate units dating back to 1796 with the formation of the 1st Battalion, Leeds Militia at Elizabethtown (later Brockville). At its peak, Leeds County had raised a total of nine battalions. During the War of 1812, regiments that the Brockville Rifles perpetuate were involved in the capture of Ogdensburg and the Battle of Crysler's Farm.

== Operational history ==
=== Fenian Raids ===
The 41st Brockville Battalion of Rifles was called out on active service from 24 May 1870 to 1 June 1870 and served on the St. Lawrence River frontier.

=== Great War ===
The 156th Battalion (Leeds and Grenville), CEF, was authorized on 22 December 1915 and embarked for Britain on 19 October 1916, where, on 1 November 1916, the battalion's personnel were absorbed by the 109th Battalion (Victoria & Haliburton), CEF; 119th Battalion (Algoma), CEF; 120th Battalion (City of Hamilton), CEF; 123rd Battalion (Royal Grenadiers), CEF; and 124th Battalion (Governor General's Body Guard), CEF. On 27 December 1916, the battalion was reformed to provide reinforcements to the Canadian Corps in the field until being absorbed by the 6th Reserve Battalion, CEF, on 15 February 1918. The battalion was disbanded on 29 November 1918.

The 32nd Battery, CFA, CEF, was authorized on 15 August 1915 and embarked for Britain on 5 February 1916, disembarking in France on 14 July 1916, where it fought as part of the 9th Brigade, CFA, CEF, from 15 July 1916 to 1 July 1917, and subsequently with the 8th Army Brigade, CFA, in France and Flanders, from 5 July 1917 until the end of the war. The battery was disbanded on 23 October 1920.

=== Second World War ===
The regiment mobilized the 1st Battalion, The Brockville Rifles, CASF, on 18 March 1942. It served in Canada in a home defence role as part of the 13th Infantry Brigade, 6th Canadian Division, and in Jamaica on garrison duty from 5 August 1944 to 27 March 1946. The battalion was disbanded on 30 April 1946.

The regiment provided No. 2 Company of The Stormont, Dundas and Glengarry Highlanders, CASF, for active service on 24 May 1940.

The 32nd (Kingston) Field Battery, RCA, in conjunction with the 34th Field Battery, RCA, mobilized the 32nd/34th Field Battery, RCA, CASF, on 24 May 1940. This unit was reorganized as two separate batteries on 1 January 1941, designated the 32nd (Kingston) Field Battery, RCA, CASF, and the 34th Field Battery, RCA, CASF, (which was redesignated the 32nd (Kingston) Light Anti-Aircraft Battery, RCA, CASF, on the same day). It provided light anti-aircraft artillery support as part of the 4th Light Anti-Aircraft Regiment, RCA, CASF, in North-West Europe until the end of the war. The overseas battery was disbanded on 13 November 1945. The battery subsequently mobilized the 2nd/32nd Light Anti-Aircraft Battery, RCA, Canadian Army Occupation Force, on 1 June 1945, for active service with the Canadian Army Occupation Force in Germany. The battery was disbanded on 4 April 1946.

=== War in Afghanistan ===
The regiment contributed an aggregate of more than 20% of its authorized strength to the various task forces which served in Afghanistan between 2002 and 2014.

== History ==
=== Early history ===
The Brockville Rifles originated in Brockville, Canada West, on 5 October 1866, when the 41st Brockville Battalion of Rifles was authorized with six companies: 1 Company was in Brockville, 2 Company was in Gananoque, 3 Company was in Perth, 4 Company was in Merrickville, 5 Company was in Carleton Place, and 6 Company was in Pakenham. It was designated the 41st Regiment "Brockville Rifles" on 8 May 1900; The Brockville Rifles on 12 March 1920; and the 2nd (Reserve) Battalion, The Brockville Rifles on 18 March 1942.

=== First World War ===
On 22 December 1915, during World War I, the 156th Leeds & Grenville Battalion, Canadian Expeditionary Force, was authorized. The unit moved to England as part of the proposed 5th Canadian Division. However, a pressing need for troops and reinforcements on the front caused the disbanding of the unit; and its men were transferred to other units.

=== 1920s–1930s ===
Following World War I, the regiment was once again designated The Brockville Rifles. In April 1926, the Colonel Commandant of the King's Royal Rifle Corps invited the unit to ally with them. Today, following a series of amalgamations within the British Army, The Brockville Rifles are allied with The Rifles.

=== Second World War ===
On 24 May 1940, during World War II, the regiment provided No. 2 Company of The Stormont, Dundas and Glengarry Highlanders, Canadian Active Service Force. On 18 March 1942, the regiment mobilized the 1st Battalion, The Brockville Rifles, into the Canadian Active Service Force. It served in Canada, in a home defence role, as part of the 13th Infantry Brigade, 6th Canadian Division, and, from 5 August 1944 to 27 March 1946, in Jamaica on garrison duty. On 30 April 1946, the battalion was disbanded. The 2nd (Reserve) Battalion served on a part-time basis in the Reserve Army at home, in Brockville.

=== Post War ===
On 1 April 1946, The regiment (the "Brocks") was converted to artillery and redesignated the 60th Light Anti-Aircraft Regiment (Brockville Rifles), RCA. On 1 September 1954, it was amalgamated with the 32nd Anti-Tank Battery (Self-Propelled), RCA, and redesignated as the 32nd Locating Battery (Brockville Rifles), RCA. On 1 December 1959, it once again reverted to infantry and was redesignated The Brockville Rifles.

Since the end of the Second World War, Members of The Brockville Rifles have served on operations in Afghanistan, Bosnia, The Former Republic of Georgia, among other deployments. The unit prepares soldiers to be employable as effective individual augmentees to Canadian Forces operations and deployments.

== Alliances ==
- United Kingdom - The Rifles

== Battle honours ==
In the list below, battle honours in capitals were awarded for participation in large operations and campaigns. Those in lowercase indicate those granted for more specific battles.

=== War of 1812 ===
- DEFENCE OF CANADA - 1812-1815 - DÉFENSE DU CANADA
- NIAGARA

=== First World War ===
- ARRAS 1918
- AMIENS
- HINDENBURG LINE
- PURSUIT TO MONS

=== Second World War ===
- Honorary distinction: the badge of the Stormont, Dundas and Glengarry Highlanders on the drums.

=== War in Afghanistan ===
- Afghanistan

== Recruiting ==
The unit recruits infantry soldiers and officers from Brockville and surrounding communities, traditionally west to Kingston and north to Kemptville and Ottawa. Basic training for the Primary Reserve is typically conducted every second weekend over a period of 6 months, during the fall and winter. Infantry soldiers must complete an 8-week qualification course at CFB Meaford. Infantry officers must complete basic training as well as two additional qualification courses at the Infantry School in CFB Gagetown, which require a further 10- and 12-week commitment.

== Training ==
The Brocks train regularly at Canadian Armed Forces ranges and training areas, such as CFB Petawawa and CFB Kingston, as well as within Brockville, Prescott, and other local communities. Members of the unit are expected to train a minimum of one night a week and participate in one weekend exercise a month. Training consists of basic infantry soldier skills, individual battle-task standards, and more advanced training, such as urban operations and live-fire field exercises. The unit often trains with its sister unit—The Stormont, Dundas and Glengarry Highlanders—as well as participating in brigade-level training exercises with 33 Canadian Brigade Group as part of the 33 Territorial Battalion Group formation, encompassing units from across 33 CBG.

== Armoury ==
Site	Date(s)	Designated	Description	Image
Brockville Armoury; 1-9 East Avenue facing King Street	1900-1	1990 Recognized - Register of the Government of Canada Heritage Buildings	Housing The Brockville Rifles, this centrally located, large, low-massed, stone structure in the Romanesque style features a low-pitched gable roof.	

== See also ==
- List of armouries in Canada
- Military history of Canada
- History of the Canadian Army
- Canadian Forces

== Order of precedence ==
Preceded by The Lorne Scots (Peel, Dufferin and Halton Regiment)	The Brockville Rifles	Succeeded by Stormont, Dundas and Glengarry Highlanders
