= 160th (Bruce) Battalion, CEF =

The 160th (Bruce) Battalion, CEF was a unit in the Canadian Expeditionary Force during the First World War.

Based in Walkerton, Ontario, the unit began recruiting in late 1915 in Bruce County. The battalion originally had four companies each with men from a different part of the county. A Company's members were from Walkerton, Cargill, Paisley, Port Elgin and Southampton; B Company from Chesley, Tara, Hepworth and Teeswater; C Company from Wiarton, Lion's Head, Tobermory, Cape Chin and the local First Nations; and D Company from Kincardine, Lucknow, Ripley and Tiverton. The battalion band was mostly formed from members of the Chesley Citizen's Band.

After sailing to England in October 1916, the battalion was absorbed into the 4th Reserve Battalion on February 15, 1918.

The 160th (Bruce) Battalion, CEF had three Officers Commanding: Lieut-Col. A. Weir (October 17, 1916—May 6, 1917), Lieut-Col. D. M. Sutherland (May 6, 1917—December 1, 1917), and Major A. M. Moffatt (December 1, 1917—February 23, 1918).

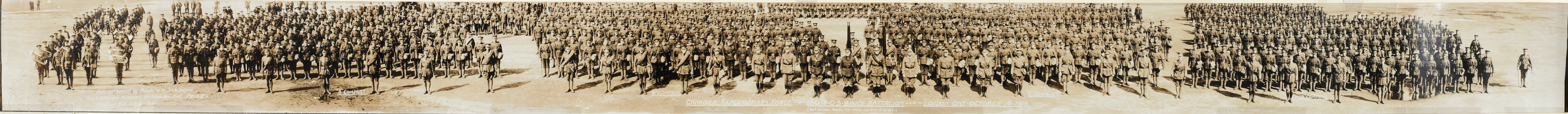
