= Canadian Light Horse =

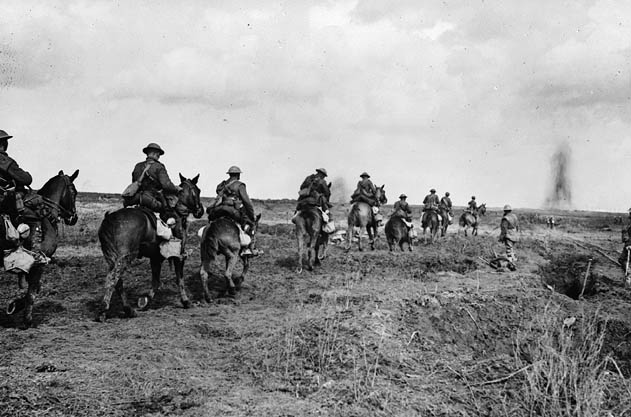
- The Canadian Light Horse going into action at Vimy Ridge
- Active: 1916–1920
- Disbanded: 15 November 1920
- Country: Canada
- Branch: Canadian Expeditionary Force
- Type: Cavalry
- Role: Cavalry
- Size: 3 Squadrons
- Part of: Canadian Corps

The Canadian Light Horse (CLH) was a cavalry regiment of the Canadian Expeditionary Force during the First World War.

== History ==
The CLH was formed as the Canadian Corps Cavalry Regiment in May 1916, by the amalgamation of three divisional cavalry squadrons: the 1st Divisional Cavalry Squadron (19th Alberta Dragoons), the 2nd Divisional Cavalry Squadron (1st Hussars), and the 3rd Divisional Cavalry Squadron (16th Light Horse). In March 1917 the regiment was renamed the Canadian Light Horse.

After amalgamation, the each squadron of the regiment continued to wear the cap badge of its founding militia unit:

- A Squadron: 19th Alberta Dragoons
- B Squadron: 1st Hussars
- C Squadron: 16th Light Horse

The CLH participated in the Battle of Vimy Ridge and the Hundred Days Offensive. The regiment's duties included mounted patrol work, dispatch riding, escort duties, and traffic control, as well as pursuit of the enemy during offensive operations.

On October 10, 1918, at 2:15 pm, A and C Squadrons charged the enemy with 280 horses at Iwuy, a village 9 km northeast of Cambrai. This was the last combat charge in the history of Canadian cavalry.

Commanding officers:

- Lieutenant-Colonel J.H. Elmsley (19 May 1916 - 26 June 1916)
- Lieutenant-Colonel C.T. Van Straubenzee (26 June 1916 - 13 March 1917)
- Lieutenant-Colonel E.I. Leonard (13 March 1917 - 14 February 1919)

== See also ==
- List of mounted regiments in the Canadian Expeditionary Force
