= Norman Lubbock Robinson =

Pioneering photographer in the Northwest Territories

Norman Robinson
- Norman Robinson in uniform during World War I
- Born: July 18, 1890; County Wicklow, Ireland
- Died: 1951 (aged 60–61); Calgary
- Other name: Norman Lubbock Robinson
- Occupations: police officer, soldier, photographer, game warden, civil servant
- Known for: took historic photos of Canada's north

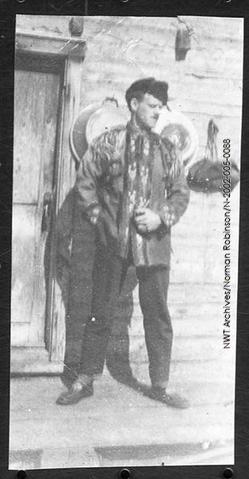
Robinson served as purser on the Mackenzie River

Norman Lubbock Robinson (1890–1951) was a photographer, born in Ireland, known for taking historic photographs of Canada's north. The Northwest Territories Archives contains 709 historic photographs he took.

== Biography ==
Robinson served in the North-West Mounted Police (precursor to the RCMP) when he first moved to Canada. During World War I he served with the 19th Alberta Dragoons, and then with the British Army, Royal Field Artillery. Robinson was promoted to 2nd Lieutenant, and, according to the London Gazette, he was mentioned in dispatches, twice.

After he returned to Canada, following the war he served as an Inspector with the Soldiers Settlement Board. In the early 1920s he travelled to the North-West Territories, spending five years working as a trapper, a guide, and later as purser on the steamship Mackenzie River. It was during this five-year period he took the bulk of his historic photos.

In 1925 he tried to rejoin the RCMP, but was turned down because he no longer measured up to the eyesight requirements. He then operated a lumber business, in Kamloops, until the early 1930s. He married in 1928. Following his work in the timber industry he then became a game warden, a position he held until 1938, when he and his wife spent two years in Ireland.

When he died in 1951 he was working for the Unemployment Insurance Commission as an employment claims officer.
