= 6th Canadian Infantry Division =

- Formation patch of the division.
- Active: 18 March 1942–31 January 1946
- Country: Canada
- Branch: Canadian Army
- Type: Infantry
- Size: Division
- Garrison/HQ: Vancouver Island
- Engagements: World War II; Aleutian Islands campaign

Commanders
- Notable commanders: A. E. Potts; H. N. Ganong; B. M. Hoffmeister

The 6th Canadian Infantry Division was an infantry division of the Canadian Army, formed on 18 March 1942 during the Second World War. It was attached to Pacific Command. The division had a brigade sent to the Aleutian Islands Campaign, particularly at Kiska, but never saw action. The 6th Division was to have been part of a proposed Commonwealth Corps, formed for a planned invasion of Japan, but was disbanded on 31 January 1946, after the surrender of Japan in August 1945.

== History ==
The 6th Canadian Infantry Division was raised as part of a home-defence scheme in Canada, the culmination of various mobilizations throughout 1941 and 1942. The 6th was raised in March 1942 with its headquarters on Vancouver Island in British Columbia. Various composite units were stationed at Port Alberni, Vancouver Island and Vernon. Throughout 1943, the division lost its artillery units to coastal defence work, and other battalions were shipped overseas. In June 1943, these units were sent to Kiska only to find the island abandoned, and in late 1943, the 7th Canadian Infantry Division was disbanded and various battalions were amalgamated into the 6th. By January 1944, the units had returned from Kiska, having not taken part in any fighting. On 1 December 1944, the need for coastal defence having lessened, it was decided that the division should be disbanded.

However, planning for a proposed Allied invasion of Japan called for a Canadian division to be a component of a combined Commonwealth Corps. Disbandment of the 6th halted and it was re-formed as the main component of the Canadian Army Pacific Force, with the inclusion of units that served with other divisions.

The re-formed division was commanded by Major General Bert Hoffmeister and its primary units were named after the components of the 1st Canadian Infantry Division. However, its battalions were to be organized along the lines of a US Army infantry division and would be equipped primarily with US-made weapons, vehicles and equipment.

Following the surrender of Japan, the division's disbandment continued. The remaining units were disbanded by 31 January 1946.

== Order of battle ==
=== March 1942 ===
- Headquarters, Sixth Division
  - 6th Division Intelligence Section
- No. 6 Field Security Section
- No. 6 Defence and Employment Platoon (Lorne Scots)
- Machine gun battalion – 1st Battalion, The Canadian Fusiliers (City of London Regiment)
- 13th Canadian Infantry Brigade
  - 2nd Battalion, The Canadian Scottish Regiment
  - 1st Battalion, The Brockville Rifles
  - 1st Battalion, The Edmonton Fusiliers
  - No. 13 Defence Platoon (Lorne Scots)
- 14th Canadian Infantry Brigade
  - 1st Battalion, The Kent Regiment
  - 1st Battalion, The King's Own Rifles of Canada
  - 1st Battalion, The Midland Regiment (Northumberland and Durham)
  - No. 14 Defence Platoon (Lorne Scots)
- 15th Canadian Infantry Brigade
  - 1st Battalion, Les Fusiliers de Sherbrooke
  - 1st Battalion, Le Régiment de Montmagny
  - 1st Battalion, Le Régiment de Québec
  - No. 15 Defence Platoon (Lorne Scots)
- Canadian Armoured Corps
  - 31st (Alberta) Reconnaissance Battalion
- Royal Canadian Artillery
  - Headquarters, Sixth Divisional Artillery, RCA
  - 19th Field Regiment
  - 20th Field Regiment
  - 21st Field Regiment
  - 9th Light Anti-Aircraft Regiment
    - 25th Light Anti-Aircraft Battery
    - 46th Light Anti-Aircraft Battery
    - 48th Light Anti-Aircraft Battery
    - 79th Light Anti-Aircraft Battery
  - 6th Anti-Tank Regiment
    - 33rd Anti-Tank Battery
    - 56th Anti-Tank Battery
    - 74th Anti-Tank Battery
    - 103rd Anti-Tank Battery
- Corps of Royal Canadian Engineers
  - Headquarters 6th Divisional Engineers, RCE
  - 7th Field Park Company, RCE
  - 20th Field Company, RCE
  - 25th Field Company, RCE
  - 26th Field Company, RCE
- Royal Canadian Corps of Signals
  - Headquarters 6th Divisional Signals RCCS
- Royal Canadian Army Service Corps
  - 6th Divisional Petrol Company, RCASC.

=== August 1943 at Kiska ===
- 9th Light Anti-Aircraft Regiment, RCA
- 19th Field Regiment, RCA
- 20th Field Regiment, RCA (shared with the 7th Canadian Infantry Division)
- 21st Field Regiment, RCA
- 24th Field Regiment, RCA (shared with the 7th Canadian Infantry Division)
- 25th Field Regiment, RCA
- 13th Canadian Infantry Brigade
  - 1st Battalion, The Canadian Fusiliers (City of London Regiment)
  - 1st Battalion, The Winnipeg Grenadiers
  - 1st Battalion, The Rocky Mountain Rangers
  - 1st Battalion, Le Régiment de Hull
  - 24th Field Regiment, RCA
  - 46th Light AA Battery, RCA
  - 24th Field Company, RCE
  - "C" Company, 1st Battalion, The Saint John Fusiliers (Machine Gun)

=== November 1943 ===
- No. 6 Defence and Employment Platoon (Lorne Scots)
- 31st (Alberta) Reconnaissance Regiment
  - 15th, 25th, 26th Field Companies, RCE
- 13th Canadian Infantry Brigade Group
  - 24th Field Regiment, RCA
  - 46th Light AA Battery, RCA
  - 1st Battalion, The Canadian Fusiliers (City of London Regiment)
  - 1st Battalion, The Winnipeg Grenadiers
  - 1st Battalion, The Rocky Mountain Rangers
  - 1st Battalion, Le Régiment de Hull
  - 1 Company, 1st Battalion, The Saint John Fusiliers (Machine Gun)
  - 24th Field Company, RCE
  - No. 13 Defence Platoon (Lorne Scots)
- 14th Canadian Infantry Brigade Group
  - 25th Field Regiment, RCA
  - 48th Light AA Battery, RCA
  - 1st Battalion, The Winnipeg Light Infantry
  - 1st Battalion, Les Fusiliers de Sherbrooke
  - 1st Battalion, The Oxford Rifles
  - 1st Battalion, The Prince of Wales Rangers (Peterborough Regiment)
  - 1 Company, 1st Battalion, The Saint John Fusiliers (Machine Gun)
  - No. 14 Ground Defence Platoon (Lorne Scots)
- 15th Canadian Infantry Brigade Group
  - 20th Field Regiment, RCA
  - 25th Light AA Battery, RCA
  - 1st Battalion, The Prince Albert Volunteers
  - 1st Battalion, Les Fusiliers du S^{t}-Laurent
  - 1st Battalion, The Prince Edward Island Highlanders
  - 1st Battalion, The Royal Rifles of Canada
  - No. 15 Ground Defence Platoon (Lorne Scots)
  - 1 Company, 1st Battalion, The Saint John Fusiliers (Machine Gun)

=== November 1944 ===
- No. 6 Defence and Employment Platoon (Lorne Scots)
- 31st (Alberta) Reconnaissance Regiment
  - 1st Battalion, The Saint John Fusiliers (Machine Gun)
  - 20th, 24th, 25th Field Regiments, RCA
  - 22nd Heavy AA Battery (Mobile), RCA
  - 25th, 46th, 48th Light AA Batteries, RCA
  - 15th, 24th, 25th, 26th Field Companies, RCE
- 14th Canadian Infantry Brigade Group
  - 1st Battalion, The Winnipeg Light Infantry
  - 1st Battalion, Les Fusiliers de Sherbrooke
  - 1st Battalion, The Oxford Rifles
  - No. 14 Defence Platoon (Lorne Scots)
- 15th Canadian Infantry Brigade Group
  - 1st Battalion, The Prince Albert Volunteers
  - 1st Battalion, Les Fusiliers du S^{t}-Laurent
  - 1st Battalion, The Prince Edward Island Highlanders
  - No. 15 Defence Platoon (Lorne Scots)
- 16th Canadian Infantry Brigade Group
  - 1st Battalion, The Midland Regiment (Northumberland and Durham)
  - 1st Battalion, The Royal Rifles of Canada
  - 1st Battalion, The Prince of Wales Rangers (Peterborough Regiment)
