= Edmonton Fusiliers =

Canadian military unit (1908–1946)

The Edmonton Fusiliers
- Active: 1908–1946
- Country: Canada
- Branch: Canadian Militia (1908–1940); Canadian Army (1940–1946)
- Type: Fusiliers
- Role: Infantry
- Size: Five companies
- Part of: Non-Permanent Active Militia (1908–1940); Royal Canadian Infantry Corps (1942–1946)
- Garrison/HQ: Edmonton, Alberta
- Engagements: First World War
- Battle honours: Ypres, 1915, ‘17; Festubert, 1915; Mount Sorrel; Somme, 1916; Arras, 1917, ‘18; Hill 70; Amiens; Hindenburg Line; Pursuit to Mons

The Edmonton Fusiliers was an infantry regiment of the Non-Permanent Active Militia of the Canadian Militia and later the Canadian Army. First raised in 1908 as part of the 101st Regiment Edmonton Fusiliers, it became a separate regiment in 1924 when The Edmonton Regiment was split into two separate regiments. In 1946, the regiment was Amalgamated with the 19th Alberta Dragoons.

== Lineage ==
=== The Edmonton Fusiliers ===
- Originated on 1 April 1908, in Edmonton, Alberta, as the 101st Regiment.
- Redesignated on 1 March 1909, as 101st Regiment Edmonton Fusiliers.
- Redesignated on 15 March 1920, as The Edmonton Regiment.
- Reorganized on 15 May 1924, when The Edmonton Regiment was separated into two separate regiments: The Edmonton Fusiliers and The Edmonton Regiment (now The Loyal Edmonton Regiment (4th Battalion, Princess Patricia's Canadian Light Infantry)).
- Amalgamated on 1 April 1936, with A Company of the 13th Machine Gun Battalion, CMGC (now The King's Own Calgary Regiment (RCAC)).
- Redesignated on 15 December 1936, as The Edmonton Fusiliers (MG).
- Redesignated on 7 November 1941, as 2nd (Reserve) Battalion, The Edmonton Fusiliers (MG).
- Redesignated on 1 April 1941, as 2nd (Reserve) Battalion, The Edmonton Fusiliers.
- Amalgamated on 1 April 1946, with the 19th Alberta Dragoons and designated as the 19th (Alberta) Armoured Car Regiment, RCAC.

== Perpetuations ==
- 9th Battalion, CEF
- 66th Battalion (Edmonton Guards), CEF
- 138th (Edmonton, Alberta) Battalion, CEF
- 202nd (Sportsman's) Battalion, CEF

== History ==
=== Early history ===
On 1 April 1908, the 101st Regiment was authorized for service with its Headquarters and companies in Edmonton, Alberta.

On 1 March 1909, the regiment was redesignated as the 101st Regiment (Edmonton Fusiliers).

=== First World War ===
On 10 August 1914, the 9th Battalion, CEF, was authorized for service and on 1 October 1914, the battalion embarked for Great Britain. After its arrival in the UK, on 29 April 1915, the battalion was redesignated as the 9th Reserve Infantry Battalion, CEF, to provide reinforcements for the Canadian Corps. On 15 September 1917, the 9th Battalion, CEF was disbanded.

On 20 April 1915, the 66th Battalion (Edmonton Guards), CEF, was authorized for service and on 28 April 1916, the battalion embarked for Great Britain. After its arrival in the UK, on 7 July 1916, the battalion's personnel were absorbed by the 9th Reserve Battalion, CEF to provide reinforcements for the Canadian Corps. On 30 August 1920, the 66th Battalion, CEF was disbanded.

On 22 December 1915, the 138th (Edmonton, Alberta) Battalion, CEF, was authorized for service and on 22 August 1916, the battalion embarked for Great Britain. After its arrival in the UK, on 8 December 1916, the battalion's personnel were absorbed by the 128th (Moose Jaw) Battalion, CEF, to provide reinforcements for the Canadian Corps. On 30 August 1920, the 138th Battalion, CEF was disbanded.

On 15 July 1916, the 202nd (Sportsman's) Battalion, CEF, was authorized for service and on 23 November 1916, the battalion embarked for Great Britain. After its arrival in the UK, on 27 May 1917, the battalion's personnel were absorbed by the 9th Reserve Battalion, CEF, to provide reinforcements for the Canadian Corps. On 18 February 1918, the 202nd Battalion, CEF was disbanded.

=== 1920s–1930s ===
On 15 March 1920, as a result of the Otter Commission and the following reorganization of the Canadian Militia, the regiment was redesignated as The Edmonton Regiment. The regiment was organized with five battalions, two of which were active and three were reserve in order to perpetuate the former CEF battalions.

On 15 May 1924, the regiment was split up and reorganized as two regiments: The Edmonton Fusiliers and The Edmonton Regiment (now The Loyal Edmonton Regiment).

=== Second World War ===
From 26 August to 1 September 1939, Details from The Edmonton Fusiliers were called out on active service under the designation The Edmonton Fusiliers (MG), CASF for local protection duties. On 31 December 1940, the details on active service were disbanded.

On 24 May 1940, the regiment mobilized The Edmonton Fusiliers, CASF for active service and on 7 November 1940, the battalion was redesignated as the 1st Battalion, The Edmonton Fusiliers, CASF. The battalion served in Canada in a home defence role as part of the 13th Canadian Infantry Brigade, 6th Canadian Infantry Division. On 14 November 1945, the 1st Battalion was disbanded.

On 12 May 1942, the regiment mobilized the 3rd Battalion, The Edmonton Fusiliers, CASF for active service. The battalion served in Canada in a home defence role as part of the 16th Canadian Infantry Brigade, 8th Canadian Infantry Division. On 15 August 1943, the 3rd Battalion was disbanded.

== Organization ==
=== The Edmonton Fusiliers (M.G.) (15 December 1936) ===
- Regimental Headquarters (Edmonton)
- A Company (Edmonton)
- B Company (Edmonton)
- C Company (Edmonton)
- D Company (Wetaskiwin)

== Battle honours ==
- Ypres, 1915, '17 (Note: Selected to be borne on colours and appointments)
- Festubert, 1915
- Mount Sorrel
- Somme, 1916
- Arras, 1917, '18
- Hill 70
- Amiens
- Hindenburg Line
- Pursuit to Mons
