= Signal Hill, Calgary =

Signal Hill
- Neighbourhood
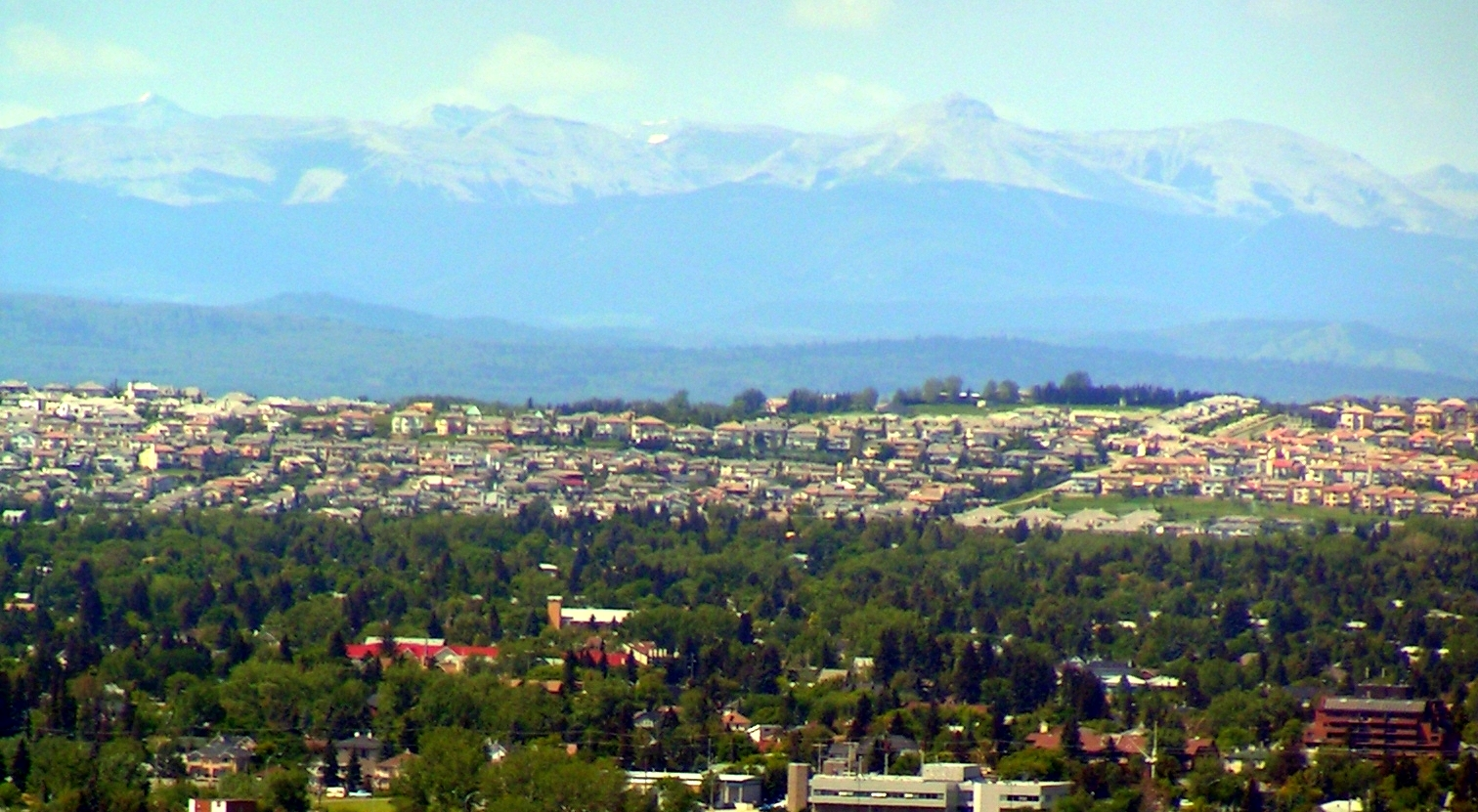
- Signal Hill and Canadian Rockies

- Location in Calgary
- Coordinates: 51°01′50″N 114°10′29″W
- Country: Canada
- Province: Alberta
- City: Calgary
- Quadrant: SW
- Ward: 6
- Established: 1987
- Annexed: 1956

Government
  - Mayor: Jeromy Farkas
  - Administrative body: Calgary City Council
  - Councillor: John Pantazopoulos (Independent)
- Elevation: 1,190 m (3,900 ft)

Population (2012)
  - Total: 13,914
  - Average Income (2005): $100,844
- Time zone: UTC-7 (MST)
- Postal code: T3H
- Area code: +1-403
- Website: Signal Hill Community Association

Signal Hill is a community in Calgary, Alberta. It contains the residential neighbourhoods of Sienna Hills and Signal Ridge. It is bounded by Sarcee Trail to the east, 17th Ave to the north, Stoney Trail to the south and 69th Street to the west.

Battalion Park is established on the southern slopes of Cairn Hill, overlooking the south of the community. The shopping centres at Westhills Towne Centre, Signal Hill Centre, West Market Square and Signature Park Plaza serve the community. Located in the Signal Hill Centre area is a public library called Signal Hill Library, which serves the surrounding communities.

The land was annexed to the City of Calgary in 1956, and Signal Hill was established in 1986. It is represented in the Calgary City Council by the Ward 6 councillor John Pantazopoulos, on a provincial level by Calgary West MLA Mike Ellis, and at federal level by Calgary Signal Hill MP David McKenzie.

== Demographics ==
In the City of Calgary's 2021 municipal census, Signal Hill had a population of 14,065 living in 5,250 dwellings. With a land area of 5.6 km^{2} (2.2 sq mi), it had a population density of 2,512/km^{2} (6,510/sq mi) in 2012.

Signal Hill is a wealthy neighbourhood, with the median household income of $ $169,369 (2021). The wealthier residents ($200,000-$400,000 median household income) live in Upper Signal hill, which is located on the top of Cairn Hill, above the first few rows of houses which are located above the famous Signal Hill numbers. The entrance to this area can be found along Signal Hill Drive. As of 2021, 37% of the residents were immigrants.

== Amenities ==
=== Battalion Park ===
Battalion Park, located on the hillside of Signal Hill, overlooks the Sarcee Nation. The area was a military reserve prior to World War I for the Canadian Forces. The hill features 16,000 stones hauled by soldiers and arranged to form four numbers (137, 113, 151 and 51). The numbers correspond to the four battalions of the Canadian Expeditionary Force who trained in that area before leaving to fight in World War 1. Battalion Park officially opened on November 3, 1991.

=== Signal Hill Shopping Centre ===
The Signal Hill area is also home to the Signal Hill Shopping Centre, located West of Sarcee Trail and north of Richmond Road. This shopping area is also located adjacent to the WestHills Towne Centre, located in Stewart Green, in Southwest Calgary. The Signal Hill Shopping Centre houses over 50 unique stores and services, including grocery stores, restaurants, fast food restaurants, and various retail stores. The presence of many stores, as well as the proximity to the more than 40 stores and services located in WestHills Towne Centre make this a popular shopping destination for residents of Southwest Calgary.

== Education ==
Signal Hill is home to the Battalion Park School. Operated by the Calgary Board of Education, the school serves students in kindergarten through grade six. In the 2026-27 school year, it had an enrollment of 467 students drawn from Signal Hill and the nearby Richmond Hill, Discovery Ridge and Springbank Hill communities.

== See also ==
- List of neighbourhoods in Calgary
