= 9th Battalion, CEF =

- Active: 1914–1917
- Disbanded: 1917
- Country: Canada
- Branch: Canadian Expeditionary Force
- Type: Infantry
- Battle honours: The Great War, 1914–17

The 9th Battalion, CEF, an infantry battalion of the Canadian Expeditionary Force, was authorized on 10 August 1914. It embarked for Britain on 1 October 1914, where it was redesignated as the 9th Reserve Infantry Battalion, CEF, on 29 April 1915, to provide reinforcements for the Canadian Corps in the field. The battalion was formally disbanded on 15 September 1917.

The battalion recruited in Edmonton, Alberta, and Ottawa, Ontario, and was mobilized at Camp Valcartier, Quebec. A large number of the initial recruits came from the 101st Regiment (Edmonton Fusiliers).

The 9th Reserve Battalion formed part of the Canadian Training Depot at Tidworth Camp on the Salisbury Plain.

The 9th Battalion, CEF, had three officers commanding:

- Lt.-Col. S.M. Rogers, 22 September 1914 – 4 May 1915
- Lt.-Col. E.E.W Moore, 8 May 1915 – 25 April 1916
- Lt.-Col. E.B. Clegg, 25 April 1916 – 2 January 1917

== Perpetuations ==
The perpetuation of the battalion was assigned in 1920 to the 2nd Battalion (Edmonton Fusiliers) (9th Battalion, CEF), the Edmonton Regiment. When the Edmonton Regiment was split into two regiments in 1924, the perpetuation passed to the 1st Battalion (9th Battalion, CEF), the Edmonton Fusiliers. The Edmonton Fusiliers are now incorporated by amalgamation in the South Alberta Light Horse, which continues to perpetuate the 9th Battalion, CEF.

== Battle honour ==
In 1929, the 9th Battalion was awarded the honour "The Great War, 1914–17".

== See also ==
- List of infantry battalions in the Canadian Expeditionary Force
