= Yú (surname 余) =

Chinese family name

Yú (余)
- Pronunciation: Yú (Mandarin); Yee, Woo, Oe (Hokkien); Yu, Yue, Yee, Eu (Cantonese); Dư (Vietnamese); Yi, Yee (Gan Chinese, Xiang Chinese, Sze yap); Er (Teochew)
- Language: Chinese

Origin
- Language: Middle Chinese
- Origin: the area of Fengxiang (鳳翔) to Xianyang (咸陽) in Shaanxi.
- Meaning: "surplus"

Other names
- Cognate: You (由)

Yú (Chinese: 余; pinyin: Yú) is a Chinese family name. It is also sometimes translated to Yee, the Taishanese spelling, in English. The name is transliterated as Dư in Vietnamese but is very rare in Vietnam. In Indonesia, it is transliterated as Oe (from Hokkien Pe̍h-ōe-jī: Û) It is the 90th name on the Hundred Family Surnames poem.

== History ==
Yu (余) is a typical name in the southern area of China. It means "surplus" in Chinese. Its place of origin of this name is thought to be in the area of Fengxiang (鳳翔) to Xianyang (咸陽) in Shaanxi. The Yu moved and settled in the She County (歙縣) in Anhui. During this period, the Yu became a prominent clan in the prefecture of Xin An (新安郡), Luoyang. Because of the war in the north at that time, they moved to the south, to places like Hunan and Hubei. After the Han dynasty, the surname became quite well-spread in the southern China, less so in northern China. Many of the Yu moved into counties like Zhejiang, Jiangsu and Jiangxi in southern China during the Southern and Northern Dynasties. After the Tang dynasty the surname became widespread and very well known in the southeast area of China. At this point they moved into other places like Fujian and Guangdong.

During the Spring and Autumn period of China, there was a court physician of the Qin state known as You Yu (由余). His descendants used the surnames You (由) or Yu (余).

Some non-Han Chinese people adopted the Yu surname, such as the Xiongnu, Chi Di, Mongols, Manchus, Qiang and Miaos.

== Notable people ==
- Annie Ee Yu Lian, Singaporean abuse and murder victim
- Amos Yee, Singapore YouTuber, blogger and activist.
- Audrey Eu, Hong Kong politician.
- Candice Yu, Hong Kong actress.
- Dennis Yu, film director.
- Ee Peng Liang, Singaporean philanthropist
- Er Teck Hwa, Malaysian politician
- Gerard Ee, Singaporean philanthropist
- James Yee, Former US Army Chaplain.
- Eu Tong Sen, businessman.
- Jiyuan Yu, a moral philosopher.
- Leland Yee, former Californian senator.
- Patrick Yu, Hong Kong lawyer.
- Shawn Yue, Hong Kong actor and singer.
- Yu Cheng-hsien, Minister of the Interior of the Republic of China (2002–2004)
- Yu Ching-tang, Vice Premier of the Republic of China (1963–1966)
- Yu Hua, contemporary novelist and writer
- Yu Kuai, a Chinese racing driver.
- Yu Jingxi, a Chinese League of Legends profession player for the team World Elite (Team WE).
- Yu Jingtian, Chinese singer，Youth With You (season 3)
- Yu Nan, famed actress.
- Yu Qiuli, a high-ranking member of China's Communist Party.
- Yu Xuntan, pen name Liu Shahe, author
- Yu Ying-shih, a Chinese-born American historian and sinologist
- Yu Zhengui, Muslim historian and scholar
- Kelvin Han Yee, American actor
- Eu Tong Sen, businessman
- Richard Eu, Eu Tong Sen grandson, Businessman and Musician
