= Kowloon East Barracks =

Military base in Kowloon Tong, Hong Kong

- 九龍東軍營
- Hong Kong
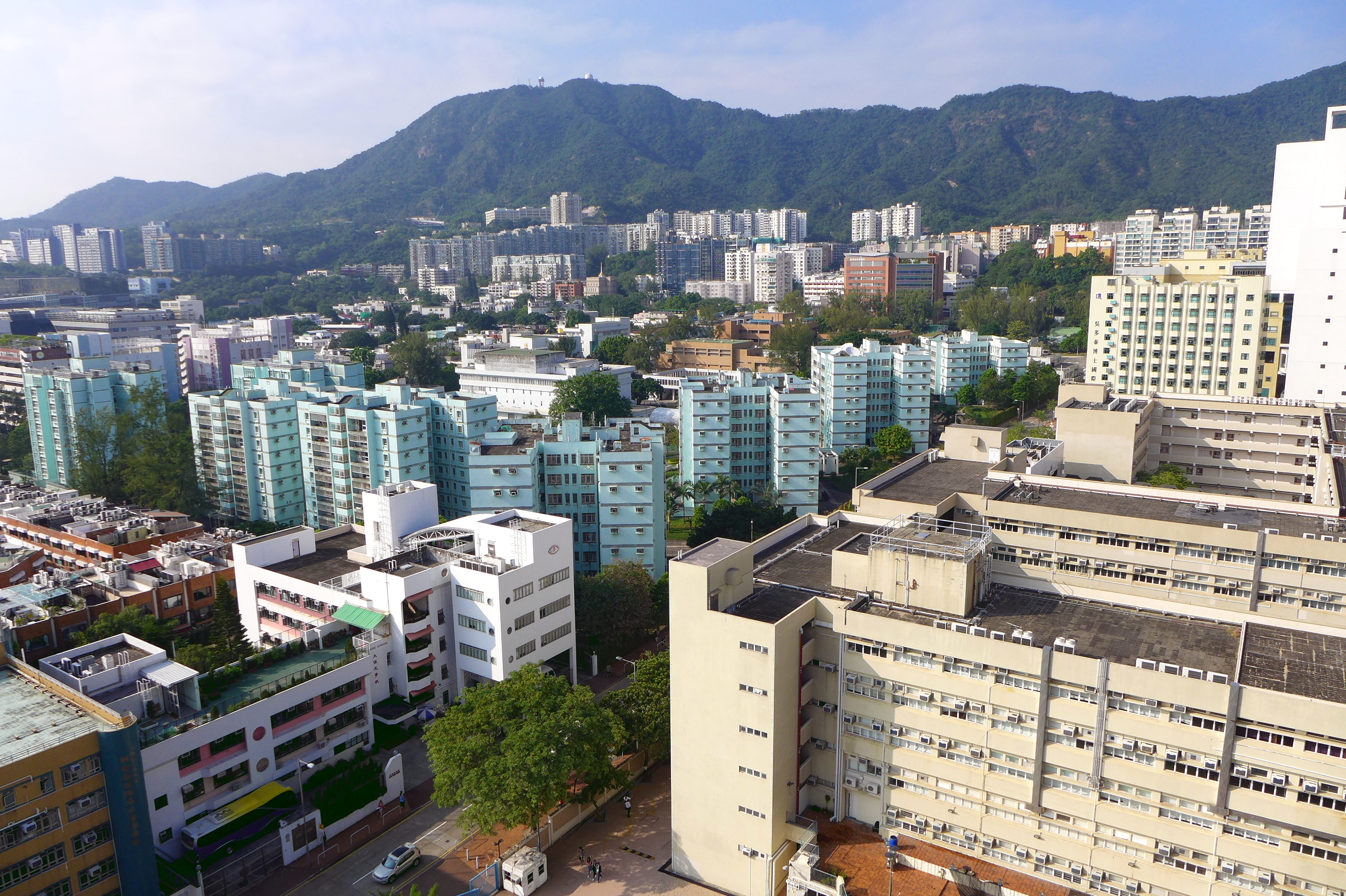
- Kowloon East Barracks

Site information
- Type: Barracks

Location
- Location within Hong Kong
- Coordinates: 22.337°N 114.180°E

Site history
- Built: 1945; 81 years ago
- Built for: War Office
- In use: 1945-Present

Garrison information
- Occupants: People's Liberation Army

Kowloon East Barracks
- Traditional Chinese: 九龍東軍營
- Simplified Chinese: 九龙东军营
- Literal meaning: Kowloon East Barracks
Transcriptions
Standard Mandarin
- Hanyu Pinyin: Jiǔlóng Dōng Jūnyíng
Yue: Cantonese
- Jyutping: gau2 lung4 dung1 gwan1 jing4

Osborn Barracks
- Traditional Chinese: 奧士本軍營
- Simplified Chinese: 奥士本军营
Transcriptions
Standard Mandarin
- Hanyu Pinyin: Àoshìběn Jūnyíng
Yue: Cantonese
- Jyutping: ou3 si6 bun2 gwan1 jing4

Kowloon East Barracks (Chinese: 九龍東軍營; Jyutping: gau2 lung4 dung1 gwan1 jing4), formerly Osborn Barracks (奧士本軍營; ou3 si6 bun2 gwan1 jing4), is a former British Army facility now in use by the People's Liberation Army in Kowloon City District, Hong Kong located in the northern part of Kowloon on Waterloo Road and Junction Road (across the street from Hong Kong Baptist University).

== History ==
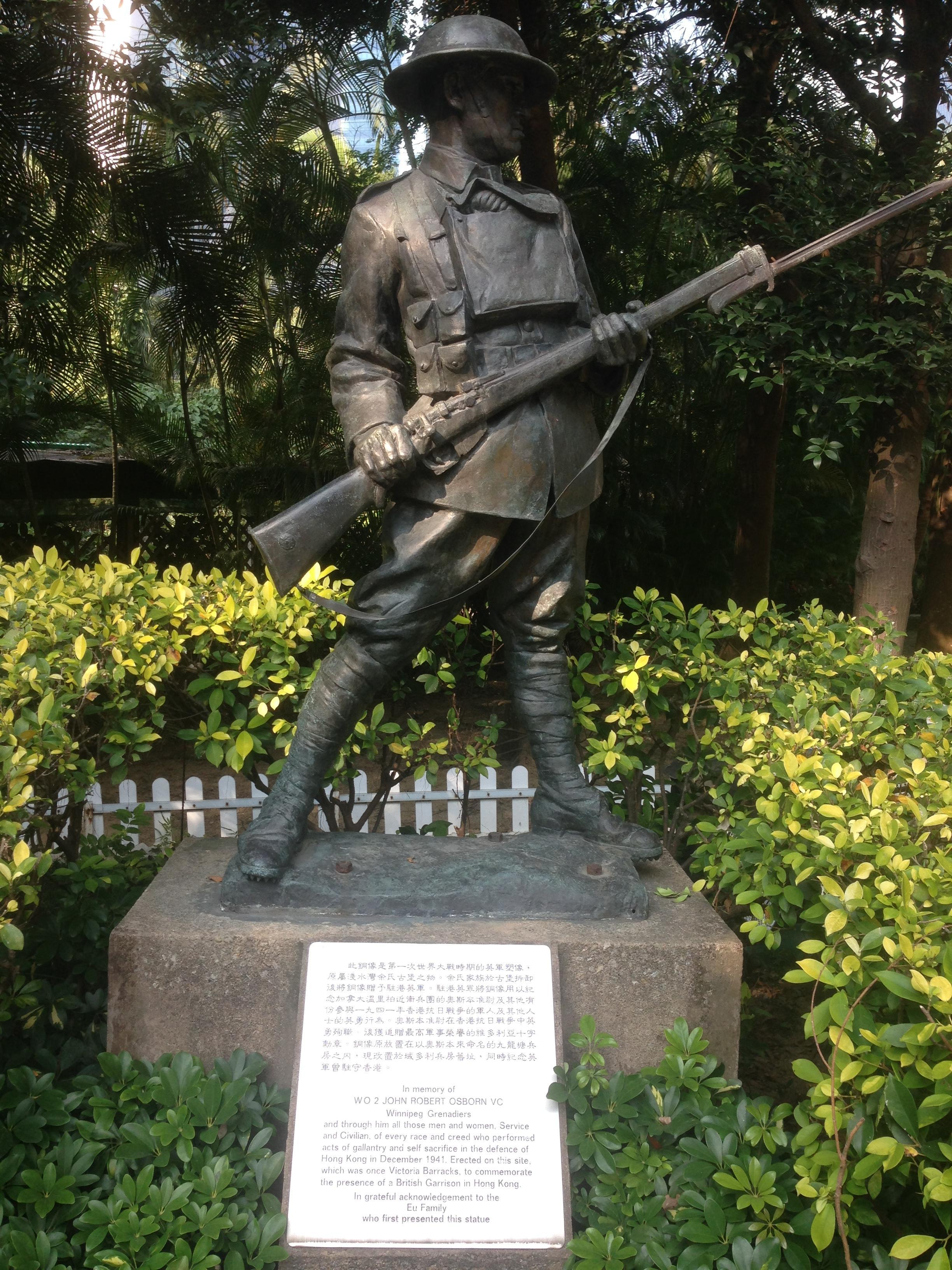
Statue of an anonymous World War I soldier from statuary collection of Eu Tong Sen. Also visible is the Battle of Hong Kong memorial plaque dedicated to all the defenders of Hong Kong in December 1941 through John Robert Osborn

The military facility was named for Canadian Army Company Sergeant Major John Robert Osborn of the Winnipeg Grenadiers. Osborn was a British-born Canadian who died defending Hong Kong in 1941. He was awarded the Victoria Cross and a barracks in Hong Kong was named in his honour in 1945 after the liberation. Osborn is memorialised at Sai Wan War Cemetery and also through a statue of an anonymous World War I soldier in Hong Kong Park on Hong Kong Island. The statue of the anonymous World War I soldier was originally part of the Eu Tong Sen statuary collection at Eucliff villa. When Eucliff villa was demolished, the Eu family donated the statue in the 1980s to Osborn Barracks in Kowloon where it stayed for 20 years before being relocated to Hong Kong Park.

Part of the land of the Osborn Barracks (the east of Renfrew Road) was given to Hong Kong Baptist University for new campus development in early 1990s. The last British Army regiment to occupy the Barracks was the Hong Kong Logistic Support Regiment RLC. After the transfer of sovereignty over Hong Kong the Osborn Barracks are used by the Chinese People's Liberation Army in Hong Kong.

A helipad is located along Renfrew Road.

In 2015, Albert Chan Wai-yip suggested that the barracks be decommissioned for more residential space.

== See also ==
- List of army barracks in Hong Kong
