= John Robert Osborn =

Recipient of the Victoria Cross

John Robert Osborn VC
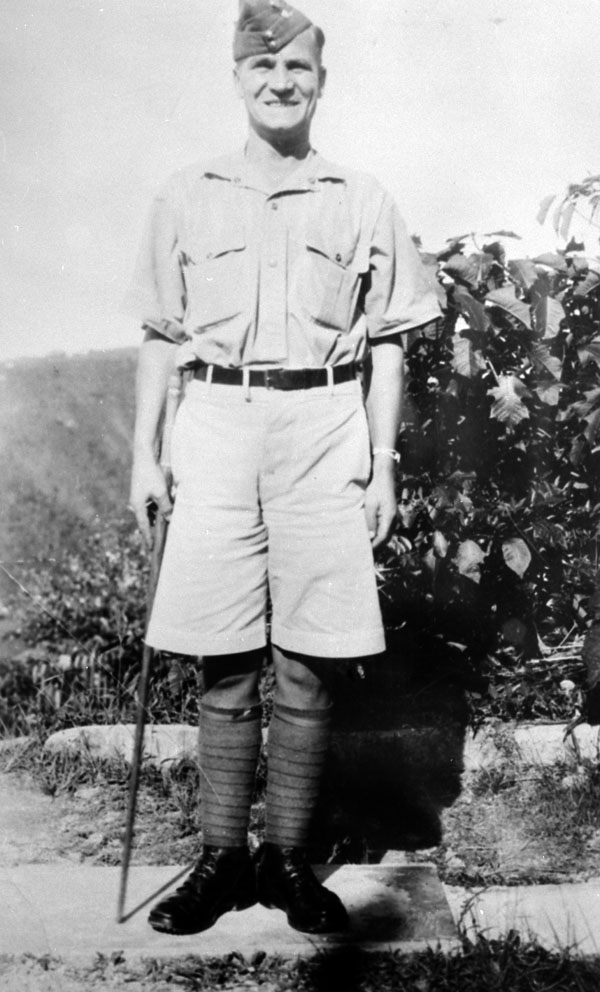
- Company Sergeant-Major J.R. Osborn of "A" Company, The Winnipeg Grenadiers, Jamaica, ca. 1940–1941.
- Born: 2 January 1899; Foulden, Norfolk, England
- Died: 19 December 1941 (aged 42); Mount Butler, British Hong Kong
- Military career
- Allegiance: United Kingdom; Canada
- Branch: British Navy; Canadian Army
- Service years: 1914−1918; 1933−1941 †
- Rank: Company Sergeant Major
- Unit: The Winnipeg Grenadiers
- Conflicts: First World War; Second World War: Pacific War; Battle of Hong Kong †
- Awards: Victoria Cross

Company Sergeant Major John Robert Osborn, VC (2 January 1899 − 19 December 1941) was a Canadian soldier. Osborn was a recipient of the Victoria Cross (VC), the highest and most prestigious award for gallantry in the face of the enemy that can be awarded to British and Commonwealth forces. He was born in Norfolk, England, and served in the Royal Navy during the First World War.

== Details ==
Osborn was born in England and came to Canada in 1920, after serving in the First World War with the Royal Naval Division. Many myths surround Osborn's World War I service though records point to Osborn having a short military service with him getting wounded by gas near Flesquières in March 1918. Osborn continued to suffer from the effects of the gas for the rest of his life causing Osborn, under a doctor's advice, to move to Canada to help alleviate the effects. Osborn first lived in Toronto, then Manitoba, working at various railway yards before finding farm work in Saskatchewan. On 19 May 1926, Osborn married Margaret Elizabeth Nelson; they had five children. Osborn was injured in an accident resulting in him having to quit farming and find other work. He went from job to job, never staying long, before finally settling in Winnipeg, Manitoba, in 1933, where he enlisted in the militia.

The start of the Second World War saw Osborn in The Winnipeg Grenadiers (Machine Gun), that by 15 March 1941, would be redesignated the 1st Battalion, The Winnipeg Grenadiers. Osborn served with The Winnipeg Grenadiers throughout the battalion's war service from their garrison duties in Jamaica to their deployment to Hong Kong. On the day before the Winnipeg Grenadiers were to board the train to Vancouver, Osborn's youngest child Patricia suffered burns when her dress caught fire from a stove. Osborn stayed the night at the hospital delivering blood transfusion before boarding the train the following day. By the time of the Japanese attack on Hong Kong, on 8 December 1941, Osborn had not received word that Patricia survived her injuries. Osborn was 42 years old, and a Warrant Officer Second Class, holding an appointment as Company Sergeant-Major for A Company in the 1st Battalion, The Winnipeg Grenadiers, during the Second World War when the following deed took place on Mount Butler, Hong Kong, for which he was awarded the VC. His citation in the London Gazette reads:

At Hong Kong on the morning of 19th December 1941 a Company of the Winnipeg Grenadiers to which Company Sergeant-Major Osborn belonged became divided during an attack on Mount Butler, a hill rising steeply above sea level. A part of the Company led by Company Sergeant-Major Osborn captured the hill at the point of the bayonet and held it for three hours when, owing to the superior numbers of the enemy and to fire from an unprotected flank, the position became untenable. Company Sergeant-Major Osborn and a small group covered the withdrawal and when their turn came to fall back, Osborn single-handed engaged the enemy while the remainder successfully rejoined the Company. Company Sergeant-Major Osborn had to run the gauntlet of heavy rifle and machine gun fire. With no consideration for his own safety he assisted and directed stragglers to the new Company position exposing himself to heavy enemy fire to cover their retirement. Whenever danger threatened he was there to encourage his men.

During the afternoon the Company was cut off from the Battalion and completely surrounded by the enemy who were able to approach to within grenade throwing distance of the slight depression which the Company was holding. Several enemy grenades were thrown which Company Sergeant-Major Osborn picked up and threw back. The enemy threw a grenade which landed in a position where it was impossible to pick it up and return it in time. Shouting a warning to his comrades this gallant Warrant Officer threw himself on the grenade which exploded killing him instantly. His self-sacrifice undoubtedly saved the lives of many others.

Company Sergeant-Major Osborn was an inspiring example to all throughout the defence which he assisted so magnificently in maintaining against an overwhelming enemy force for over eight and a half hours and in his death he displayed the highest quality of heroism and self-sacrifice.

Osborn was the first Canadian awarded a Victoria Cross in the Second World War. His was the only Victoria Cross awarded for Battle of Hong Kong.

== Legacy ==
Tributes in Hong Kong

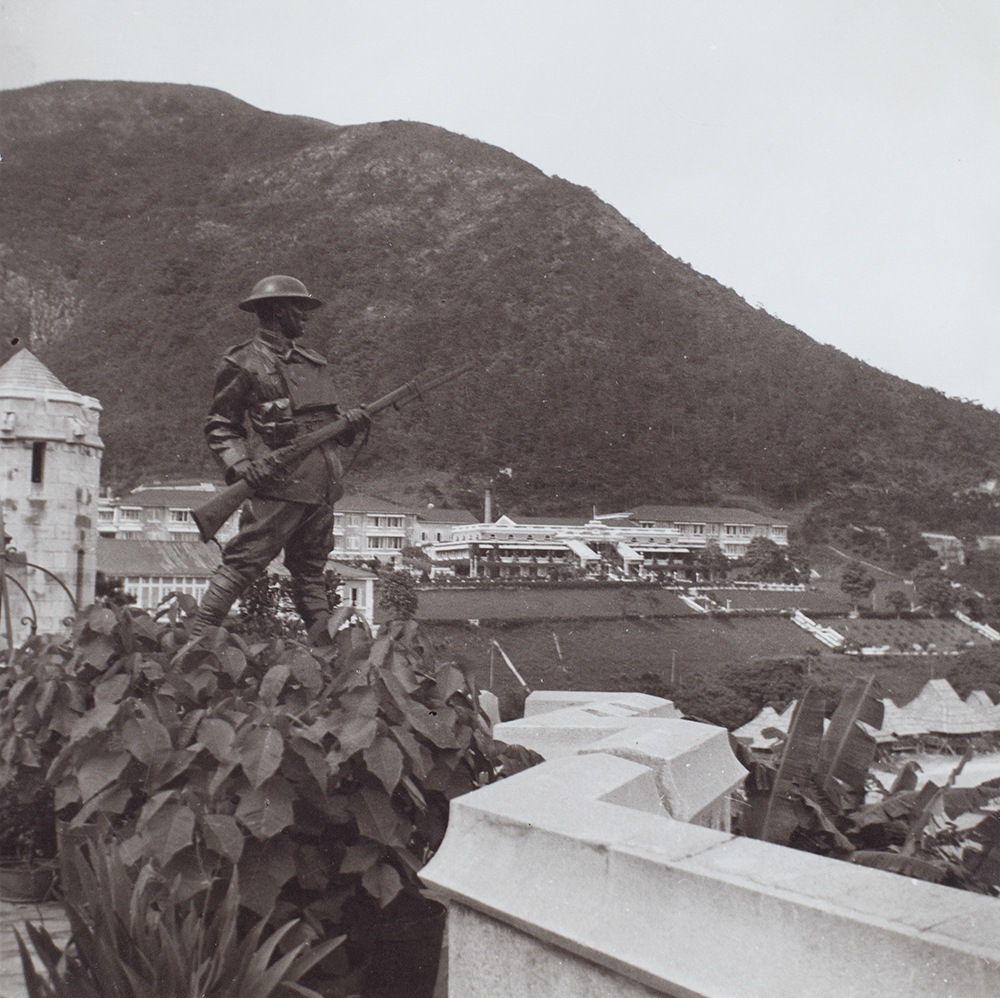
Statue of a soldier at Eucliffe, Hong Kong in the 1930s

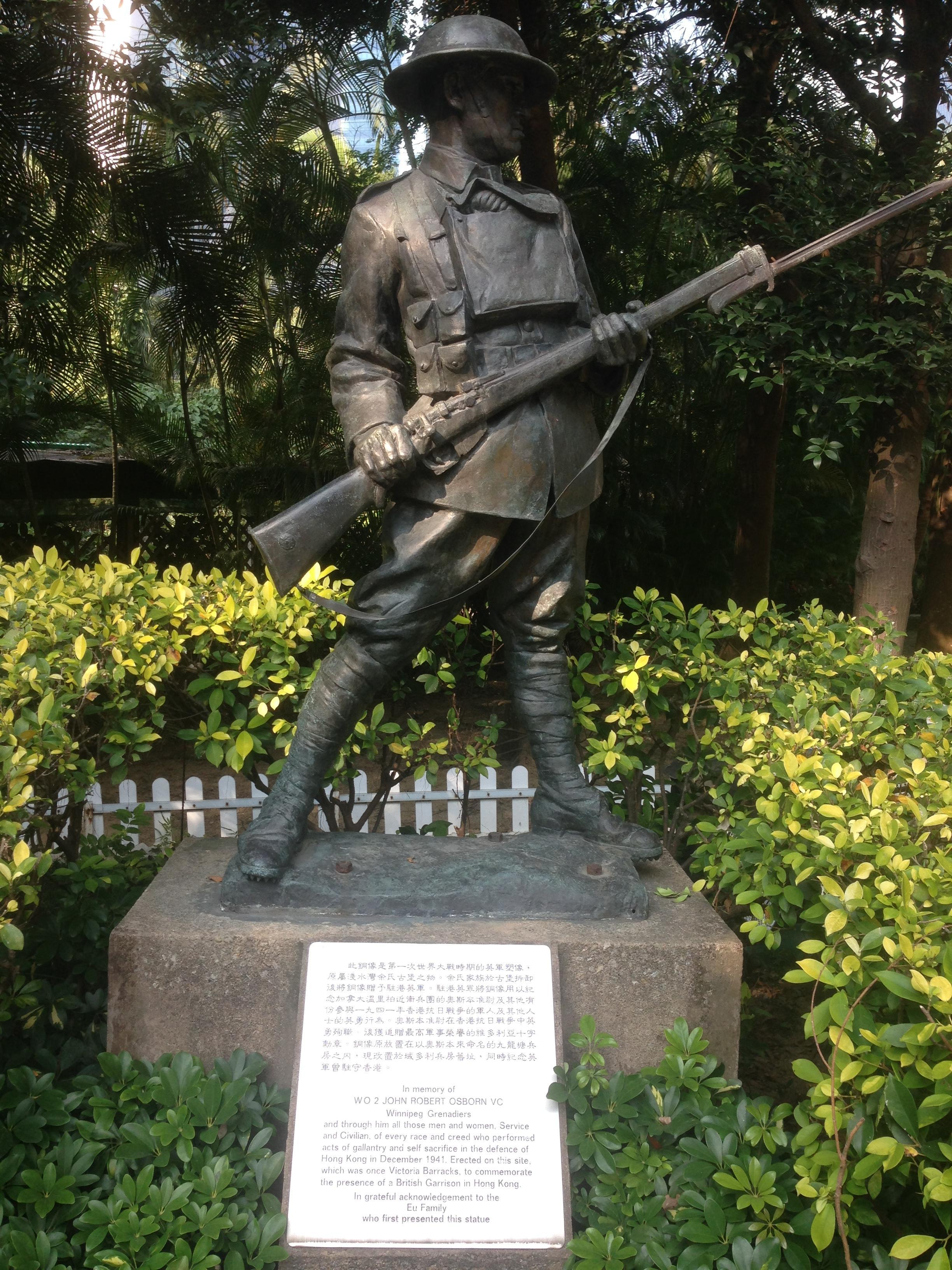
Statue of an anonymous World War I soldier from statuary collection of Eu Tong Sen. Also visible is the Battle of Hong Kong memorial plaque

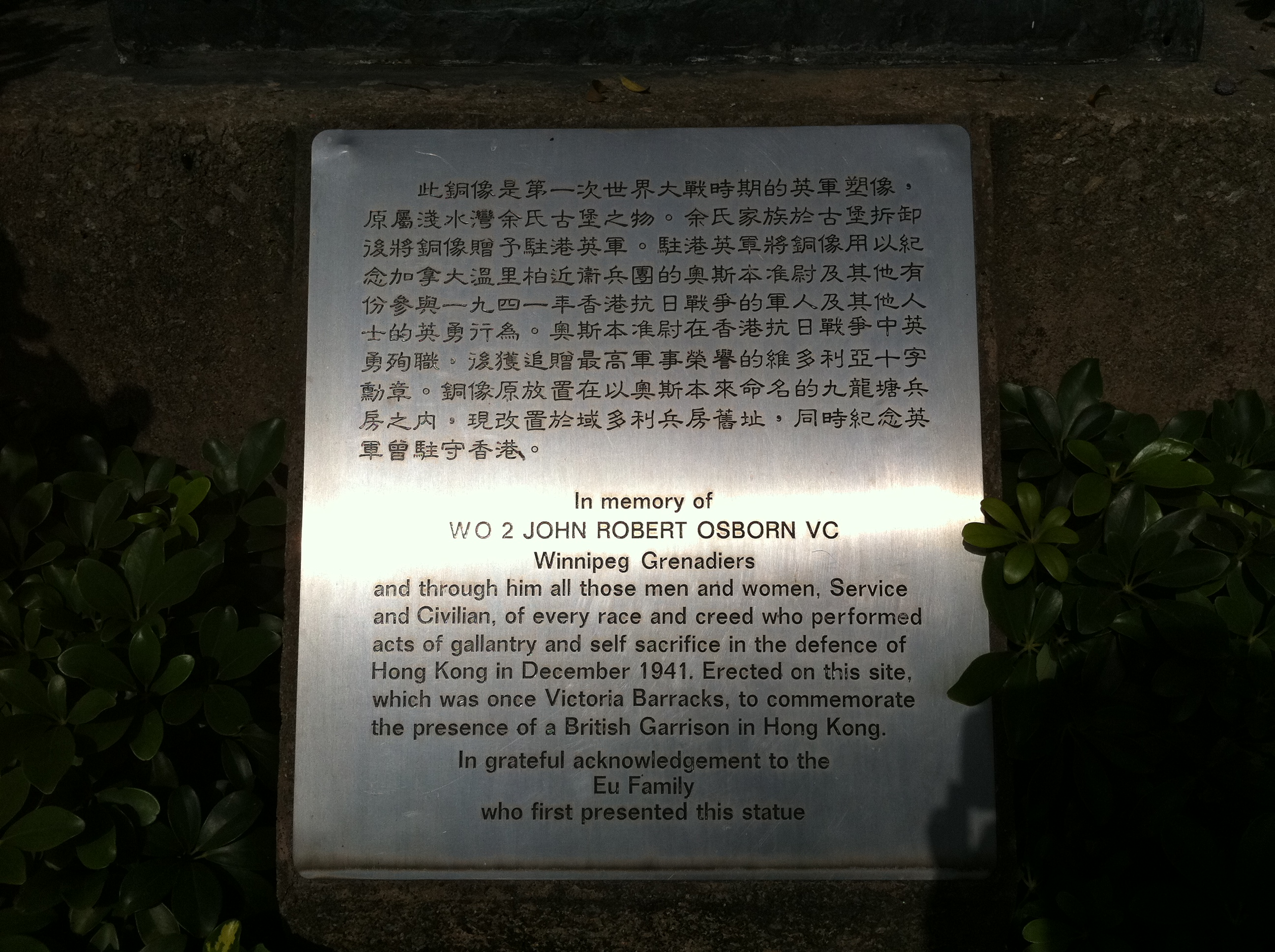
Memorial plaque dedicated to all the defenders of Hong Kong in December 1941 through John Robert Osborn and to commemorate the British Garrison at Hong Kong.

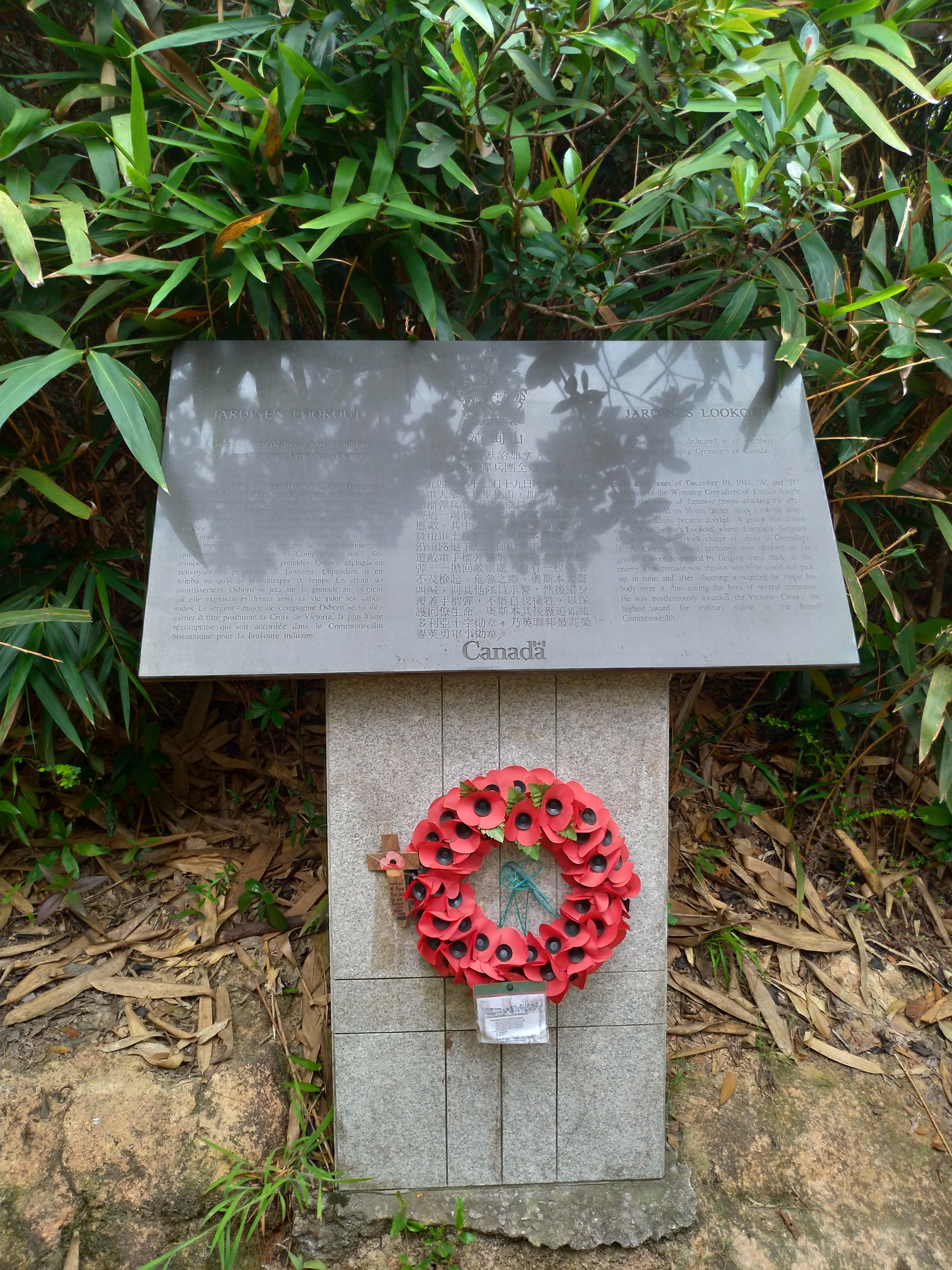
The plaque is dedicated to Osborn and all members of the Winnipeg Grenadiers.

- Osborn Barracks in Kowloon Tong was named after him (since 1997 the site is known as Kowloon East Barracks).
- Osborn is memorialised by a statue of an anonymous World War I soldier located in Hong Kong Park. The statue was originally part of the Eu Tong Sen statuary collection at Eucliff villa. When Eucliff villa was demolished, the statue was donated to Osborn Barracks in Kowloon in the 1980s and where it stayed for ten years before being relocated to Hong Kong Park.
- In 2005, a plaque remembering Osborn's sacrifice was unveiled on the Hong Kong Trail parallel to where he fell. The supposed spot where he died is marked by a pile of rocks nearby the sign, but is relatively inaccessible due to heavy foliage.
- His name is engraved on the memorial hall of Sai Wan War Cemetery in Hong Kong.

Tributes in Canada:

- In 2005, Historica Canada created a Heritage Minute honouring his heroic sacrifice.
- Osborn Avenue, a residential street in Brantford, Ontario, is named after him.
- His medals are displayed in the Canadian War Museum.
- There is an ANAVets unit in Winnipeg, Manitoba, named after him: ANAF John Osborn VC unit #1.
- The St. Vital Victorias junior ice hockey team in Winnipeg is named in memory of Osborn and his Victoria Cross.

Tributes in UK:

John R. Osborn VC is also commemorated on the war memorial at Holy Trinity Church, Balsham, Cambridgeshire.

== See also ==
- Falling on a grenade
- John K. Lawson
