= Chulek =

Village in Kampar, Perak, Malaysia

Coordinates: 4°25′56.0″N 101°10′32.0″E

Kampung Chulek or Chulek is a traditional village located to the eastern side of Gopeng, Perak, Malaysia. It is situated near to the hillside. It is one of many villages located on the east side. Many of the houses have maintained their originality without any interference from modern architecture. The inhabitants are all from Rao, an ethnicity originating from west Sumatra.
