= Richard Eu =

Singaporean businessperson and musician (born 1947)

Richard Eu Yee Ming
- Born: 1947 (age 78–79)
- Occupations: Businessperson and Musician

Richard Eu Yee Ming (simplified Chinese: 余义明; traditional Chinese: 余義明; pinyin: Yú Yìmíng; born 1947) is a Singaporean businessperson and musician. He is the chairman of healthcare firm Eu Yan Sang.

== Early life ==
Richard Eu Yee Ming was born in 1947, to a wealthy ethnic Chinese household of Cantonese ancestry. He spent his childhood at the now-demolished Eu Villa, which was once then "one of Singapore's largest homes," that was built by his grandfather, Eu Tong Sen. His parents were named Richard Eu Keng Mun (1923-2022) and Diana Eu (1921-2009).

The firstborn of four children, Eu went to Anglo-Chinese School, Singapore for his primary school education. He then later moved to England, where he attended Kent College, Canterbury as well as the University of London, where he obtained a degree in law (LLB). After graduation, he returned to Singapore in 1971.

== Career ==
Following his return to Singapore, Eu worked for Slater Walker, a British merchant bank which had acquired control of Haw Par Brothers International (now known as Haw Par Corporation Ltd), a publicly listed company which owned Tiger Balm and other assets. In 1976, he ventured with his uncle, Andrew Eu in Hong Kong by joining a stockbroking business firm and later becoming one of the shareholders of Hong Kong Television Broadcasts Ltd.

After his uncle died, Eu returned to Singapore and joined a stockbroking firm known as J Ballas & Co in 1978. He later joined another uncle in taking over a group of companies that was involved in computer sales.

In 1990, Eu joined Eu Yan Sang, a Chinese traditional medicine firm established by his great-grandfather, Eu Kong, as a general manager.

He led a series of buyouts from 1993 to 2000 and became CEO soon after listing Eu Yan Sang International in 2000.

In 2011, he was awarded the title of Ernst & Young Entrepreneur of the Year (Singapore).

== Personal life ==
Eu is married to Mary (née Chow; born 1955), with whom he has four children – three sons and one daughter.

Eu is an amateur musician and released an album titled 66 in 2013.
