= Gopeng Baru Jamek Mosque =

Mosque in Gopeng, Perak, Malaysia

- Masjid Jamek Baru Gopeng
- Location within Perak

Location
- Location: Gopeng, Perak, Malaysia
- Coordinates: 4°28′08.0″N 101°09′48.2″E

Architecture
- Type: mosque

Gopeng Baru Jamek Mosque (Malay: Masjid Jamek Baru Gopeng) is a community mosque located off Jalan Gopeng (Gopeng Road) in the town of Gopeng, Kampar District, Perak, Malaysia.

== Description ==
It was built to provide a larger space for the local Muslims to pray, particularly for Friday prayers due to the insufficient space in the previous Masjid Jamek Gopeng. Furthermore, the convenient location of the mosque and its more proper space planning make it the right decision for many to hold religious activities at this mosque instead of the old mosque.

Initially, there was no minaret built for the mosque. However, a minaret was built to complete the mosque after a very long halt. A cendol kiosk arrives weekly for the Friday prayers. The only disadvantages of the whole project are that the exit point from the compound is excessively narrow and extremely congested during Friday prayers, and there are no proper zebra crossings for people to cross the road. It is dangerous for pedestrians, particularly the elderly of Gopeng.
