= Hong Kong Logistic Support Regiment RLC =

British Army unit

- Active: 8 April 1994 – 31 May 1997
- Disbanded: 31 May 1997
- Countries: UK United Kingdom; British Hong Kong
- Allegiance: British Army
- Branch: Army
- Type: Support
- Role: Logistics
- Size: 500
- Garrison/HQ: Osborn Barracks, British Hong Kong
- Nickname: "The 1000-Day Regiment"

The Hong Kong Logistic Support Regiment RLC was a British Army regiment and affiliated to the Royal Logistic Corps. It was raised on 8 April 1994 to provide logistical support in British Hong Kong prior to the handover of Hong Kong to China. The regiment was disbanded on 31 May 1997, giving it the nickname of the "1000-Day Regiment" as its 1,181 days of operation made it probably the shortest lived peacetime regiment in the British Army.

== History ==
The Hong Kong Logistic Support Regiment was raised in order to consolidate all logistical operations of the Royal Logistic Corps in Hong Kong under a single command structure prior to the territory's handover from the United Kingdom to China. The regiment was put under the command of Lieutenant-Colonel Nigel Lloyd. It comprised 500 men and continued the work the Royal Logistics Corps had been doing for British Forces Overseas Hong Kong and was envisaged that it would do so until 1997. The regiment was based at Osborn Barracks in Kowloon. 29 Squadron of The Queen's Own Gurkha Transport Regiment from the Brigade of Gurkhas was transferred to the newly formed regiment to assist.

The Regiment was disbanded on 31 May 1997 after 1,181 days of service, making them potentially the shortest raised regiment in the peacetime history of the British Army. They were also the last British Army regiment to occupy Osborn Barracks before it was used to host some of the advance guard of the Hong Kong Garrison of the Chinese People's Liberation Army prior to the handover on 1 July.
