= Edward Youde Aviary =

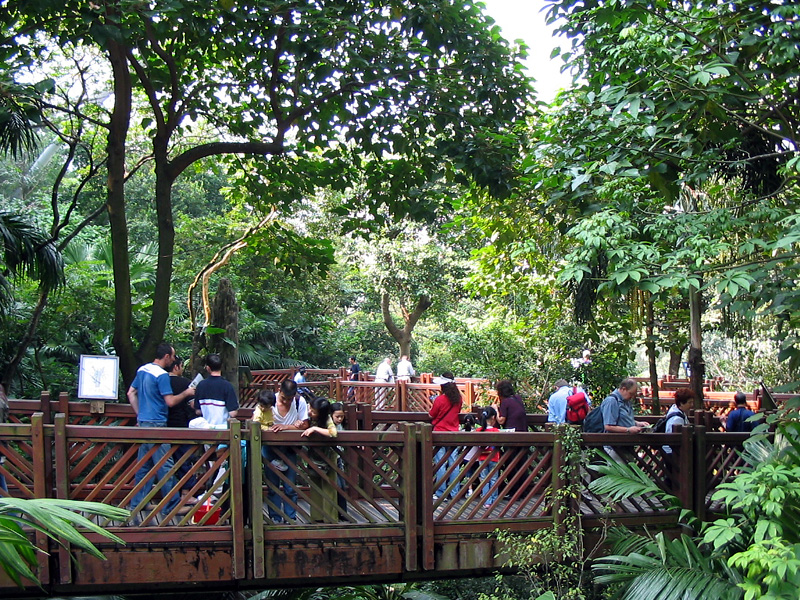
- Inside the aviary
- Interactive map of Edward Youde Aviary
- 22.2765558°N 114.1605727°E
- Date opened: September 1992; 33 years ago
- Location: Central, Hong Kong
- Land area: 3,000 m^{2} (32,000 sq ft)
- No. of animals: 600
- No. of species: 80

Edward Youde Aviary
- Traditional Chinese: 尤德觀鳥園
- Simplified Chinese: 尤德观鸟园
Transcriptions
Standard Mandarin
- Hanyu Pinyin: Yóudé Guānniǎoyuán
Yue: Cantonese
- Jyutping: jau4 dak1 gun1 niu5 jyun4

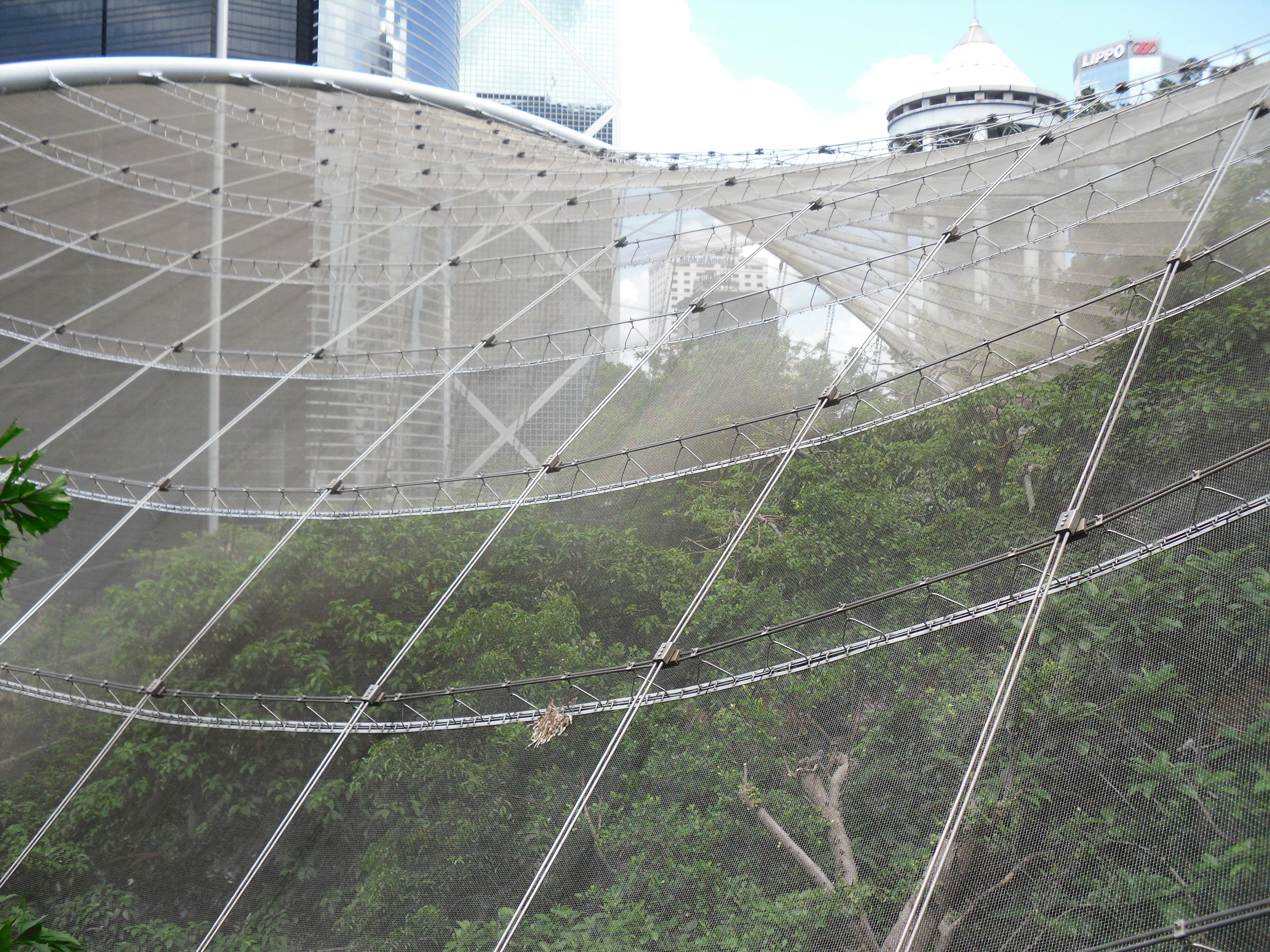
Edward Youde Aviary look from the outside

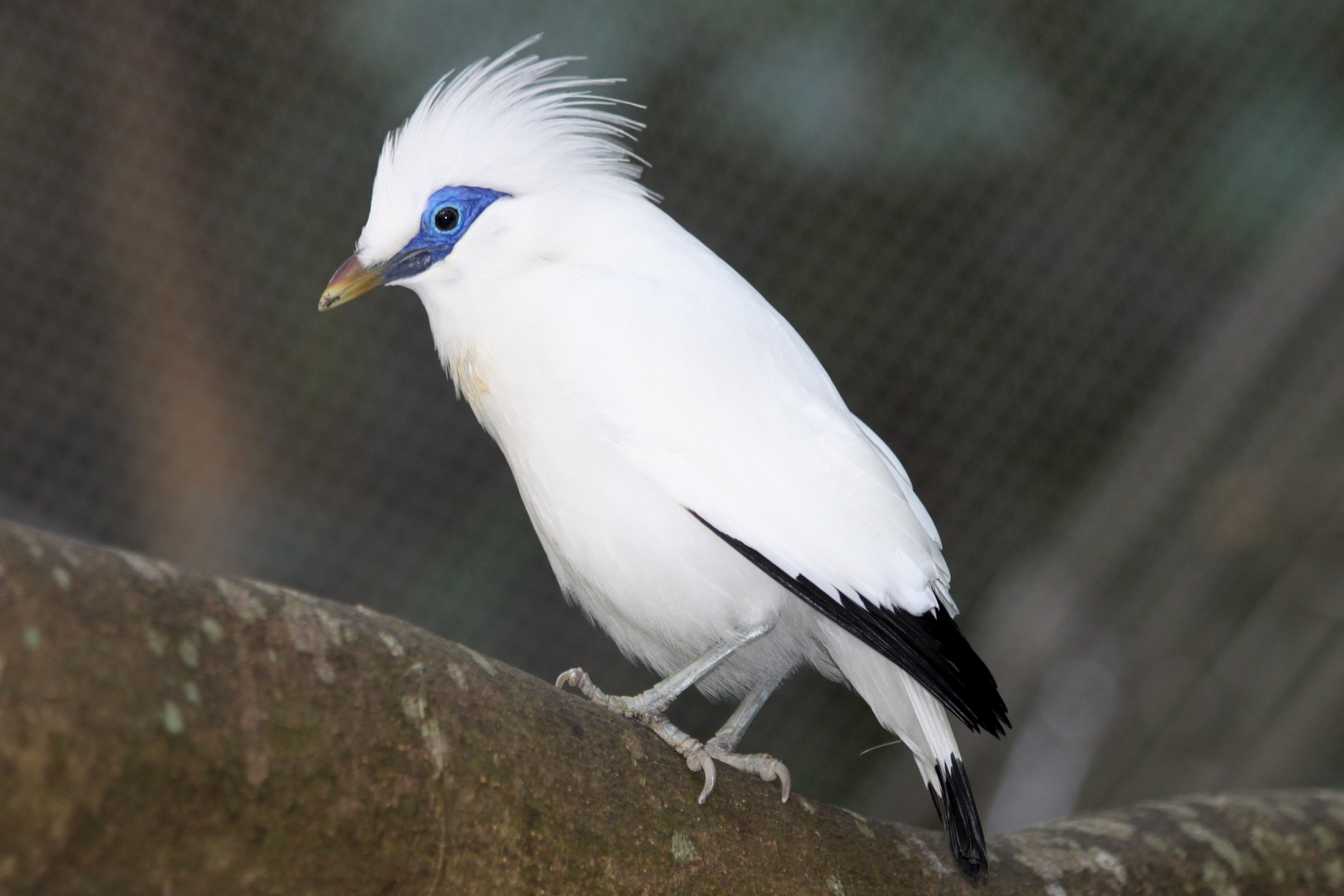
Bali mynah in aviary

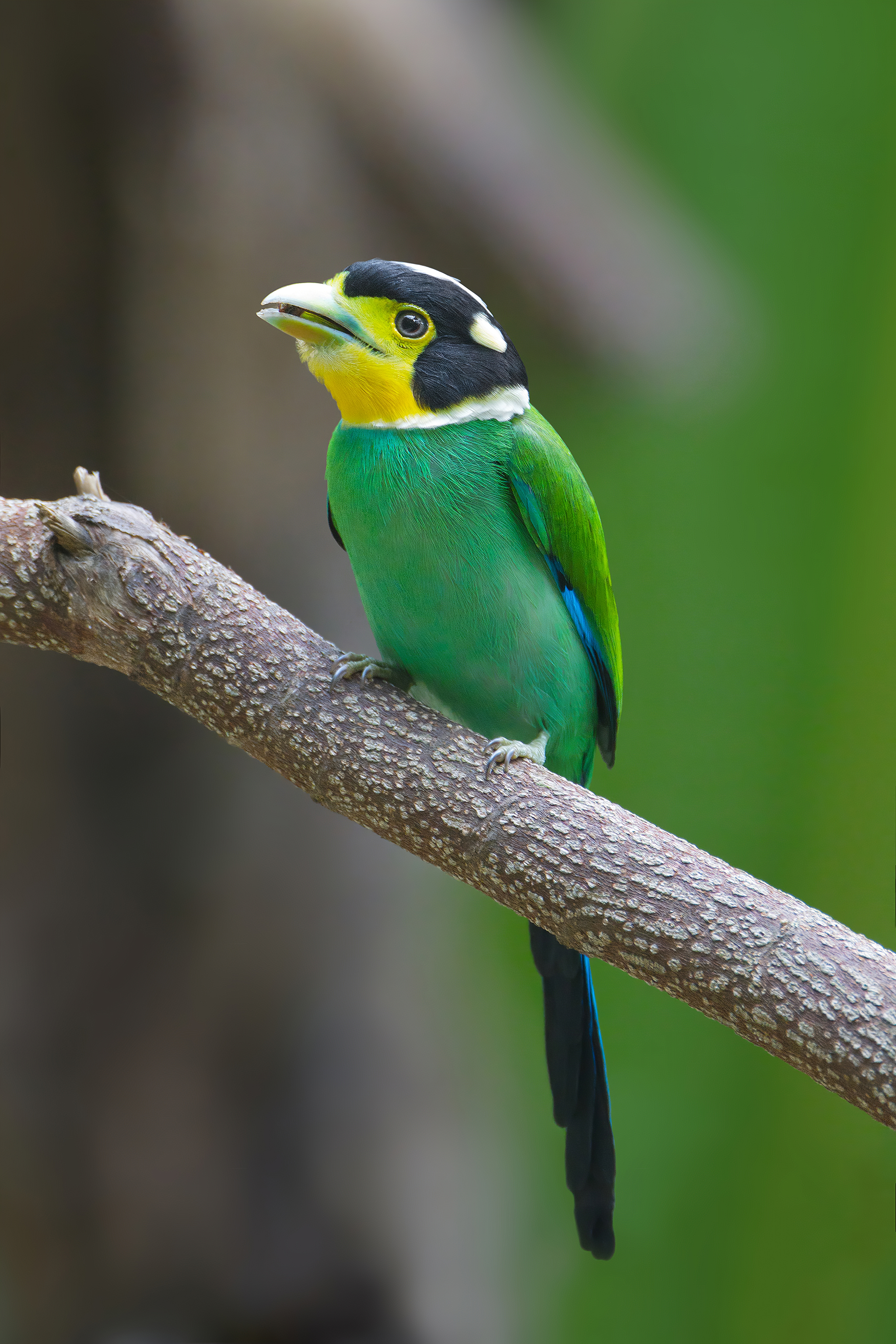
Long-tailed broadbill

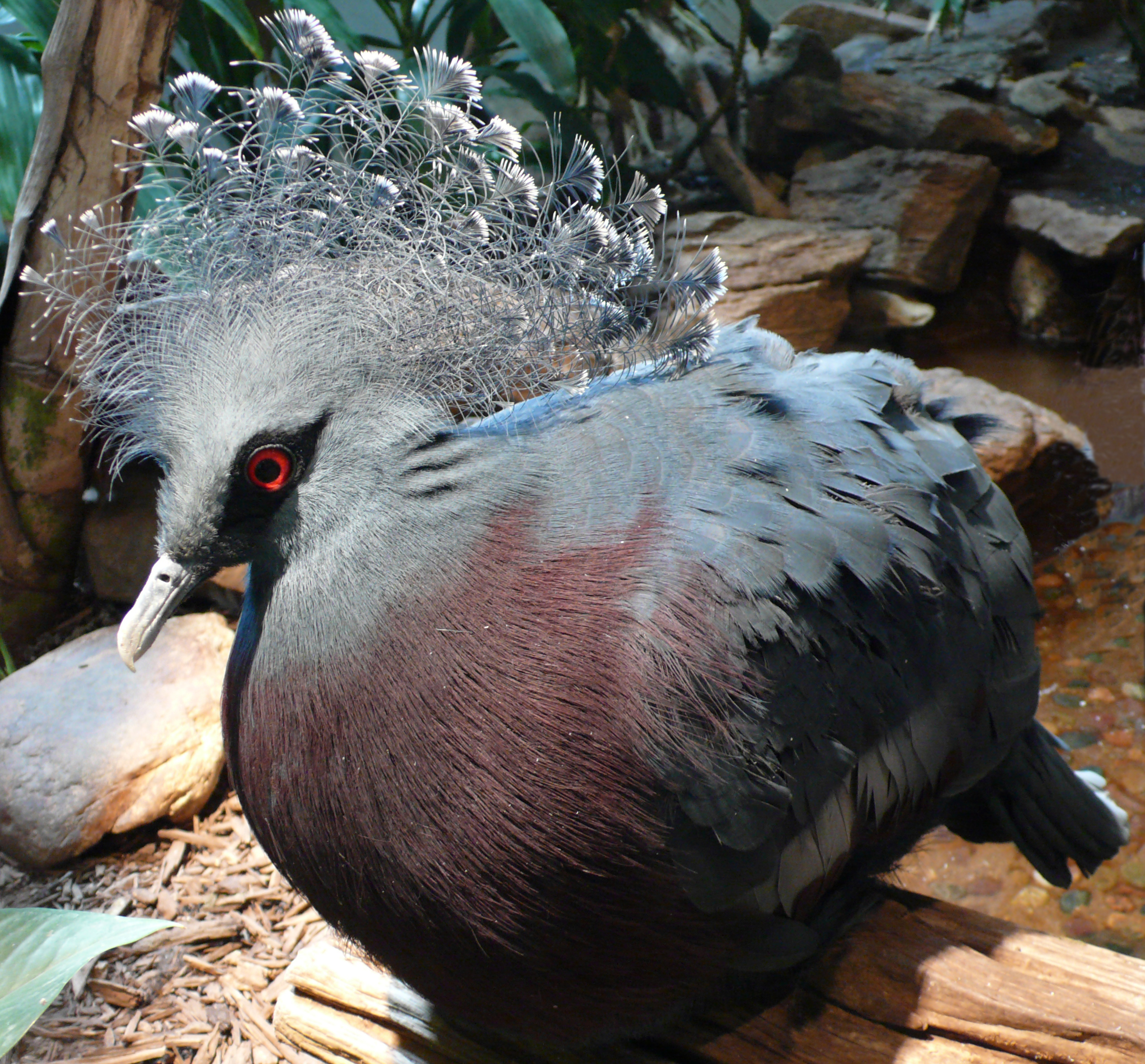
Victoria Crowned Pigeon

The Edward Youde Aviary (Chinese: 尤德觀鳥園) is a 3,000-square-metre (32,000 sq ft) aviary built over a natural valley at the southern corner of Hong Kong Park, which is located in Central at the bottom of the north eastern slope of Victoria Peak in Hong Kong. The Edward Youde Aviary was opened to the public in September 1992 and managed by the Urban Council. The aviary, largest in Southeast Asia, is named after the late Sir Edward Youde, the Governor of Hong Kong from 1982 to 1986.

The valley is bounded by an east-facing slope fully covered with natural vegetation and a west-facing slope previously occupied by a barracks. It has a highest point of 46.5 metres (153 ft) and a lowest point of 30 metres (98 ft) above the valley floor.

This walk-through aviary features a collection of 600 birds representing 80 species indigenous to Southeast Asia, Indonesia, and New Guinea. Ground-dwelling birds including pheasants, leafbirds, partridges, pigeons and thrushes. Great argus pheasants proclaim their presence by ringing territorial calls and give one of the most elaborate courtship displays in the bird world.

The entrance to the aviary consists of a small rectangular building. This building holds on display different types of eggs.

== Waterfowl lake ==
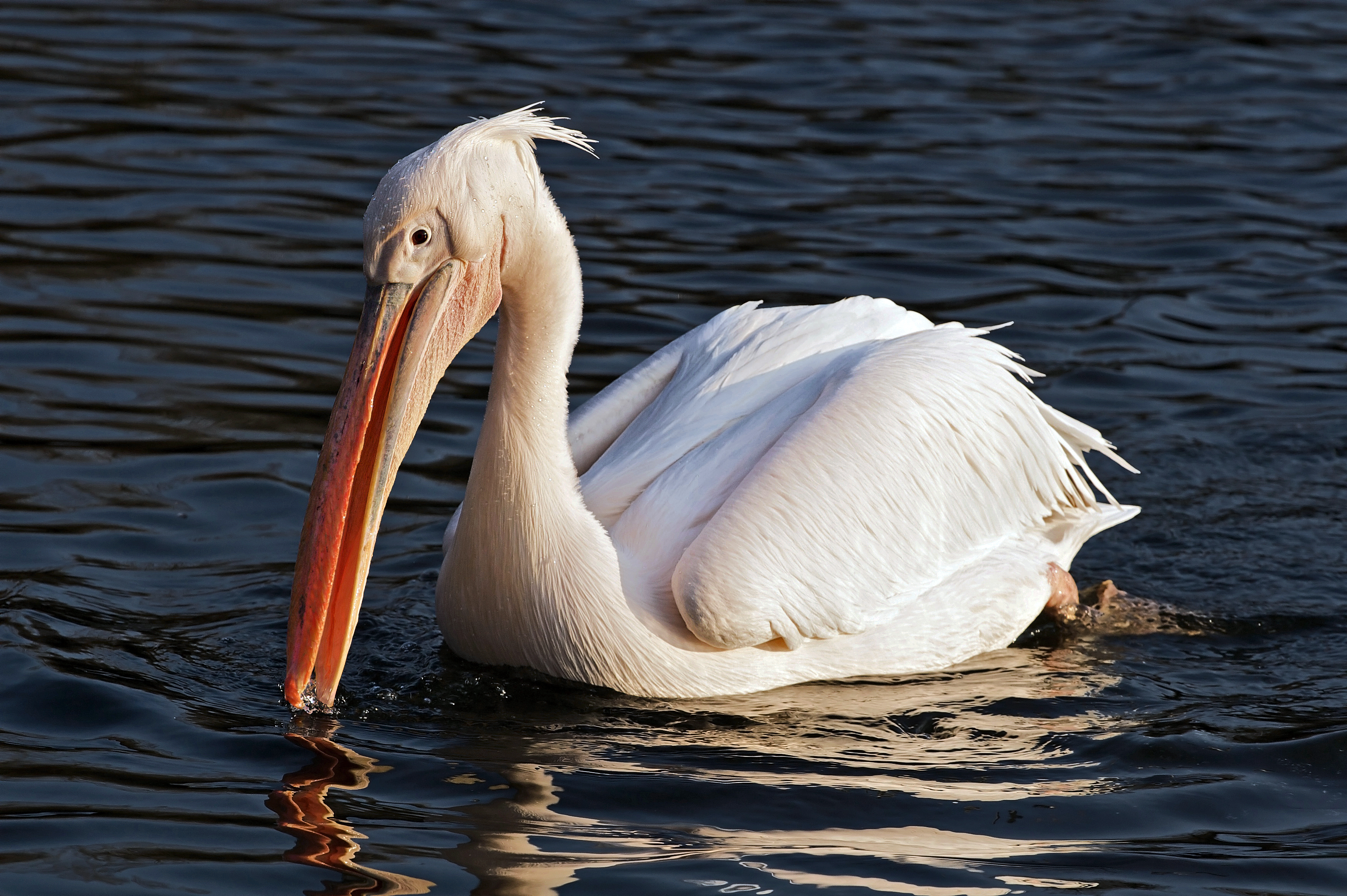
great white pelican

The waterfowl lake linked with Edward Youde Aviary by an inner lake is landscaped to form a swamp to accommodate different species of waterfowl. Some attractive species found in the waterfowl lake are the Australian pelican, great white pelican and radjah shelduck.

== Caged display area ==
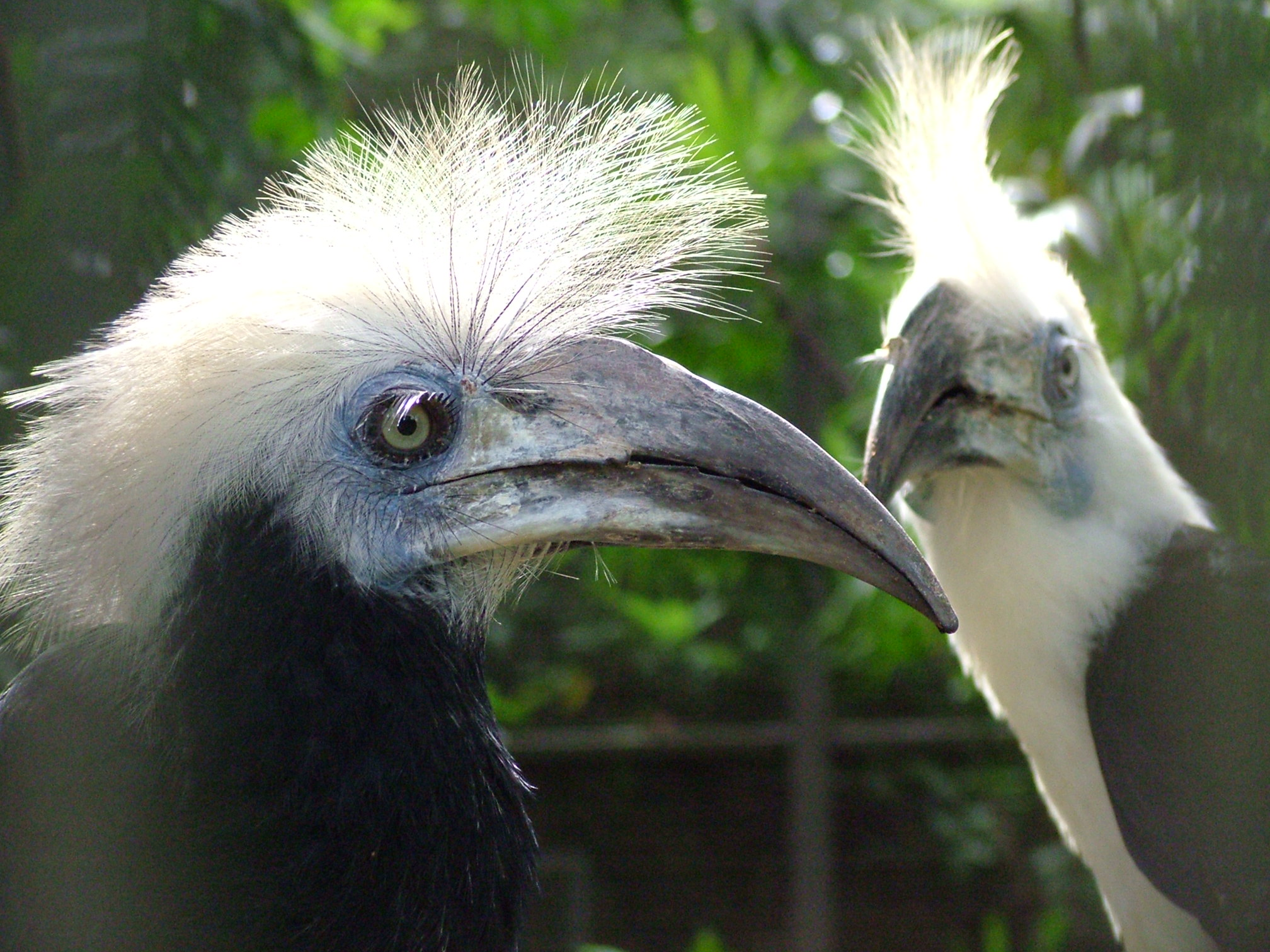
White-crowned Hornbill

Some of the characteristic birds cannot be housed in the main aviary. Large hornbills predate smaller birds, they can only be seen in the three smaller display cages. Three displays let visitors view at a close range. Two cages house the white-crested hornbill and the great pied hornbill, while the other holds various species of birds of the Malesian region.

== Outdoor learning activities ==
During the school term, park staff will conduct educational programmes for school children. Staff will also arrange guided tours for groups. However, the organizer should make prior arrangements with the office.

== See also ==
- List of urban public parks and gardens of Hong Kong
- Hong Kong Zoological and Botanical Gardens
