= Gopeng =

Town in Perak, Malaysia

- Town

Other transcription(s)
  - Chinese: 务边
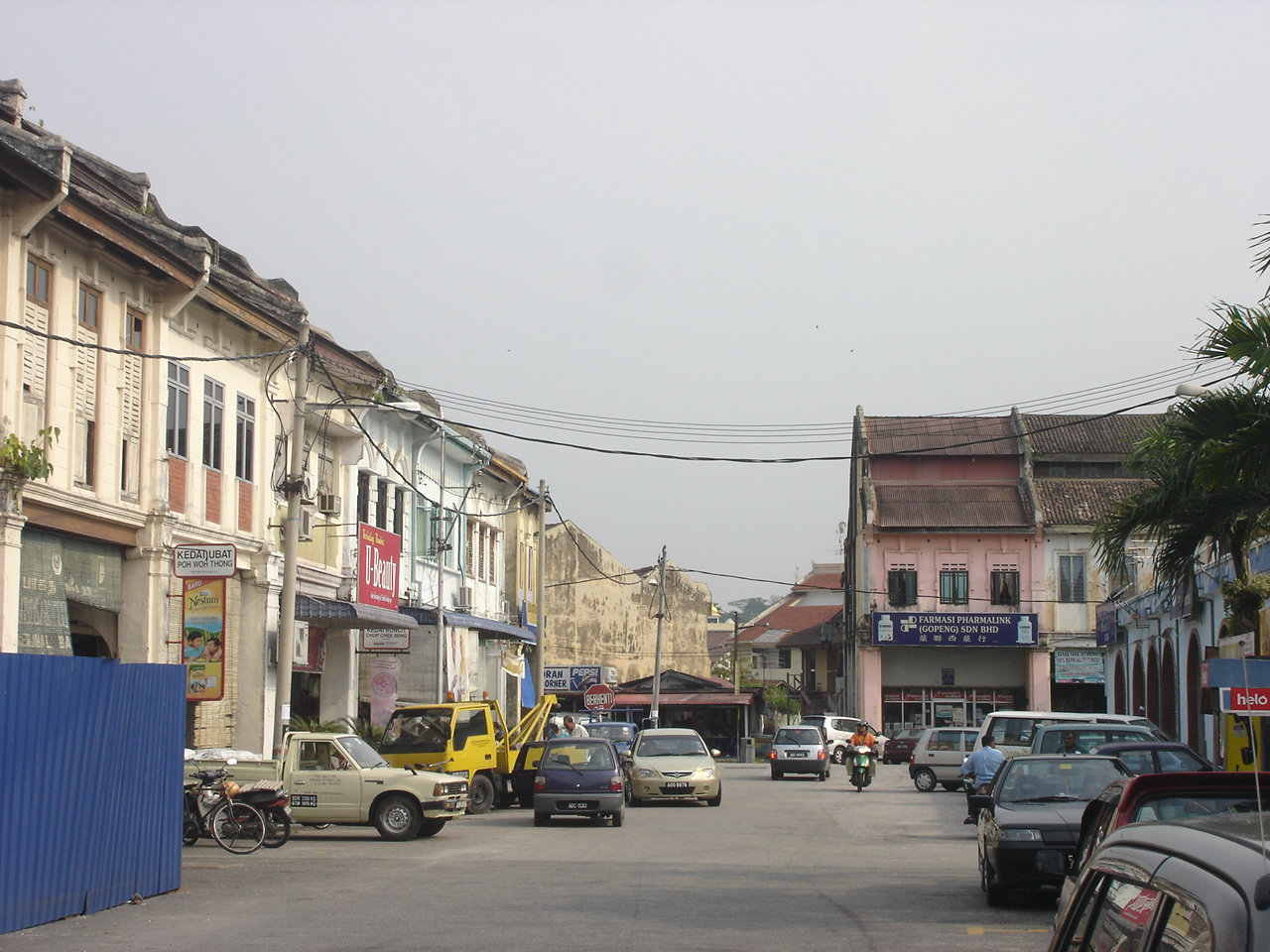
- Street of Gopeng Town

- Location of Gopeng within Peninsular Malaysia
- Coordinates: 4.4717°N 101.1654°E
- Country: Malaysia
- State: Perak
- District: Kampar

Gopeng (Jawi: ڬوڤيڠ, Chinese: 务边) is a town located in Mukim Teja, Kampar District, Perak, Malaysia. It is situated approximately 20 km (12 mi) south of Ipoh, the state capital.

== History ==
Gopeng was the most important town in the Kinta Valley until 1890, when Ipoh became more prominent. Gopeng was intensively mined by both European and Chinese miners, the latter having significant Hakka representation under Chung Keng Kwee, the leader of the Hai San secret society during the Larut War. He was appointed as the Kapitan Cina after the Pangkor Treaty, and although his main homes were in Taiping and Penang, he maintained his foothold in Gopeng, securing contracts for street lighting there in 1892 as well as building quarters for civil servants thereafter. For the first few decades after British intervention, Gopeng was run by a tripartite; the Europeans, the Chinese led by the Eu family, and the Sumatrans by the Assistant Penghulu Imam Prang Ja Barumun. Gopeng is also one of the first places where large numbers of Orang Asli came into contact with outsiders in the 19th century.

== Amenities ==
- Pejabat Pos Gopeng
- Balai Polis Gopeng
- Gopeng Fire and Rescue Station
- RTC Gopeng
- Padang Bandaran Gopeng
- Gopeng Baru Jamek Mosque

=== Commercial services ===
- Pasar Awam Gopeng
- Medan Purnama
- Hup Teck Soy Sauce Factory
- Gopeng Light Industrial Park

== Transportation ==
=== Road network ===
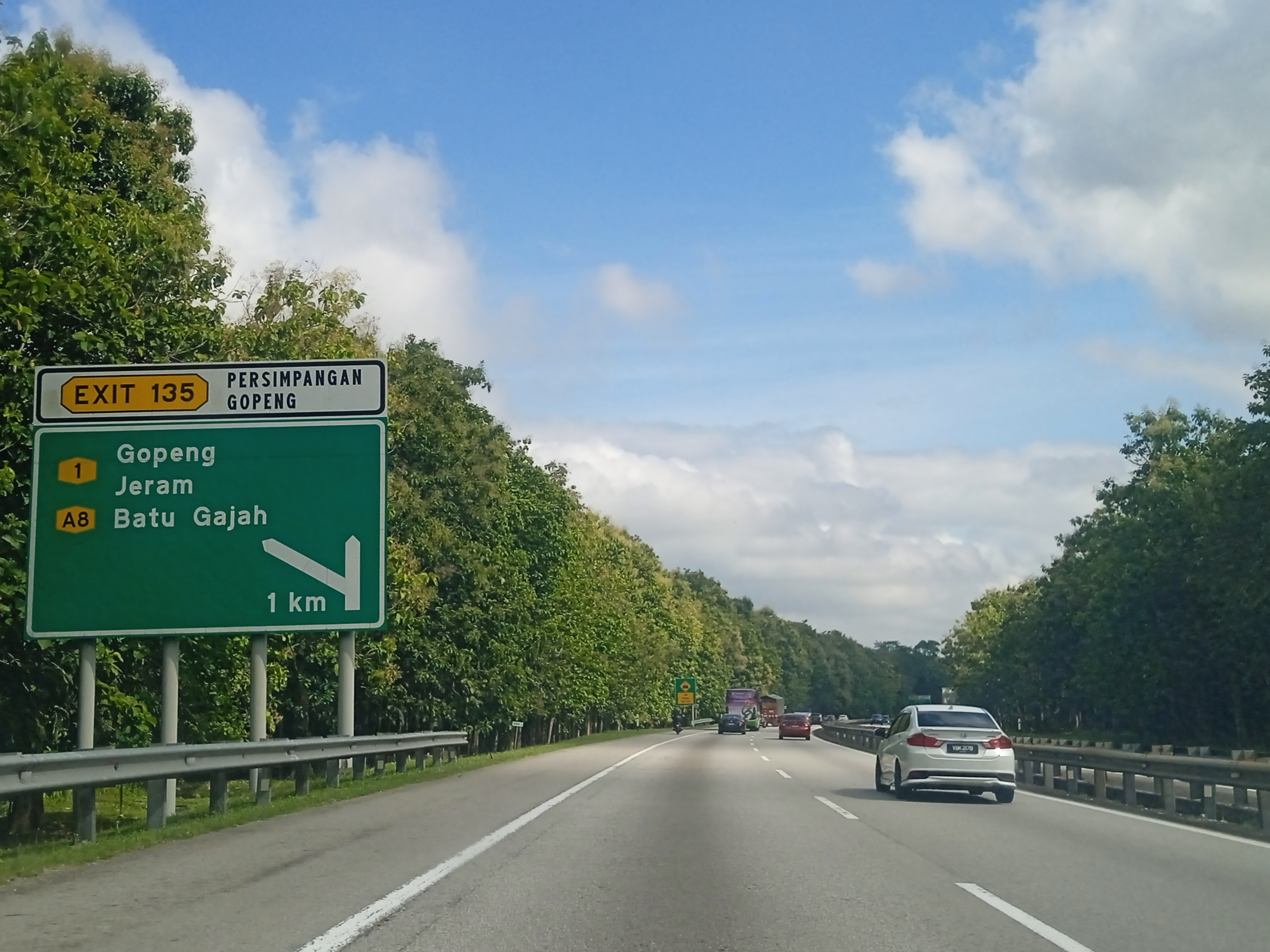
E1 towards Gopeng Interchange

Gopeng is located on the west side of the North-South Expressway (E1) stretch of Tapah–Simpang Pulai. The expressway cuts through the karst landscape of the Kinta Valley on the western foothills of the Titiwangsa Mountains. The Tapah–Gopeng stretch is one of the most scenic routes on the west coast of Peninsular Malaysia. On clear days, the Lata Kinjang waterfall can be seen on the right side of the highway for travelers heading up north to Gopeng.

=== Bus ===
- Stesen Bas Gopeng

== Education ==
=== Primary schools ===
==== Vernacular schools ====
- SJK (C) Man Ming
- SJK (C) New Kopisan
- SJK (C) Lawan Kuda Baru

==== National schools ====
- SK Gopeng Taman Gopeng Baru (previous building now Pusat Giat Mara)
- SK Gopeng Jalan Ilmu (previous English School Gopeng)
- SK Sungai Itek
- SK Ulu Geruntum

=== Secondary schools ===
- SMK Idris Shah
- SMK Seri Teja
- Sekolah Berasrama Penuh Integrasi

=== Tertiary institutions ===
- Perak Matriculation College
- Kolej Komuniti RTC Gopeng
- Akademi Kemahiran KEMAS Gopeng

== Tourist attractions ==
- Tempurung Cave
- Gopeng Heritage House
- Gaharu Tea Valley
- Taman Herba Negeri Perak
- My Gopeng Resort
- Nomad Adventure Sdn Bhd

== Notable personalities born in Gopeng ==
- Lat - Malaysian cartoonist, winner of the Fukuoka Asian Culture Prize in 2002
- Burhanuddin al-Helmy - Malaysian politician, President of the Malaysian Islamic Party (PAS) from 1956 to his death in October 1969
- Chew Swee Kee - Singaporean politician, served as Minister of Education from 1955 to around 1959
- Rashid Maidin - senior leader of the Communist Party of Malaya (CPM).
