= Hong Kong Park =

Public park in Central, Hong Kong

Coordinates: 22°16′39″N 114°9′42″E

- 香港公園
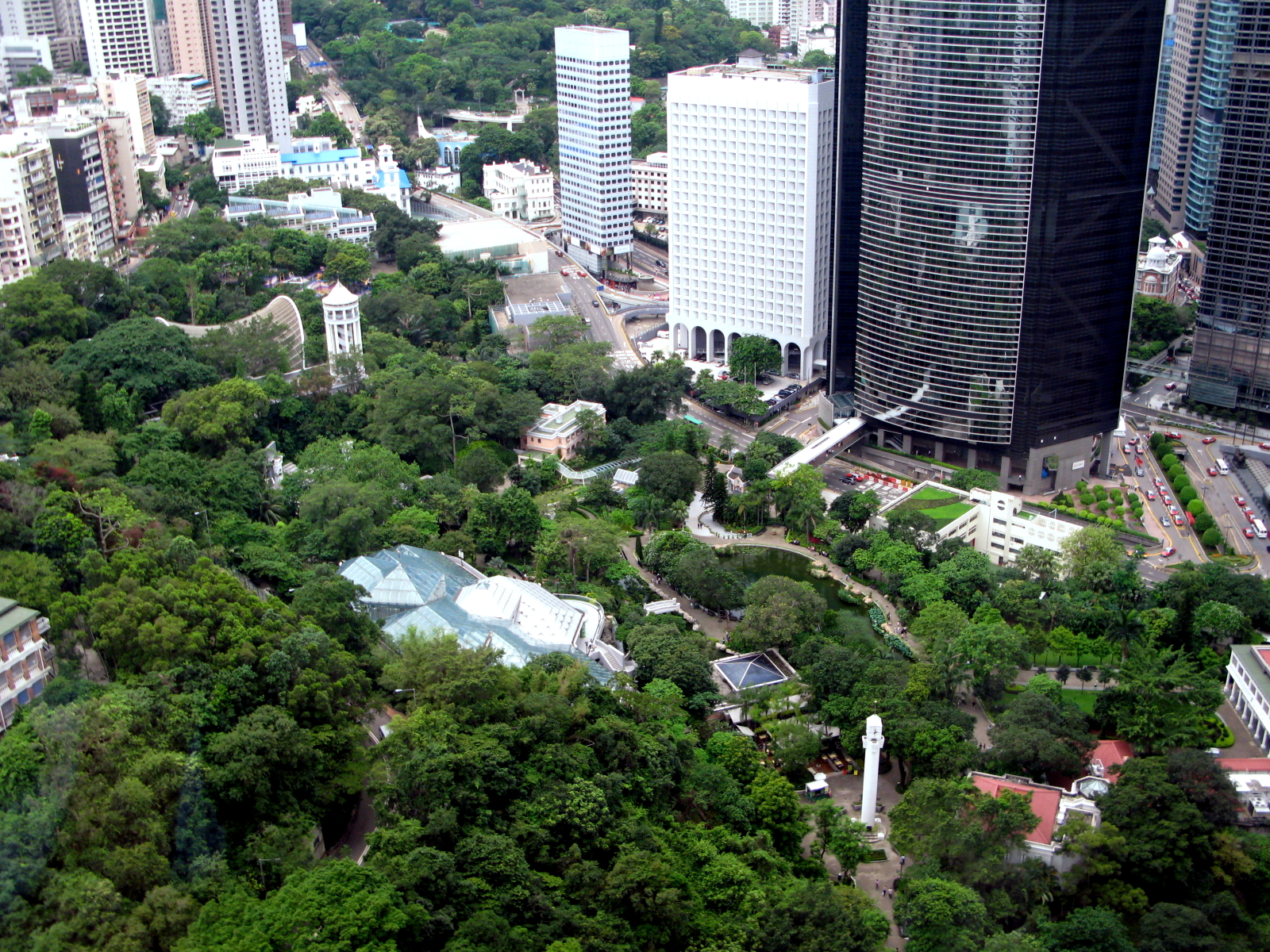
- Aerial view
- Interactive map of Hong Kong Park
- Location: Central, Hong Kong
- Area: 8 hectares (20 acres)
- Opened: 23 May 1991; 35 years ago
- Operator: Leisure and Cultural Services Department
- Open: Year round
- Public transit: Tram stop (25 m); Peak Tram terminus (30 m); Admiralty station (200 m)

Hong Kong Park
- Traditional Chinese: 香港公園
- Simplified Chinese: 香港公园
Transcriptions
Standard Mandarin
- Hanyu Pinyin: Xiānggǎng Gōngyuán
Yue: Cantonese
- Yale Romanization: Hēung góng gūng yùhn
- Jyutping: Hoeng1 gong2 gung1 jyun2
- IPA: [hœ̂ːŋkɔ̌ːŋ kʊ́ŋjy̌ːn]

Hong Kong Park is a public park next to Cotton Tree Drive in Central, Hong Kong. Built at a cost of HK$398 million and opened on 23 May 1991, it covers an area of 80,000 square metres (860,000 sq ft) and is an example of modern design and facilities blending with natural landscape.

== History ==
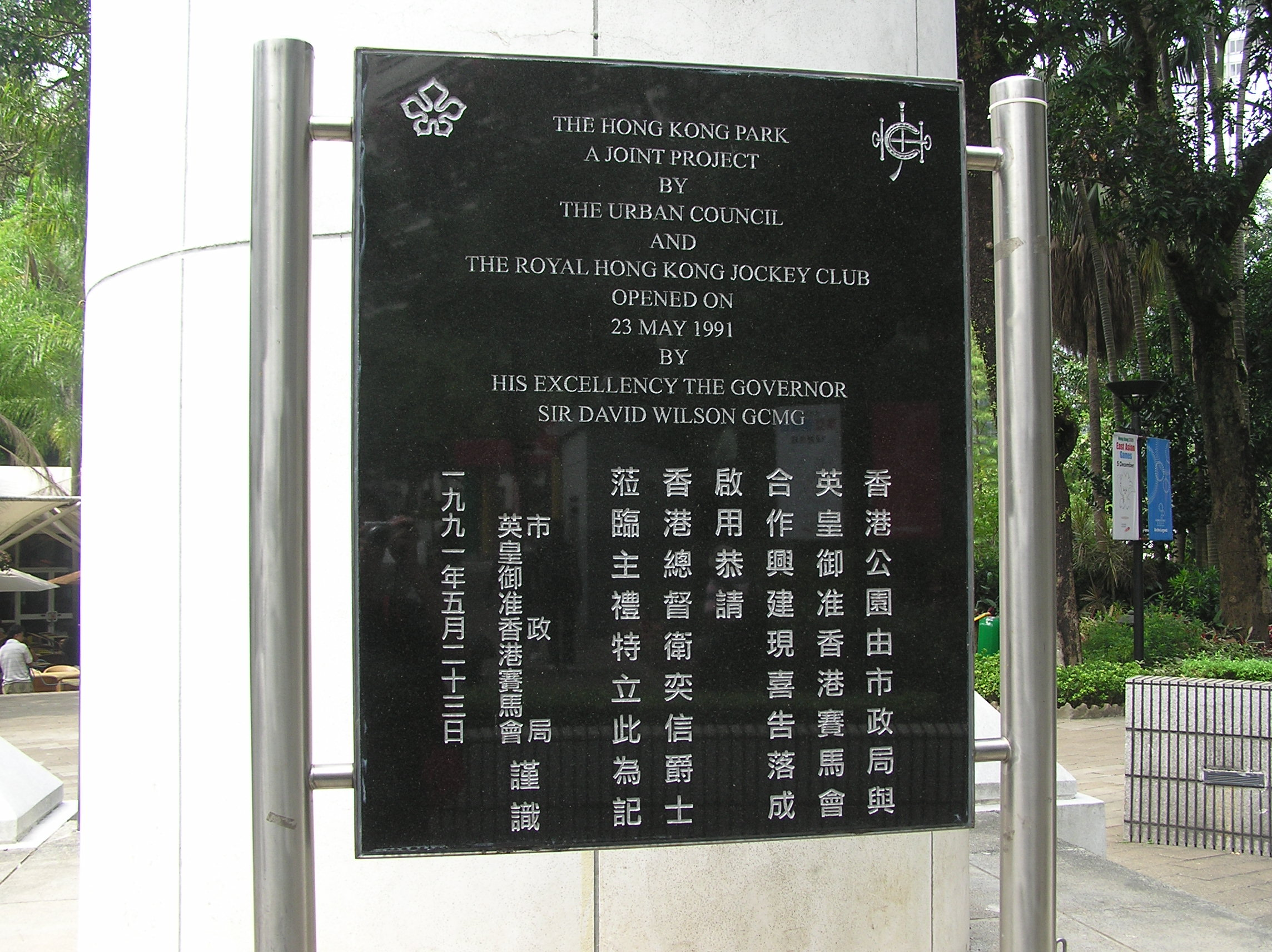
The commemorative plaque in the park

Part of the site was known as Cantonment Hill in early colonial days in 1841. At the upper part of the former location of the Victoria Barracks, built between 1867 and 1910, the barracks were handed to the government in 1979. Glenealy Junior School occupied part of this site up until 1988. After the school vacated the site, the area was turned into the present park. Hong Kong Park was officially opened on 23 May 1991 by Sir David Wilson, the Governor of Hong Kong at that time. It covers an area of 8 hectares and is an outstanding example of modern design and facilities blending with the natural landscape.

The construction of the park was a joint project by the Urban Council (dissolved in 1999) and the Royal Hong Kong Jockey Club (renamed the Hong Kong Jockey Club in 1996).

== Historic buildings ==
- Flagstaff House (1846), since 1984 housing the Flagstaff House Museum of Teaware

A few historic buildings of former Victoria Barracks were also conserved in the park, including:

- Cassels Block (early 20th century), former barracks for married British officers. Now housing the Hong Kong Visual Arts Centre since 1992
- Rawlinson House (early 20th century), former house of the British Deputy General, converted in the 1980s into Cotton Tree Drive Marriage Registry and the office of the park.
- Wavell House (early 20th century), former quarters for married British officers, converted in 1991 into the aviary support centre (Education Centre).

These historic buildings are graded as Grade II Historic Buildings.

The park can be easily reached by walking through the Pacific Place and its nearby escalator.

== Facilities ==
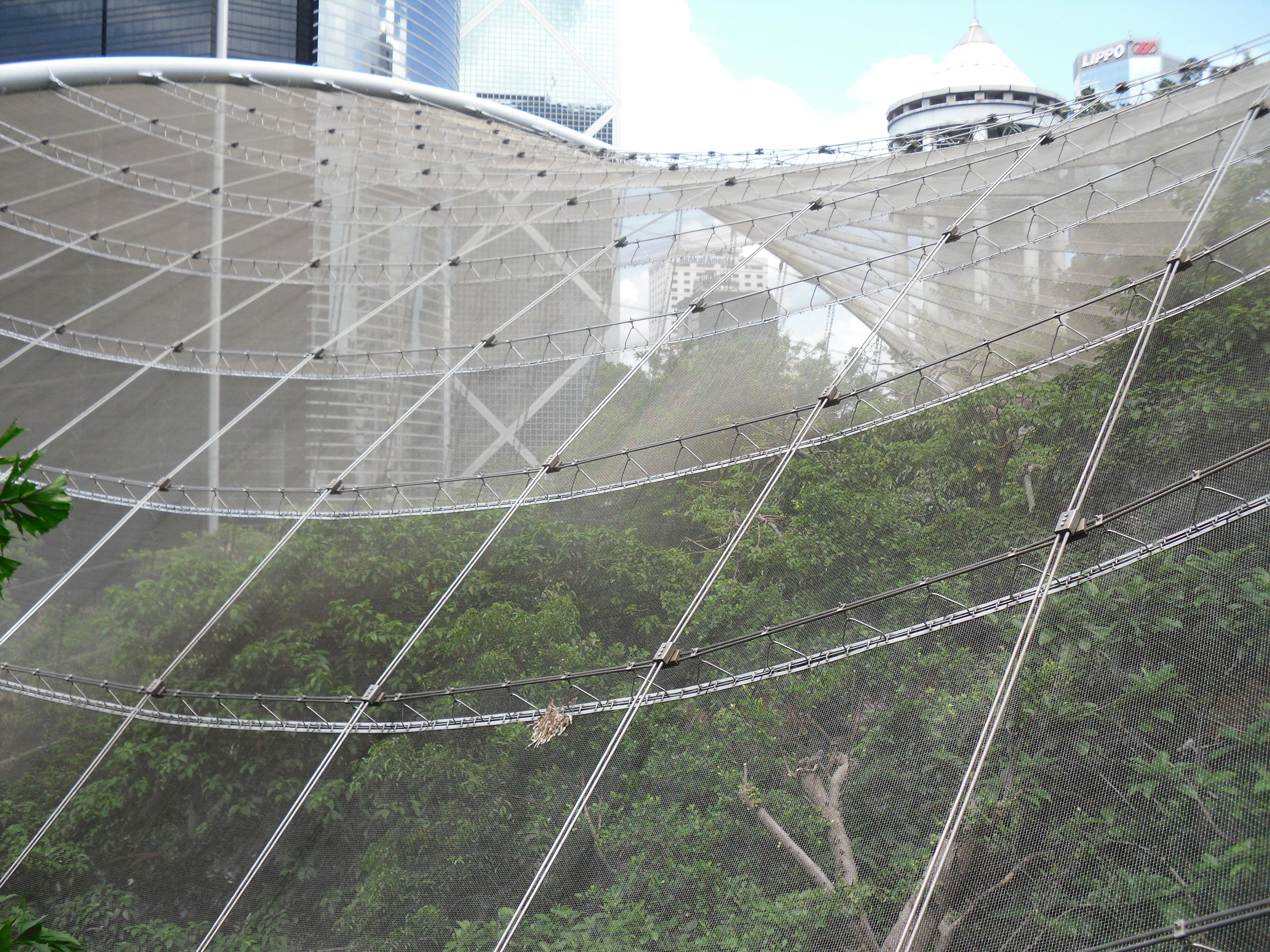
Edward Youde Aviary

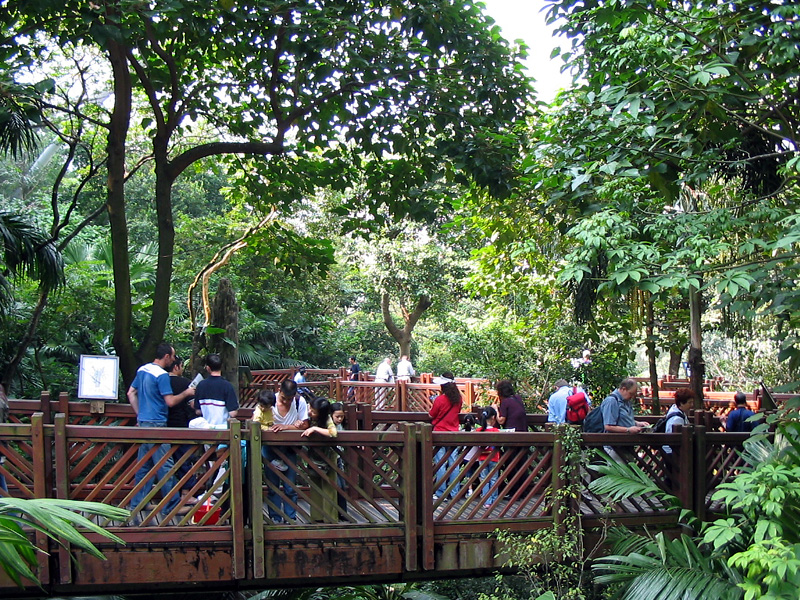
Inside the aviary

Hong Kong Park captures the natural landscape in the busy and crowded business centre. Its main feature is Edward Youde Aviary which is Hong Kong's largest aviary while the Vantage Point is another great place to see the "bird exhibition". There is also a greenhouse (Forsgate Conservatory) which holds "plant exhibition" such as "Orchid Exhibition" temporarily. There are also many modern gardens, including Garden Plaza and tai chi Garden. To suit the sport-lovers, a sport centre and a squash centre were also built in Hong Kong Park.

== Awards ==
- The design of the park won Honour Award for Urban Design (1998) of Hong Kong Chapter, the American Institute of Architects.
- The park was awarded as one of the Top Ten Buildings of the 90s by a building journal in March 2000.

== Gallery ==
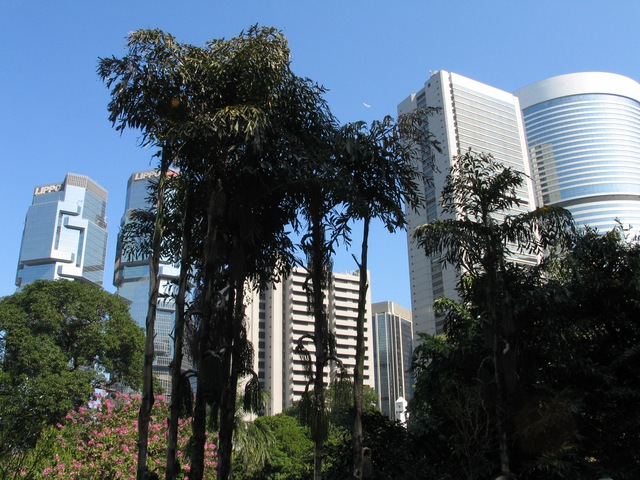
Hong Kong Park is surrounded by skyscrapers in the highly urbanised central business district

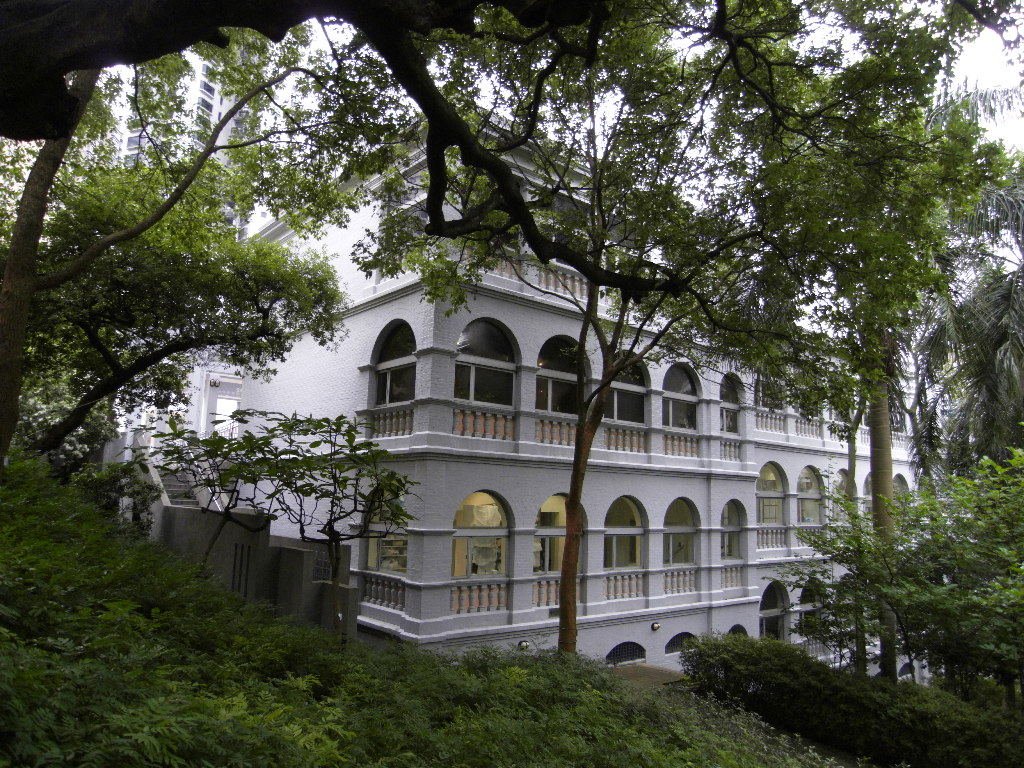
Hong Kong Visual Arts Centre in Hong Kong Park

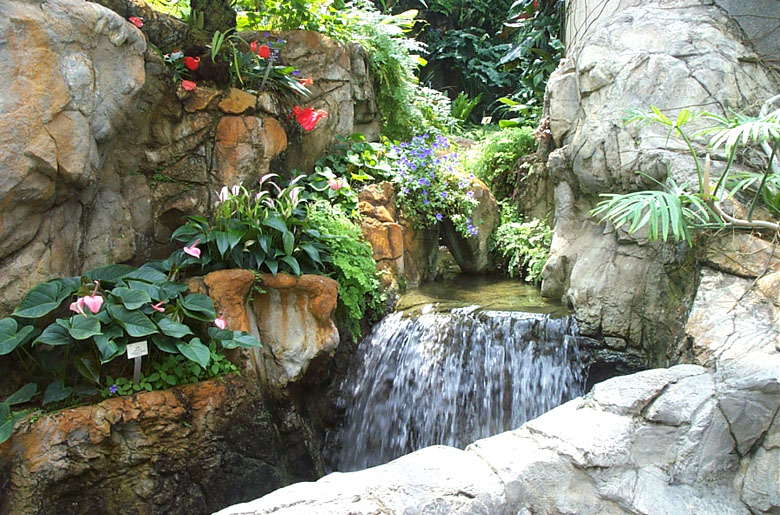
The greenhouse in Hong Kong Park

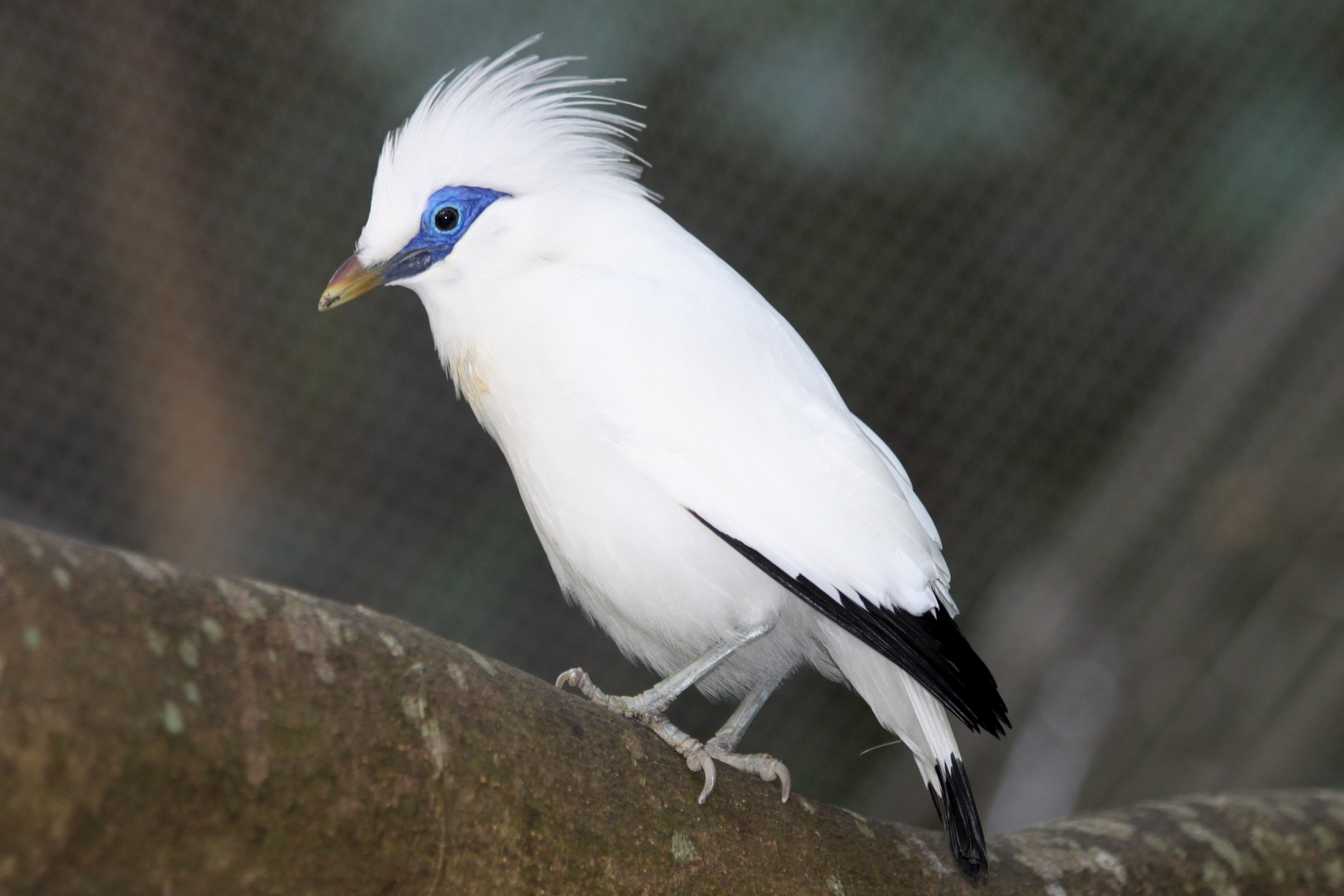
Bali starling in aviary at Hong Kong Park

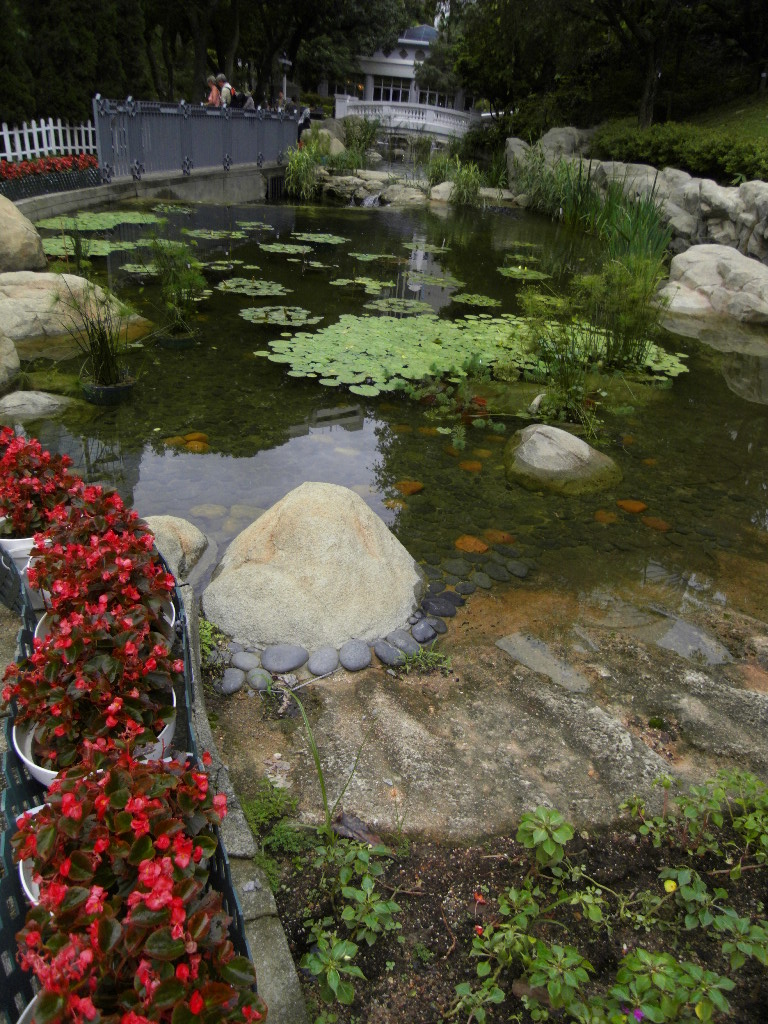
Artificial Lake in Hong Kong Park

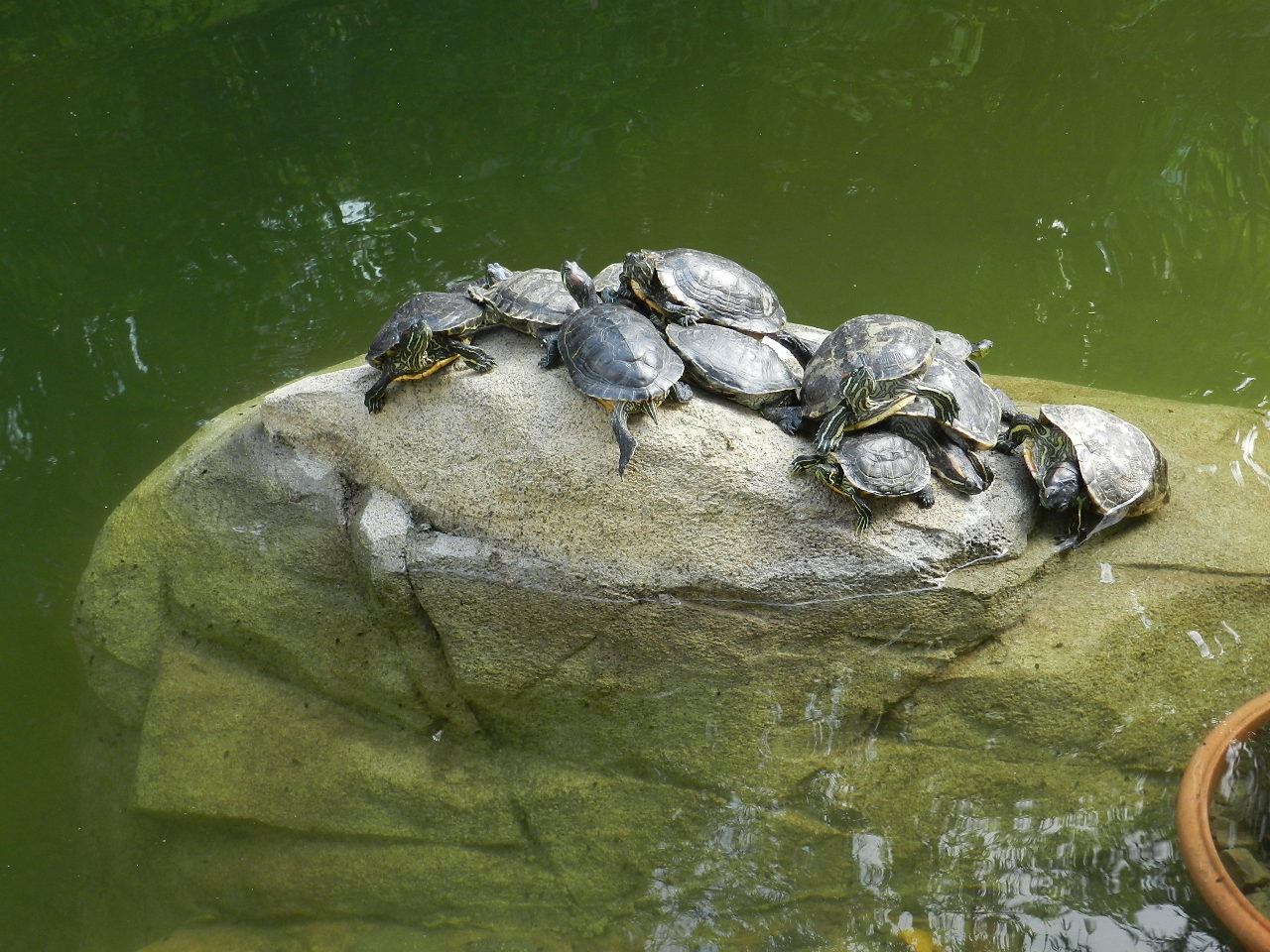
Turtles in Hong Kong Park

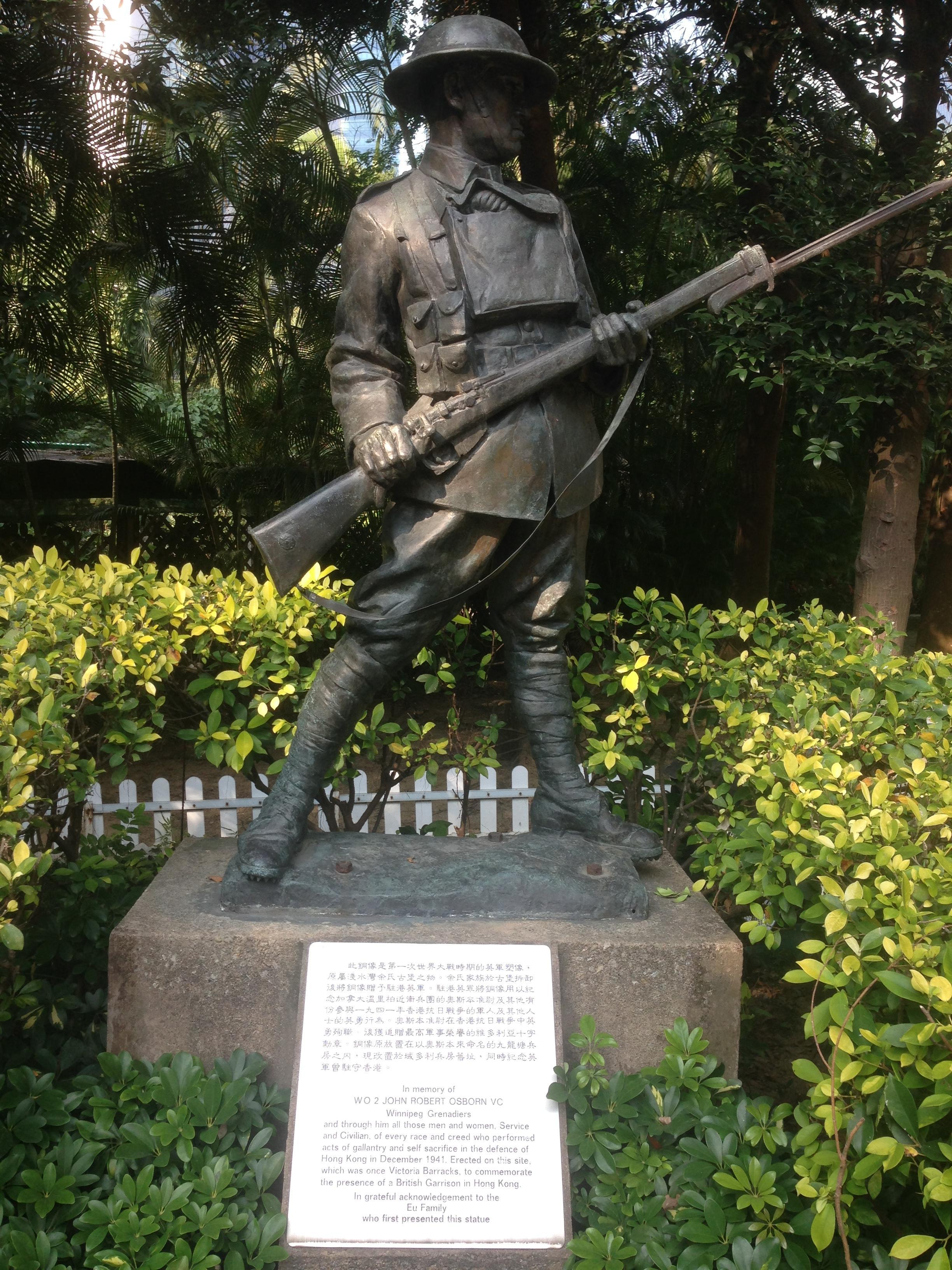
Statue of an anonymous World War I soldier from statuary collection of Eu Tong Sen. Also visible is the Battle of Hong Kong memorial plaque dedicated to all the defenders of Hong Kong in December 1941 through John Robert Osborn.

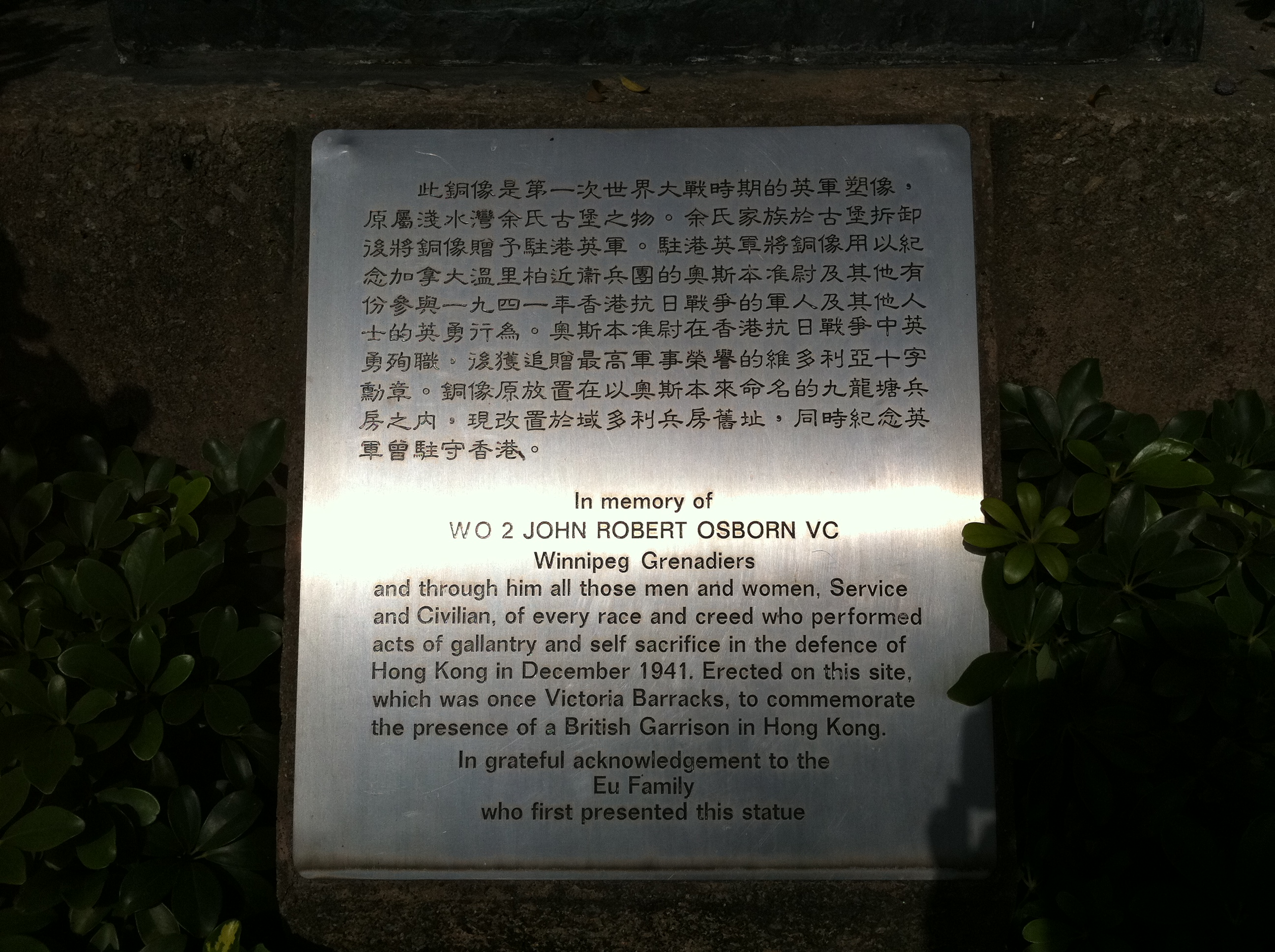
Memorial plaque dedicated to all the defenders of Hong Kong in December 1941 through John Robert Osborn and to commemorate the British Garrison at Hong Kong.

== See also ==
- List of buildings and structures in Hong Kong
- List of urban public parks and gardens of Hong Kong
