= Perak State Herb Park =

Park in Kinta, Perak, Malaysia

- Taman Herba Negeri Perak
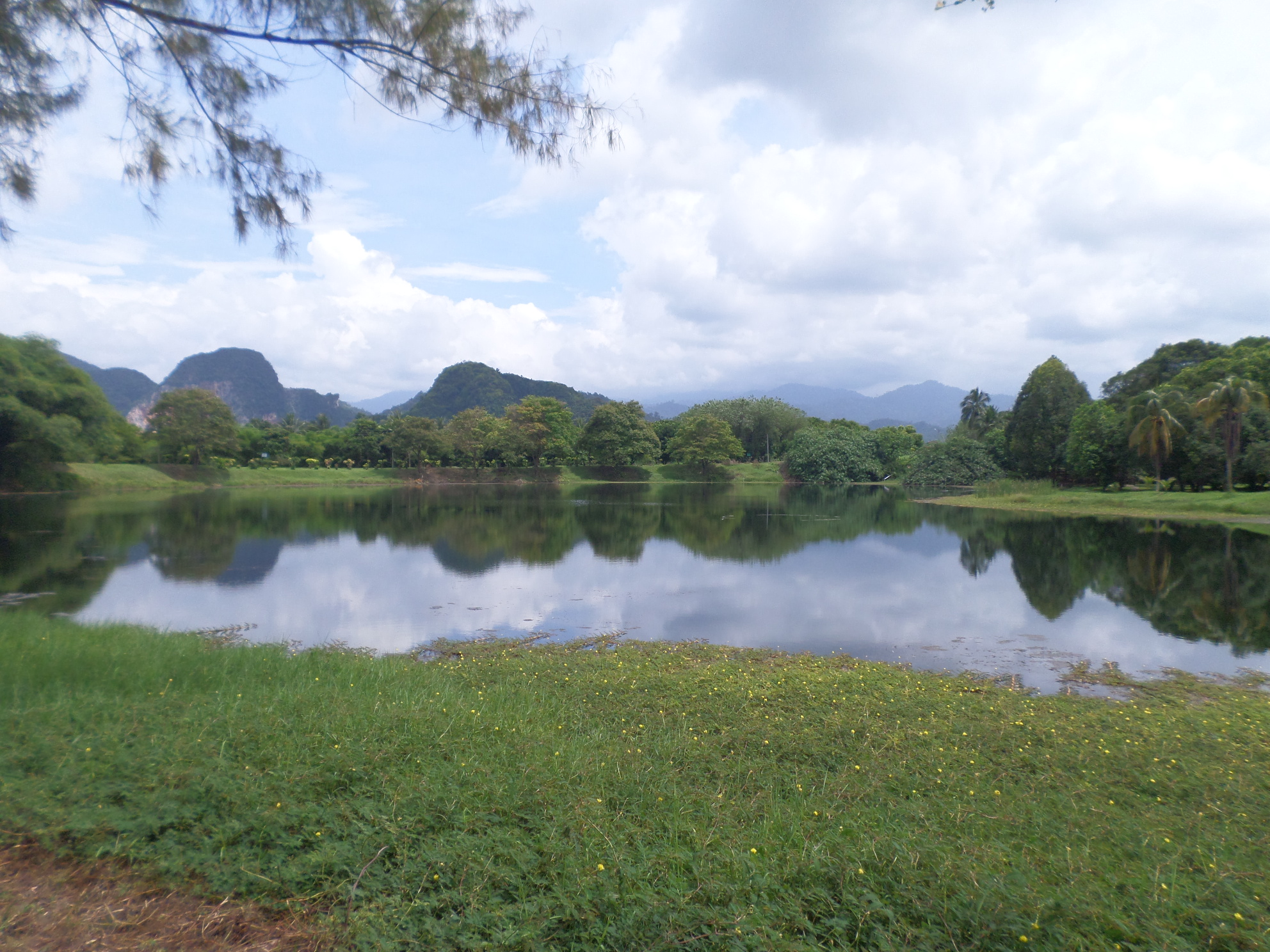
- Interactive map of Perak State Herb Park
- Type: park
- Location: Kinta, Perak, Malaysia
- Coordinates: 2°22′45.8″N 102°19′42.9″E
- Area: 22 hectares (54 acres)
- Opening: 18 June 2009

The Perak State Herb Park (Malay: Taman Herba Negeri Perak) is a park in Batu Gajah, Kinta District, Perak, Malaysia.

== History ==
The park used to be an abandoned tin mining area. Since 1987, the area had been used for vegetable plantation. In 2002, Perak Chief Minister Tajol Rosli Mohd Ghazali suggested the establishment of the Perak State Herb Park. Since then, various plants have been planted at the park. The park was officially opened on 18 June 2009 by Perak Sultan Azlan Shah.

== Geology ==
The park consists of more than 500 different species of plants.

== Activities ==
Various activities can be done in this park, such as cycling, camping, trekking, fishing etc.

== Facilities ==
The park is equipped with car parks, toilet, prayer room, camping field, hall etc.

== Opening time ==
The park is opened on weekdays from 8:00 a.m. to 5:00 p.m.

== See also ==
- List of tourist attractions in Perak
