= Eu Tong Sen =

Chinese businessman

Eu Tong Sen OBE RM
- 余東旋
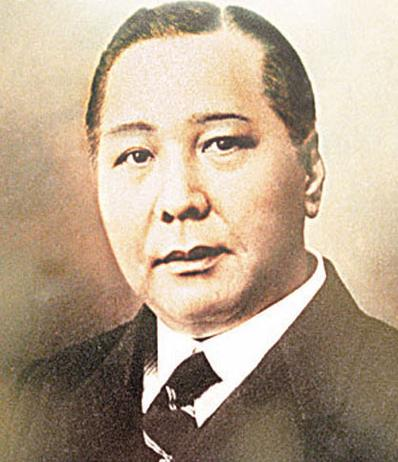
- Eu Tong Sen
- Born: 23 July 1877; Penang, Straits Settlement (now part of Malaysia)
- Died: 11 May 1941 (aged 63); Hong Kong
- Occupation: Businessman
- Spouse: 11
- Children: 13 sons 11 daughters
- Parents: Eu Kong Pui (father); Madam Leung Kum Yow (mother)

Eu Tong Sen
- Traditional Chinese: 余東旋
- Simplified Chinese: 余东旋
Transcriptions
Standard Mandarin
- Hanyu Pinyin: Yú Dōngxuán
Yue: Cantonese
- Jyutping: Jyu4 Dung1 Syun4
Southern Min
- Hokkien POJ: Jyu4 Dung1 Syun4 Gaai1

Eu Tong Sen OBE RM (Chinese: 余東旋; 23 July 1877 – 11 May 1941) was a businessman in Malaya, Singapore and Hong Kong during the late 19th and early 20th century. He was vice-president of the Anti-Opium Society and a member of the Kinta Sanitary Board.

== Early life ==
Eu was born in Penang, Malaya on 23 July 1877. His grandfather, He Song, a feng shui master, was originally from Jiangxi but moved to Foshan in Guangdong, China. His father, Eu Kong Pui (a.k.a. Eu Kong) became a Chinese immigrant from Foshan and went to Penang to work as a grocery shop assistant and later laid the foundation for his son's fortune by starting tin mining and other businesses. Eu's mother Leong Lay Yong stayed in Foshan until brought to Penang, where Eu Kong had married a second wife, Mun Woon Chang, who was well-connected in Malaya. Eu Kong died in Penang in 1890 at the age of 38.

Eu built his fortune by acquiring from the British, monopolies for tax or revenue farming (opium, alcohol or spirits, gambling and pawn broking) in Perak in the 1880s and when tin started to boom, he acquired land for mining tin. He expanded this to retailing and taxing goods from China that he sold to the miners he employed and set up a grocery shop in Gopeng that was later expanded to include a Chinese dispensary for Chinese immigrants. He operated his businesses under the mark Chop Yan Sang. He had two younger brothers, Eu Kong Chun and Eu Kong Tak. His business partner was Chiu Tong Hin and his attorney was Grant Mackie of the Straits Trading Company.

In 1881, when Eu was still only four, he was sent back to his mother in Foshan, China to study. However, with the sudden death of his father, he found himself, at only 13, heir to the family estates and tin mining businesses. He returned to Malaya in 1892 but his stay with his two uncles and his stepmother was short. He moved to the home of R. Butler and lived there for two and a half years, taking private tuition in English from F. W. Harley. From there he moved to Ipoh and enrolled in a government school. Later he would move to Singapore where he lived for some time before moving to Hong Kong when business conditions changed.

== Career ==
In 1898, at the age of 21, Eu took over his father's estate from Grant Mackie and discovered the business to be in decline. Over the next ten years he expanded the family business and multiply his fortune many times over. He expanded his business empire in Singapore, Malaya and Hong Kong and, at 30, was one of the richest men in the region.

In Malaya and the Straits, when tax farming was abolished and tin prices started to fall, Eu ventured into rubber plantations in British Malaya and remittances between Malaya and Hong Kong.

=== Tin business ===
At its peak, Eu's businesses owned a total of 11 mines and employed 12,000 miners. The tin business, however, was in a state of decline by the time he took over management. By 1908 he owned two mines at Kampar, three at Gopeng, one at Teronoh, one at Chenderiang, and one at Papan, together employing about 8,000 coolies. In Selangor he owned one mine at Ampang and one at Kancheng, together employing 3,000 coolies. In Batang Benna, Negeri Sembilan, he owned one mine employing 1,000 coolies.

He set up the Sang Woh Foundry and extended his business into the manufacture and export of tin-made items which he shipped to China and Southeast Asian countries.

=== Rubber business ===
In 1908, Eu commenced planting two estates of 450 and 250 acres (1.0 km^{2}) and eventually grew his father's business from their original two estates of 450 and 550 acres (2.2 km^{2}) until his rubber estates covered more than 283 hectares of land. In the 1920s when the rubber business in Malaya deteriorated, Eu shifted his focus to the remittance business in Hong Kong.

=== Eu Yan Sang ===
Aside from his involvement in the tin mining and rubber industries, Eu was also responsible for extending his family business of the traditional Chinese medicine manufacturing company, Eu Yan Sang, into Hong Kong; he felt it was necessary to diversify out of the tin industry, which was coming under increasing government regulation. He transformed the business his father left him, originating from that single dispensary in Gopeng, into a chain of traditional medicine shops. In 1908 his medicine shops in Kampar and Gopeng were flourishing.

Eu Yan Sang shops in Gopeng and Kampar extended to providing remittance services, allowing Chinese miners and plantation workers to send their earnings home. As the remittance and medicines businesses expanded, branches were set up in Penang, Ipoh, Kuala Lumpur, Hong Kong and Singapore. In 1909, Eu established a branch in the Sheung Wan district of Hong Kong. As his branches increased and his business spread out geographically, his potential market grew accordingly.

In 1914, he expanded the remittance business to reach throughout Malaya as well as the Dutch East Indies, Hong Kong, and southern China. In the 1920s when the rubber business in Malaya deteriorated, Eu shifted his focus to the remittance business in Hong Kong.

=== Eu Tong Sen Limited ===
By the late 1920s, the most profitable part of the Eu Yan Sang medicine shop business was in remittances and not medicines. Eu moved from Singapore to Hong Kong in 1928. On 7 January 1932, he formed Eu Tong Sen Limited in Singapore but controlled it from Hong Kong where his remittance business was showing the best potential.

=== Banking ===
In 1920, at 42, Eu, together with Wu Sing Pang, a rich Cantonese merchant in Singapore, founded the Lee Wah Bank with business operations in Guangdong, Singapore and Malaya. The bank was a "Cantonese" bank as opposed to Hokkien banks like the Ho Hong Bank etc., meaning it was set up to cater mainly to the Cantonese (or Cantonese-speaking) community.

=== Other Commercial Interests ===
His other commercial interests included shareholding in opium farms in Singapore and Penang.

== Political career ==
Eu purchased an official title from the Qing Dynasty government in 1903. He sold it back in 1906.

In May 1912, Eu was appointed a permanent Unofficial Member of the Federal Council of the Federated Malay States, the seat having fallen vacant on the death of Leong Fee.

== Philanthropy ==
Eu donated HK$55,000 to the University of Hong Kong during one of his visits there in 1918.

== Personal life ==
Eu had a large family, with eleven wives and 24 children.

Outside of his businesses, Eu was an early admirer of the Shaw brothers (Run Run Shaw and Runme Shaw) and invited them to Singapore as his guests. He also organised and oversaw the 1928 construction on that same street of the Majestic Theatre, a performing hall for Cantonese opera, and for forming an opera troupe to perform there, all to entertain one of his wives who was a fan of Cantonese opera. Later, he would become the first non-European commoner to be admitted to the Royal Ipoh Club.

Eu and Chung Thye Phin, the Kapitan China of Perak, were "blood" brothers. They went through a Chinese ceremony to become oath brothers. When Chung travelled to Hong Kong, he stayed in Eu's villa there and they kept an account of his expenses in the company's account books. Eu and Chung had common interests in motorcars, racehorses, country houses, etc. In 1903 when the Ipoh Gymkhana Club was founded, both of them decided to enter their thoroughbreds regularly in the Ipoh races. They jointly built a weekend retreat, "Forest Lodge", at Gopeng Road with a large stable. When Eu was appointed to the Federal Council, Chung sold his half-lot to Eu, who desired grander accommodations following the latter's elevation in status. In 1908, together with Chung, Eu built a large Chinese theatre in the important mining town of Kampar near Ipoh. Chung's Penang firms served as the agent for Eu in Penang before Eu opened a branch on the island. Eu's Penang branch, at least according to business directories, was the latest in his branch office network. Eu and Chung were also members of the board of directors of the Eastern Smelting Company, Ltd.

Eu took a keen interest in horse-racing, motoring and rifle-shooting. He imported the first motor car into Perak. Eu was also the pioneer of Singapore to bring in calf racing. Calf racing evolves around two men and two calves. Then, they will ride the calf through a series of obstacles before finally falling into a pool of water. The men then will have to finally swim to land and run back to the starting point, the first becoming the winner.

Eu's villa in Hong Kong was called "Eucliff". It has been torn down. It was built at Repulse Bay, overlooking the sea. The property was huge. It was built with stone like a castle. It included within its walled area a tennis court and also a swimming pool. Eucliff villa contained a statuary collection of Eu Tong Sen. When Eucliff was demolished, a statue of an anonymous World War I soldier was donated to Osborn Barracks in Kowloon where it stayed for 20 years before being relocated to Hong Kong Park.

== Death ==
Eu died of a heart attack on 11 May 1941 in Hong Kong at the age of 63. However, before that fatal heart attack, Eu survived multiples heart attacks and suffered a 5-day collapse a few times. He also had lung cancer but was cured.

== Legacy ==
In 1919, Singapore's Wayang Street was renamed to Eu Tong Sen Street in his honour. The honour was given in recognition of his contributions of a scout fighter plane called No. 1 Eu Tong Sen, and 6,000 pounds for a tank that had two "eyes" to further the British efforts in World War I. Mr. Addison, the Minister of Munitions commissioned a painting of the tank and presented the painting to Eu.

A description of Eu's residences in Perak, written by Herman Norden in 1923, goes as follows:

"Eu Tong Sen is a notable with his twenty-five millions of gold dollars. He has two palaces in Ipoh; one more in Kampar, and a castle with a garden and lake in Singapore. Art treasures selected in Europe by himself fill these various residences of the great Chinese tin magnate; the marble for his houses was brought from Italy."
