= British Forces Overseas Hong Kong =

British colonial garrison

- Flag of Hong Kong (1959-1997)
- Active: 26 January 1841; 185 years ago–30 June 1997; 29 years ago
- Country: British Hong Kong
- Allegiance: Monarch
- Branch: Royal Navy; British Army; Royal Air Force
- Type: Cavalry; Infantry; Artillery
- Role: Territorial Defence
- Size: One Garrison (during the Second World War); One Brigade (after 1945)
- Garrison/HQ: Garrison – All installments HQ – Flagstaff House (Residence of the CBF)
- Anniversaries: Liberation Day
- Equipment: Artillery; Vessels; Helicopter
- Engagements: Pacific War; Battle of Hong Kong

Commanders
- Commander-in-chief: Governor of Hong Kong
- Commanding Officer: Commander British Forces in Hong Kong (CBF)
- Inaugural holder of CBF: Major General George D'Aguilar
- Final holder of CBF: Major General Bryan Dutton
- Notable commanders: Major General Christopher Maltby; Brigadier John Lawson

British Forces Overseas Hong Kong
- Traditional Chinese: 駐港英軍
- Simplified Chinese: 驻港英军
Transcriptions
Standard Mandarin
- Hanyu Pinyin: Zhùgǎng Yīngjūn
Yue: Cantonese
- Jyutping: zyu3 gong2 jing1 gwan1

The British Forces Overseas Hong Kong comprised the elements of the British Army, Royal Navy (including Royal Marines) and Royal Air Force stationed in British Hong Kong. The Governor of Hong Kong also assumed the position of the commander-in-chief of the forces and the Commander British Forces in Hong Kong took charge of the daily deployment of the troops. Much of the British military left prior to the handover of Hong Kong to China in 1997. The present article focuses mainly on the British garrison in Hong Kong in the post Second World War era. For more information concerning the British garrison during the Second World War and earlier, see the Battle of Hong Kong.

== Overview ==
Prior to and during the Second World War, the garrison was composed of British Army battalions and locally enlisted personnel (LEPs) who served as regular members in the Hong Kong Squadron of the Royal Navy or the Hong Kong Military Service Corps and their associate land units. The Hong Kong Infantry Brigade served as the main garrison formation. After the outbreak of the Second World War, the garrison was reinforced with British Indian Army and Canadian Army units. A second brigade, the Kowloon Infantry Brigade, was formed to assist in commanding the expanded force. The garrison was defeated during the Battle of Hong Kong, by the Empire of Japan.

After the Second World War and the end of the Japanese occupation of Hong Kong, the British military reestablished a presence. As a result of the Chinese Civil War, the British Army raised the 40th Infantry Division and dispatched it to garrison Hong Kong. It later left for combat in the Korean War, and the defense of the territory was taken up by additional British forces who were rotated from Europe. The garrison was further supplemented by LEPs, and Gurkhas. The latter came from Nepal, but formed part of the British Army. The size of the garrison during the Cold War fluctuated and ended up being based around one brigade.

The Royal Hong Kong Regiment (RHKR) was a locally raised Crown regiment established under the Royal Hong Kong Regiment Ordinance (Cap. 199). It was administered by the Government of Hong Kong on behalf of the Sovereign, with its funding drawn from Crown revenues rather than from a local militia budget. The regiment assisted in the defence of Hong Kong, maintaining internal security and providing disaster relief when required.

Formed in 1854 and granted the “Royal” title in 1951, the regiment established an affiliation with the Royal Armoured Corps in the early 1960s and was formally incorporated into its order of battle under subsidiary regulations (L.N. 190 of 1970). It was placed under the operational command of the Commander British Forces Hong Kong. Officers were commissioned by the Governor, in the name of the Sovereign, and all members were subject to the Army Act 1955 and Queen’s Regulations. Several regular British Army officers were seconded to key positions to support training and command, and the regiment's organisation followed the model of the United Kingdom's Territorial Army. Although funded and administered locally, the regiment was legally part of the British Crown Forces and not a colonial militia. It was disbanded in 1995 prior to the transfer of sovereignty in 1997.

== Responsibilities ==
Before 1 July 1997, the British government had the political commitment to safeguard the territory against external and internal threats. Commonwealth forces were also deployed to station in the territory shortly before the Second World War. The greatest test was in 1941, when Japanese forces invaded Hong Kong, leading to the 44-month-long Japanese occupation of Hong Kong.

Internal security was the responsibility of the Hong Kong Government, in particular the Royal Hong Kong Police. It was supported by British Forces in Hong Kong should it be called upon to do so. During the Hong Kong 1967 riots, in which 51 people were killed, the British garrison supported the Royal Hong Kong Police in quelling the disturbance. Until 1995, the safety of much of the Sino-Hong Kong border was the responsibility of the British forces and as such contributed greatly to the interdiction of illegal immigrants (II). As the preparation of the handover of Hong Kong to China in 1997, that responsibility was passed on to the Hong Kong Police.

The Royal Navy played a significant role in the support of the Royal Hong Kong Police in anti smuggling operation in Hong Kong waters, especially in the heyday of seaborne smuggling during the mid-1980s to mid-1990s.

Search and Rescue (SAR) was provided by all branches of the British Forces in Hong Kong may be called upon for aid to civil defence as well as search and rescue operations in times of emergency.

Prior to 1990–1991, British Forces (British Army) was responsible for patrolling and enforcing border control between Hong Kong and China. This role was passed on the Hong Kong Police Force years before the handover in 1997. Some HK nationals who served in the British military were deployed overseas, including Operation Granby.

The territory has nevertheless maintained a Government Flying Service, formerly the Royal Hong Kong Auxiliary Air Force, that is responsible for search and rescue operations, air ambulance services, and other air services for the Hong Kong Government. The GFS also took over some responsibilities from the Royal Air Force and the Army Air Corps. The Hong Kong Police Force also has a highly trained and equipped counter terrorism unit, the Special Duties Unit, trained by United Kingdom's SAS and SBS, and a Marine Police force. These forces have been heavily armed since before the handover in 1997, and are within the portfolio of the Secretary for Security (which, before 1973, was named Secretary for Defence).

The Fire Service Department also took over some diving rescue responsibilities from the British Forces Overseas.

== Command structure ==
The Governor of Hong Kong, being a representative of the British sovereign, was the Commander-in-Chief of the British Forces in the colony. The Governor was advised by the Commander British Forces in Hong Kong (CBF) on all military actions. During the 1980s and 1990s, the CBF was normally a career Major General or Lieutenant General from the British Army. Until 1966, the CBF was an ex-officio member of the Legislative Council.

Throughout the years of British rule in Hong Kong, a variety of British Army units spent various periods of time in the colony as resident units. In latter stages of the post-war period, British army units were sent to Hong Kong on a rotational basis for a period of three years. The following list contains resident units only and those which stayed in Hong Kong for short durations for re-supply or acclimatisation during the Korean War, Opium War, Boxer Rebellion and the Malayan Emergency are not included in the list. The majority of infantry battalions were Ghurkas who were permanently based in Hong Kong after Indian partition.

=== British Army formations ===
Major formations of the British Army in Hong Kong included:

==== Second World War ====
- Headquarters, China Command (1939) – covered British military interests in: Hong Kong, Shanghai, and Tientsin.
  - Hong Kong Infantry Brigade (This was the primary British garrison in Hong Kong prior to and during the Second World War)
  - Kowloon Infantry Brigade (This brigade was formed in 1941 after the garrison was reinforced)
  - C Force – Canadian Army's reinforcement under British Command during the Battle of Hong Kong in 1941.

==== Cold War ====
- 40th Division (reformed in 1949, dispatched to Korea in 1950)
  - 26th Gurkha Infantry Brigade (1948–1950)
  - 27th Infantry Brigade (circa 1949)
  - 28th Infantry Brigade (arrived in Hong Kong in 1949)
- 51st Infantry Brigade (established circa 1950, disbanded 1976)
- 48th Gurkha Infantry Brigade (1957–1976; renamed Gurkha Field Force 1976–97; returned to old title 1987-ca.1992)

=== British Army units ===
==== Royal Armoured Corps ====
- C Squadron, The Royal Scots Greys (2 Dragoons), 19-09-1962–not known.
- 1st Royal Tank Regiment (1957–1960)(C Sqn 1974–1976)
- 3rd Royal Tank Regiment (1949–1950)
- 7th Royal Tank Regiment (1952–1954)
- 4th Hussars (1950)
- 7th Hussars (1954–1957)
- 16th/5th Lancers (A Sqn 1963–1964) (C Sqn 1973–1975)
- 14th/20th King's Hussars (1970–73)
- 17th/21st Lancers (Dec 1959–1960; C Sqn 1961–1962)
- B Squadron, Life Guards (1967)

==== Infantry ====
- 28th (North Gloucestershire) Regiment of Foot (circa late 1870s)
- 74th (Highland) Regiment of Foot (circa 1878)
- 1st Battalion, Royal Inniskilling Fusiliers (1881–1883; 1947–1948)
- 1st Battalion, King's Shropshire Light Infantry (1892–1894)
- 2nd Battalion, Queen's Own Cameron Highlanders (1908–09)
- 2nd Battalion, Duke of Cornwall's Light Infantry (1914)
- 2nd Battalion, Middlesex Regiment (1917–18)
- 1st Battalion, East Surrey Regiment (1923–26)
- 2nd Battalion, Scots Guards (1926–28)
- 2nd Battalion, King's Own Scottish Borderers (1926–1930)
- 1st Battalion, Queen's Royal Regiment (1927–1928)
- 1st Battalion, King's Own Scottish Borderers (1949–1951, May to August 1965)
- 1st Battalion, South Wales Borderers (1930–1934; 1963–1966)
- 1st Battalion, Royal Lincolnshire Regiment (1932–36)
- 1st Battalion, Seaforth Highlanders (1937–38)
- 1st Battalion, Middlesex Regiment (1937–1941; 1949–1950; 1951–1952)
- 1st Battalion, Buffs (Royal East Kent Regiment) (1948 Stanley Fort; 1949, New Territories); 1965, Gun Club Hill Barracks)
- 2nd Battalion, Royal Scots (The Royal Regiment) (1938–41)
- 1st Battalion, Devonshire Regiment (1947)
- 1st Battalion, King's Shropshire Light Infantry (1949–1951)
- 1st Battalion, Cameronians (Scottish Rifles) (1949–1950, Fan Ling)
- 1st Battalion, The Argyll and Sutherland Highlanders (Princess Louise's) (1949–50; 1951–52; 1979)
- 1st Battalion, Royal Leicestershire Regiment, (1949–1951, Norwegian Farm Camp)
- 1st Battalion, South Staffordshire Regiment, (1949–1951)
- 1st Battalion, Wiltshire Regiment (1950–52)
- 1st Battalion, Royal Northumberland Fusiliers (1951–1952; 1960–1962)
- 1st Battalion, Royal Ulster Rifles (1951–1954)
- 1st Battalion, Dorset Regiment (1952–1954)
- 1st Battalion, The Welch Regiment (1952–1954; 1966–1968)
- 1st Battalion, Royal Norfolk Regiment (1952–1953, Norwegian Farm Camp)
- 1st Battalion, King's Own Royal Regiment (Lancaster) (1954–1956, Beas Stable Camp)
- 1st Battalion, North Staffordshire Regiment (1954–1957)
- 1st Battalion, Essex Regiment (1954–1957, Dodswell Ridge Camp)
- 1st Battalion, The Northamptonshire Regiment (1954–1957)
- 1st Battalion, The Green Howards (1956–1959)
- 1st Battalion, East Lancashire Regiment (1957–1958, amalgamated with The South Lancashire Regiment in HK to form The Lancashire Regiment.)
- 1st Battalion, South Lancashire Regiment (1958, amalgamated with The East Lancashire Regiment in HK to form The Lancashire Regiment.)
- 1st Battalion, Lancashire Regiment (1958–1961, formed in HK in 1958 with the amalgamation of The South Lancashire Regiment and The East Lancashire Regiment.)
- 1st Battalion, Royal Warwickshire Regiment (1960–1962)
- 1st Battalion, Queen's Royal Surrey Regiment (1962–1964)
- 1st Battalion, Durham Light Infantry (1963–1965)
- 3rd Battalion, Green Jackets (The Rifle Brigade) (February to June 1965, 4 month acclimatisation before Jungle Warfare School training in Malaya.)
- 1st Battalion, Queen's Own Buffs, The Royal Kent Regiment (1965–1966, Gun Club Hill Barracks)
- 1st Battalion, Royal Hampshire Regiment (1966; 1974–1976)
- 2nd Battalion, Queen's Regiment (January to October, 1967, Gun Club Hill Barracks)
- 1st Battalion, Lancashire Fusiliers (1967–69)
- 1st Battalion, Duke of Wellington's Regiment (West Riding) (1968–70)
- 1st Battalion, Royal Welch Fusiliers (1969–1972)
- 1st Battalion, Irish Guards (1970–72)
- 2nd Battalion, Grenadier Guards (1975–1976, Stanley Fort)
- 1st Battalion, Light Infantry (1975–77)
- 1st Battalion, Royal Green Jackets (1977–80)
- 1st Battalion, Parachute Regiment (January to May 1980, 4 month emergency tour)
- 1st Battalion, Queen's Own Highlanders (Seaforth and Camerons) (1980–1981, Stanley Fort)
- 1st Battalion, Scots Guards (1981–1984, Stanley Fort)
- 1st Battalion, Cheshire Regiment (1984–1986, Stanley Fort)
- 1st Battalion, Coldstream Guards (1986–1988, Stanley Fort)
- 1st Battalion, Duke of Edinburgh's Royal Regiment (Berkshire & Wiltshire) (1988–1990, Stanley Fort)
- 1st Battalion, Royal Regiment of Wales (1990–1992, Stanley Fort)
- 1st Battalion, Black Watch (Royal Highland Regiment) (1972–74 Gun Club Hill Barracks and Erskine Camp; 1993–1994, Stanley Fort; 1997)
- 1st Battalion, Staffordshire Regiment (1996–1997, Stanley Fort)

==== Gurkhas ====
- 1st Battalion, 2nd King Edward VII's Own Gurkha Rifles (1971–75; 77–79; 81–85; 87–89; 91–92)
- 2nd Battalion, 2nd King Edward VII's Own Gurkha Rifles (1953–57; 57–62; 66–68; 72–75; 77–81; 83–85; 87–91)
- 1st Battalion, 6th Queen Elizabeth's Own Gurkha Rifles (1956–57; 65–73; 75–77; 79–83; 85–87; 89–93)
- 2nd Battalion, 6th Queen Elizabeth's Own Gurkha Rifles (1948–50; 62–63; 1969 amalgamated with the 1st Bn.)
- 1st Battalion, 7th Duke of Edinburgh's Own Gurkha Rifles (1959–62; 73–77; 83–87; 89–91; 93–94)
- 2nd Battalion, 7th Duke of Edinburgh's Own Gurkha Rifles (1954–57; 62–63; 62–70; disbanded in Hong Kong in 1987)
- 1st Battalion, 10th Princess Mary's Own Gurkha Rifles (1957–60; 69–73; 75–79; 81–83; 85–89; 91–93)
- 2nd Battalion, 10th Princess Mary's Own Gurkha Rifles (1948–50; 1962; amalgamated with 1st Bn. in 1968)
- 1st Battalion, The Royal Gurkha Rifles (1994–96)

==== British Indian Army ====
- 5th Battalion, 7th Rajput Regiment (1941–45)
- 2nd Battalion, 14th Punjab Regiment (1941–45)
- Indian Hospital Corps
- Indian Medical Service
- Royal Indian Army Service Corps
- Hong Kong Mule Corps, RIASC

==== Artillery ====
- Hong Kong and Singapore Royal Artillery (1847 to 1940s)
- 3rd Regiment Royal Horse Artillery (1973–1975; Borneo Lines, Sek Kong)
- 4th Field Regiment, RA (1961–1964; HQ & 29 Bty at Fan Ling Camp, 88 Bty & 97 Bty at Dodwells Ridge Camp)
- 8th Coast Regiment, Royal Artillery, Kowloon (1939 until captured by the Japanese in 1941)
- 5th Heavy Anti-Aircraft Regiment, RA, RAF Kai Tak (circa 1939)
- 5th Field Regiment, RA (1958–1961; at Fanling Camp & Dodwells Ridge Camp)
- 14th Field Regiment, RA (1949–1951 at Gun Club Hill Barracks & Sek Kong; 1953–1955 at Quarry Bay Camp; 1960–1962 at Sek Kong)
- 15th Observation Battery and 173rd Locating Battery 1950 at Lo Wu Camp
- 15th Medium Regiment, RA (1955–1957; 7 and 38 Med Btys at Gun Club Hill Barracks)
- 18th Medium Regiment, RA (1966–1969; 40 and 52 Lt Btys at Borneo Lines, Sek Kong. RHQ disbanded in Hong Kong and Regiment placed into Suspended Animation.)
- 19th Field Regiment, RA (1956–1958; 25, 28 and 67 Fd Btys at Quarry Bay Camp and Sek Kong Camps)
- 20th Anti-Tank Regiment, RA (1952; 1953–1955, with 12, 45 and 107 Fd Btys at Sek Kong Camp, 1975–1976; disbanded in HK in 1976)
- 23rd Field Regiment, RA (1949–1952; 49, 50 and 69 Fld Btys at Quarry Bay Camp)
- 25th Field Regiment, RA (1947–1955; 35, 54 and 93 Fld Btys at Gun Hill Club Barracks; 1969–1971 at Borneo Lines, Sek Kong)
- 27th Heavy Regiment, RA (1949–1957; Redesignated 27th HAA Regt RA in 1950; 119 Bty to 34th LAA Regt RA in 1952; at Clear Water Bay and Stonecutters Island.)
- 32nd Medium Regiment, RA (1952–1954,74 and 98 Med Btys at Gun Club Hill Barracks; 1959–1961, 46, 50 and 74 Med Btys at Whitfield Barracks & Gun Club Hill Barracks)
- 34th Light Anti-Aircraft Regiment, RA (1949–1952; 1961–1963, 11 and 58 LAA Btys at Gun Club Hill Barracks)
- 42nd Field Regiment, RA (1955–1956, with 68, 87 and 179 Fld Btys at Sek Kong Camp)
- 45th Field Regiment, RA (1951–1953 with 70, 116 and 176 Fld Btys; 1959–1961)
- 47th Coast Regiment, RA (1971–1973 with 3, 4 Lt and 31 Med Btys at Borneo Lines, Sek Kong)
- 49th Anti-Tank Regiment, RA (1957–1961, with 55, 127 and 143 Fld Btys at Borneo Lines, Sek Kong; 1964–1966, with 143 Bty at Dodwells Ridge Camp)
- 58th Medium Regiment, RA (1949–1951; with 118 and 175 Med Btys at Gun Club Hill Barracks)
- 72nd Light Anti-Air Regiment, RA (1952–1955, with 31, 206 and 216 LAA Btys at Gun Club Hill Barracks)
- 74th Light Anti-Air Regiment, RA (1955–1958, with 158 and 161 LAA Btys at Whitfield Camp)

==== Engineers ====
Royal Engineers and Queen's Gurkha Engineers

- 1 Field Squadron,
- 22nd Fortress Company, Royal Engineers (circa 1939)
- 40th Fortress Company, Royal Engineers (circa 1939)
- 24 Field Engineer Regiment, Royal Engineers
  - 11 Field Squadron, RE (1950–1951, Sek Kong, formed by renumbering 50 Fd Sqn 24 Field Engineer Regiment)
  - 15 Field Park Squadron, RE (1950–1958, formed by renumbering 46 Fd Park Sqn)
  - 50 Field Squadron, RE (1949–1950, formed by renumbering 11 Field Squadron)
  - 54 Independent Field Squadron, RE (1950-circa 1958, formed by renumbering 25 Fd Sqn)
  - 54 (Hong Kong) Support Squadron, RE (1971 until disbandment in 1975)
  - 56 Field Squadron, RE (1950–1958, formed by numbering 37 Field Squadron)
- Royal Engineers Postal and Courier Service (British Forces Post Box 1)
- Queen's Gurkha Engineers (formed in HK in 1952 as 50th Regiment RE, renamed QGE in 1977)
  - 67 Squadron, QGE(disbanded in 1996)
  - 68 Squadron, QGE (disbanded in 1993)
  - 69 Squadron, QGE (disbanded in HK in 1968 and reformed as 69 Gurkha Independent Field Squadron in Chatham)
  - 70 Squadron, QGE (disbanded in 1993)
  - Gurkha Training Squadron (disbanded in 1971)

==== Signals ====
Royal Signals and Queen's Gurkha Signals

- 27th Signal Regiment, Royal Signals (embarked for Hong Kong in 1949 as the 40th Divisional Signal Regiment)
  - Amalgamated with Hong Kong Signal Squadron to form Hong Kong Signal Regiment (1950)
  - Redesignated 27th Signal Regiment (1959)
  - Renamed HQ Royal Signals, Hong Kong (1960)
  - Renamed 27th Signal Regiment (1971, disbanded in 1976))
- Hong Kong Independent Lines Squadron, Royal Signals (circa 1958)
- Independent Gurkha Brigade Squadron (circa 1958)
- Gurkha Infantry Brigade Signal Squadron (circa 1959)
- Detachments, 19th Air Formation Signal Troop, Royal Signals (circa 1959)
- Detachments, 232 Squadron, Royal Signals (circa 1959)
- HQ Royal Signals, Hong Kong (1960–1967)
  - 252 Signal Squadron on the Hong Kong Island
  - 253 Signal Squadron in Kowloon, repurposed as an engineering squadron in 1962
- Joint Services Signal Staff (1967–1997)
- 17th Gurkha Signal Regiment
- Queen's Gurkha Signals
  - 247 Squadron, QGS (1964–1967 until disbandment in HK, reformed in HK 1983)
  - 248 Squadron, QGS (1971–1976 until disbandment; reformed in 1971)
  - Hong Kong Gurkha Signal Squadron (formed in 1994 with the amalgamation of 247 & 248 Sqns, disbanded in 1997.)

==== Support units ====
- Army Catering Corps
- Army Fire Service
- Army Legal Corps / Army Legal Services Branch
- Army Air Corps
  - 20 Flight, AAC (Shatin and Sek Kong, 1960s)
  - No. 660 Squadron AAC, Shek Kong (1978–94)
- Army Physical Training Corps
- British Army Aid Group
- Government House Guard (C Company)
- Gurkha Transport Regiment
  - 28 & 31 Squadrons
- Hong Kong Military Service Corps (1962–1996)
  - Hong Kong Chinese Regiment (1941–1948)
  - Hong Kong Chinese Training Unit (1948–1962)
  - Hong Kong Information Team – an internal-security, anti-smuggling and anti-illegal immigration intelligence unit under the Hong Kong Military Service Corps with Locally Enlisted Personnel (LEPS) of Chinese descent drawn from a number of British Army units.
- General List / General Service Corps
- Intelligence Corps
- Queen Alexandra's Royal Army Nursing Corps
- Royal Army Chaplains' Department
- Royal Army Dental Corps
- Royal Army Education Corps
  - 75 Army Education Centre, 28 Army Education Centre, Victoria Army Education Centre
- Royal Army Ordnance Corps
  - 6th Company, Royal Army Ordnance Corps (circa 1939)
  - Sham Shui Po Ordnance Depot (est. 1946)
  - 6 Forward Ordnance Depot, Kowloon Tong (1950; Renamed 6 Command Ordnance Depot in 1952 by combining 6 FOD and the Ammo Depot)
  - Ordnance Depot Hong Kong (1960)
  - Kai Tak Depot (est. 1966)
  - Composite Ordnance Depot (est. 1966)
- Royal Army Medical Corps / British Military Hospital, Hong Kong
  - 27 Hong Kong Company, Royal Army Medical Corps (circa 1939)
  - BMH Bowen Road (1907–1967)
  - BMH Hong Kong (Kowloon) (1967–1996)
  - 18 Field Ambulance (circa 1950s to 1972)
- Royal Army Pay Corps
- Royal Army Service Corps
  - 10 Company, RASC (circa 1939)
  - 781 Company (Civil Affairs/GT), RASC (1945 until disbandment in 1946)
  - 799 Company (AD), RASC (circa 1945)
  - 3 Supply & Petroleum Depot, Argyle Street, Kowloon (1950s)
  - 56 (Hong Kong) Company, RASC (1953-circa 1960s at Causeway Bay Camp; absorbed by 79th Company, RASC in early 1960s)
  - 79 Company (Water Transport), RASC (circa 1946–1959; circa 1962; absorbed by 56th Company in early 1960s)
  - 12 Hong Kong Company, RASC
- Royal Army Veterinary Corps
  - Defence Animal Support Unit
- Royal Corps of Transport and Gurkha Transport Regiment / Queen's Own Gurkha Transport Regiment
  - Detachment, 71 Movement Control Squadron, RCT (circa 1965)
  - 31 Regiment, RCT (1968 until disbandment in 1976)
    - 29 Squadron, RCT (1965 until disbandment in 1993; Reduced to 414 Pack Transport Troop in 1968, reformed as a GT Sqn from the old island detachment of 56 Squadron the same year.)
    - 414 Pack Transport Troop, 29 Squadron, RCT (1968–1976; Lo Wu Camp)
    - 56 Squadron, RCT (disbanded in 1976, personnel absorbed by 29 Sqn RCT)
    - 415 Maritime Troop (est. 1970s, came under command Gurkha Transport Regiment in 1976)
  - 28 Squadron, Gurkha Transport Regiment (from 28 Company (MT) (Gurkha) RASC; 1965–1993)
  - 31 Squadron, Gurkha Transport Regiment (relocated from Singapore to Hong Kong in 1971, disbanded in 1993))
- Royal Electrical and Mechanical Engineers
  - 11 Infantry Workshop, REME (under 27 Infantry Brigade, circa 1949–1950 at Sek Kong)
  - 16 Infantry Workshop (circa 1950 at Sek Kong)
  - 17 Infantry Workshop (circa 1960s)
  - 50 Command Workshop, (1960s–1994, at Sham Shui Po and Sek Kong)
  - Light Aid Detachments to various Royal Artillery and Royal Armoured Corps units
- Royal Hong Kong Regiment
  - Hong Kong Volunteers (1854–1878)
  - Hong Kong Artillery and Rifle Volunteer Corps (1978–1917)
  - Hong Kong Defence Corps (1917–1941)
  - Hong Kong Volunteer Defence Corps (1941–1949)
  - Hong Kong Defence Force (1949–1951) (included air and naval units)
  - Royal Hong Kong Defence Force (1951–1961)
  - Hong Kong Regiment (1961–1970) (repurposed from infantry to reconnaissance)
  - Royal Hong Kong Regiment (Volunteers) (1970–1995)
- Royal Logistic Corps
  - Hong Kong Postal & Courier Squadron, RLC (1993 until disbandment)
  - Hong Kong Logistic Support Regiment RLC
- Royal Military Police
  - 40th Infantry Division Provost Company
  - Hong Kong Provost Company, RMP
- Women's Royal Army Corps

==== Installations ====
A list of British Army installations in Hong Kong:

- Bonham Tower Barracks
- Burma Lines – Queen's Hill Camp
- Cassino Lines – likely named for Battle of Monte Cassino from the Second World War
- Central Ordnance Munitions Depot
- Flagstaff House 1978 – former British Forces HQ and known as Headquarters House 1846–1932 and built for Major General George Charles D'Aguilar; now known as Museum of Teaware.
- Gallipoli Lines – Sha Tau Kok Road in Fanling, formerly San Wai Camp; San Wai/Tai Ling Range.
- Gin Drinkers Line 1930s
- Gun Club Hill Barracks – now PLA barracks
- Lo Wu Camp (now the Lo Wu Correctional Institution)
- Kohima Camp (Tai Po Tsai) – became the site of The Hong Kong University of Science and Technology
- Lo Wu Observation Post, Sha Tau Kok Observation Post, Sandy Ridge Observation Post and Tai O Observation Post.
- Lyemun Barracks or Lei Yue Mun Barracks 1840s – coast defence and now Museum of Coastal Defence and Lei Yue Mun Park and Holiday Village
- Murray Battery
- (Queen) Victoria Barracks 1846–1979 – parade grounds now site of Pacific Place, JW Marriott Hotel, Shangri-La Hotel and Hong Kong Park; the Barracks was converted to The Visual Arts Centre (Hong Kong Museum of Art). Victoria Barracks consisted of:
  - The Former Explosives Magazine complex, which is now part of the Asia Society Hong Kong Center.
  - Cassels Block – Originally named Block C, the former barracks for married British officers. The building is now the Hong Kong Visual Arts Centre. Likely named after Sir Robert Cassels, British Indian Army officer and Viceroy of India.
  - Rawlinson House – the former residence of the Deputy Commander of British Forces in Hong Kong. Now a marriage registry. Two Warrant Officers' Married Quarters were integrated with it into a single building in the 1960s.
  - Wavell House – former quarters for married British officers, converted in 1991 into the aviary support centre (Education Centre).
  - Montgomery Block – currently home to Mother's Choice Limited.
  - Roberts Block – now the Jockey Club New Life Hostel of the New Life Psychiatric Rehabilitation Association.
  - Alexander Block – Demolished.
  - Birdwood Block – married officers' quarters, Demolished.
  - Colvin Block – used by the Women's Royal Army Corps, now the site of the British Council and British Consulate-General complex.
  - Freyberg Block – was HQ Intelligence Services. Demolished.
  - Gort Block – living quarters. Demolished.
  - Hamilton Block – returned to the Hong Kong Government in 1967. Demolished.
  - Kitchener Block – accommodation for school teachers. Demolished.
  - Queen's Line – now Ching Yi To Barracks of the People's Liberation Army.
- North Barracks 1840s–1887 – to the RN 1887–1959 and Hong Kong Government 1959–
- Murray Barracks 1846–1982 – named for British Army Major-General Sir George Murray; the officers' quarters was moved from Central to Stanley, now known as Murray House
- Osborn Barracks (Kowloon) 1945 – named for Winnipeg Grenadiers Company Sergeant Major John Robert Osborn VC of Canada who died in defending Hong Kong in 1941.
- Perowne Barracks (Tuen Mun) – established in 1931 as the Tai Lam Camp. Named for British Army Major General Lancelot Perowne and once used by Tuen Mun Immigration Service Training School, now used by Crossroads International
- Sek Kong Barracks
  - Headquarters 48 Gurkha Infantry Brigade
  - Training Depot Brigade of Gurkhas (TDBG)
  - Borneo Lines
  - Malaya Lines
  - British Forces Broadcasting Service
  - Services Sound and Vision Corporation
- Sham Shui Po Barracks – has been WWII Japanese War Prison, Vietnamese Refugee Camp and now housing estates, commercial centre and government offices.
- Saiwan Barracks 1844 – used for a short duration and abandoned for Lyemun Barracks.
- Sai Wan War Cemetery
- Stanley Military Cemetery
- Stanley Fort (Hong Kong Island) 1841 – later served as Stanley Prison and WWII Japanese War Prison.
- Wellington Barracks 1840s–1946 – to the RN as HMS Tamar 1946–1960s (demolished and replaced with HMS Tamar/Prince of Wales Building, now the Chinese People's Liberation Army Forces Hong Kong Building)
- Navy, Army and Air Force Institutes

=== Royal Navy / Royal Marines ===
The Royal Navy and Royal Marines was stationed in Hong Kong right from the beginning of the establishment of Hong Kong as a British Colony. For the most part, the Royal Naval base was located in Hong Kong Island at HMS Tamar. The Prince of Wales Building was added later in the 1970s. Before the handover, the naval base was moved to Stonecutters Island next to the Government docks.

RN and RFA ships visited or posted to Hong Kong prior to the Second World War:

- HMS Sulphur (1841)
- HMS Minden (circa 1841)
- HMS Hercules (circa 1847)
- HMS Princess Charlotte (circa 1858)
- HMS Ocean (circa 1871)
- HMS Victor Emmanuel (circa 1873)
- HMS Tamar (circa 1897)
- HMS Astraea (circa 1901)
- HMS Barfleur (circa 1901)
- HMS Britomart (circa 1901)
- HMS Centurion (circa 1901)
- HMS Dido (circa 1901)
- HMS Endymion (circa 1901)
- HMS Glory (circa 1901)
- HMS Humber (circa 1901)
- HMS Otter (circa 1901)
- HMS Terrible (circa 1901)
- HMS Undaunted (circa 1901)
- HMS Waterwitch (circa 1901)
- HMS Sandpiper (circa 1901)
- HMS Leviathan (1904)
- HMS Sutlej (1905)
- HMS Diadem (1906)
- HMS Taku (circa 1901; sold in Hong Kong in 1916)
- HMS Thistle (circa 1914)
- HMS Triumph (circa 1914)
- HMS Titania (1920–26)
- RFA Maine (1927)
- HMS Tenedos (circa 1939) (transferred to Singapore before the Battle of Hong Kong)

RN ships and land units in Hong Kong during the Second World War:

- HMS Aldgate
- HMS Barlight
- HMS Cicala
- HMS Cornflower
- HMS Moth
- HMS Redstart
- HMS Robin
- HMS Scout
- HMS Tern
- HMS Thanet
- HMS Thracian
- HMS Watergate
- Royal Naval Dockyard Police
- Hong Kong Dockyard Defence Corps

Auxiliary Patrol Vessels in Hong Kong during the Second World War:

- APV Britannia
- APV Chun Hsing
- APV Frosty
- APV Han Wo
- APV Ho Hsing
- APV Henriette
- APV Indira
- APV Margaret
- APV Minnie
- APV Perla
- APV Poseidon
- APV Shun Wo
- HMS St Aubin
- HMS St Sampson
- APV Stanley
- APV Teh Hsing

RN formations and units in Hong Kong (Post-Second World War):

- China Squadron 1844–1941, 1945–1992
- 3rd Frigate Squadron (1949 to 1963; 1972 to 1980)
- Far East Fleet / Hong Kong Squadron 1969–1971
- Dragon Squadron 1971–1992
- Hong Kong Royal Naval Volunteer Reserves 1967–1996 – merge with RNR 1971
- Side Girls Party 1933–1997
- 120th Minesweeping Squadron 1958–1966 – transfer to Singapore
- 6th Mine Countermeasure Squadron 1969–1997
- 6th Patrol Craft Squadron 1970–1997
- Operations and Training Base 1934–1997
- British Pacific Fleet 1840s–1948 – to Singapore as Far East Station
- Hong Kong Flotilla 1840s–1941, 1948–1992
- China Station – 4th Submarine Flotilla, Yangtse Flotilla, West River Flotilla, 8th Destroyer Flotilla
- 5th Cruiser Squadron
- 1st Escort Flotilla
- 4th Frigate Flotilla ?-1952
- Frigate Squadron 1952–1976
- Light Cruiser Squadron

RN and RFA ships visited or posted to Hong Kong after the Second World War:

- HMS Challenger (1945)
- HMS Amethyst (1948)
- HMS Cardigan Bay (circa 1951)
- HMS Dampier (1952)
- HMS Comus (circa 1954)
- RFA Olna (1961; 1963)
- HMS Lanton (circa 1963)
- HMS Loch Killisport (circa 1963)
- HMS Penston (circa 1963)
- HMS Centaur (1964)
- HMS Blake (circa 1974)
- HMS Chichester (circa 1973–1976)
- HMS Boxer (circa 1980)
- HMS Invincible (1992)
- HMS Newcastle (1992)
- HMS Beaver (1997)
- HMY Britannia (1986; 1990; 1997)
- HMS Chatham (1997)

Royal Marines:

- 40 Commando, 3 Commando Brigade, RM (1946–47; 1949; 1962)
- 42 Commando, 3 Commando Brigade, RM (1945; 1949)
- 44 Commando, 3 Commando Brigade, RM (1945–1947; redesignated 40 Commando in 1947)
- 45 Commando, 3 Commando Brigade, RM (1946–1947; 1949–1950)
- No. 3 Raiding Squadron, RM (1978–1988)
- 47 Royal Marines

A list of naval facilities used or built by the RN in Hong Kong:

- Stonecutters Island
  - Royal Navy Radio Interception and Direction-finding Station (est. 1935)
  - HQ 415 Maritime Troop, Royal Corps of Transport
- Prince of Wales Building 1978–1997 – known as Central Barracks of the PLA
- Lamont and Hope Drydocks
- Aberdeen Docks – destroyed
- Dry Dock 1902–1959
- Taikoo Dockyard – Hong Kong United Dockyards
- Royal Navy Dockyards, Admiralty 1859–1902
- Royal Navy Dockyards 1902–1959 – Kowloon Dockyard not part of Hung Hom area.
- RN Coal storage yard, Stonecutters Island 1861–1959
- RN Coal storage yard and Kowloon Naval Dockyards 1901–1959
- Sai Wan Barracks 1844–1846
- Wellington Barracks 1946–1978 – as HMS Tamar (demolished)
- North Barracks 1850s–1856, 1887–1959 – from the Army and to HK Government 1959
- Victoria Barracks
- Redoubt and Lei Yue Mun Fortifications 1885–1887
- Lei Yue Mun Fort 1887–1987
- Reverse, Central, West and Pass Batteries 1880s
- Brennan Torpedo station 1890 – Lei Yue Mun
- Royal Naval Hospital, Wan Chai – demolished, now replaced by Ruttonjee Hospital
- Seaman's Hospital 1843–1873 – replaced by Royal Naval Hospital
- RMS Queen Mary 1945–1946 – as a hospital ship
- War Memorial Hospital (Matilda) 1946–1959
- British Military Hospital 1959–1995
- Island Group Practice 1995–1997 – replace BMH
- HMS Princess Charlotte and HMS Victor Emmanuel – Receiving Ships
- Tidal Basin 1902–1959
- Boat Basin 1902–1959
- HM Victualling Yards 1859–1946

A list of facilities used or built by the RN in Hong Kong:

- Lamont and Hope Drydocks
- Aberdeen Docks
- Royal Naval Hospital, Wan Chai – now Ruttonjee Sanatorium
- Seaman's Hospital 1843–1873 – replaced by Royal Naval Hospital
- HMS Princess Charlotte and HMS Victor Emmanuel – Receiving Ships
- HMS Tamar – Receiving ship 1897–1941
- HMS Nabcatcher – Kai Tak 1945–1946
- HMS Flycatcher – Kai Tak 1947
- HMS Minden 1841-mid-1840s – hospital ship
- HMS Alligator 1840s–1865 – hospital ship
- HMS Melville 1860s–1873 – hospital ship (East Indies Sqdn)

=== Royal Air Force ===
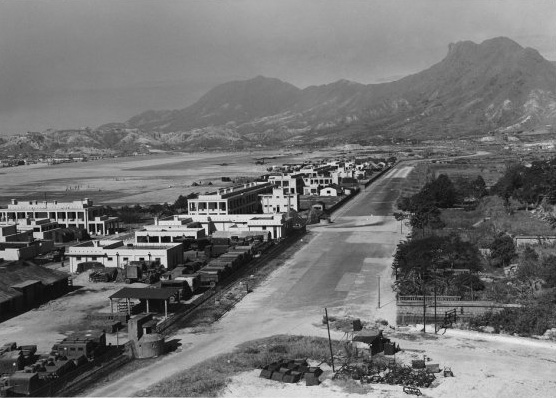
Base of RAF in Kai Tak (1945)

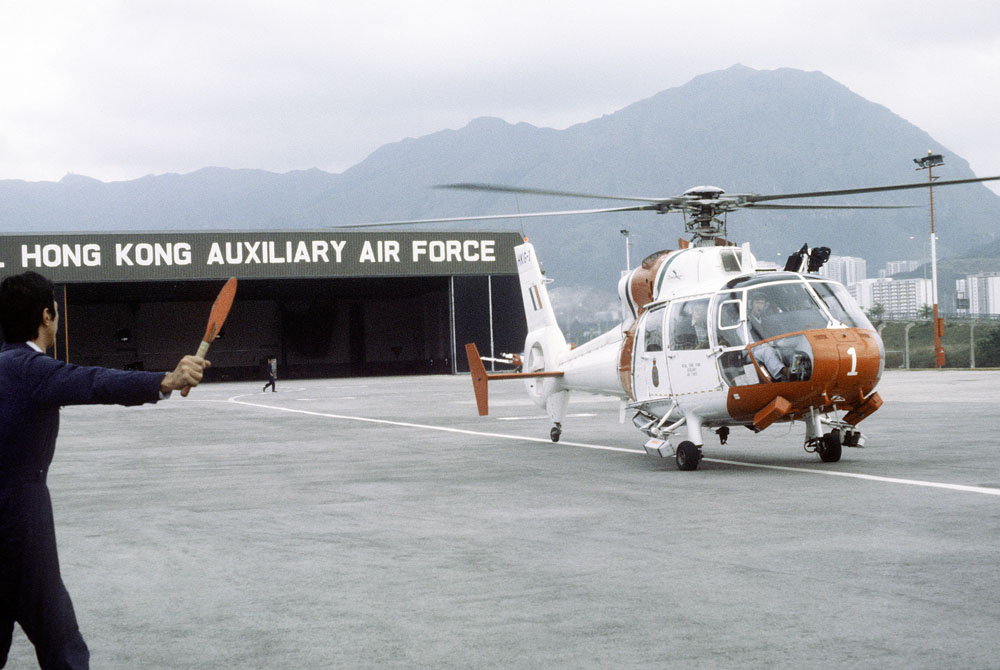
A Royal Hong Kong Auxiliary Air Force Aerospatiale Dauphin helicopter leaving its hangar during a Search and Rescue exercise in 1982.

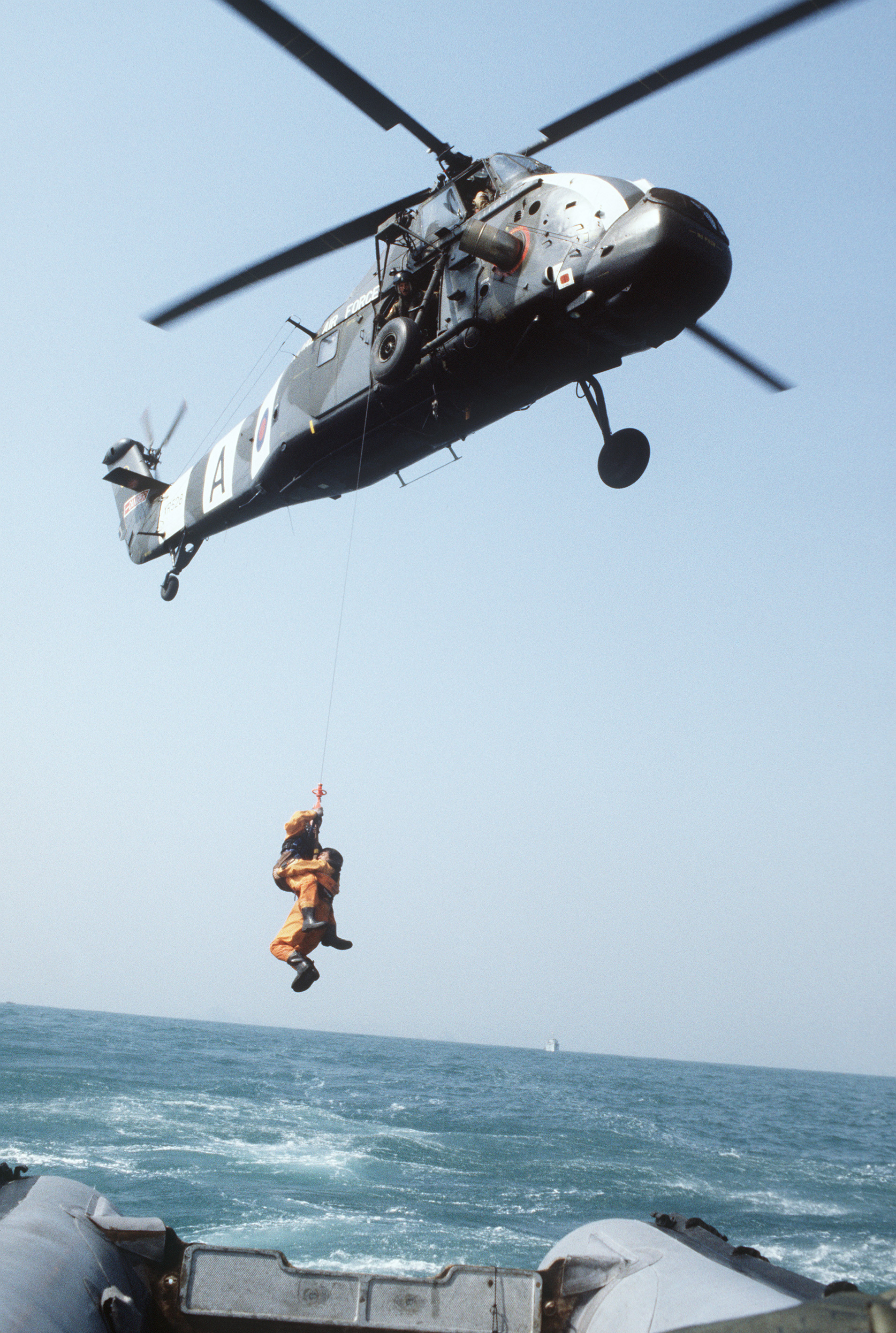
The survivors of a simulated aircraft crash are hoisted aboard a Royal Air Force Westland Wessex HC Mk 2 helicopter from No. 28 (AC) Squadron in 1983.

The Royal Air Force was the smallest contingent of the British Forces and was stationed in both Kai Tak Airport as well as the airfield in the New Territories known as Sek Kong.

No. 28 (AC) Squadron and the larger Royal Air Force infrastructure located to RAF Sek Kong in the late 1970s leaving Royal Air Force logistics elements to maintain operations at Kai Tak, e.g. RAF movers and suppliers remained to maintain the logistical link between RAF Hong Kong and the United Kingdom. The squadron flew up to 8 Westland Wessex HC Mk 2 helicopters from RAF Sek Kong. Tasks included support of the civil power, support of the British Forces and search and rescue.

About 20 years later, RAF personnel returned from Sek Kong to Kai Tak, mounting operations from that airport in the months prior to the 1997 handover.

In addition, the Hong Kong Government also maintained an "airforce". This airforce as per the land unit of RHKR (V), was an arm of the Hong Kong Government, supported by RAF personnel seconded to serve in the Hong Kong Auxiliary Air Force.

Royal Hong Kong Auxiliary Air Force 1970–1993 – handed over to GFS

- Hong Kong Volunteer Defence Corps – Air Arm 1930–1949
- Hong Kong Auxiliary Air Force 1949–1970 – see RHKAAF

Royal Air Force units which visited or were stationed in Hong Kong included:

- No. 681 Squadron RAF (September–December 1945)
- No. 1331 Wing RAF Regiment (circa 1946)
- No. 96 Squadron RAF (1946)
- No. 1430 (Flying Boat Transport) Flight RAF (1946)
- Japan Force Communications Flight RAF (circa 1946)
- No. 132 Squadron RAF (1945–1946)
- No. 200 Staging Post RAF (1945–1946)
- No. 215 Squadron (Transport) (1945–1946)
- Hong Kong Communication Flight Squadron RAF (1945–1947)
- No. 88 Squadron RAF (1946–1951)
- No. 209 Squadron (Maritime Patrol) (1946–1955)
- No. 110 Squadron RAF (1947)
- No. 81 Squadron RAF (1947–1958)
- No. 1903 Flight RAF and No. 656 Squadron RAF (1948–1949)
- No. 28 Squadron RAF(1949–1951; 1955; 1957– 1967; 1968–1978; 1996–1997)
- No. 80 Squadron RAF (1949–1955) with Supermarine Spitfire F.24 & de Havilland Hornet F.3
- No. 205 Squadron (Maritime Reconnaissance) (1949–1958)
- Royal Hong Kong Auxiliary Air Force (1949–1993)
- Hong Kong Auxiliary Flight (1949–1950)
- Hong Kong Auxiliary Squadron (1950–1953)
- Hong Kong Auxiliary Air Force Wing (circa 1953)
- Hong Kong Fighter Squadron (circa 1953)
- No. 60 Squadron RAF (1961–1968)
- No. 846 Squadron FAA (1963–1964) (RAF Kai Tak)
- No. 103 Squadron RAF (1963–1969)
- No. 110 Squadron RAF (1964–1969)
- No. 45 Squadron (Bomber) (1965–1970)
- No. 847 Squadron FAA (1970) (RAF Kai Tak)
- No. 41 Squadron RAF (1973; McDonnell Douglas Phantom in UK service jets)
- No. 22 Squadron (Anti-shipping patrol), 1996–1997
- RAF Police
- No. 60 Squadron
- No. 681 Squadron (Photo Reconnaissance)
- 114th (Hong Kong) Squadron RAF
- No. 367 Wireless Unit
- No. 368 Wireless Unit
- No. 117 Signals Unit (Tai Mo Shan), w.e.f. January 1959 when it was relocated from Mount Davis (West end of Hong Kong Island)
- ASF (Catering Squadron)
- GEF (Ground Radio)
- Medical Supply Squadron
- No. 444 Signals Unit (Stanley Fort), 1971 to 1977

Sources indicate that 444 Signals Unit (SU) formed officially within No. 90 (Signals) Group RAF, Strike Command with effect from 16 August 1971, and was established as a lodger unit at Stanley Fort, Hong Kong. The primary role of 444 SU was to act as a ground station for the Skynet satellite communications system, responsibility for operating the Skynet system having been vested in the RAF in the late 1960s, under the Rationalisation of Inter Services Telecommunications (RISTACOM) agreement. It would appear that the equipment operated by 444 SU had been located previously at RAF Bahrain (HMS Jufair).

On 1 May 1972, No. 90 (Signals) Group was transferred from RAF Strike Command to RAF Maintenance Command and as a consequence 444 SU became a Maintenance Command unit on this date. On 31 August 1973, both 90 (Signals) Group and Maintenance Command were disbanded, to be replaced on the following day by the new RAF Support Command. All of the units and locations previously controlled by the disbanded formations were transferred to Support Command with effect from 1 September 1973 and 444 SU therefore became a Support Command unit. This was to prove short-lived, however, for on 1 November 1973, 444 SU and the unit responsible for maintaining the Skynet ground station at RAF Gan – 6 SU – were both transferred to the command of the Air Officer Commanding in Chief Near East Air Force (NEAF). At this time 444 SU and 6 SU formed part of the Defence Communications Network (DCN) and the DCN elements of both units came under the functional control of the Controller DCN, Ministry of Defence.

On 1 August 1975, administrative and engineering responsibility for all of the units of RAF Hong Kong, including 444 SU, were transferred from NEAF to RAF Strike Command – functional control of these units being retained by the Vice Chief of the Air Staff via Commander RAF Hong Kong. Subsequently, with the disbandment of HQ NEAF on 31 March 1976, control of RAF Hong Kong and its component units were transferred in total to Strike Command. On 28 March 1976, RAF Gan closed and 6 SU disbanded formally on the same date, the latter's satellite communications equipment being transferred to 444 SU.

444SU was hosted at Stanley Fort by the British Army.

Sources indicate that 444 SU disbanded on the 31 December 1977.

- Composite Signals Unit

A list of RAF Stations in Hong Kong:

- RAF North Point (Hong Kong)
- RAF Little Sai Wan
- RAF Mount Davis home of 117 Signals Unit relocated 1959 (without living accommodation) to RAF Tai Mo Shan
- RAF Sha Tin – (no ICAO code) from 1949-1970s. Severely damaged by Typhoon Wanda in 1962. Demolished to make way for Sha Tin New Town.
- RAF Sek Kong – (VHSK) served as Vietnamese Detention Centre 1980s
- RAF Kai Tak – (VHKT) later as Kai Tak International Airport

A list of Royal Air Force operations facilities:

- Tai Po Tsai
- Cape Collinson
- Batty's Belvedere
- Kong Wei, RAF Sek Kong
- Chung Hom Kok
- Wang Fung Terrace, Tai Hang (Happy Valley)

Search and rescue operations conducted by the RAF and Royal Navy were later transferred to the Government Flying Service (GFS).

=== Other facilities ===
- British Military Hospital, Hong Kong
- Medical centres at Victoria Barracks, Lyemun Barracks, Stanley Fort, Whitfield Barracks, Sham Shui Po, Choy Hung, MRS Sek Kong and Lo Wu.
- British Forces Broadcasting Service
- Navy, Army and Air Force Institutes (NAAFI)
- Blackdown Barracks, Hong Kong (彩虹軍營) – near Kai Tak; now is Rhythm Garden (采頤花園), car park building, and Canossa Primary School.
- Mount Austin Barracks – near Peak Tram terminus at Victoria Peak
- Royal Hong Kong Regimental Headquarters near Happy Valley – demolished 1995

=== China Fleet Club ===
Hong Kong became an important port of call for many naval ships passing through the Far East. Besides Lan Kwai Fong, Royal Navy sailors had their own entertainment facility called the "China Fleet Club".

A timeline of the China Fleet Club:

- 1900–1903 local Hong Kong businessman and Royal Navy's China Fleet to raise funds for a Royal Naval Canteen at Naval Docks, Hong Kong
- 1929 old canteen building demolished and replaced with new building
- 1929–1934 Temporary CFC at Gloucester Road
- 1933 cornerstone laid by Admiral Sir Howard Kelly, G.B.E., K.C.B., C.M.G., M.V.O., then Commander-in-Chief, China Station; new seven-storey China Fleet Club building called "The Old Blue"
- 1941–1945 CFC serves as Japanese Naval HQ in Hong Kong during the Second World War
- 1945 CFC re-occupied by RN
- 1952 Coronation Annex added
- 1982, 16 July The Final Demolition Party held in Club before move to Sun Hung Kai
- 1982–1985 CFC relocated to temporary site at Sun Hung Kai Centre
- 1985 25-storey Fleet House new home for CFC
- 1986 Plans to relocate CFC to UK begins
- 1989 Construction of China Fleet Country Club in Saltash begins
- 1991 Construction of China Fleet Country Club in Saltash completed and opens in June
- 1992 CFC in Hong Kong closes

== See also ==
- Hong Kong Garrison (People's Liberation Army)
- Military of Portuguese Macau
- Hong Kong Defence Force (Imperial Japanese Army)
