= Gun Club Hill Barracks =

Barracks in Hong Kong

- Chinese: 槍會山軍營
- Hong Kong
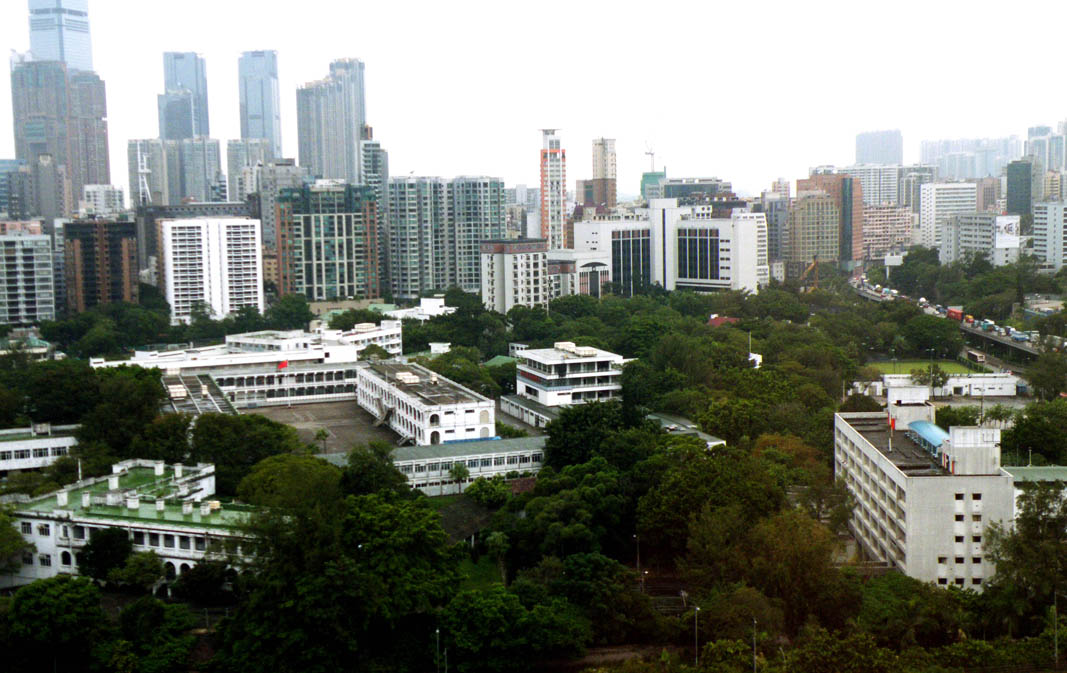
- Gun Club Hill Barracks

Site information
- Type: Barracks

Location
- Location within Hong Kong
- Coordinates: 22.303°N 114.177°E

Site history
- Built: circa 1863
- Built for: War Office
- In use: 1863-Present

Garrison information
- Occupants: People's Liberation Army

Gun Club Hill Barracks
- Traditional Chinese: 槍會山軍營 槍會山兵房
- Simplified Chinese: 枪会山军营
Transcriptions
Standard Mandarin
- Hanyu Pinyin: Qiāng Huì Shān Jūnyíng
Yue: Cantonese
- Yale Romanization: Chēung wúih sāan gwān yìhng Chēung wúih sāan bīng fòhng
- Jyutping: Coeng1 wui5 saan1 gwan1 jing4 Coeng1 wui5 saan1 bing1 fong4

Gun Club Hill Barracks are barracks in King's Park, or in Jordan, Hong Kong formerly used by British Army garrisons during British colonial rule. The military began using the area shortly after 1860 when the British acquired Kowloon. The barracks are bounded by Austin Road, Jordan Path, Gascoigne Road and Chatham Road South.

The barracks are currently occupied by the People's Liberation Army (PLA) who began using the facility after the transfer of sovereignty over Hong Kong on 1 July 1997. The compound now includes a hospital constructed for the People's Liberation Army, Hong Kong, completed around 1997.

== General information ==
A long-standing part of Hong Kong's military history, the Gun Club Hill Barracks arose out of the need to house soldiers on the Kowloon Peninsula following the cession of the area under the 1863 Treaty of Tientsin following the Second Opium War. The British were in need of additional military facilities and had begun scouting sites on the Kowloon Peninsula. The purpose was not only to house garrisons but also provide military defences on both sides of the harbour. With the shoreline being used for civilian activities, sites in the King's Park area were selected to establish encampments. The area, dotted with gardens, streams and paddy fields was a popular place to hunt birds and, once the military encampments were established, several firing ranges were set up for training. Despite the lack of verification, Sinologist R.G. Horsnell believes it is plausible that is how this area got its name.

The barracks compound is about 10 hectares (25 acres), although the original Gun Club Hill Barracks encompassed a much larger area. The military organised a series of tented encampments situated on where now stands Kowloon Park, Gun Club Hill and King's Park. They were connected to civilian areas by horse trails in the Chatham Road area. Through the years the area has been whittled down to ‘Gun Club Hill’ a smaller portion of the King's Park area between Jordan and Austin Road.

== 1860-1889 ==
During this period, there were no permanent structures so troops were rotated in from the Murray and Victoria Barracks. Tents and matsheds were used for accommodations and soldiers carried out shooting practice with rifles and larger weapons (Harfield, 1990) The first garrison to be stationed there were the "Gun Lascars", a group of Muslim artillery gunners originating from India.

The following is a list of some of the regiments stationed at the encampments during that time:

1863 Second Battalion 20th Foot (arrived in December)

1888 91st Argylls (arrived in December) stayed in matsheds during quarantine period

1892 Argylls replaced by the 1st Battalion, The King's Shropshire Light Infantry and quarantined in Kowloon matsheds because of smallpox outbreak on the troop ship from Alexandria

1899 Several companies of Royal Welch Fusiliers quartered

== 1900-1950 ==
Chatham Road, Austin Road, Jordan Road, Jordan Path and Gascoigne Road gradually ringed the grounds of Kowloon Cricket Club, and Gascoigne Road was named after Maj. Gen. Sir W.J. Gascoigne KCMG, Commander British Troops in China and Hong Kong from 1898–1903.

During 1903–04, the first permanent buildings were built for infantry, but very soon occupied by the Asiatic Artillery made up of Sikh and Punjabi Mussulman Companies called Gun Lascars. Four companies of soldiers were billeted in a new barrack blocks flanking the parade ground completed in 1905. According to the Public Record Office, the construction was of “brick and granite and best Manilla Hardwood; outlet walls of Amoy Brick and inner walls of Canton Brick" (Harfield, 1990, p. 357). In 1909, other buildings were constructed and the barracks’ layout shown as an Infants School, Followers Hut, Sikh/Muslim Cook-house, NCOs Quarters, Guard House, Sergeants Mess, Officers Mess, and a small Medical Centre. Gun Club barracks saw the organisation of its first battalion in 1910 consisting of about 446 soldiers including eight staff sergeants, 43 mounted troops, 312 soldiers from the artillery companies, 60 from engineer companies and 23 band members. The Officers’ Mess underwent a facelift with an annex added to the south elevation facing the Chatham Road entrance. A new remodelled entrance wing was added by 1930, which still stands.

Key dates: (p. 277) :

1904 Barracks Blocks, Officers' Mess, Guard House, Soldiers' Canteen etc. in existence

1905 Col. Lewis, RE (Rt.) visited Gun Club Barracks, which then housed the Asiatic Artillery. King's Park was described as "very rough" and presumably still being used for army training. Rosary Church was built in the same year in Chatham Road (then named De Voeux Road).

1909 Muslim/Sikh Cook-house and Followers' Hut in existence

1910 1st Battalion. The King's Own Yorkshire Light Infantry stationed at Gun Club Barracks

1914 Hong Kong – Singapore Battalion. RGA at Gun Club with D & E Companies quartered at Whitefield Barracks Four 10-pounder BL Mountain guns at Gun Club

1914-18 First World War. Armed Forces in Hong Kong mobilised.

1920s Hong Kong - Singapore Artillery still at Gun Club where these Indian troops trained their mule handlers. Gun Club still unfenced at this time

c. 1925 St. Mary's Can Ossian College built in Austin Road opposite the barracks

1935 Officers' Mess addition built

1942-45 Japanese Occupation. Equipment abandoned on withdrawal to Hong Kong island. Japanese artillery silenced by British guns on the island

1947 25 Field Regt. Royal Artillery (RA) stationed at Gun Club.

1949 58 Medium Regt. RA at Gun Club.

== 1950–1997 ==
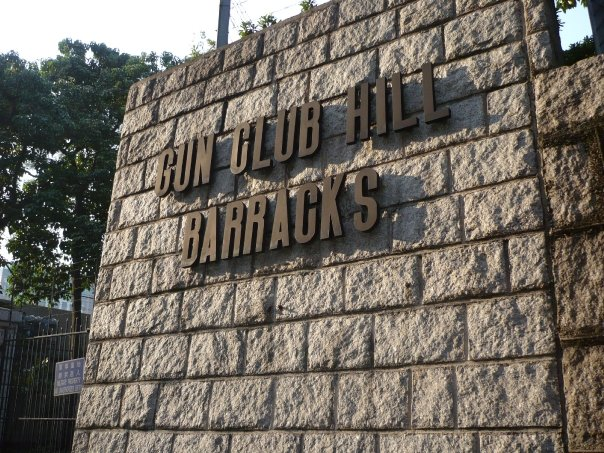
Austin Road entrance

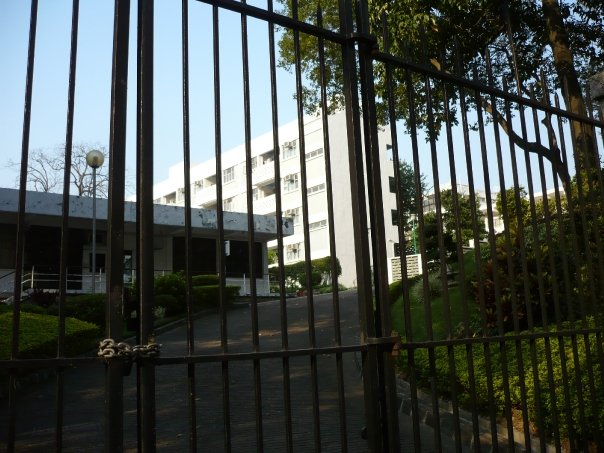

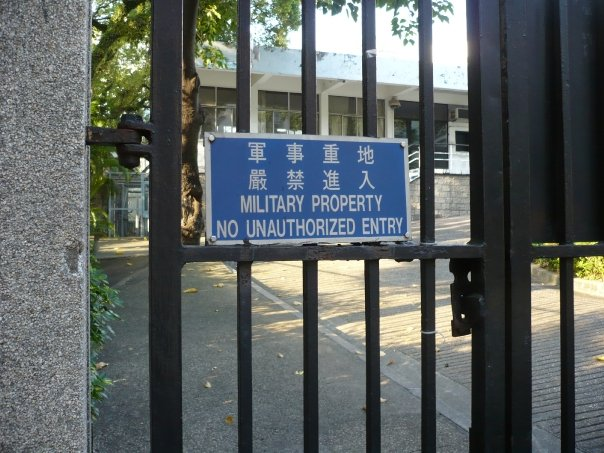
Military property

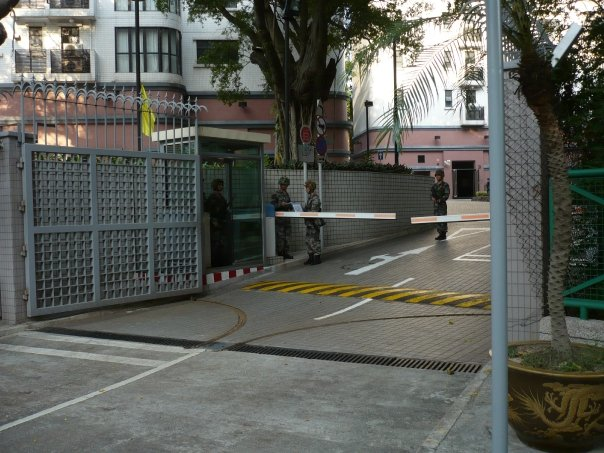
Side entrance to the barracks

After the Japanese occupation, a number of regiments were stationed at the Gun Club Barracks. In addition to the British infantry battalions which were regularly stationed there, other organizations shared the compound. The United Services Recreation Club and the Intelligence and Security Company, which occupied the old Colony Club building were among them.

The following is a chronological list of some of British military personnel stationed at the barracks during this time.

1956-1957 15 Medium Regiment Royal Artillery.

1965-1967 The First Battalion Queen's Own Buffs

1967 The First Battalion Lancashire Fusiliers,

1969 The First Battalion The Royal Welch Fusiliers

1971 The First Battalion The Black Watch

1974 The First Battalion The Royal Hampshire Regiment

1976-1977 The First Battalion The Light Infantry

Note: The barracks were not used exclusively by infantry battalions, the 34th Light Anti-Aircraft Regiment was stationed at Gun Club from 1961 until 1963.

In 1977, part of the Alanbrooke Block (British military quarters) and Infants’ School (Block 27) were demolished to make way for the construction of the New Gurkha MQs, Temple, Clinic and School started in the same year while the ten Intelligence and Security Company moved from Argyle Street Camp to colony Block (Block 36). Furthermore, Gurkha Transport Regiment and Gurkha Signal moved from Sham Shui Po Barracks to Gun Club and Victoria Junior School moved from Victoria barracks as well in 1978.

During excavations, a skeleton said to date from Japanese occupation was unearthed in 1986. In the same year, various new classrooms were built at Gun Club Primary School. Three years after this, there were two severe floods, one on 2 May and another on 20 May during Typhoon Brenda, which caused significant damage to equipment, buildings and vehicles of the MT compound.

The 1990s brought some new additions to the compound. A new military hospital was built facing Jordan Road after demolishing Colony Club (Block 36), St. Eligius’ Church and also the old gum shed. Some of the banyan trees were transplanted into other areas of the barracks and some were moved to the new Kowloon Walled City Park. Another remarkable event happened in 1995, the hand over of the barracks vacated by the British regiment, the Gurkha's, to Hong Kong Government. Lastly, in 1997, a new stage was begun with the handover of Hong Kong's sovereignty to China and Peoples Liberation Army became the new tenants for these historic facilities.

== 1997 onwards ==
Currently the barracks are being used by the Peoples Liberation Army who began using the barracks in 1997. It includes a hospital, housing blocks, a primary school, grocery stores and many other amenities.

In 2015 Albert Chan Wai-yip suggested that the barracks be decommissioned for more residential space.

== Gun Club Hill Barracks Military Hospital ==
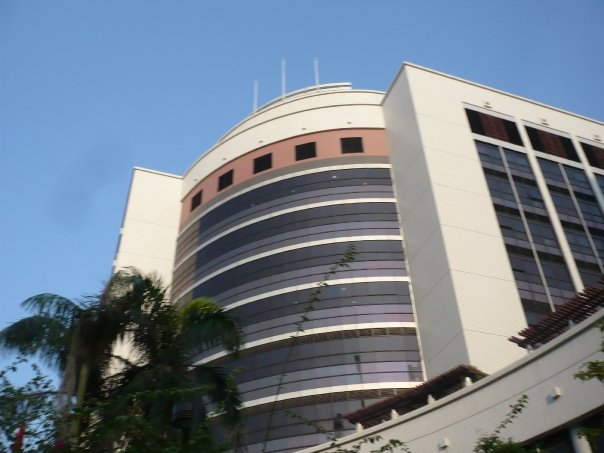
Front facade of the hospital

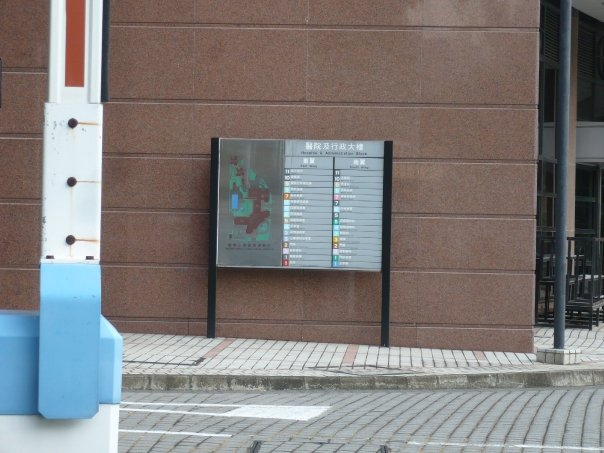
Hospital map panel

In 1994, construction began on a new hospital, and its construction was completed in 1997.

Gun Club Hill Barracks Military Hospital provides medical services for all PLA personnel stationed in Hong Kong. It is located in the Gun Club Hill Barracks compound, bordered by Gascoigne Road, Jordan Road and Jordan Path.

This multifunctional facility with nearly 17,000 square metres (180,000 sq ft) of working space, includes six buildings: a hospital, a multi-purpose building, a restaurant, two staff quarter blocks and a single-storey changing block (Architectural Services Department, 1997).

The Hospital Building is the principal building of the complex and features a crescent-shaped Low Block and an L-shaped 11-storey High Block. It includes such medical facilities as general surgical wards, out-patient rooms and an X-ray laboratory. The Composite Building is a seven-storey rectangular block next to the primary structure which provides support for the whole complex and many of the mechanical and electrical facilities are stored there.

== Conservation status ==
Some buildings within the Gun Club Hill Barracks have been listed Grade II and III.

== Troops ==
Troops were rotated from the Wellington and Victoria Barracks on Hong Kong Island. A list of troops stationed at the barracks:

- Second Royal Welch Fusiliers (1899)
- 91st Argylls (1888)
- 1st Battalion King's Shropshire Light Infantry (1892)
- 1st Battalion King's Own Yorkshire Light Infantry↓
- 25th Field Regiment, Royal Artillery (1948)
- 15th Medium Regiment RA (1 April 1955 - 25 September 1957)
- First Battalion Lancashire Fusiliers (1967)
- First Battalion Royal Welch Fusiliers (1969–71)
- First Battalion Royal Hampshire Regiment (1974–76)
- 1st Battalion, the Black Watch (1971–73)
- 10th Intelligence and Security Company (1977)
- 28 Squadron, The Gurkha Transport Regiment (-1997)
- 248 Gurkha Signal Squadron (-1997)
- Sikh and Punjabi Mussulman Companies
- Hong Kong Singapore Battalion Royal Artillery
