= List of army barracks in Hong Kong =

== Barracks existed in Hong Kong before 1997 ==
The following barracks existed in Hong Kong before 1997.

- Argyle Street Camp, built as a refugee camp before World War II
- Bowring Camp
- Chamham Road Camp
- Dodwell's Ridge Camp
- Erskine Camp
- Lyemoon Barracks
- Little Sai Wan Camp
- Murray Barracks
- North Point Camp, built as a refugee camp before World War II
- Sai Kung Camp
- Shamshuipo Barracks
- Sunny Farm Camp
- Victoria Barracks
- Wellington Barracks
- Whitfield Barracks

== Barracks/Camps given to the HKSAR Government in 1997 ==
The following barracks were given to the HKSAR Government in 1997.

- Mount Austin Mansions Block A and E
- Royen Court
- Cape Mansions
- Harcourt Place
- So Kon Po Sport Ground
- Blackdown Barracks
- Joint Movements Unit, Kai Tak
- British Military Hospital
- Tudor Court
- Vista Panorama
- Kowloon Tsai Married Quarters
- St. George's School
- Mission Road Sports Ground
- Burma Lines Camp
- Lo Wu Camp (now Lo Wu Correctional Institution)
- Lo Wu Firing Range
- Dills Corner Camp
- Beas Stables Married Quarters
- Ping Chau Training Camp
- High Island Training Camp
- Naval Base, North Stonecutters
- Perowne Camp
- Gordon Hard
- Pearl Island Married Quarters

== Barracks that still exist in Hong Kong ==
The following barracks still exist in Hong Kong now.

- Central Barracks
  - Headquarters House
- Chek Chue Barracks
- Ching Yi To Barracks, formerly known as "Queen's Line"
- Western Barracks
- Gun Club Hill Barracks
- Kowloon East Barracks, formerly known as "Osborn Barracks"
- No. 1A Cornwall Street
- Ngong Shuen Chau Barracks
- Shek Kong Barracks
  - Northern Compound of Shek Kong Barracks
  - Southern Compound of Shek Kong Barracks
  - Shek Kong Airfield
- San Tin Barracks
- Tam Mei Barracks - former Cassino Lines
- Gallipoli Lines - named for Gallipoli Campaign of World War I
- San Wai / Ting Ling Firing Range
- Tai O Barracks
- Tsing Shan Close Quarter Battle Range and Tsing Shan Firing Range
- Military Transportation Centre, Chek Lap Kok

== See also ==
- Kohima Camp
