= Harcourt Garden =

Park in Admiralty, Hong Kong

Coordinates: 22.27878°N 114.16663°E

- Traditional Chinese: 夏慤花園
- Simplified Chinese: 夏悫花园
Transcriptions
Standard Mandarin
- Hanyu Pinyin: Xiàquè Huāyuán
Yue: Cantonese
- Jyutping: haa6 kok3 faa1 jyun4

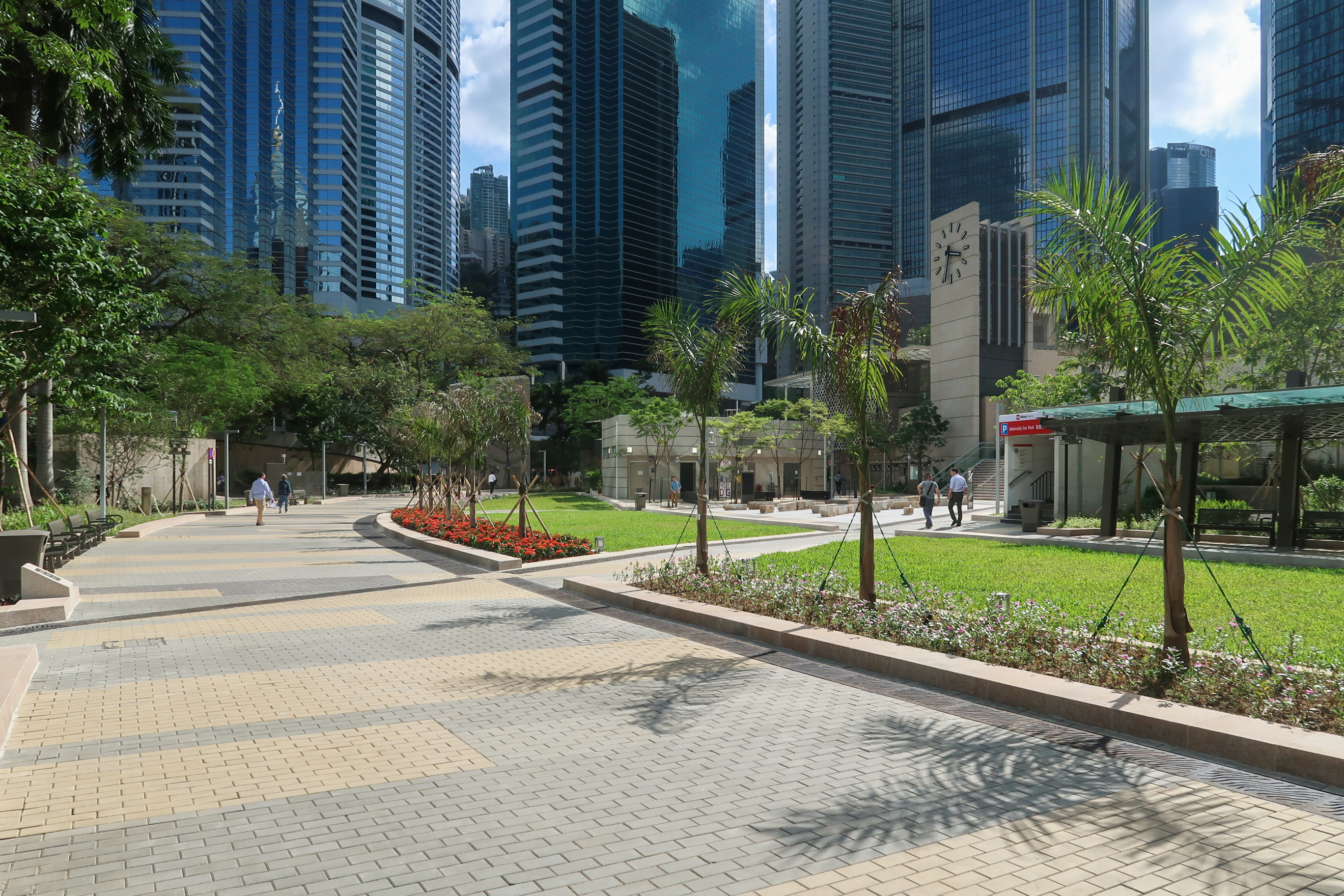
Harcourt Garden after South Island line construction works in 2018.

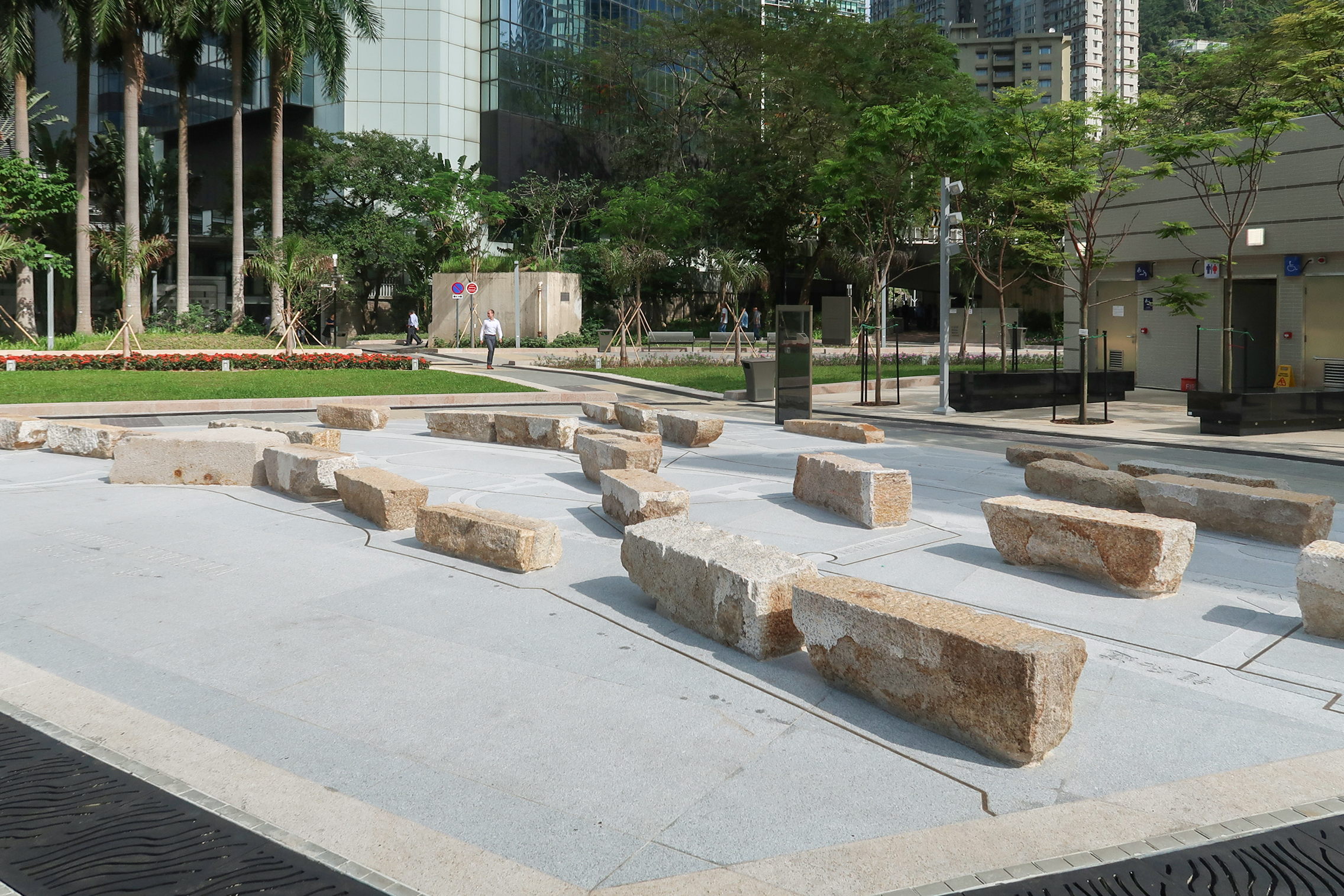
29 granite blocks, originally part of a mid-19th century seawall and found at the works site, are displayed in the garden.

Harcourt Garden (Chinese: 夏慤花園; Jyutping: haa6 kok3 faa1 jyun4) is a small urban park in Admiralty, Hong Kong, constructed in the mid-1990s. To the east of the park is the Hong Kong Police Headquarters while to the west is Admiralty bus station. Like the adjacent Harcourt Road, the park is named for Admiral Cecil Harcourt, de facto governor of Hong Kong from September 1945 to June 1946.

== History ==
The park is on land reclaimed from Victoria Harbour in 1863.

As part of the large naval and military installations that dominated this area until the 1970s and 1980s, this site was formerly occupied by the Wellington Battery and the Military Hospital, all associated with the Wellington Barracks. The adjacent military arsenal is recalled in the name of Arsenal Street.

In 2013 to 2018, the garden was closed due to the expansion of Admiralty station for the South Island Line and the Sha Tin to Central Link. The garden now has a clock tower, new entrances to the station and several art pieces.

== Refurbishment ==
As of 2020, the park has been reopened after the construction directly below the site for the extension of Admiralty station. This expansion houses the terminus platforms of the new MTR South Island line (East) and Sha Tin to Central Link. The MTR has refurbished the garden and moved it to the rooftop of the station building.

== See also ==
- List of urban public parks and gardens in Hong Kong
