= Kohima Camp =

Coordinates: 22.3367°N 114.2651°E

Kohima Camp or Kohima Barracks as it was officially described (Chinese: 高希馬軍營) in Tai Po Tsai north of Clear Water Bay Peninsula was the site of a proposed new army barracks to house an additional British infantry battalion to be stationed in Hong Kong following a review of the needs of Hong Kong which had taken place over 1980-1981.

The purpose of the British Hong Kong Garrison and of its reinforcement by an additional infantry battalion was intended to demonstrate the British Government's commitment to the integrity and the security of Hong Kong in the run up to 1997. The land acquisition and construction works for the barracks were to be undertaken by the Hong Kong Government. Under the Hong Kong Defence Costs Agreement signed in 1981, the Hong Kong Government was required to bear 75% of the costs of maintaining the British garrison. The plans to introduce an additional infantry battalion and to complete the construction of the barracks were cancelled in 1984 following the Sino-British Joint Declaration on the Future of Hong Kong. The land became the site of the new Hong Kong University of Science and Technology in 1986.

Before the construction of the university, The Scout Association of Hong Kong made use of the camp as the site for the Hong Kong Diamond Jubilee Jamboree for the 75th anniversary of Hong Kong Scouting between 27 December 1986 and 1 January 1997.

== Name ==
The camp was named after Kohima, a town close to the eastern border of India. In 1944 the Imperial Japanese Army failed in an offensive operation at the Battle of Kohima, which marked the limit of the Empire of Japan.
