= Mount Austin Barracks =

British Army base in Hong Kong

Coordinates: 22.2713°N 114.1498°E

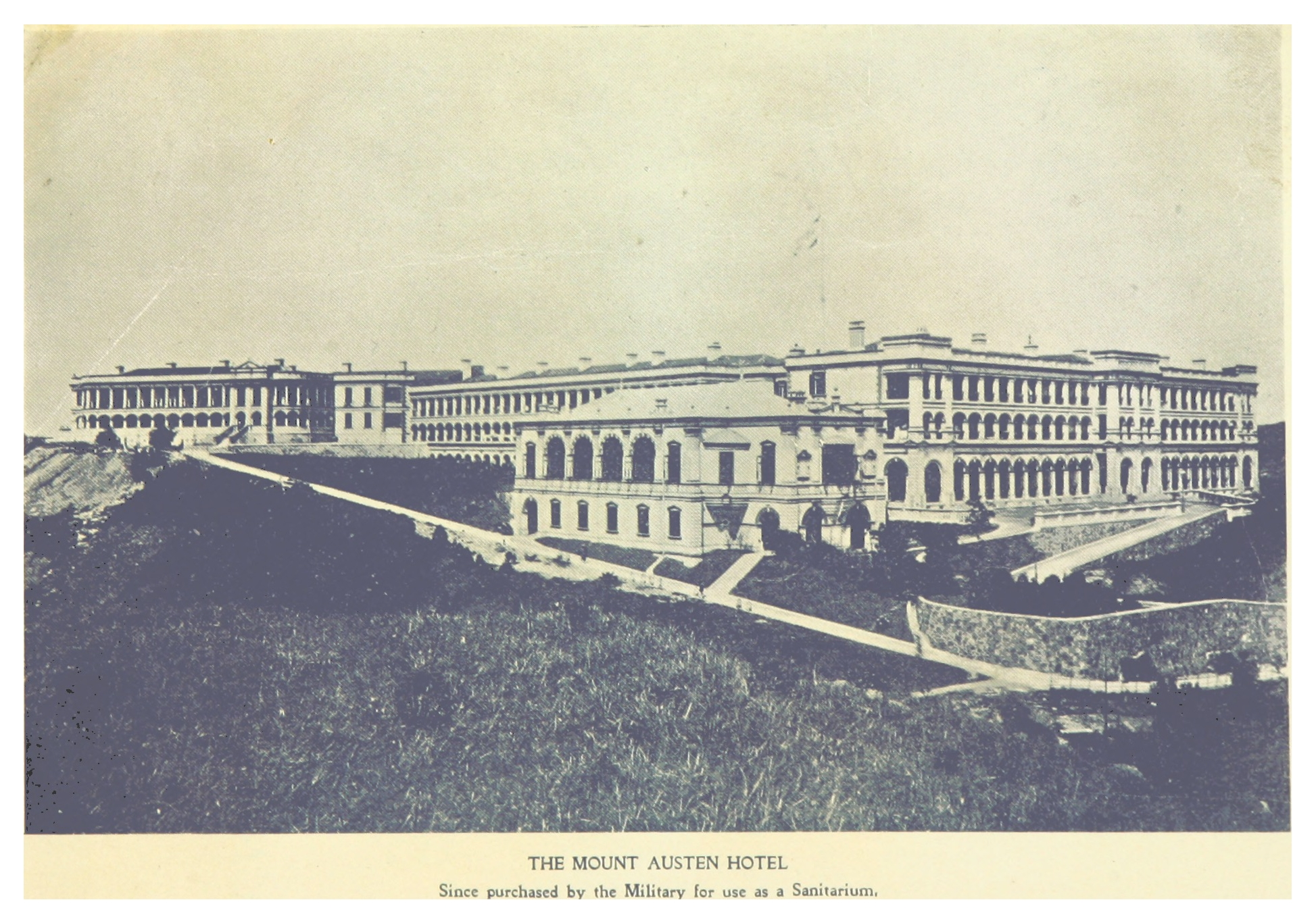
Mount Austin Hotel in the 1890s

Mount Austin Barracks was a British Army base in Hong Kong during British rule. It was acquired in 1897 and developed from the former Mount Austin Hotel. It is named after John Gardiner Austin, former Hong Kong Colonial Secretary. It was located near the Peak Tram terminus at Victoria Peak.

The base consisted of a series of multi-storey buildings on a hill. Damaged during World War II, it was later demolished.

Units that were stationed at the base:

- 1st Battalion, The East Surrey Regiment 1920s
