= HMS Thracian =

Two vessels of the Royal Navy have been named HMS Thracian after the Thracians:

- HMS Thracian (1809) was an 18-gun Cruizer-class brig-sloop commissioned into the Royal Navy in 1809. She was converted into a ship-sloop in 1822 and was broken up at Portsmouth in 1829.
- HMS Thracian (1920) was an S-class destroyer built for the Royal Navy during the First World War. After running aground during the Battle of Hong Kong in 1941, she was commissioned into the Imperial Japanese Navy as Patrol Boat No. 101. The Royal Navy regained her at the end of the Second World War in 1945 and scrapped her in 1946.
