= Wellington Barracks, Hong Kong =

Military barracks in Admiralty, Hong Kong

Wellington Barracks
- 威靈頓兵房
- Hong Kong

Site information
- Type: Barracks

Location
- Location within Hong Kong
- Coordinates: 22.278°N 114.166°E

Site history
- Built: circa 1850
- Built for: War Office
- In use: 1850-1990

Wellington Barracks (Chinese: 威靈頓兵房; Jyutping: wai1 ling4 deon6 bing1 fong4) was a military barracks located to the east of Garden Road in Admiralty, Hong Kong. One of many military complexes constructed by the British Army in the area, the land was returned to the Hong Kong government in the 1970s and gradually reverted to civilian use. As a result, the barracks was closed at the end of that decade, demolished in the mid-1980s and replaced with Harcourt Garden.

== History ==
=== Original hospital (1841) ===
During the First Opium War, the British occupied Hong Kong in 1841 and one year later, Hong Kong Island was ceded to them in the Treaty of Nanking. The new administration chose the site between the bottom of Government Hill and Wan Chai as land for military use. The British Army erected the Naval and Military Hospital in a matshed in January (or April) 1841. However, it was obliterated just six months later when a typhoon struck Hong Kong.

=== Wellington Battery ===
As early as 1842 a "Battery of 5 Guns" appeared on maps at the site which later became Harcourt Garden. Starting in 1854, it began being marked as "Wellington Battery", named after Arthur Wellesley, 1st Duke of Wellington. Starting from the 1900s, the battery ceased to appear on maps.

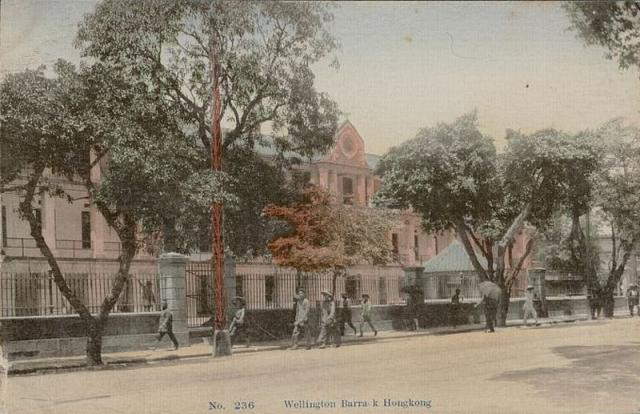
Drawing of the Wellington Barracks in the 1910s

=== Barracks ===
The new barracks was just one of several military buildings constructed by the British Army in Admiralty. These included Murray Barracks, Victoria Barracks and Admiralty Dock. Located to the east of Garden Road, Wellington Barracks was previously situated on Hong Kong Island's waterfront with Victoria Harbour, with a seawall running to the north of the barracks (however, the site is located much farther inland now due to the amount of land reclamation that has been undertaken since). It was connected with Victoria Barracks by a set of cables that ran across Queensway and was used to transport ammunition between the two sites.

The Golden Clock In 1890 a clock was installed in the top center of the main building to keep time at the military base. It was this very clock that gave Wellington Barracks its Chinese name "Gum Jung Ping Fong" and Admiralty MTR station its name in Chinese (金鐘; "Golden Clock").

Electricity was first supplied to the Wellington Barracks in 1910.

On 7 September 1945, following the end of the Japanese occupation of Hong Kong at the end of World War II, the Royal Navy re-established their naval base, HMS Tamar at Wellington Barracks, vacated by the British Army.

As Hong Kong began to expand over the years, the presence of the barracks proved to be problematic. This was because it divided Central and Wan Chai, since development on the site of the barracks was not permitted. This forced developers to construct commercial and residential complexes solely to the east of the barracks in Queen's Road East. As a result, the Government of Hong Kong repeatedly attempted to obtain the site from the military to unite the two districts, but to no avail.

In 1959, the Hong Kong Government paid HK$24 million to the War Department for the release of the land of the Wellington Battery area.

Eventually, the military relented and handed back the land to the government in the late 1970s. Both the Wellington and Victoria Barracks were demolished in the mid-1980s. The new Pacific Place was built on a fraction of the land previously occupied by Victoria Barracks, opening in 1990. The site of Wellington Barracks was replaced by Harcourt Garden.

== See also ==
- List of army barracks in Hong Kong
