= British Hong Kong Garrison =

British military force

The Hong Kong Garrison was a British and Commonwealth force that protected Hong Kong. In December 1941 during the Battle of Hong Kong in the Second World War, the Japanese Army attacked Hong Kong and after a brief but violent series of engagements the garrison surrendered. They were asked to assist the Hong Kong Government in keeping public order, if military force was necessary. The garrison also assisted in border patrol during waves of immigration. The garrison continued until 1995, when the Royal Hong Kong Regiment (The Volunteers) was disbanded prior to the handover of Hong Kong.

== Size and Diversity ==
The garrison expanded in 1854, adding a volunteer force of 99 men. This program expanded to over 2,200 men and women by the 1920s, known as The Volunteers. They played a large part when the Japanese invaded in 1941, with a force of 2,600 locals. This unit survived until a few years before the handover of Hong Kong to the PRC, being disbanded in 1995 as the last unit of the Hong Kong Garrison. The Indians were an important part of the Hong Kong Garrison. The majority of soldiers were from Britain, with some regiments from Canada, but nearly 30% were Indian troops. The Hong Kong-Singapore Royal Artillery and Hong Kong Regiment were 100% composed of Indian troops. However, Gurkha troops from Nepal replaced them after World War II, due to India's break from the Commonwealth and independence.

== Pre-World War Deployments and Duties ==
This is when the garrison first arrived to Hong Kong and what they did up until World War I.

=== First Acts ===
The garrison first arrived on the HMS Sulphur on 26 January 1841, during the first Opium War, and a year before Hong Kong was officially under British control. The first few years of their occupancy were plagued with disease, with a quarter of the garrison dying of Malaria in 1843 alone, leading to some traders regretting they ever invested in the island. Pushing forward, they helped to fortify the island of Hong Kong, such as coastal artillery batteries and tunnels throughout the 19th century, which proved useful during World War II in the Battle of Hong Kong.

=== Piracy ===
They fought against trade piracy for the duration of their existence, assisting the Royal Navy. They helped lower the amount of raids after 1869, and saw a rise again in the 1920s. The garrison’s original fix was a steam fleet constructed in Guangdong with collaboration from the Hong Kong government on cracking down on maritime raiding. Nationalist Chiang Kaishek took control of Nanjing in 1927 and highly valued the policing of its own waters, which subdued the rise by the 1930s.

== World Wars and the Battle of Hong Kong Involvement ==
The garrison's role in both World Wars and their most well-known engagement in the Battle of Hong Kong.

=== World War I ===
The garrison played an important role in both World Wars. In WW1, it served as the largest naval base in Asia. A part of the Hong Kong-Singapore Royal Artillery, left to serve in the Middle East, and 75 Britons were killed in their return to Europe to fight the Central Powers.

=== Battle of Hong Kong ===
They are most notably known for fighting against the Japanese in World War II. They delayed Japanese forces on many occasions, but never saw a victory. The British forces on the mainland of China evacuated to the island of Hong Kong on 11 December 1941. An Indian regiment and a volunteer force, known as the Rajput Defenders and Hughsiliers respectively, delayed the Axis powers for 5 hours before running out of ammo and being forced to surrender under the Japanese’ superior firepower. The defense ended on 25 December 1941, known as the Black Christmas, and the British authorities surrendered to the Japanese.

=== Aftermath of World War II ===
The Hong Kong Garrison assisted in the re-occupation of Hong Kong in August 1945 after the Axis Powers were defeated. The British 5th Fleet were the first ships to arrive in Hong Kong after the surrender of Japan, and following an agreement between the US and Britain that allowed Chinese Nationalist forces to use the port of Hong Kong. Patrols were sent out across the island and along the shores to capture the remaining Japanese and regain control. The Fleet provided a new supply of currency to the locals because the economy had been flooded with forged banknotes by the Japanese, and many citizens had been trading cigarette packets for four years. They established a temporary police force, distributed medical supplies, and ran clinics.

== Post-World War II Involvement ==
The garrison was active during the Cold War years. The 3rd Royal Tank Regiment joined reinforcements in Hong Kong when Chinese Communist forces reached South China during the Chinese Civil War. During the Korean War, Hong Kong served as a staging ground for Commonwealth forces, and served a similar purpose for the US Navy during the height of the Cold War. The garrison also helped maintain order during the 1956 and 1967 Hong Kong riots, which were waged over disputes on communism and workers’ rights.

== 1941 Garrison ==
This is the garrison of Hong Kong that surrendered in December 1941.

=== Command ===
- Commander Hong Kong Garrison - Maj.Gen. Christopher Maltby

=== Kowloon Brigade ===
  - C.O. - Brig. Cedric Wallis
- 2nd Bn, Royal Scots - Lt.Col. Simon E.H.E. White
- 5/7th Bn, Rajput Regiment - Lt.Col. J.C. Cadogan-Rawlinson
- 2/14th Bn, Punjab Regiment - Lt.Col. Gerald Ralph Kidd

=== Hong Kong Brigade ===
  - C.O. - Brig. John K. Lawson
- 1st Bn, The Middlesex Regiment (MG Battalion) - Lt.Col. Henry William Stewart
- Winnipeg Grenadiers - Lt.Col. John Louis R. Sutcliff
- Royal Rifles of Canada - Lt.Col. William James Horne

Several members of the 1st Bn were linked to the Hong Kong Chinese Regiment.

=== Fortress units ===
- H.Q. Fortress, Royal Engineers - Lt.Col. R.G.Lamb
- Hong Kong Volunteer Defence Corps - Col. H.Rose
- C.O. Royal Artillery - Col. E.H.M.Clifford
  - 8th Coast Regiment, Royal Artillery - Lt.Col. Selby Shaw
  - 12th Coast Regiment, Royal Artillery - Lt.Col. Richard J.L.Penfold
  - 5th Anti-Aircraft Regiment, Royal Artillery - Lt.Col. Frederick Denton Field
  - 1st (Hong Kong) Regt. Hong Kong and Singapore Royal Artillery - Lt.Col.John Corbet Yale

=== Aftermath ===
Following the Fall of Hong Kong to Japanese forces, most British personnel were captured, others died in the battle. For those able to escape (or later released) from Hong Kong, some managed to re-group in China. The Hong Kong Chinese Regiment and the British Army Aid Group kept the remaining elements of the Garrison alive and help it re-establish the British military after the Liberation of Hong Kong.

== Structure in 1989 ==
The British forces stationed in Hong Kong were called the "Hong Kong Garrison", which had the following structure:

- British Army units
  - Duke of Edinburgh's Royal Regiment (Berkshire and Wiltshire) – Light role infantry unit.
  - 6th Queen Elizabeth's Own Gurkha Rifles – Light role Gurkha infantry unit.
  - Royal Hong Kong Regiment (The Volunteers) – light role army reserve unit.
  - 660 Squadron, Army Air Corps.
  - 50th Command Workshop, Royal Electrical and Mechanical Engineers.
  - Hong Kong Provost Company & Hong Kong Dog Company, Royal Military Police.
  - 415th Maritime Troop, Royal Corps of Transport.
  - Defence Animal Support Unit, Royal Army Veterinary Corps
- 48th (Gurkha) Infantry Brigade
  - 2nd King Edward VII's Own Gurkha Rifles (The Sirmoor Rifles)
  - 7th Duke of Edinburgh's Own Gurkha Rifles
  - 247th Gurkha Signal Squadron, Royal Signals.
  - 67th Gurkha Field Squadron, The Queens Gurkha Engineers.
  - 68th Gurkha Field Squadron, The Queens Gurkha Engineers.
  - 70th Support Squadron, The Queens Gurkha Engineers.
  - 28th Gurkha Transport Squadron, Royal Corps of Transport.
  - 29th Transport Squadron, Royal Corps of Transport.
  - 31st Gurkha Transport Squadron, Royal Corps of Transport.
- Royal Navy Forces / Royal Marines
  - Peacock-class corvette
    - HMS Peacock
    - HMS Plover
    - HMS Starling
    - HMS Swallow
    - HMS Swift
  - Hong Kong Royal Naval Volunteer Reserve
  - One troop of the 40 Commando, Royal Marines.
- Royal Air Force Units
  - No. 28 Squadron RAF, Royal Air Force.
