= Victoria Barracks, Hong Kong =

Former barracks in Hong Kong

Victoria Barracks
- 域多利兵房
- Hong Kong
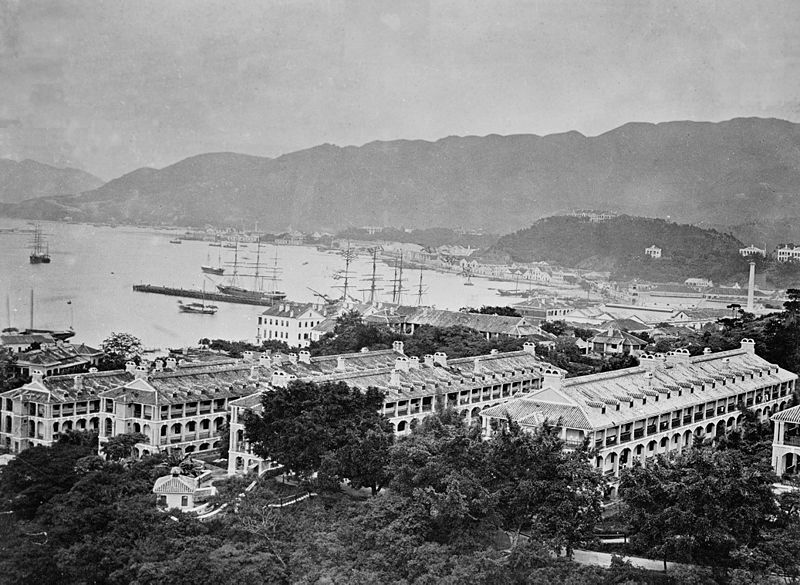
- Victoria Barracks, c 1870

Site information
- Type: Barracks

Location
- Location within Hong Kong
- Coordinates: 22.279°N 114.164°E

Site history
- Built: circa 1840
- Built for: War Office
- In use: 1840-1979

The Victoria Barracks (Chinese: 域多利兵房; Jyutping: wik6 do1 lei6 bing1 fong4) were a barracks in the Admiralty area of Central on Hong Kong Island, Hong Kong. The barracks were constructed between the 1840s and 1874, and situated within the area bounded by Cotton Tree Drive, Kennedy Road and Queensway. Together with Murray Barracks, Wellington Barracks and Admiralty Dock, the barracks formed a British military zone in Central. The barracks was named for Queen Victoria, monarch at the time of construction.

== History ==
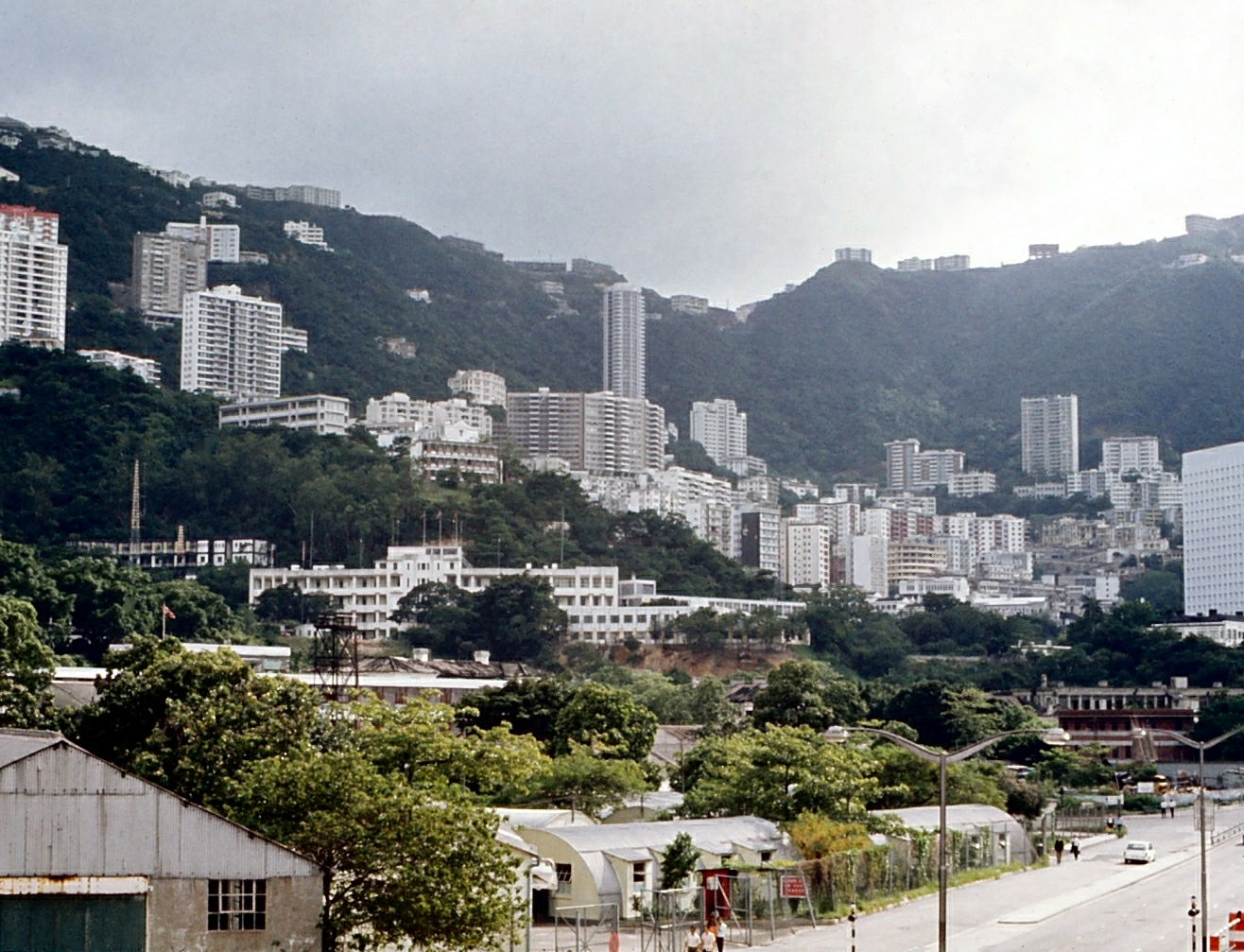
Victoria Barracks in 1971

The barracks were one of the first British military compounds in Hong Kong and were used by the Japanese during the Japanese occupation (1941–1945). They underwent major restoration after World War II. Part of the land was returned to the Hong Kong Government in 1967; most of the rest was transferred to the government in 1979.

According to the Hong Kong Heritage Society, a Shinto-style arch was built and a pillar stone was erected by the Japanese Navy during the war. These Japanese structures still existed in the barracks in the late 1970s.

Part of the barracks were subsequently used as a branch office of the Immigration Department; illegal immigrants went to the Victoria Barracks office for registration to apply for Hong Kong identity cards in 1979.

== Redevelopment ==
In March 1977, the Governor of Hong Kong appointed the Victoria Barracks Planning Committee to advise him and the Executive Council on the planning of the area; in September in the same year, the committee published the Report to the Governor-in-Council on the Future Development of Victoria Barracks.

The planning of the redevelopment of the Victoria Barracks had led to the strong public pressure in the late 1970s. According to the Report, the Royal Town Planning Institute and the Hong Kong Heritage Society objected to the setting up of the ad hoc committee, separate from the Town Planning Board.

In the report, the committee suggested that the public supported the preservation of the mature trees and the green zones, including the wooded slopes, in the barracks; also, it was suggested that Flagstaff House and other historic buildings should be preserved. The Hong Kong Squash Racquets Association supported the retention of the historic squash court building, which was later demolished during the redevelopment and replaced by a new one. The Scout Association of Hong Kong requested to be allocated some of the buildings and structures to set up a scout training centre.

Some people proposed that the government should re-site the proposed new secondary school, the government offices and the then Supreme Court (now the High Court).

In 1979, the Government released the final planning proposal; the Urban Council, the Conservancy Association and the Hong Kong Heritage Society were dissatisfied that the Government refused to preserve the whole site of the barracks.

Part of the site was converted to the Hong Kong Park while the southern part of the barracks was where Pacific Place, the High Court and Queensway Government Offices now stand.

== Historic Buildings ==
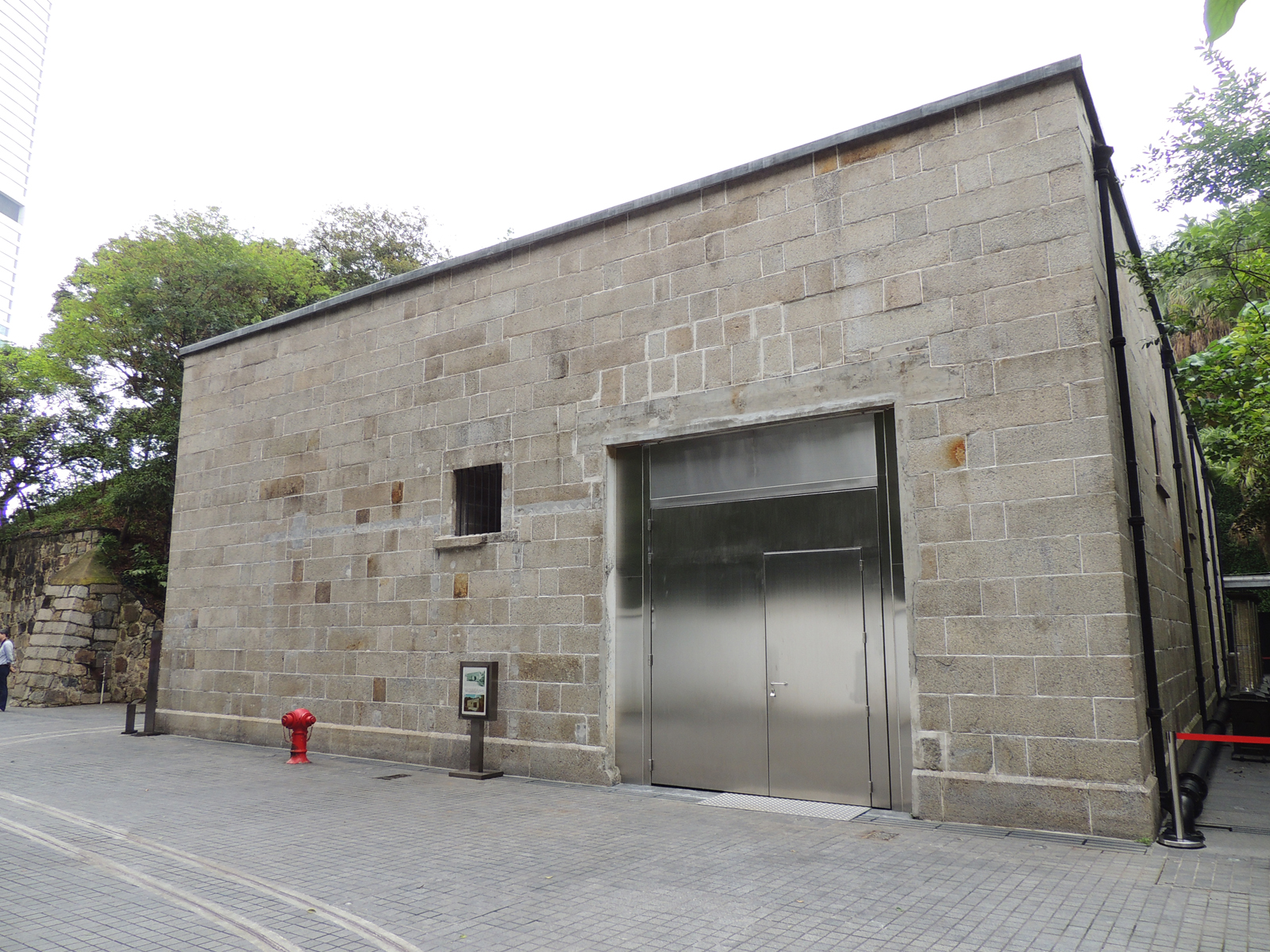
Former Explosives Magazine. Magazine A

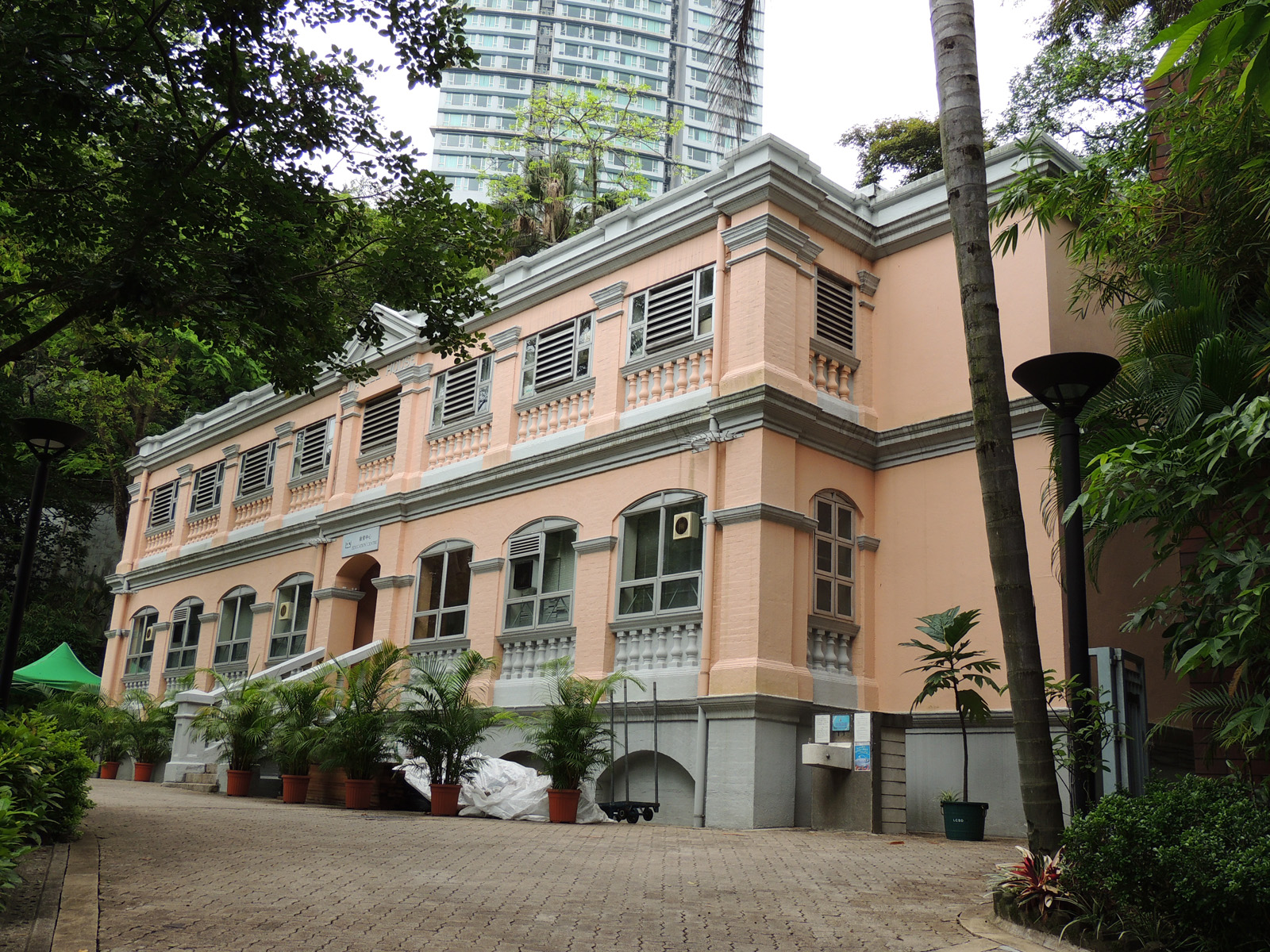
Wavell House in Hong Kong Park

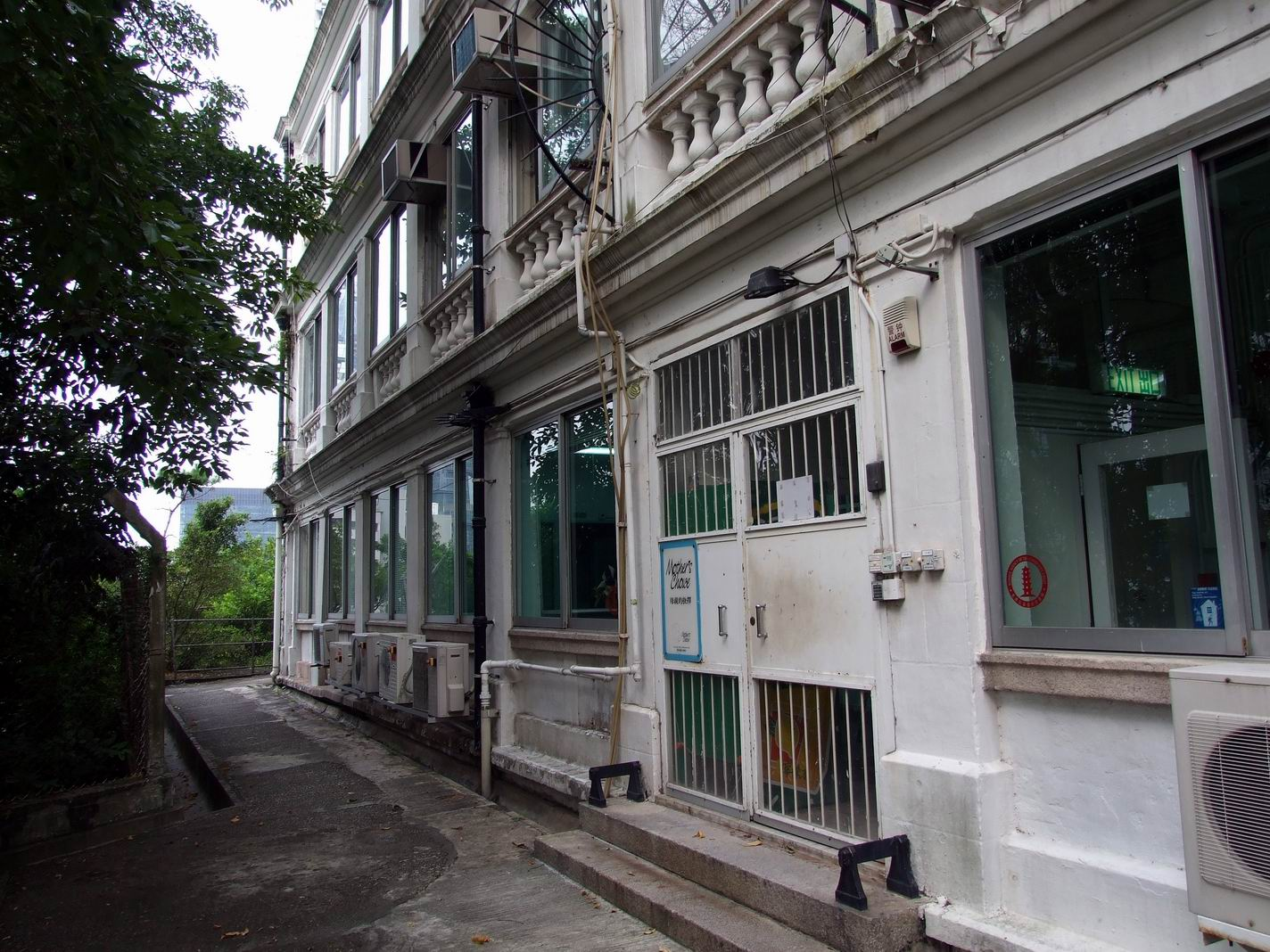
Montgomery Block at Kennedy Road

Some of the buildings within the barracks were preserved and graded as Grade I historic buildings:

- The Former Explosives Magazine complex contains two former explosives magazines and a laboratory building separated by earth mounds, known as traverses, which were built as buffers in case of explosions. The buildings are now part of the Asia Society Hong Kong Centre.
- Cassels Block (early 20th century), the former barracks for married British officers. Originally named as "Block C". Since 1992 this has housed the Hong Kong Visual Arts Centre. Likely named for Sir Robert Cassels, British Indian Army officer and Viceroy of India.
- Rawlinson House (1910), the former residence of the British Deputy General (also known as the "Deputy Commander, British Forces"), converted in the 1980s into a marriage registry. Two Warrant Officers' Married Quarters were integrated with it into a single building in the 1960s. Likely named for Henry Rawlinson, 1st Baron Rawlinson, British Army officer during World War I.
- Wavell House (early 20th century), the former quarters for married British officers, converted in 1991 into the aviary support centre (Education Centre). Named after Archibald Wavell, 1st Earl Wavell, British Army Field Marshal and Viceroy of India.
- Montgomery Block is currently home to Mother's Choice Limited. It was returned from the British Forces to the Hong Kong Government in 1967. Although members of the British forces and their families continued to occupy the flats until at least 1998. It was likely named for Field Marshal Bernard Law Montgomery, British Army Field Marshal
- Roberts Block has been occupied since 1986 by the Jockey Club New Life Hostel of the New Life Psychiatric Rehabilitation Association. It was returned from the British Forces to the Hong Kong Government in 1967. Although members of the British forces and their families continued to occupy the flats until at least 1971. Likely named for Frederick Sleigh Roberts, Field Marshal Lord Roberts of Kandahar and British Army commander during the British war with Afghanistan.

== Queen's Line ==
Ching Yi To Barracks (正義道軍營), formerly known as "Queen's Line", was part of the barracks. The current Ching Yi To Barracks is used by the People's Liberation Army. Dragon House and Paget House (百捷樓) were two of the buildings of the former Victoria Barracks within the area occupied by the current barracks.

== Destroyed buildings ==
The following buildings were destroyed when the barracks were redeveloped into the Park:

- Blocks A, B, C, D and E: They were built around 1868 for the Indian troops of the garrison. Block A and B were later used to accommodate the headquarters in the 1920s; A bamboo bridge was used to connect the two blocks during this period. Block D was used as the Headquarters of the Brigade of Gurkhas in the 1970s. The Victoria Barracks Planning Committee recommended that Block E should be preserved for community use in a report to the Governor and the then Executive Council.
- Alexander Block: Erected in the early 1900s.
- Birdwood Block was the identical twin of Cassels Block. Like the Cassels Block, it also had a stepped roof. The Block was named after Lt. General Sir William "Birdie" Birdwood" It was used as a married officers' quarters.
- Colvin Block was used by the Women's Royal Army Corps. Likely named for Mary Colvin, Director of the British Army Women's Royal Army Corps. Now the site of the British Council and British Consulate-General complex.
- Freyberg Block was built in 1931 and was used to house the Head of the Intelligence Services. Named for Bernard Freyberg, 1st Baron Freyberg VC, British Army officer and later Governor-General of New Zealand.
- Gort Block - living quarters likely named for John Vereker, 6th Viscount Gort VC
- Hamilton Block was returned from the British Forces to the Hong Kong Government in 1967.
- Kitchener Block was used as accommodation for school teachers. Named for Herbert Kitchener, 1st Earl Kitchener, British Secretary of State for War
- The Squash Courts building in the Barracks was the first such building built in Hong Kong.

== Gallery ==
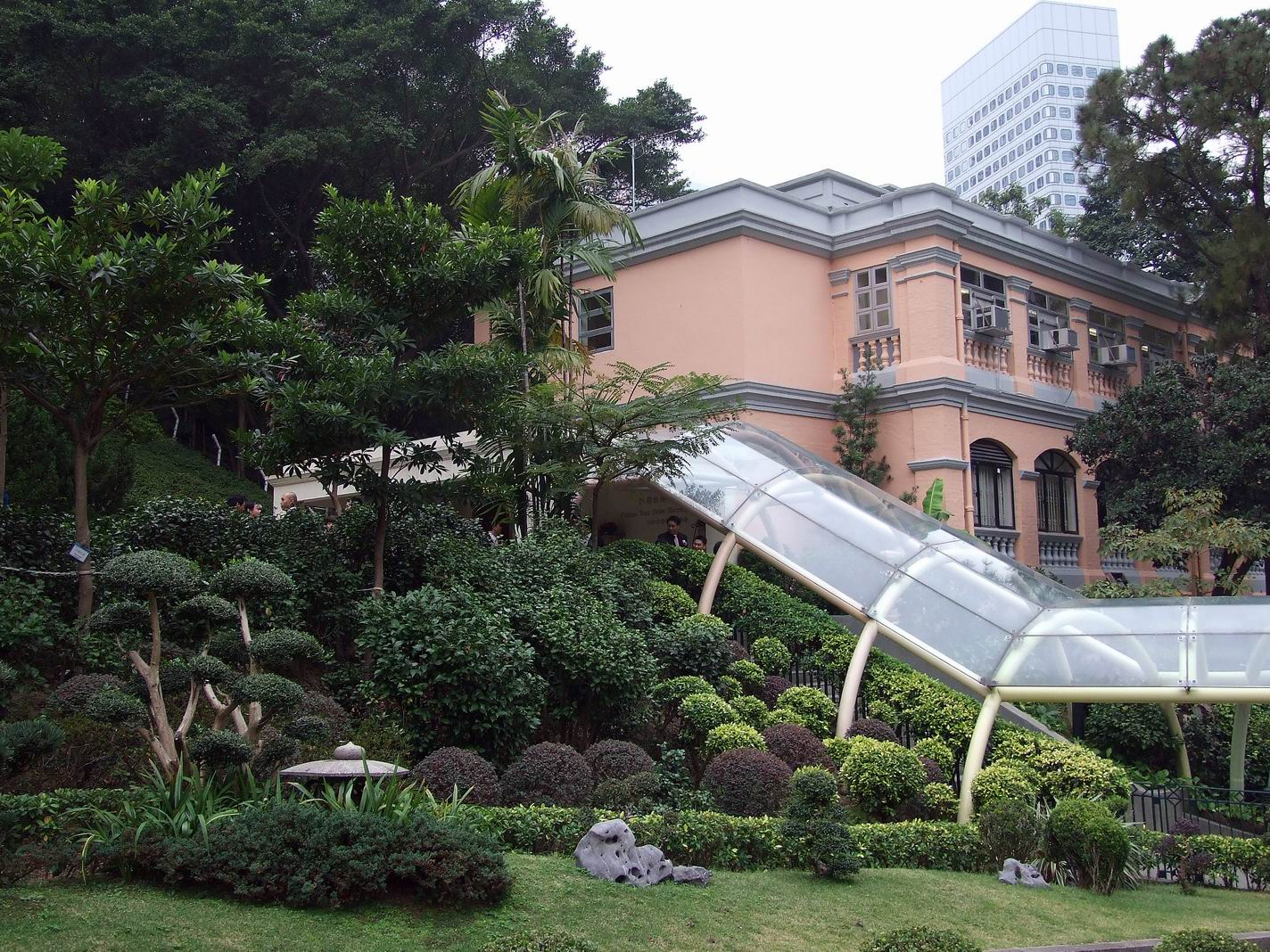
Rawlinson House, now used as the Cotton Tree Drive Marriage Registry

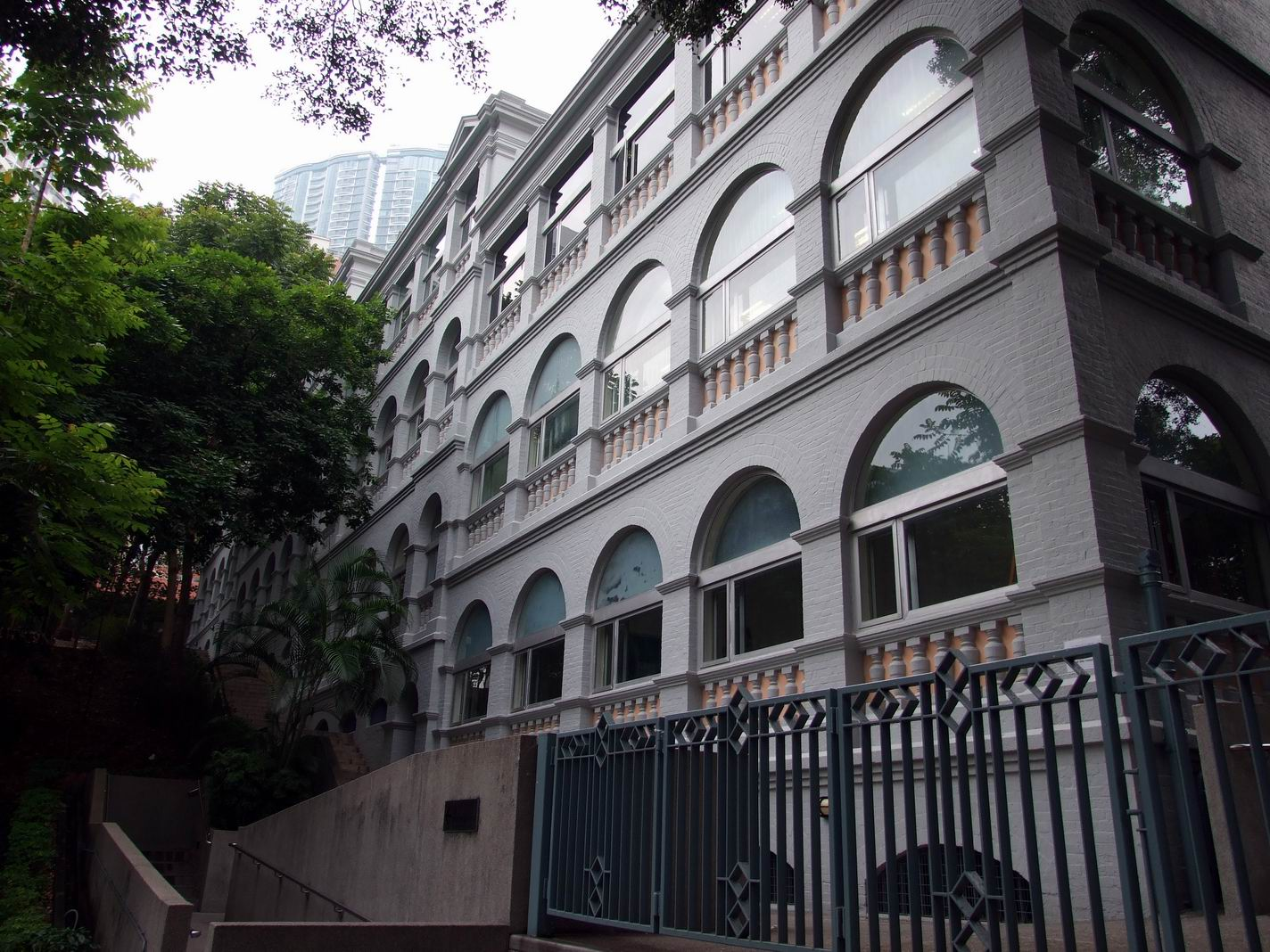
Cassels Block

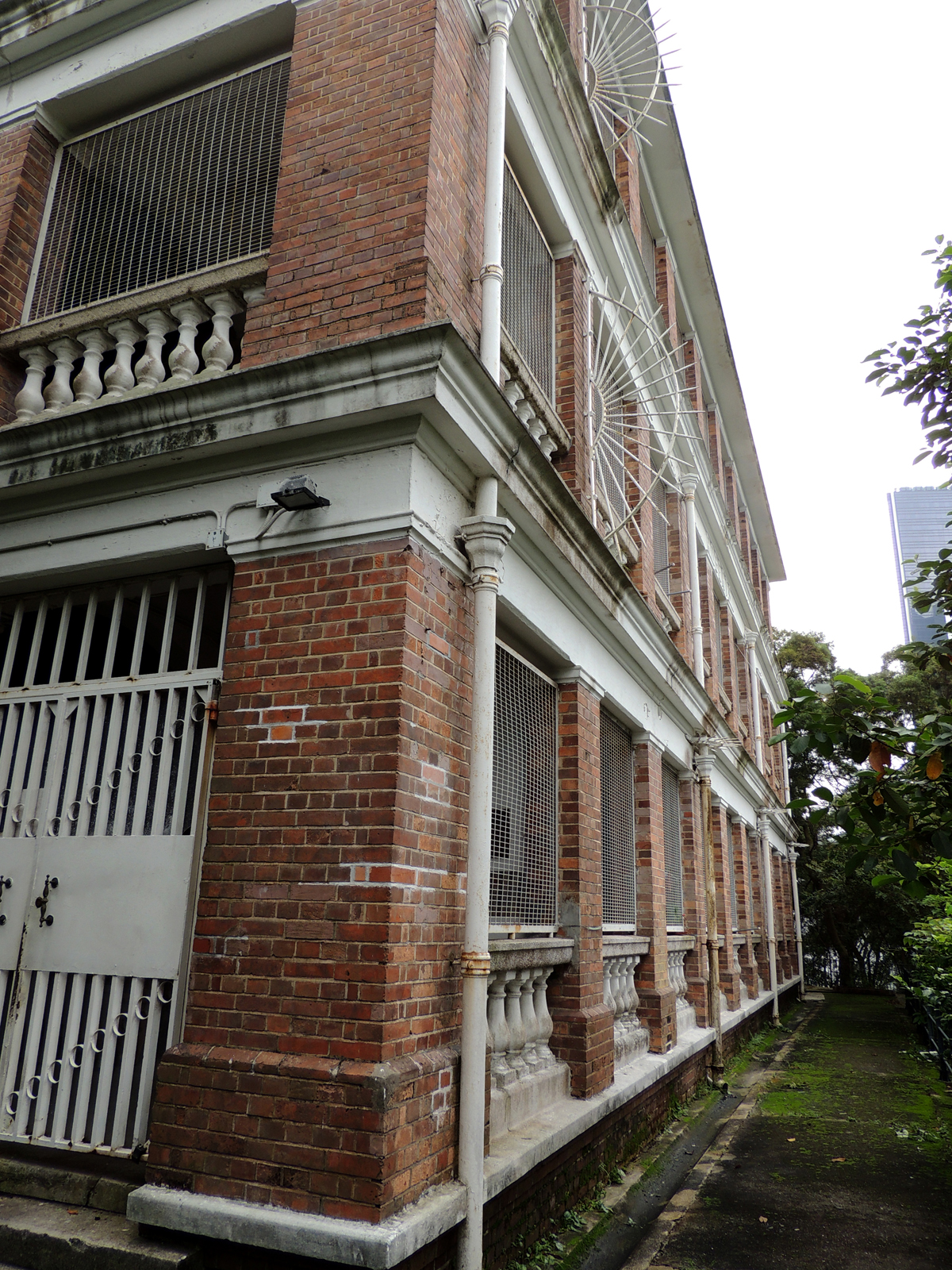
Roberts Block

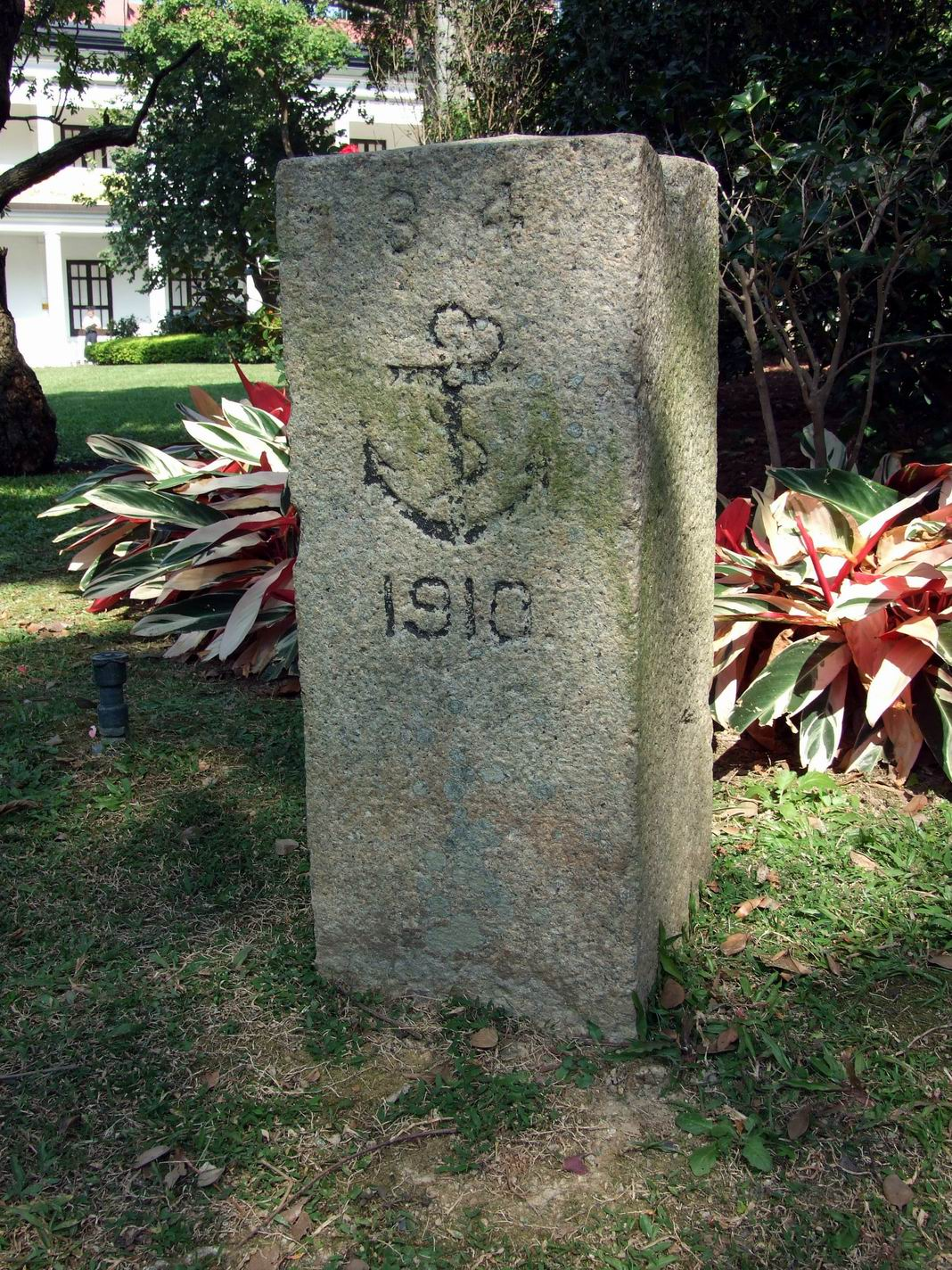
The historic stone which was once erected in the Barracks area, now on the lawn outside the Flagstaff House

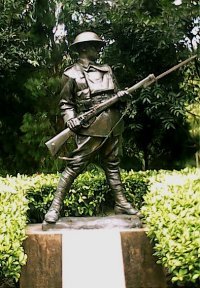
The Statue of an unnamed WWI British soldier in Hong Kong Park: a reminder of the historic background of the park. A Memorial plaque dedicated to all the defenders of Hong Kong in December 1941 through CSM John Robert Osborn VC and to commemorate the British Garrison at Hong Kong was later added.

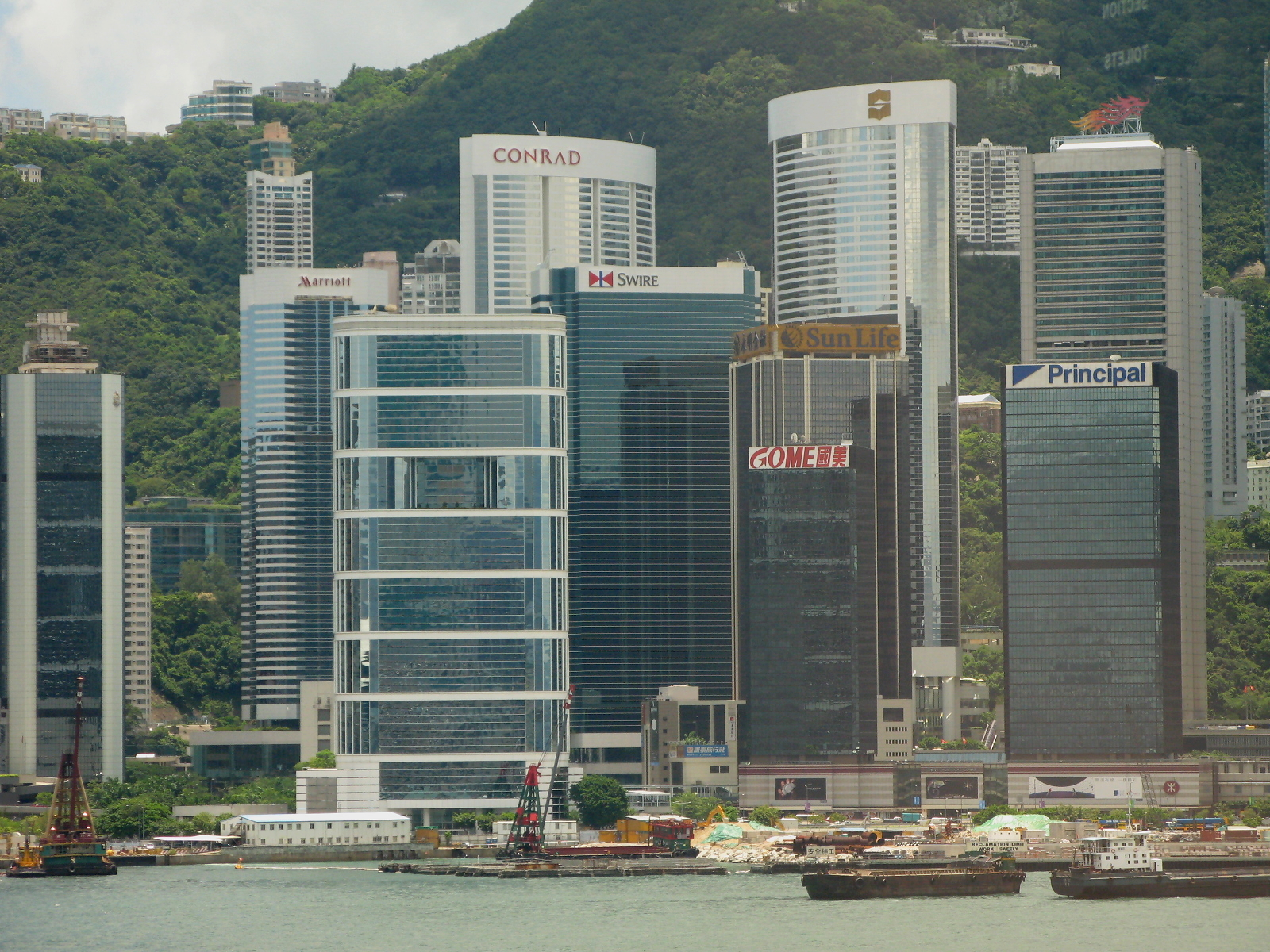
Pacific Place and the Queensway Government Offices (the tall building on the right) stand on the site where once the Victoria Barracks was located

== See also ==
- List of army barracks in Hong Kong
