= Cedric Wallis =

British soldier

- Born: 7 March 1896; Nottingham, England
- Died: 20 October 1982 (aged 86); Vancouver, Canada
- Burial place: Hamburg, Germany
- Spouse(s): Angela Van de Wouwer; Ingeborg Subbe
- Children: Angela Wallis
- Military career
- Allegiance: British Empire: British Indian Army
- Branch: British Army; British Indian Army
- Service years: 1914–1946
- Rank: Brigadier
- Unit: 7th Rajput Regiment
- Commands: 5th Battalion, 7th Rajput Regiment; Mainland Brigade
- Conflicts: World War I; World War II; Battle of Hong Kong

Cedric Wallis (7 March 1896 – 20 October 1982) was a British military officer who served as commander of the Mainland Brigade and East Brigade during the Battle of Hong Kong.

== Early career ==
Wallis was born on 7 March 1896 in Nottingham, England to Arthur Wallis. In 1914, Wallis enlisted as a trooper in the Royal Horse Guards, and was later given commission with the Sherwood Foresters. Wallis then served in France with the East Lancashire Regiment, where he lost his left eye. Wallis thus wore a black patch or a dark monocle over the eye in his later life. In 1917, Wallis joined the Indian Army and served in Iraq. At the end of the First World War, Wallis was made Chief Political Officer in Mosul, before being transferred to southwest Persia, and then to south India and Burma.

== Second World War ==
At the beginning of the Second World War, Wallis commanded an internal security force in Bombay. In 1940, Wallis was moved to Hong Kong, promoted to Brigadier and was given command of 5th Battalion, 7th Rajput Regiment. After Major General Christopher Maltby's arrival in July 1941 as the Commander British Forces in Hong Kong and the arrival of C Force in November, the defensive plans for Hong Kong were redrawn, and Wallis was given command of the "Mainland Brigade" (also known as the "Kowloon Infantry Brigade") consisting of the 5th Battalion 7th Rajput Regiment, the 2nd Battalion Royal Scots and the 2nd Battalion 14th Punjab Regiment. The Canadian Brigadier John K. Lawson was given the command of the "Island Brigade".

=== Battle of Hong Kong ===
Japan invaded Hong Kong on 8 December 1941. As the Japanese advanced through the Kowloon Peninsula, British troops evacuated from the Hong Kong mainland to Hong Kong Island on 12 December and in the early morning of 13 December. As the mainland was lost, the "Mainland Brigade" was rendered impractical. Defensive plans were once again redrawn. On 13 December, Wallis was given command of the "East Brigade" consisting of the Royal Rifles of Canada, 5th Battalion 7th Rajput Regiment, B and D Company of the 1st Battalion Middlesex Regiment and the 1st, 2nd and 3rd Company of the Hong Kong Volunteer Defence Corps, while Lawson commanded the "West Brigade".

On 25 December, Wallis and the East Brigade was fighting in Stanley, Hong Kong. At 01:00, Maltby instructed Wallis and the East Brigade to "hold on to the last". During the day, it was recognized that the situation was untenable, and the British garrison surrendered at 15:30. Orders to surrender was relayed to Wallis at around 20:00, but Wallis, acting in accordance to the 01:00 order, refused to surrender without a written order. After receiving a written order, Wallis and the East Brigade ceased fighting at 02:30 on 26 December, making them the last unit to surrender in the battle.

=== Prisoner of war ===
After his surrender, Wallis was captured by the Japanese. Wallis was previously injured during reconnaissance at Repulse Bay, and after his surrender was sent to Bowen Road Hospital for skin grafts. He was discharged on 11 April and interned at the Sham Shui Po camp. A week later, Wallis was moved to Argyle Street Camp, where he shared a room with Maltby and Col. Lancey Newnham. During his imprisonment, Wallis secretly worked on his war diaries, which he hid in a false bottom of a wooden box he handcrafted himself.

On 4 August 1943, Wallis and Maltby, along with 19 other prisoners, were accused by the Japanese of assisting the British Army Aid Group. They were then transferred to the Shirakawa Camp in Tainan, Taiwan, arriving there on 9 August. In October 1944, they were transferred to Japan and marched to Beppu, before being shipped to south Korea in November. From there they were transported to Manchuria and was kept in the village of Sheng Tai Tun. On 20 May 1945, they were moved to the Mukden camp, where they worked in a factory. Following the surrender of Japan in August 1945, Wallis was moved from Manchuria to Manila. He refused to be flown home, instead insisted in travelling to India to see survivors from his unit, the 7th Rajput Regiment. He was able to visit them in Lucknow before returning to England.

== Later life ==
After his return to England, Wallis received a Mention in Despatches. Wallis submitted his war diaries to the War Office. The war diaries were "highly critical" to the Canadian troops, and included an incident where he considered shooting Canadian officers who wished to surrender, earning Wallis the reputation of "the most controversial soldier in the battle for Hong Kong." Charles Perry Stacey, the official historian of the Canadian Army in the Second World War, opinioned that Canadians who survived the Battle of Hong Kong "assert, pretty universally" that Maltby and Wallis "being in search of scapegoats for the failure of the defence, fixed upon the Canadian battalions for this purpose.” Canadian historian Grant Garneau, in his history of the Royal Rifles of Canada in the battle, noted that Wallis ordered needless counterattacks that produced a high casualty rate.

Wallis later moved to Vancouver, and kept a low profile on his report in hopes of acquiring Canadian citizenship and a Canadian pension. He had difficulties finding a job at first, but later became a successful businessman and business consultant, and retired as a manager of a management placement service. Wallis died on 20 October 1982 in Vancouver General Hospital from cerebral hemorrhage due to atherosclerosis, and was cremated in Vancouver. He was buried in Hamburg, Germany, the hometown of his second wife Ingeborg.

== Family ==
Wallis married Angela Van de Wouwer at St George's, Hanover Square in 1920. They had one daughter, Angela. Wallis later married Ingeborg Subbe, who died in 2010 and was buried in her hometown of Hamburg with her husband.

== Bibliography ==
- Banham, Tony (2009). We Shall Suffer There: Hong Kong's Defenders Imprisoned, 1942-45. Hong Kong: Hong Kong University Press. ISBN 978-988-220-424-9. OCLC 650821754.
- Garneau, Grant (1980). The Royal Rifles of Canada in Hong Kong, 1941-1945. Sawyerville, Quebec: Hong Kong Veterans' Association of Canada, Quebec-Maritimes Branch. ISBN 978-1-894439-05-3. OCLC 26852855.
- Kwong, Chi Man; Tsoi, Yiu Lun (2013). 孤獨前哨: 太平洋戰爭中的香港戰役 [Exposed Outpost: the Battle of Hong Kong in the Pacific War] (in Chinese). Hong Kong: Cosmos Books Ltd. ISBN 9789888254347.
- Lai, Benjamin (2014). Hong Kong, 1941-45: First Strike in the Pacific War. Oxford: Osprey Publishing. ISBN 978-1-78200-270-3. OCLC 881397554.
- Lindsay, Oliver (2005). The Battle for Hong Kong 1941-1945: Hostage to Fortune. Staplehurst: Spellmount. ISBN 978-1-86227-315-3. OCLC 60560990.
- Perras, Galen Roger (2011). "Defeat Still Cries Aloud for Explanation: Explaining C Force's Dispatch to Hong Kong" (PDF). Canadian Military Journal. 11 (4): 37–47. Archived from the original (PDF) on 22 May 2021.
