= Royal Rifles of Canada =

The Royal Rifles of Canada
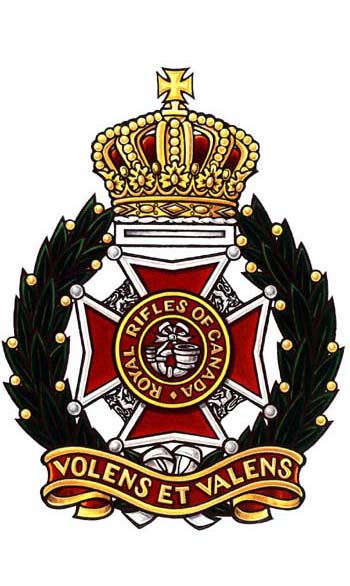
- Active: 28 February 1862 – 1 November 1966
- Country: Canada
- Branch: Canadian Militia (1862–1940); Canadian Army (1940–1966)
- Type: Rifle regiment
- Role: Infantry
- Size: One regiment
- Part of: Non-Permanent Active Militia (1871–1940); Royal Canadian Infantry Corps (1942–1966)
- Garrison/HQ: Quebec City
- Mottos: Volens et valens (Latin for 'willing and capable')
- March: Quick march "I'm Ninety Five", double past "Money Musk"
- Anniversaries: Battle of Hong Kong
- Engagements: South African War; First World War; Second World War
- Battle honours: See #Battle honours

Commanders
- Notable commanders: Brigadier John K. Lawson

The Royal Rifles of Canada was a rifle regiment in the Canadian Army and fought alongside The Winnipeg Grenadiers in the Battle of Hong Kong during World War II. In November 1966, it was reduced to nil strength and placed on the Supplementary Order of Battle. In February 2019, the dormant regiment was amalgamated with the Voltigeurs de Québec.

== Lineage ==
=== The Royal Rifles of Canada ===
The Royal Rifles of Canada originated in Quebec City, Canada East, on 28 February 1862, when the 8th Battalion Volunteer Militia Rifles, Canada, was authorized. It was redesignated the 8th or Stadacona Volunteer Militia Rifles on 28 March 1862; the 8th Battalion "Royal Rifles" on 6 April 1877; the 8th Regiment "Royal Rifles" on 8 May 1900; The Royal Rifles of Canada on 29 March 1920; the 2nd (Reserve) Battalion, The Royal Rifles of Canada on 7 November 1940 and The Royal Rifles of Canada on 1 June 1945. On 22 February 1965, it was amalgamated with Les Voltigeurs de Québec. On 1 November 1966, these two regiments ceased to be amalgamated and the regiment was reduced to nil strength and transferred to the Supplementary Order of Battle. After being a supplementary regiment for more than 52 years, the Royal Rifles amalgamated with the Voltigeurs for the second time, on 22 February 2019. The Voltigeurs inherited the Royal Rifles' heritage, perpetuations and battle honours.

The Sherbrooke Hussars, a present-day Canadian Army Primary Reserve armoured regiment, has the honorary distinction of placing the Royal Rifles' badge and the date 1941 on its guidon. This distinction is not a battle honour, but an acknowledgement that one of its predecessor units, the 7th/11th Hussars, provided about half its effective strength to the Royal Rifles while it was preparing for overseas.

=== Lineage chart ===
Lineage chart

1861
1862
1862
1866
1877
1900
1914	12th Bn, CEF
1915	12th Reserve Infy Bn, CEF
1916
1917
1920	Disbanded
1929
1936
1940	The Royal Rifles of Canada, CASF
1940	1st Bn, The Royal Rifles of Canada, CASF
1941	Destroyed
1942	1st Bn, The Royal Rifles of Canada, CASF
1945	Disbanded
1965
1966
2019

Independent rifle coys
The 8th Bn Volunteer Militia Rifles, Canada
8th or Stadacona Volunteer Militia Rifles
Active service (Note: 8–31 March)
8th Bn "Royal Rifles"
8th Regt "Royal Rifles"
171st "Overseas" Bn, CEF
Absorbed by 20th Reserve Bn
1st Bn (171st Bn, CEF), The Royal Rifles of Canada	2nd Bn, (Note: Reserve) The Royal Rifles of Canada
1st Bn (12th Bn, CEF), The Royal Rifles of Canada	2nd Bn (171st Bn, CEF), The Royal Rifles of Canada
The Royal Rifles of Canada	Disbanded
2nd (Reserve) Bn, The Royal Rifles of Canada
Les Voltigeurs de Québec
The Royal Rifles of Canada
Les Voltigeurs de Québec
The Royal Rifles of Canada (Note: Supplementary Order of Battle)	Les Voltigeurs de Québec
Les Voltigeurs de Québec

== Perpetuations ==
The Royal Rifles of Canada perpetuate the 12th Battalion, CEF and the 171st Battalion (Quebec Rifles), CEF.

== Operational history ==
=== Fenian Raids ===
The 8th Volunteer Militia Rifles were called out on active service on 8 March 1866 in response to the Fenian raids. The battalion, which served in Quebec City, was removed from active service on 31 March 1866.

=== South African War ===
The regiment contributed volunteers for the Canadian contingents in the field, mainly the 2nd (Special Service) Battalion, Royal Canadian Regiment of Infantry.

=== Great War ===
Details of the regiment were placed on active service on 6 August 1914 for local protection duties.

The 12th Battalion, CEF was authorized on 10 August 1914 and embarked for Great Britain on 30 September 1914. It was redesignated as the 12th Reserve Infantry Battalion, CEF on 29 April 1915, to provide reinforcements for the Canadian Corps. The battalion was disbanded on 15 September 1920.

The 171st Battalion (Quebec Rifles), CEF was authorized on 15 July 1916 and embarked for Great Britain on 24 November 1916. Its personnel were absorbed by the 20th Reserve Battalion, CEF on 8 January 1917 to provide reinforcements to the Canadian Corps. The battalion was disbanded on 27 July 1917.

=== Second World War ===
Details from the regiment were called out on service on 26 August 1939 and then placed on active service on 1 September 1939, as The Royal Rifles of Canada, Canadian Active Service Force (Details), for local protection duties. The details called out on active service were disbanded on 31 December 1940. Details of the regiment were again called out on service on 1 January 1941, under the designation Details of 2nd (Reserve) Battalion, The Royal Rifles of Canada. The details were removed from active service on 30 September 1941.

The regiment subsequently mobilized The Royal Rifles of Canada, CASF for active service on 24 May 1940. It was redesignated as the 1st Battalion, The Royal Rifles of Canada, CASF on 7 November 1940. The battalion served in Newfoundland on garrison duty from early November 1940 to August 1941. On 27 October 1941 it embarked for Hong Kong as a part of C Force, where it was destroyed while fighting in defence of the colony. The unit was reconstituted on 10 January 1942. It served in Canada in a home defence role as part of the Vancouver Defences of Pacific Command. On 2 January 1945 it embarked for Great Britain, where it was disbanded on 10 January 1945 to provide reinforcements to the Canadian army in the field.

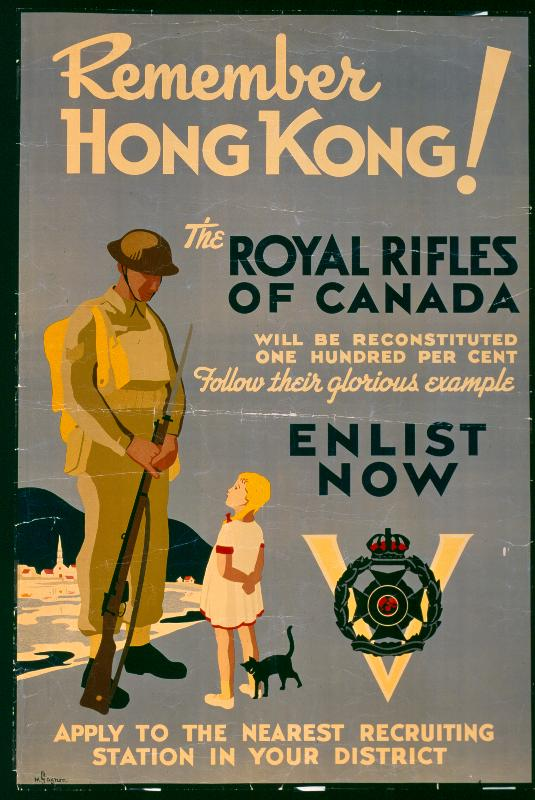
Royal Rifles of Canada recruitment poster in World War II

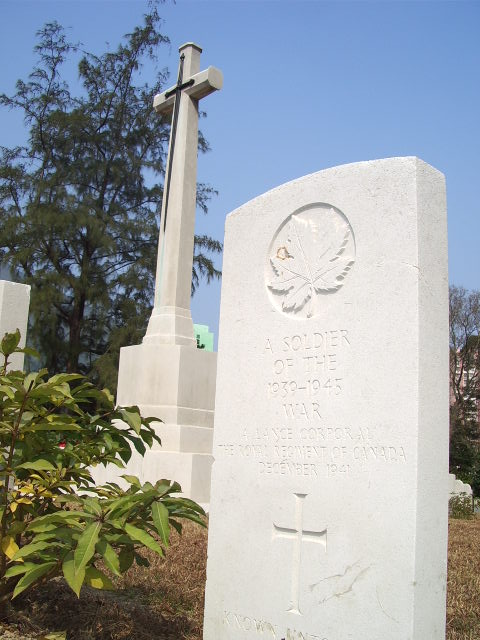
Tombstone of an unknown lance corporal of the Royal Rifles at the Sai Wan War Cemetery, which has been inscribed in error as "Royal Regiment"

== Battle honours ==
Those battle honours in bold type are emblazoned on the regimental accoutrements.

South African War
- **South Africa, 1899–1900**
First World War
- **Ypres, 1915, '17**
- **Festubert, 1915**
- **Mount Sorrel**
- **Somme, 1916**
- **Arras, 1917**
- **Hill 70**
- **Amiens**
Second World War
- Hong Kong
- South-East Asia, 1941

The 7th/11th Hussars contributed about 400 officers and men to the Royal Rifles in 1940 for their operation in Hong Kong. The Sherbrooke Hussars, who incorporate the 7th/11th Hussars, bear the honorary distinction of the badge of the Royal Rifles of Canada, with the year-date 1941, on their guidon.

== Notable members ==
- Major-General Sir David Watson KCB CMG
- Chaplain Frederick George Scott CMG DSO FRSC
- Gander, Newfoundland (dog) canine mascot of the regiment and hero who carried away a hand grenade from wounded members of the unit and later posthumously awarded the Dickin Medal

== See also ==
- Hong Kong Veterans of Canada Association

== Notes and references ==
- Royal Rifles of Canada heritage lost in Armoury fire
