= Voltigeurs de Québec =

Les Voltigeurs de Québec
- Badge of the regiment
- Active: 7 March 1862–present
- Country: Province of Canada (1862–1867); Canada (1867–present)
- Branch: Canadian Army
- Type: Rifles
- Role: Light infantry
- Size: One battalion
- Part of: 35 Canadian Brigade Group
- Garrison/HQ: 805, avenue Wilfrid-Laurier, Québec
- Mottos: Force à superbe mercy à foible (Middle French for 'Violence to the strong, mercy to the weak')
- Colours: None (rifle regiments have no colours)
- March: "Les Voltigeurs de Québec"
- Engagements: Fenian Raids; North-West Rebellion; First World War; Second World War; War in Afghanistan
- Battle honours: See #Battle honours

Commanders
- Current commander: Lieutenant-colonel Bernard Pettigrew
- Honorary colonel: Olivier Desmarais
- Notable commanders: Charles-René-Léonidas d'Irumberry de Salaberry

Les Voltigeurs de Québec (French pronunciation: [le vɔltiʒœʁ də kebɛk]) is a Primary Reserve infantry regiment of the Canadian Forces. It is at the Quebec City Armoury in Quebec City, Quebec, Canada. The name of the regiment commemorates another older French-speaking Canadian militia light infantry unit, the Canadian Voltigeurs (raised in 1812 and disbanded in 1815). The founder of the Canadian Voltigeurs, Lieutenant-Colonel Charles-Michel d'Irumberry de Salaberry, was the father of the two men who raised Les Voltigeurs de Québec. The regiment was formed in March 1862, with its headquarters in Quebec City, by the amalgamation into a regiment of eight independent volunteer militia rifle companies. The first of these companies was originally raised in December 1861. Between 1862 and 1867 these companies were frequently disbanded, reformed and renumbered. In 1942 it provided an armoured regiment.

The regiment has provided soldiers for service with the United Nations and NATO in places like the Golan Heights, Cyprus, the former Yugoslavia, Egypt, Afghanistan, Sierra Leone and Haiti.

== Badge ==
=== Description ===
The arms of Salaberry within an annulus Vert fimbriated and inscribed Voltigeurs de Quebec in capital letters Argent, all surmounting the cross of the Order of St. Louis Argent, the whole ensigned by the Royal Crown proper and above a scroll Argent inscribed with the Motto in capital letters Gules.

=== Symbolism ===
The Crown represents service to the Sovereign. The Voltigeurs Canadiens (1812-1815), who were organized as a temporary British Army regular unit and commanded by Lieutenant-Colonel Charles-Michel d'Irumberry de Salaberry for service during the War of 1812, had the reputation of repeatedly repulsing superior American forces. His son, Lieutenant-Colonel Charles René-Léonidas de Salaberry, was the first commanding officer of the regiment when it was formed in 1862. The badge, incorporating the arms and motto "force à superbe mercy à foible" of the family of d'Irumberry de Salaberry, was adopted in 1892 in recognition of this family's services to the military of Canada and the regiment. The Order of Saint Louis, instituted by King Louis XIV of France in 1693, was a notable honour in New France. "Voltigeurs de Quebec" is a form of the regimental title.

== Lineage ==
=== Les Voltigeurs de Québec ===
Les Voltigeurs de Québec originated in Quebec City, Quebec on 7 March 1862 as The 9th Battalion Volunteer Militia Rifles, Canada (or "'Voltigeurs of Quebec'"). It was redesignated the 9th Regiment Voltigeurs de Québec on 8 May 1900, and, following the Great War, Les Voltigeurs de Québec on 29 March 1920. During the Second World War it was designated the 2nd (Reserve) Battalion, Les Voltigeurs de Québec on 10 May 1941 and Les Voltigeurs de Québec (Reserve) on 15 September 1944. After the Second World War it was designated Les Voltigeurs de Québec (Motor) on 1 April 1946. On 1 September 1954, it was amalgamated with Le Régiment de Québec (Mitrailleuses) and redesignated Les Voltigeurs de Québec (Mitrailleuses). It was redesignated Les Voltigeurs de Québec on 11 April 1958. On 22 February 1965, it was amalgamated with The Royal Rifles of Canada. The two regiments ceased to be amalgamated on 1 November 1966.

=== Royal Rifles of Canada ===
The 8th or Stadacona Volunteer Militia Rifles were founded on 28 February 1862, and became the Royal Rifles of Canada on 29 March 1920. This regiment was relegated to the Supplementary Order of Battle on 1 November 1966 and was amalgamated with the Voltigeurs on 22 February 2019.

=== Le Régiment de Québec ===
Le Régiment de Québec (Mitrailleuses) originated in St. Ambroise on 9 April 1869 as The Provisional Battalion of Quebec. It was redesignated the 87th Quebec Battalion of Infantry on 27 May 1881 and the 87th Quebec Regiment on 8 May 1900. Following the Great War it was redesignated Le Régiment de Québec on 29 March 1920 and Le Régiment de Québec (Mitrailleuses) on 15 December 1936. During the Second World War it was redesignated the 2nd (Reserve) Battalion, Le Régiment de Québec (Mitrailleuses) on 18 March 1942. Following the Second World War it was redesignated Le Régiment de Québec (Mitrailleuses) on 22 December 1945. On 1 September 1954, it was amalgamated with Les Voltigeurs de Québec (Motor).

Lineage chart

1812	6th Bn, Select Embodied Militia	Provincial Corps of Light Infy (Canadian Voltigeurs)	1st and 2nd Bns (City of Quebec)	Beauport Div.
1815	Disbanded	Disbanded	Disbanded	Disbanded
1861	Independent rifle coys	Independent rifle coys
1862	The 8th Bn Volunteer Militia Rifles, Canada	The 9th Bn Volunteer Militia Rifles, Canada (or "Voltigeurs of Quebec")
1862	8th or Stadacona Volunteer Militia Rifles
1866	Active service (Note: March)	Active service
1868	Independent infy coys
1869	The Provisional Bn of "Quebec"
1877	8th Bn "Royal Rifles"
1881	87th "Quebec" Bn of Infy
1885	Active service (Note: April–July)
1900	8th Regt "Royal Rifles"	9th Regt "Voltigeurs de Québec"	87th Quebec Regt
1914	12th Bn, CEF
1915	12th Reserve Infy Bn, CEF	57th "Overseas" Bn, CEF
1916	171st "Overseas" Bn, CEF	Absorbed by 69th "Overseas" Bn
1917	Absorbed by 20th Reserve Bn
1920	Disbanded	1st Bn (41st Bn, CEF), Les Voltigeurs de Québec	1st Bn, Le Rég^{t} de Québec
1920	1st Bn (171st Bn, CEF), The Royal Rifles of Canada	2nd Bn, (Note: Reserve) The Royal Rifles of Canada	1st Bn (57th Bn, CEF), Les Voltigeurs de Québec
1929	1st Bn (12th Bn, CEF), The Royal Rifles of Canada	2nd Bn (171st Bn, CEF), The Royal Rifles of Canada
1936	The Royal Rifles of Canada	Disbanded	Les Voltigeurs de Québec	Le Rég^{t} de Québec (Mitrailleuses)
1940	The Royal Rifles of Canada, CASF	2nd (Reserve) Bn, The Royal Rifles of Canada
1940	1st Bn, The Royal Rifles of Canada, CASF
1941	Destroyed	1st Bn, Les Voltigeurs de Québec, CASF	2nd (Reserve) Bn, Les Voltigeurs de Québec
1942	1st Bn, The Royal Rifles of Canada, CASF	24th Army Tank Bn (Les Voltigeurs de Québec), CAC, CASF	1st Bn, Le Rég^{t} de Québec, CASF	2nd (Reserve) Bn, Le Rég^{t} de Québec (Mitrailleuses)
1942	24th Recce Bn (Les Voltigeurs de Québec), CAC, CASF
1942	24th Recce Regt (Les Voltigeurs de Québec), CAC, CASF
1943	1st Bn, Les Voltigeurs de Québec, CASF
1943	Disbanded
1944	Les Voltigeurs de Québec (Reserve)
1945	Disbanded	The Royal Rifles of Canada	Disbanded	Le Rég^{t} de Québec (Mitrailleuses)
1946	Les Voltigeurs de Québec (Motor)
1954	Les Voltigeurs de Québec (Mitrailleuses)
1958	Les Voltigeurs de Québec
1965	Les Voltigeurs de Québec
1966	The Royal Rifles of Canada (Note: Supplementary Order of Battle)	Les Voltigeurs de Québec
2012	Perpetuates War of 1812 units
2019	Les Voltigeurs de Québec

Regimental camp flag

== Perpetuations ==
War of 1812: Les Voltigeurs de Québec perpetuate the Provincial Corps of Light Infantry (Canadian Voltigeurs), the 1st and 2nd Battalions (City of Quebec) (1812–1815), the Beauport Division (1812–1815) and the 6th Battalion, Select Embodied Militia.

The Great War: The regiment perpetuates the 12th Battalion, CEF, 57th Battalion (Canadien-Français), CEF, and 171st Battalion (Quebec Rifles), CEF'

== Operational history ==
=== The Fenian Raids ===
The Voltigeurs of Quebec were called out on active service on 8 March 1866, remaining on active service until 31 March 1866.

=== The North West Rebellion ===
Les Voltigeurs de Québec were mobilized for active service on 10 April 1885, and served in the Alberta Column of the North West Field Force. The battalion was removed from active service on 24 July 1885.

=== The Great War ===
The 9th Regiment Voltigeurs de Québec and details of the 87th Quebec Regiment were placed on active service on 6 August 1914 for local protection duties.

The 12th Battalion, CEF, was authorized on 10 August 1914 and embarked for Great Britain on 30 September 1914. It was redesignated as the 12th Reserve Infantry Battalion, CEF on 29 April 1915, to provide reinforcements for the Canadian Corps. The battalion was disbanded on 15 September 1920.

The 57^{e} Bataillon (Canadien-Français), CEF, was authorized on 20 April 1915 and embarked for Britain on 2 June 1916, where on 8 June 1916, its personnel were absorbed by the 69th Battalion (Canadien-Français), CEF, to provide reinforcements to the Canadian Corps in the field. The battalion was disbanded on 11 April 1918.

The 171st Battalion (Quebec Rifles), CEF, was authorized on 15 July 1916 and embarked for Great Britain on 24 November 1916. Its personnel were absorbed by the 20th Reserve Battalion on 8 January 1917 to provide reinforcements to the Canadian Corps. The battalion was disbanded on 27 July 1917.

=== The Second World War ===
Details of Les Voltigeurs de Québec and details of Le Régiment de Québec were called out on service on 26 August 1939 and then placed on active service on 1 September 1939, as Les Voltigeurs de Québec, CASF (Details) and Le Régiment de Québec (Mitrailleuses), CASF (Details), for local protection duties. These details were disbanded on 31 December 1940. Details of Les Voltigeurs were again called out on service on 1 January 1941, as Details of 1st (Reserve) Battalion, Les Voltigeurs de Québec, and were disbanded on 5 April 1941.

The regiment mobilized the 1st Battalion, Les Voltigeurs de Québec, CASF, on 10 May 1941. It was converted to armour and redesignated the 24th Army Tank Battalion (Les Voltigeurs de Québec), CAC, CASF, on 26 January 1942. It was redesignated the 24th Reconnaissance Battalion (Les Voltigeurs de Québec), CAC, CASF, on 22 May 1942 and the 24th Reconnaissance Regiment (Les Voltigeurs de Québec), CAC, CASF, on 8 June 1942. On 16 January 1943, it was reconverted to infantry and redesignated the 1st Battalion, Les Voltigeurs de Québec, CASF. It served in Canada in a home defence role as part of the 17th Infantry Brigade, 7th Canadian Infantry Division. It embarked for Britain on 23 July 1943, where it provided reinforcements to units of the Canadian Corps in the field until it was disbanded on 1 November 1943.

Details of Le Régiment de Québec were called out on service on 26 August 1939 and then placed on active service on 1 September 1939, under the designation Le Régiment de Québec (Mitrailleuses), CASF (Details), for local protection duties.41 The details called out on active service were disbanded on 31 December 1940. The regiment subsequently mobilized the 1st Battalion, Le Régiment de Québec, CASF, on 18 March 1942. This unit served in Canada and in a home defence role as part of the 15th Infantry Brigade, 7th Canadian Infantry Division and in Newfoundland on garrison duty. The battalion was disbanded on 22 December 1945 following the cessation of hostilities.

=== Afghanistan ===
The regiment contributed volunteers to the various task forces that served in Afghanistan from 2002 to 2014.

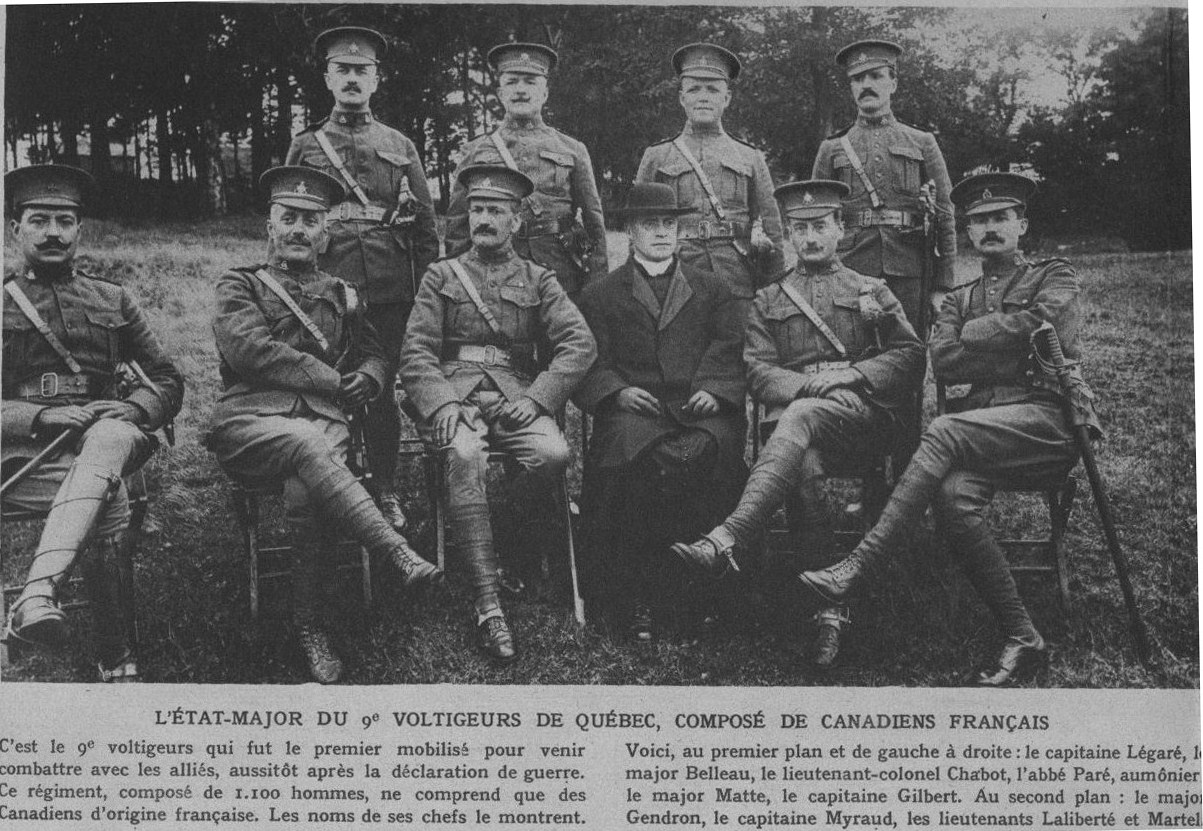
1914

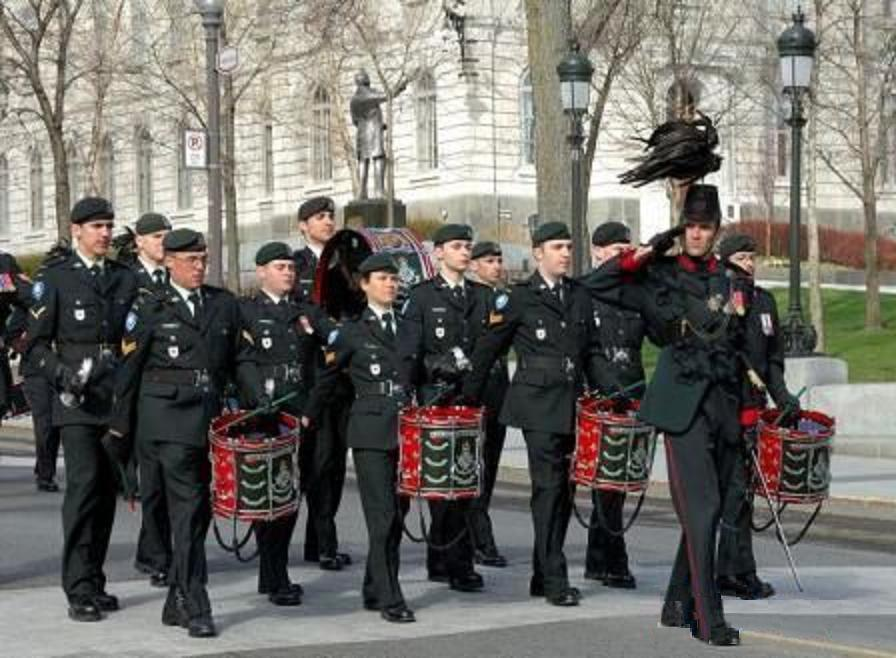
La Musique des Voltigeurs de Québec at the Quebec City International Festival of Military Bands in August 2012.

== Fire ==
During the night of April 4, 2008, the Quebec City Armoury, (formerly Grande-Allée Armoury (French: Manège militaire Grande-Allée)), built in 1887, was destroyed during a fire. In October 2008, regimental institutions and their insurance firm started a lawsuit against the Department of National Defence, for damages, blaming negligence on the part of the government for failing to let the insurance firm personnel inspect the site after the fire. In November 2012, the Government of Canada announced that the armoury would be rebuilt and would remain the historic home of the regiment. The re-built armoury was scheduled to be completed by 2017 and was reopened on 12 May 2018, with the ceremonial reopening presided by the Prime Minister of Canada, Justin Trudeau, who was the reviewing officer and keynote speaker.

== Battle honours ==
War of 1812
- Defence of Canada – 1812–1815 – Défense du Canada
- Châteauguay
- Crysler's Farm

Non-emblazonable honorary distinction Defence of Canada – 1812–1815 – Défense du Canada

North West Rebellion
North West Canada, 1885
South African War
South Africa, 1899–1900
First World War
- Ypres, 1915, '17
- Festubert, 1915
- Mount Sorrel
- Somme, 1916
- Arras, 1917
- Hill 70
- Amiens
Second World War
- Hong Kong
- South-East Asia, 1941
Honorary distinction: Second World War badge of the Royal 22^{e} Régiment for significantly reinforcing the regiment during the Italian campaign. Although authorized, this cap badge has not been added to the regimental appointments.
South-West Asia
Afghanistan

== Les Voltigeurs de Québec museum ==
Les Voltigeurs de Québec museum
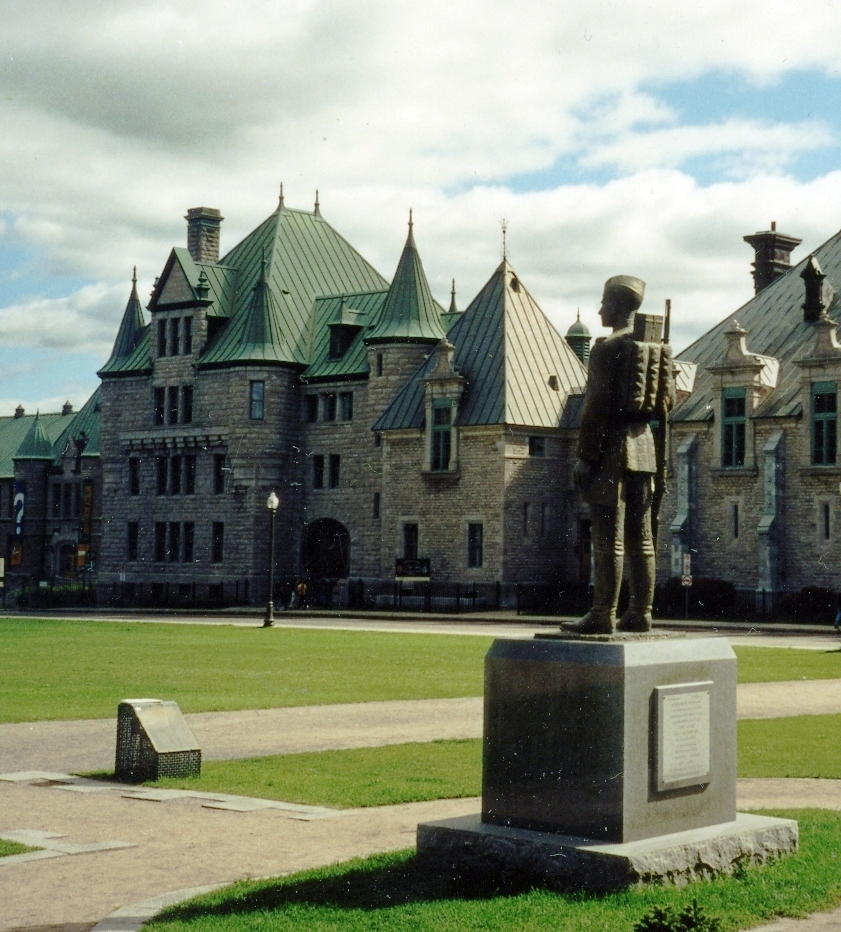
- Location: Grande-Allée Armoury, 805 Wilfrid-Laurier Avenue East, Quebec City
- Type: Regimental museum

The museum fosters greater awareness among general public of the regiment's history and traditions. The museum illustrates the military history of the Voltigeurs de Québec, the Royal Rifles of Canada and the Régiment de Québec, using artifacts, uniforms, photographs and documents. The museum displays military uniforms, weapons, equipment, medals, private badge collections, scale models, trophies and war memorabilia loaned by Regimental veterans and supporters of the museum.

== Legacy ==
The Royal Canadian Mint issued a 5-cent silver proof coin celebrating Les Voltigeurs de Québec in 2000; the coin features a baton, drums, and a sash of the Regimental Insignia of Les Voltigeurs de Québec.

== Affiliation ==
- HMCS Ville de Québec (FFH 332)
- The Royal Yorkshire Regiment (14th/15th, 19th and 33rd/76th Foot). - Les voltigeurs were allied to The Duke of Wellington's Regiment (DWR) and The Prince of Wales's Own Regiment of Yorkshire (PWO) prior to the 2006 merger of the PWO, Green Howards and DWR into The new Yorkshire Regiment.
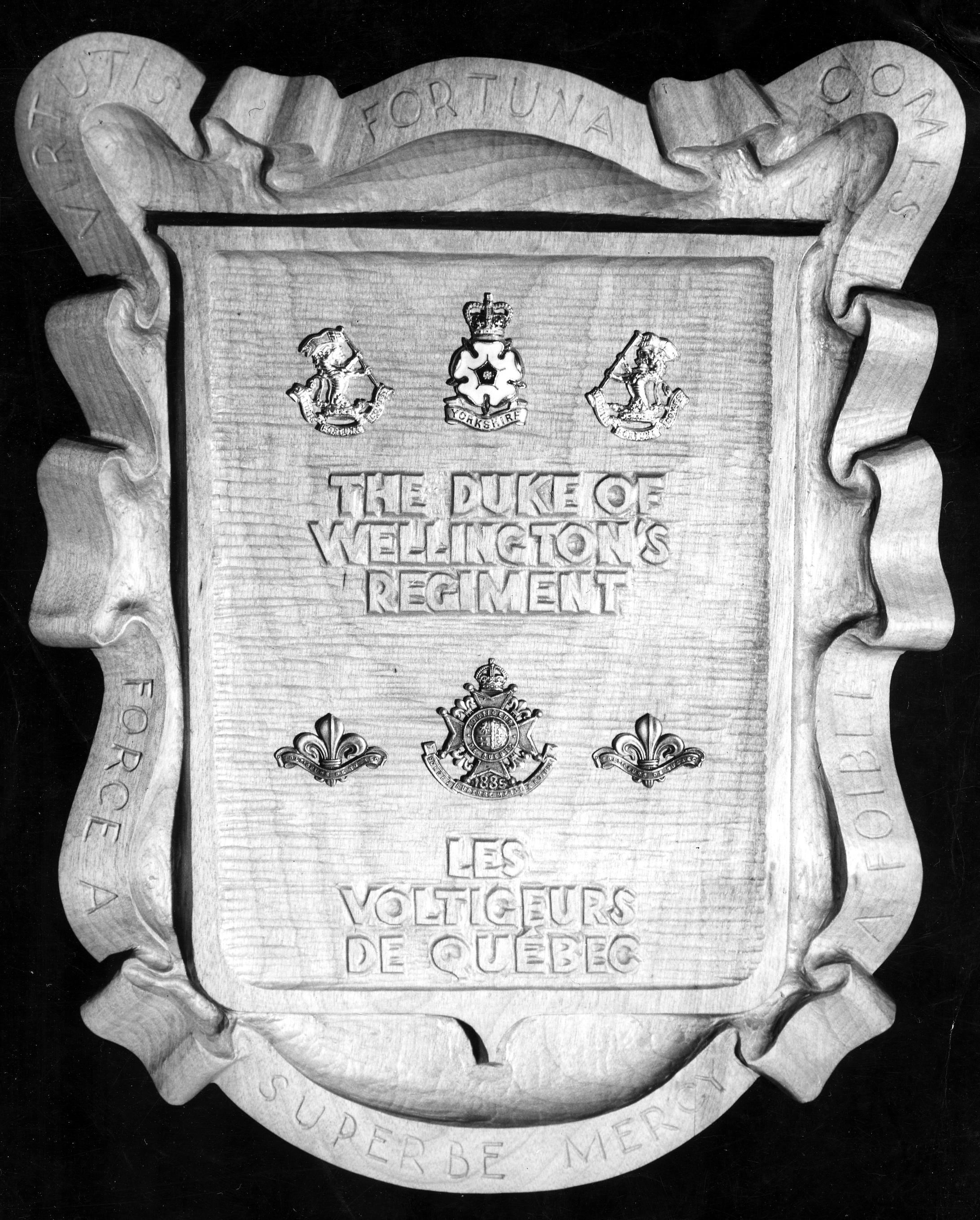
Historical plaque showing regimental alliance to The DWR

== Order of precedence ==
Preceded by The Black Watch (Royal Highland Regiment) of Canada	Les Voltigeurs de Québec	Succeeded by The Royal Regiment of Canada

== Bibliography ==
- Les Voltigeurs De Québec : Premier Régiment Canadien-Français by Jacques Castonguay (1987).
