= 57th Battalion (Canadien-Français), CEF =

Canadian infantry battalion

57th "Overseas" Battalion, CEF
- Active: 1915–1916
- Country: Canada
- Branch: Canadian Expeditionary Force
- Type: Infantry
- Mobilization headquarters: Quebec City
- Battle honours: The Great War, 1916

Commanders
- Current commander: Maj A.L.H. Renaud
- Ceremonial chief: LCol Étienne Théodore Paquet

The 57th Battalion (Canadien-Français), CEF (French, 57^{e} Bataillon (Canadien-Français), CEF) was an infantry battalion of the Canadian Expeditionary Force during the Great War. The 57th Battalion was authorized on 20 April 1915 and embarked for Britain on 2 June 1916. On 8 June 1916, its personnel were absorbed by the 69th Battalion, CEF to provide reinforcements to the Canadian Corps in the field. The battalion was disbanded on 11 April 1918.

The 57th Battalion recruited in and was mobilized at Quebec City.

The 57th Battalion had two commanding officers:

- Major A.L.H. Renaud
- Lieutenant-Colonel Étienne Théodore Paquet

The 57th Battalion was awarded the battle honour "The Great War, 1916".

On 29 March 1920, the perpetuation of the 57th Battalion was assigned to the 1st Battalion (57th Battalion, CEF), Les Francs-tireurs du Saguenay. However, a few months later, the perpetuation was reassigned on 15 June to the 1st Battalion (57th Battalion, CEF), Les Voltigeurs de Québec.

== Sources ==
Canadian Expeditionary Force 1914-1919 by Col. G.W.L. Nicholson, CD, Queen's Printer, Ottawa, Ontario, 1962
