= HMT Awatea =

New Zealand ocean liner, troop ship

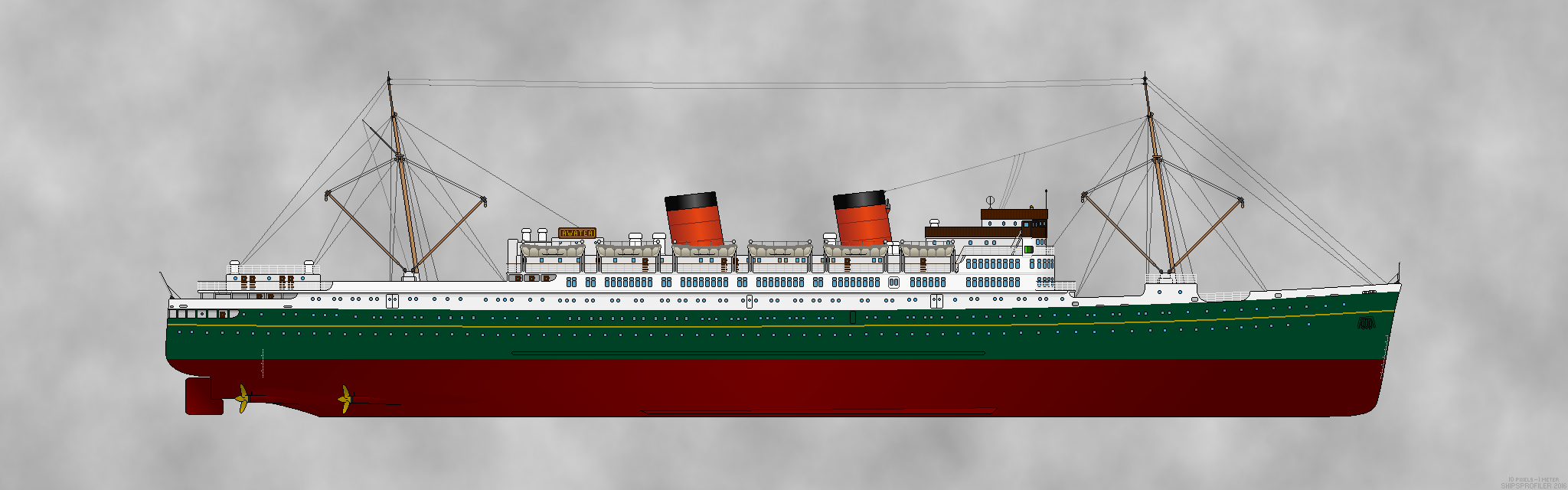
- Awatea in her civilian colours

History

New Zealand
- Name: Awatea
- Namesake: Māori for "eye of the dawn"
- Owner: Union Steam Ship Co of NZ
- Operator: 1936–39: Union SS Co of NZ; 1939–42: (United Kingdom) Royal Navy
- Port of registry: Wellington
- Route: Wellington / Auckland – Sydney
- Ordered: 1935
- Builder: Vickers-Armstrongs, Barrow
- Yard number: 707
- Laid down: 1935
- Launched: 25 February 1936
- Completed: July 1936
- Maiden voyage: 5 August 1936
- Reclassified: 1939, as troopship
- Identification: UK official number 157650; Call sign ZMBJ
- Fate: Sunk by aircraft, November 1942

General characteristics
- Type: Ocean liner
- Tonnage: 13,482 GRT, 7,929 NRT
- Length: 527.3 ft (160.7 m)
- Beam: 74.2 ft (22.6 m)
- Draught: 25 ft 6 in (7.8 m)
- Depth: 41.7 ft (12.7 m)
- Decks: 3
- Installed power: 4,608 NHP
- Propulsion: 2 × steam turbines; 2 × screws
- Speed: 22 knots (41 km/h)
- Sensors & processing systems: wireless direction finding; echo sounding device; gyrocompass

Twin Screw Steamer Awatea was a trans-Tasman steam ocean liner built for the Union Steam Ship Company of New Zealand that was launched in 1936. From 1937 until 1939 she linked Wellington and Auckland in New Zealand with Sydney in Australia.

In 1939 she was converted into a Royal Navy troopship. In 1941 she took Canadian troops C Force to Hong Kong, 22 days before the Battle of Hong Kong broke out. In 1942 she took part in Operation Torch, the Allied invasion of Vichy French North Africa, where she was sunk by enemy aircraft.

Awatea is a Māori word meaning "eye of the dawn".

== Ocean liner ==
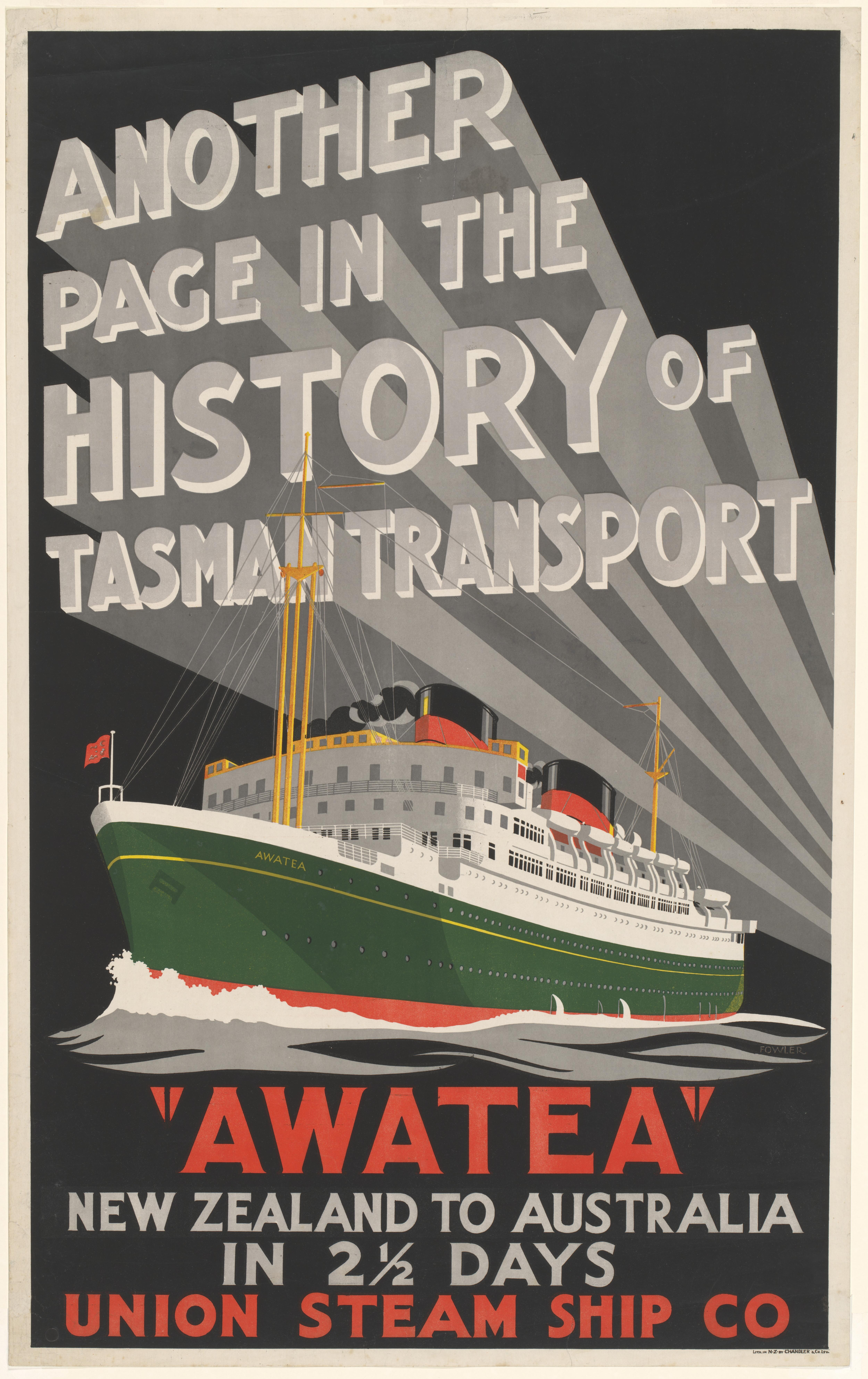
Poster advertising Awatea

Vickers-Armstrongs built Awatea at Barrow-in-Furness in England, launching her on 25 February 1936 and completing her that July. She had two screws driven by six steam turbines via single reduction gearing. Their combined power of 4,608 NHP gave her a service speed of 22 knots (41 km/h). On one trans-Tasman voyage she averaged 23.35 knots (43.24 km/h) over a distance of 576 nautical miles (1,067 km).

On 5 August 1936 Awatea left Britain on her maiden voyage to New Zealand, sailing via the Panama Canal. She began her trans-Tasman passenger service on 15 September 1936 when she left Wellington for Sydney. On 22 August 1939 she was taken out of service in Sydney for her annual survey. That December she was requisitioned by the Royal Navy as a troopship.

== Service in World War II ==
One of the Awatea's first tasks was to transport members of the C Force, a force created by the Government of Canada to protect its interests in Hong Kong against the threat of Japanese invasion. Awatea and HMCS Prince Robert picked up the troops in Vancouver on 27 October 1941, and landed them in Hong Kong on 16 November, 22 days before the Battle of Hong Kong broke out.

She was ordered to deliver No. 6 Commando to North Africa for Operation Torch in November 1942, to defeat Vichy French forces. She completed her landing successfully, although the landing for No. 6. Commando had some major problems.

The first problem was the inexperience of the crew at launching landing craft, which caused the landing to be two hours late and the last wave of troops to arrive at 6:30 am, with most of the landing off target by up to several miles.

As she was leaving on 11 November 1942, an unknown number of aircraft from Luftwaffe Kampfgeschwader 77 attacked her. They bombed and strafed her, but her crew returned fire. Two torpedoes hit her port side, and a bomb hit her deck but did not explode. But the torpedoes started a fire, which reached and detonated the unexploded bomb. Several near-misses blasted apart most of her first-class accommodation. At this point the crew abandoned ship, which was later sunk by the same aircraft. The admiral of her fleet said "she fought the battle of a battleship" as a tribute to her.
