= C Force =

Brigade of the Canadian Army

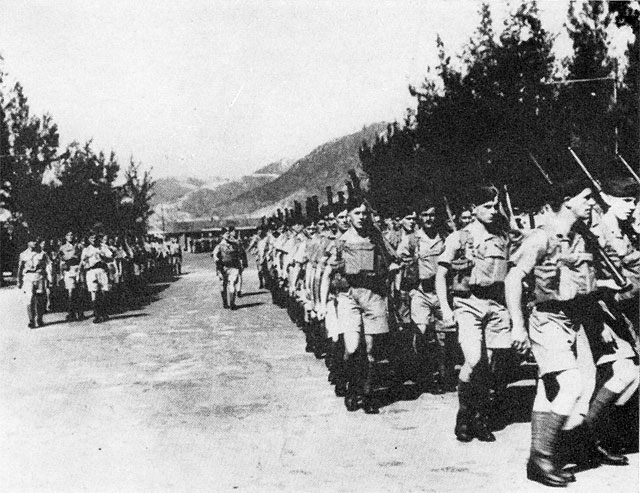
- The Winnipeg Grenadiers arrive in Hong Kong as part of C Force.
- Active: 1941
- Country: Canada
- Branch: Canadian Army
- Type: Composite force
- Role: Garrison
- Size: 1,975 personnel
- Part of: Hong Kong Garrison
- Garrison/HQ: Hong Kong
- Engagements: Battle of Hong Kong

Commanders
- Notable commanders: John K. Lawson

"C" Force was the Canadian military contingent involved in the Battle of Hong Kong in December 1941. Members of this force were the first Canadian soldiers to see action against Japan in World War II. The major Canadian units involved in the defence of Hong Kong were the Winnipeg Grenadiers and the Royal Rifles of Canada. In addition to this the Canadians provided a Brigade HQ.

== Deterrence Diplomacy ==
During the course of 1941, Japan's foreign policy assumed an increasingly aggressive posture towards the Western powers. In July 1941, Japan occupied the southern half of French Indochina, leading the United States, Great Britain, and the Dutch government in exile which controlled the oil-rich Netherlands East Indies (modern Indonesia) to impose an oil embargo on Japan. As Japan possessed no oil, the embargo threatened to shut down the Japanese economy once its oil reserves were exhausted. Talks were opened to find a solution to the crisis, but it was understood that there was a very real possibility that Japan might try to seize the Netherlands East Indies together with the British colonies of Sarawak, Sabah, Malaya, and Burma to provide itself with oil, as proven by the subsequent occupations of the Japanese Army.

The British response was a policy of "deterrence diplomacy", building up British forces in Asia to deter the Japanese from choosing war and to encourage Tokyo to continue seeking a diplomatic solution to the crisis. As part of the same strategy, Force Z, a force consisting of one battleship, one battlecruiser, and three destroyers, was ordered to Singapore to provide a deterrent. A major problem with the British "deterrence diplomacy" was that in 1941, Britain was fully engaged in war with Germany and Italy, and it was not possible to build up the level of forces in Asia that could truly deter the Japanese. In a memo, Major-General Arthur Grasett (the outgoing Commander of British Troops in China, and a Canadian himself) argued that increasing the size of the Hong Kong garrison would have "a strong psychological stimulus" and a "salutary effect on the Japanese". Grasett's memo stated that an extra two battalions could be "found" in Canada, though he also noted that any "troops supplied by Canada would be practically untrained".

Since the purpose of the Canadian troops in Hong Kong would be to deter the Japanese, not actually fight them, Grasett argued that this would not matter. Grasett's memo was endorsed by the Foreign Secretary, Anthony Eden. In a memo to the Prime Minister Winston Churchill, on 12 September 1941, Eden called Japan an overrated power that would back down if confronted with sufficient British power and approved of sending two Canadian battalions to Hong Kong as the best way to "keep up the pressure". As Churchill had stated he would only make the request to the Canadian government if Eden gave his approval first, Eden's statement that he and the other Foreign Office experts all believed that Japan would be less likely to choose war if faced with a stronger Hong Kong garrison was decisive in winning his support.

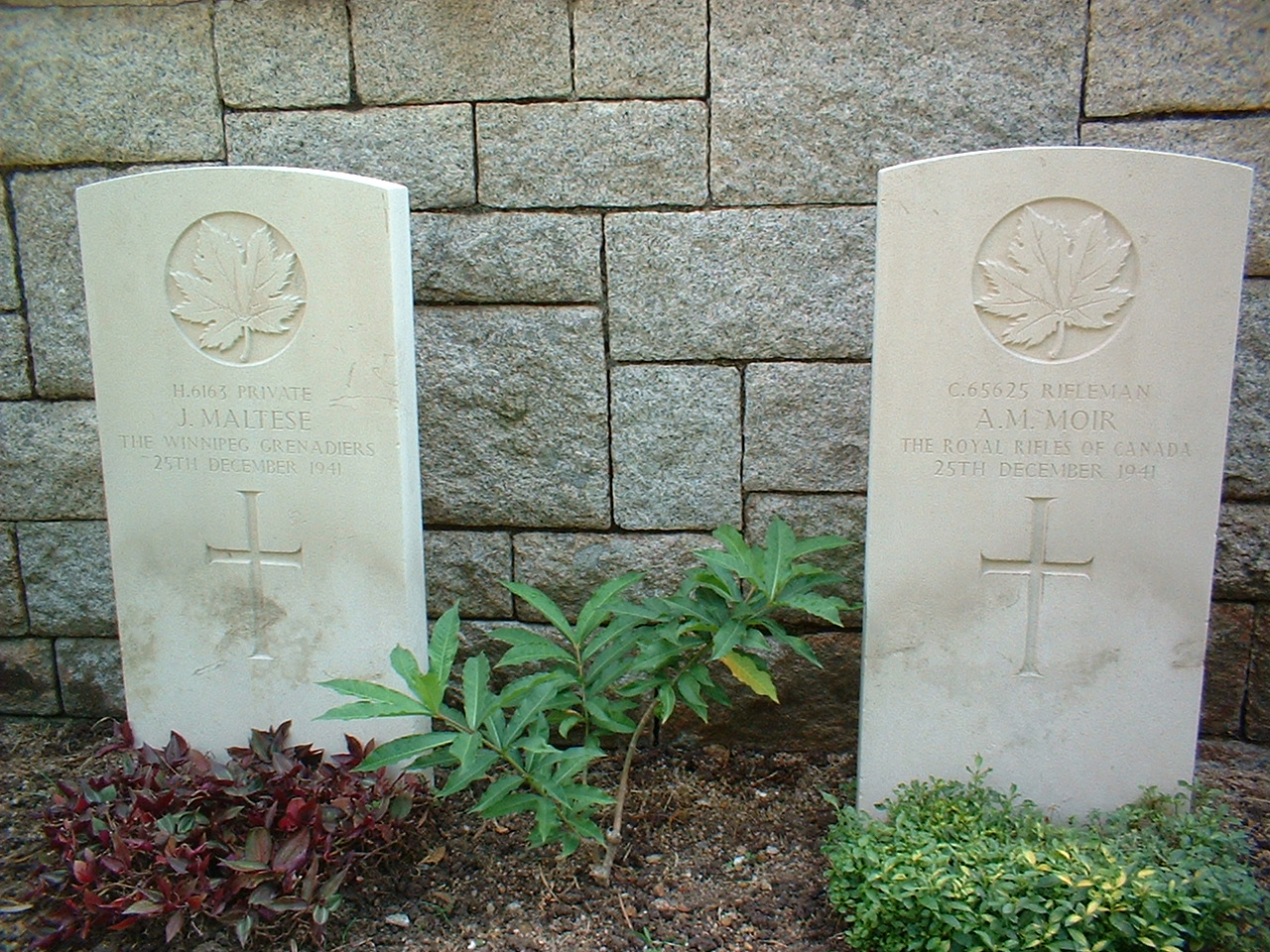
The graves of Pvt J. Maltese of the Winnipeg Grenadiers and Rifleman A. M. Moir of the Royal Rifles of Canada. A battalion from each regiment was sent to Hong Kong in November 1941, just three weeks before the Japanese invasion. The Canadian contingent was commonly known as "C" Force.

Ever since the Sino-Japanese war began in 1937, Britain had leaned towards pro-Chinese neutrality, assisting China under the belief that it was better to keep Japan bogged down in China to ensure that Japan did not attack the Dominions of Australia and New Zealand, along with Britain's Asian colonies. The British historian Victor Rothwell wrote: "In the middle 1930s, if China had a Western friend, it was Britain. In 1935–36 Britain gave China real help with its finances and showed real concern about Japanese encroachments in north China. Realizing that the only hope of inducing Japan to moderate these activities lay in an Anglo-American joint front, Britain proposed that a number of times, but was always rebuffed by Washington".

From time to time, the Chinese leader Chiang Kai-shek hinted that he might be willing to make peace with Japan. Given the crisis caused by the oil embargo, the Foreign Office in London felt it was imperative to keep China fighting and viewed reinforcing the Hong Kong garrison as a symbol of support for China. As the British Army was fully involved in the campaigns in North Africa and the Horn of Africa, a request was made on 19 September 1941 to have Canada provide two battalions to Hong Kong. The British request of 19 September stated that "there have been signs of a certain weakening of Japan's attitude towards us" and argued that sending two battalions to Hong Kong would "have a very strong moral effect on the whole of the Far East".

In Ottawa, the Department of National Defence had neither a map of Hong Kong nor any accurate information to provide the basis for decisions. The Minister of National Defence, Colonel John Ralston, was visiting the United States at the time of the request, and the acting Defence Minister was Major Charles "Chubby" Power. Power had won the Military Cross in World War One, but the primary reason for his appointment as associate defence minister was because of his influence and popularity in his native Quebec. Power was an affable and bilingual Irish-Canadian from Quebec City whose Catholicism, skill as a hockey player, and sympathy for French-Canadian sentiments had established him as a leading spokesman for Quebec. Hence his appointment as associate defence minister, even though, as the Canadian historian Brereton Greenhous noted sourly, Power was not known for "the keenness of his intellect".

The Canadian prime minister, William Lyon Mackenzie King, privately considered Power to be a mental lightweight and kept him in the cabinet only because he was very popular in Quebec. In turn, Power consulted General Harry Crerar, the Chief of the General Staff, who favoured approving the request. Many of the officers in the Royal Rifles of Canada's active battalion were relatives or friends of the Power clan of Quebec City, and Power's own son Francis was serving as a subaltern in the Royal Rifles. In 1940–1941, the Royal Rifles had served in the British colony of Newfoundland, charged with protecting it against the unlikely prospect of a German invasion. For many officers in the Royal Rifles, being transferred from guarding the cold, fog-shrouded shores of Newfoundland to guarding the warm, tropical city of Hong Kong was a highly pleasing prospect. The Royal Rifles were tasked with guarding the Newfoundland Railway and the Gander airport, both of which were considered unglamorous duties.

In September 1941, Major J.H. Price, the son of a Quebec lumber baron who was serving in the Royal Rifles, wrote to Power saying, "With the interest you have in our welfare, you will be willing and able to convince military authorities that it is bad policy to keep a unit like ours killing time". Power, in his reply to Price, stated that he "made inquiries" about sending the Royal Rifles overseas and now had "some hope that events overseas may soon develop to the point where it is possible for your lot to have the opportunity it deserves". The matter was first discussed at the Cabinet on 23 September 1941, with Power advocating for acceptance of the request. Mackenzie King agreed, provided that Ralston also gave his approval. Ralston was still in the United States and, from his hotel in Los Angeles, telephoned Crerar for his advice and learned that he still favoured acceptance. Crerar then submitted a memo to the cabinet stating his professional opinion as a soldier, asserting that there was "no military risk" to sending a force to Hong Kong, as he optimistically concluded that sending two battalions to Hong Kong would deter Japan from war.

Largely for domestic political reasons, the Liberal Mackenzie King accepted the request on 29 September 1941. In 1917, the issue of conscription caused the Liberal Party to split between its English-Canadian wing, which supported conscription, and its French-Canadian wing, which opposed conscription. In 1917, the Canadian Corps had taken such heavy losses that the government of Robert Borden had the stark choice of either pulling the Canadian Corps out of action, which was tantamount to dropping out of the war, or bringing in conscription to provide sufficient manpower to keep the Canadian Corps fighting. By opting for the second option, it led to the Conscription Crisis of 1917, which posed the gravest threat to national unity yet seen, as the policy of conscription led to the first demands that Quebec secede from Canada. Mackenzie King was determined that in the Second World War, his Liberal Party would not be likewise broken into two by the conscription issue as it had been in 1917.

Mackenzie King seems to have genuinely believed that if his government followed the same policies that Borden had in 1917–1918, it would cause a civil war. To avoid dealing with the issue of conscription, Mackenzie King tried to keep the Canadian Army from seeing action, reasoning that if the Army fought no battles, it would take no losses, and thus there would be no need for conscription. For much of the Second World War, King preferred to limit Canada's contributions to the war to the struggle in the air and on the sea as the best way to avoid the level of casualties that would lead to demands for overseas conscription. By 1941, the fact that after two years of war, the Canadian Army had not seen action once, while the armies of the other nations of the "Commonwealth family" had all seen extensive action, leading to domestic criticism of Mackenzie King.

By September 1941, many English-Canadian politicians and journalists were starting to display signs of jealousy as soldiers from Britain, Australia, and New Zealand got all the glory of fighting the Axis forces in the Mediterranean while the Canadians sat on the sidelines in Britain, leading to demands that Mackenzie King dispatch Canadian troops to Egypt, which he stoutly resisted. Mackenzie King's adamant refusal to send the Canadian Army into action by 1941 was hurting morale, as many soldiers complained that it was the airmen of the Royal Canadian Air Force who were getting all the glory while they were forced to engage in endless training for battles that the prime minister would not allow them to fight. By the fall of 1941, Mackenzie King's nemesis, Arthur Meighen, was campaigning for the leadership of the Conservative Party on a platform of "Total War", accusing Mackenzie King of being lackluster in his commitment towards winning the war.

Mackenzie King agreed to send C Force to Hong Kong because it allowed him to claim that his government was supporting Britain. At the same time, since the purpose of C Force was to deter the Japanese from invading Hong Kong, it seemed to promise there would be no losses in combat. Crerar's memo, claiming that there was "no military risk," had considerable influence on Mackenzie King, who believed that C Force would only be performing guard duty in Hong Kong. Additionally, the assertion that C Force would deter Japan from going to war enabled Mackenzie King to assert that Canada was playing an important role in protecting the British Empire, which helped him resist the pressure to send Canadian troops to fight in Egypt. Mackenzie King appears to have either been unaware or did not care that Crerar, a bureaucratic general who had never seen action, had an "authoritarian submissive" personality and tended to say whatever his superiors wanted to hear.

== Into Hong Kong ==
In autumn 1941, the British government accepted the Canadian government's offer, mediated by Major-General Grasett, a former general officer commanding in Hong Kong and Canadian, to send two infantry battalions (1,975 personnel) to reinforce the Hong Kong garrison. At that time, war with Japan was not considered imminent, and it was expected that these battalions would see only garrison (non-combat) duty. The Canadian Army's classification of units was divided into three classes, with Class A at the top and Class C at the bottom. The two battalions selected by Crerar were both Class C units, evaluated at the lowest level of fitness for combat. The first unit chosen by Crerar was the Royal Rifles of Canada, selected primarily because of lobbying by Associate Defence Minister Power, who insisted that the Royal Rifles, full of his relatives and friends, go to Hong Kong. Mackenzie King's diary mentions in passing in December 1941 that "it was Power himself who was keenest on having the Quebec regiment [the Royal Rifles] go, he mentioning at the time that his own son was a member of it."

The commander of the Royal Rifles, W.J. Home, was a First World War veteran who had won the Military Cross and served as a Permanent Force officer in the interwar period. Shortly before World War Two began in 1939, Home had been dismissed from the Royal Canadian Regiment as "unfit for command", but was given the command of the Royal Rifles in September 1939 due to the lack of experienced officers. Having selected one Class C unit to go to Hong Kong, Crerar felt the pressure to choose another Class C unit to avoid accusations of favouritism. He chose the Winnipeg Grenadiers entirely to maintain the appearance of regional parity, as he mentioned in a letter to Ralston that having selected one Class C unit from eastern Canada, he wanted another Class C unit from western Canada to go overseas. Additionally, having selected a unit from Quebec that was 35–40% French-Canadian, Crerar wanted an English-Canadian Class C unit to go to Hong Kong in order to make the political point that English-Canadians and French-Canadians could work together. The commander of the Winnipeg Grenadiers was Lt. Col. John Sutcliffe (29 August 1898, Elland, England – 6 April 1942, Hong Kong), who had seen action in France, Belgium, Russia, Persia, and Mesopotamia (Iraq) during the First World War.

Crerar selected Brigadier-General John K. Lawson to command C Force. Lawson, formerly the director of military training, had seen action in World War One but had never commanded a unit higher than a company. Since both battalions were graded unfit for combat, it was felt that Lawson was best qualified to raise their level of training. Lawson's headquarters picked up volunteers as it made its way across Canada to Vancouver, coming to comprise 83 men, most of whom were signallers and clerks. On 18 October 1941, the Japanese prime minister, Prince Konoye, resigned and was replaced by his War Minister, General Tojo Hideki. Prince Konoye had triggered the crisis by ordering the occupation of French Indochina and then attempted to resolve the crisis he had caused via talks to end the oil embargo. The sacking of Prince Konoye and his replacement as prime minister with a general known for his hardline views was intended as a signal that Japan was seriously contemplating war. The Royal Rifles left Quebec City on 23 October, and the Winnipeg Grenadiers left Winnipeg on 25 October.

All of the men of C Force were volunteers. The force, under the command of Lawson departed Vancouver on 27 October and arrived in Hong Kong on 16 November. The New Zealand ship that had been contracted to carry C Force, HMT Awatea, was a troopship, not a freighter as expected, so C Force was forced to leave behind most of its vehicles and heavy equipment. Only 20 of the 212 vehicles allotted to C Force were carried by the Awatea, with the rest left behind on the Vancouver docks. The equipment and vehicles left behind in Vancouver were supposed to be picked up by another ship, but the Canadian government had still not chartered a ship by the time Japan invaded Hong Kong. Owing to a lack of space, one company of the Royal Rifles had to sail aboard the merchant cruiser assigned to guard the Awatea, HMCS Prince Robert. Unknown to C Force, on 5 November 1941, the Japanese cabinet in Tokyo approved the final plans for war and the final offers in the negotiations to end the oil embargo.

The same day, Lieutenant-General Sakai Takashi was appointed to take command of the Japanese 23rd Army, with orders to move the 38th Division to the territory just outside of Hong Kong and to finalize the plans for taking Hong Kong. On 15 November 1941, the cabinet recommended to the Emperor that Japan go to war. During the voyage across the Pacific, the men of C Force were instructed for the first time on how to use mortars, Bren guns, and grenades. Lawson reported to Ottawa four days after setting sail for Hong Kong that training with the Winnipeg Grenadiers was going well, but with the Royal Rifles it was "sticky". Other soldiers learned other things, for example the French-Canadian signalman Georges "Blacky" Verreault was introduced for the first time to the distinctive language of the English-Canadian soldiers, which mostly involved using the word fuck as much as possible, with one soldier telling him the proper way to ask for butter was to say: "Please, private, kindly pass the fucking butter or for fuck's sake, give me that lovely piece of cake."

Upon landing in Kowloon Harbor on 16 November, the C Force was personally greeted by Sir Mark Young, the Governor of Hong Kong, and Major-General Christopher Maltby, the General Officer Commanding (GOC) of Hong Kong. The first action of C Force was to march down the Nathan Road in Hong Kong, accompanied by a British Army brass band playing martial music. The next day, Lawson toured Hong Kong with Maltby to survey the lay of the land and to establish the best places for defensive positions. They did not have full equipment: a ship carrying all their vehicles was diverted to Manila when the war began. The soldiers were still undergoing training and acclimatization. Lawson suggested that a third battalion from Canada would be arriving soon to complete a full brigade. Maltby had initially planned to defend only Hong Kong Island and to abandon Kowloon and the New Territories, but with the arrival of the two extra battalions from Canada, he now felt he had enough troops to man the Gin Drinkers' Line that formed the frontier with China. Lawson did not disagree with Maltby's plans and reported to Ottawa that he believed Hong Kong, if invaded, could hold out for months.

C Force was stationed at the Shamshuipo camp, which consisted of spacious and comfortable huts built in the 1920s, though they lacked toilets. Since the daily wage for a servant in Hong Kong was 25 cents per day, every soldier had a servant assigned to him who shaved his face and washed his uniforms. This lead men who had lived through the Great Depression to perceive life in Hong Kong as the height of luxury, though the absence of toilets, along with the daily rounds of the night soil trucks, was considered revolting. The majority of the men liked Hong Kong, seeing it as an exotic "Eastern" city full of Western comforts. Many of the soldiers had grown up in the small towns in rural Manitoba and Quebec and enjoyed the "sophisticated nightlife" of Hong Kong. One soldier from Oshawa, Jeff Marston, wrote home to his mother on 23 November 1941, expressing enthusiasm about Hong Kong, describing it as a "beautiful city". In the same letter, he mentioned that the Canadians loved to spend their free time at the "Roller-Dome" for roller-skating, which was full of the "loveliest looking Chinese girls I have ever seen," and at a luxurious dance hall called the Dreamland, where the latest "hit" American pop music was played.

Marston stated that the Hong Kong Chinese at the Dreamland dance hall were "ever good dancers" and "the way they dress here is simply terrific...the girls wear their dress 'cut' and they reach as far down as their ankles. Although the colors are dazzling (and they all wear sandals)." Marston's letter, which was typical of the letters sent home from Hong Kong, concluded: "I am having a really marvelous time here, the food is excellent. It's marvelous to see the things I have read about in Picture Magazines only to come true before my very eyes." Though Canadians had previously served in Asia when a Canadian garrison occupied the Russian city of Vladivostok ("the star of the east") in Siberia during the Russian Civil War, members of C Force believed that they were the first Canadian military force to serve in Asia, which was seen as a great honour.

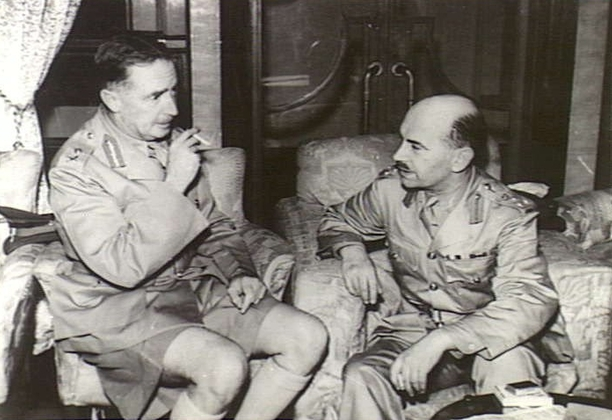
Major-General Christopher Maltby, the GOC of Hong Kong on the left with Brigadier-General John Lawson, the GOC of C Force on the right.

Another soldier attached to C Force, Company Sergeant Major George McDonell of the Royal Rifles of Canada, stated in an interview in 2006 that being sent to Hong Kong "...was a great adventure. We were just kids. We knew nothing about Hong Kong, nothing about China... we joined the Army to fight wherever we were sent." McDonell also mentioned it was commonly believed that C Force had been sent to Hong Kong for training and that after the training was completed, they would go to Europe. Another veteran of C Force, Private Maurice D'Avignon of Quebec City, in a public letter in 1948 written in slightly broken English, stated: "When we volunteered in the Army we were ready to fight anywhere in the British Empire. If destiny has sent us to Hong Kong it was our duty as true Canadians to defend it the best we could."

The major Canadian units involved in the defence of Hong Kong were the Winnipeg Grenadiers and the Royal Rifles of Canada. In addition, the Canadians provided a brigade headquarters. The major issue facing Major-General Maltby, in charge of the defence of Hong Kong, was that there were not enough troops to man the Gin Drinkers' Line that divided the New Territories of Hong Kong while still keeping a reserve to hold Hong Kong Island. On 30 November 1941, the Japanese Prime Minister, General Tojo, knelt before the Emperor and asked, via the president of the privy council, for permission to go to war and for approval of a list of operations, starting with the plan to bomb the American naval base at Pearl Harbor. As the Emperor was considered a living god, his voice was felt to be "too pure" to be heard by the prime minister. Instead, when the Emperor nodded his head, it indicated approval.

Every operation Tojo listed was approved by an imperial nod, including the plan to take Hong Kong. Later the same day, General Sakai of the 23rd Army, based in Canton, gave orders to Lieutenant-General Sano Tadayoshi of the 38th Division to start preparations for invading Hong Kong. On 3 December 1941, Maltby and Lawson toured the border. Lawson's diary simply states that he went to "see Japs," while Maltby reported that the Japanese soldiers he had seen were "scruffy, lazy, and uninterested". On 4 December, Maltby dismissed intelligence reports that 20,000 Japanese troops had arrived in the town of Fanling, just five miles north of Hong Kong. Lawson seems to have expected no war in the near future and saw no reason to accelerate the training of his men.

C Force was attached to the reserve holding Hong Kong Island and, as such, did not see action when the Japanese attacked the Gin Drinkers' Line on 7 December 1941. To defend Hong Kong Island, there was the East Brigade under Brigadier-General Cedric Wallis, which included the Royal Rifles of Canada battalion, and the West Brigade under Brigadier-General John K. Lawson, which included the Winnipeg Grenadiers. On 6 December 1941, Maltby received a report from the Hong Kong Constabulary stating that refugees from China were reporting an unusual concentration of Japanese troops just outside of the New Territories.

== The Battle of Hong Kong ==
The Canadians were initially positioned on the south side of the island to counter any amphibious landing. This meant that when the Japanese invaded the island, they were the units called upon to counterattack. On 8 December, Japanese aircraft destroyed a nearly empty camp at Sham Shui Po, where two men of the Royal Canadian Signals were wounded, marking the first Canadian casualties in the Pacific theatre and the first Canadian army casualties in combat. On 11 December, the Winnipeg Grenadiers became the first Canadian Army subunit to fight in battle during the Second World War, with D Company acting as a rearguard during the retreat from Kowloon. Private John Grey was killed during the evacuation. It is unknown how he died, but guesses have included mobs, fifth columnists, and execution by the Japanese. The majority of the men of C Force were strongly patriotic and saw themselves as fighting for the British Empire, particularly believing that by defending Hong Kong, they were defending Australia, seen at the time as a fellow member of the Commonwealth "family". The Japanese had believed that after smashing through the Gin Drinkers' Line, the British would surrender Hong Kong, and that the operation would last only three days at most.

Maltby had expected the Gin Drinkers' Line to hold for at least a week and was shocked that the Japanese had broken through so quickly, over the course of one night. One of Maltby's staff officers later remembered that the headquarters was in "chaos", with no one really knowing what was happening or what to do. Maltby ordered Lawson to send the Winnipeg Grenadiers to Kowloon. On 18 December 1941, the Japanese landed on Hong Kong Island, and the first substantial clash occurred on 19 December 1941 at the Wong Nai Chong Gap, where the Winnipeg Grenadiers and the Royal Scots were stationed. After a hard-fought action lasting all morning of 19 December, Major A. B. Gresham of A Company, Winnipeg Grenadiers, led a counterattack that pushed the Japanese back but was in turn encircled at Jardine's Lookout later in the afternoon. Company Sergeant Major John Robert Osborn was killed during the fighting on 19 December and was posthumously awarded the Victoria Cross, the highest decoration for bravery in battle in the British Empire, becoming the first Canadian to be so honoured in World War Two. During the fighting, the commander of C Force, Brigadier Lawson, was killed in action. After three days of fighting, the Japanese finally took the Wong Nai Chong Gap.

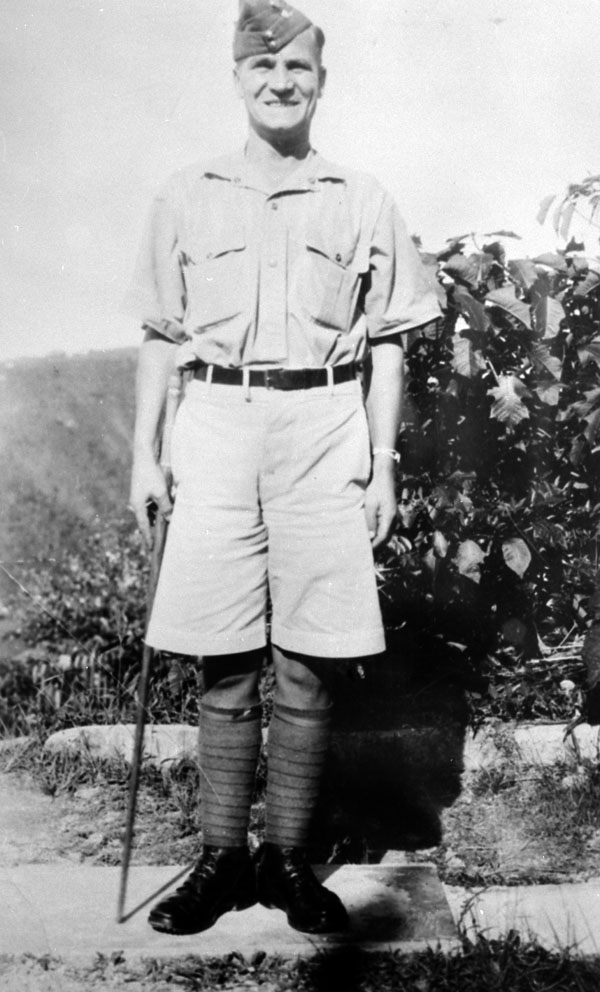
John Robert Osborn of the Winnipeg Grenadiers was the first Canadian to be awarded the Victoria Cross in World War Two.

Major Reynolds Condon of the US Army, who was attached as a military attache to the American consulate in Hong Kong, praised the performance of C Force, writing, "The individual courage shown by officers and men was amazing in view of their low morale. The officers especially went forward to their deaths without hesitancy, although they had in their hearts no hope of success." A particular tragedy that befell the Winnipeg Grenadiers was that there were five sets of brothers killed over three days of fighting. As the Winnipeg Grenadiers were a close-knit battalion recruited from southern Manitoba, the loss of so many brothers over such a short period of time could have caused morale problems, but it appears not to have done so. The first brothers to be killed on 19 December were the Kelso brothers, John and Henry. Henry Kelso was born in Belfast, while his younger brother John had been born in Winnipeg, but the two brothers died within sight of each other.

Private Gordon Land and Lance Corporal Roy Land were also both killed, with Gordon Land being killed in action while Roy Land was taken prisoner and used by the Japanese for "bayonet practice". As his body was repeatedly pierced by bayonets, Roy Land swore so defiantly and loudly at his tormentors that a Japanese officer finally shot him in the head to silence him. Lance Corporal Ewart Starrett was killed by Japanese rifle fire while leading a charge up a hill on 19 December, while his brother, Lance Corporal William Starrett, was killed the next day after being taken prisoner and used for "bayonet practice". Private Donald Folster and his brother Private Herbert Folster both fell together while fighting against the Japanese. Lieutenant W. Vaughen Mitchell and his brother, Lieutenant Eric Mitchell, were wounded and then killed by the Japanese on 20 December 1941, being used for "bayonet practice".

The Royal Rifles of Canada, a French-Canadian unit recruited in the Quebec City area and commanded by the English-Canadian Lieutenant-Colonel W.J. Home, first saw action on 19 December as the Japanese divided the East Brigade into two, forcing the Royal Rifles to retreat into the village of Stanley. Over the following days, the Royal Rifles saw actions of varying degrees of intensity. McDonell of the Royal Rifles later recalled: "It takes a while for green troops to become acclimatized and realize that fire discipline is important and never give your position away. Well, it took us a long time to learn that. We were green, so they had an enormous advantage... they had been fighting in China for two years. They were really tough professional soldiers, and constantly when we stopped them, the encirclement would begin. You see, we didn't have enough troops, so when we stopped them cold somewhere, within an hour, they would start the encirclement around the flanks, and the next thing you know, machine-gun bullets would come plowing into your back. And again and again, they almost closed the circle and trapped us, trapped my platoon and my company."

Wallis, who was accustomed to Europe, where people generally automatically obeyed their social superiors, found the Canadians, who were the product of a more egalitarian society, difficult to deal with. Wallis complained in 1947 that "when he had to issue orders to an officer of the R.R.C., the order and its suitability or otherwise (as they saw it) would be discussed in a sort of 'soviet' by any present at the time. If the Canadians thought the action ordered a good thing, it would be obeyed. If those present did not care for it, in all probability it would not be carried out." Wallis's relations with Home were difficult, as Home maintained that the losses taken by the Royal Rifles made Wallis's orders to counterattack and retake the Wong Nei Chong Gap almost impossible.

The most ferocious action for the Royal Rifles occurred on Christmas Day when Wallis ordered the Royal Rifles to launch a counterattack to retake the northern parts of Stanley village. Home protested against this order, saying it was well known that Maltby was going to surrender later the same day, but the attack went ahead anyway as it was felt necessary to maintain the honour of the British Empire. When the order came to attack Stanley on Christmas Day, McDonell remembered that his men were "...completely exhausted, covered with blood, dirt, wounds; on Christmas Day, I woke them up from the first sleep they'd had inside, behind a wall. We had been pulled out for a day to get some rest. I called them together and said, 'At one o'clock the company is going to attack Stanley village below us,' in broad daylight, no support, no artillery, no heavy machine guns, nothing... Now they looked at me as if I had lost my mind. I knew this was suicide. I knew I would never live through that day and then I thought to myself, well, if they're gonna mutiny, now is the time because this order is insane... but I stood in front of my troops and said, 'We're going in at one o'clock.'... Not a single man said, 'I can't do it, I wanna be relieved, I've been wounded,' not a single person asked to be excused from the attack. Not a single man."

D company of the Royal Rifles, commanded by McDonell, advanced across four hundred yards of open ground but were helped by the Japanese not expecting a counterattack. Upon reaching the Japanese lines, fierce hand-to-hand fighting occurred with both sides using their bayonets to avoid killing their own as the close quarters made it inadvisable to fire their rifles. Finally, the Japanese were expelled by the Royal Rifles. As the Japanese retreated across the open road, McDonell had his men open fire on them with submachine guns and three Bren guns, recalling that their losses were substantial. Furious at being defeated, the Japanese vented their fury via the St. Stephen's College massacre, storming into the makeshift hospital operating at the St. Stephen's College to massacre all of the wounded soldiers being treated there. During the battle for Stanley village, the Royal Rifles had taken 100 casualties, of which 28 were fatal.

As for Japanese losses, McDonell remembered: "We killed an awful lot of them. My God." Later in the day, the Japanese began to counterattack, and McDonell was forced to order a retreat after almost running out of ammunition. As the Royal Rifles were forced to retreat, McDonell stayed behind to operate a Bren gun. Later the same day, the news came that Maltby had surrendered, ordering all of the men under his command to lay down their arms and accept whatever mercy the Japanese were prepared to give. As the Royal Rifles collected their dead to bury them under Japanese guard, McDonell was struck by how much-dried blood there was on the streets of Stanley. In the subsequent fight for Hong Kong Island, the Canadians lost 290 personnel, of which 130 were from the Grenadiers. The commander of West Brigade HQ, Brigadier Lawson, was killed. The remaining Canadian soldiers surrendered to the Japanese on Christmas Day.

== Awards ==
Soldiers of 'C' Force were awarded a total of 100 decorations. The following table shows the unit, the decoration and the number awarded.

Regiment or corps	Decoration/ award	No.
Canadian Auxiliary Service	MBE	1
Canadian Auxiliary Service	MiD	1
Canadian Chaplains Service	MC	1
Canadian Chaplains Service	MiD	1
Royal Canadian Dental Corps	MiD	1
Royal Canadian Postal Corps	DCM	1
Royal Canadian Army Medical Corps	MBE	3
Royal Canadian Army Medical Corps	ARRC	2
Royal Canadian Army Medical Corps	MiD	1
Royal Canadian Corps of Signals	DCM	1
Royal Canadian Corps of Signals	MM	1
Royal Canadian Corps of Signals	BEM	1
Royal Canadian Corps of Signals	MiD	2
Royal Canadian Ordnance Corps	MM	1
The Royal Rifles of Canada	DSO	1
The Royal Rifles of Canada	OBE	1
The Royal Rifles of Canada	MBE	2
The Royal Rifles of Canada	MC	1
The Royal Rifles of Canada	DCM	1
The Royal Rifles of Canada	MM	6
The Royal Rifles of Canada	DM	1
The Royal Rifles of Canada	MiD	28
The Winnipeg Grenadiers	VC	1
The Winnipeg Grenadiers	DSO	1
The Winnipeg Grenadiers	MC	3
The Winnipeg Grenadiers	DCM	1
The Winnipeg Grenadiers	MM	5
The Winnipeg Grenadiers	BEM	2
The Winnipeg Grenadiers	MiD	26

Decoration and award descriptions, in order of precedence:

- VC – Victoria Cross
- DSO – Distinguished Service Order
- OBE – Officer of the Most Excellent Order of the British Empire status
- MBE – Member of the Most Excellent Order of the British Empire status
- MC – Military Cross
- ARRC – Associate of the Royal Red Cross
- DCM – Distinguished Conduct Medal
- MM – Military Medal
- BEM – British Empire Medal
- DM – Dickin Medal
- MiD – Mentioned in Despatches

References for the above awards

- Canada Gazette, 44 10 January, No. 10, Vol. 78, p2404
- Canada Gazette, 46 8 April, No. 14, Vol. 80, p2066
- Canada Gazette, 46 15 June, No. 24, Vol. 80, p2404
- London Gazette, 48 20 February, No. 38212, p1175

== Legacy ==
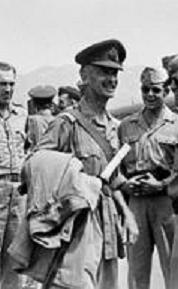
Christopher Maltby, the GOC of Hong Kong. In a controversial 1948 report, he largely blamed C Force for his defeat.

Over the next four years, the number of Canadians who died as prisoners of the Japanese exceeded those who fell defending Hong Kong, with starvation being the primary cause of death among the Canadian POWs. Brigadier-General Orville Kay, who had once commanded the Winnipeg Grenadiers, was sent to Chunking in August 1943 as the first Canadian military attaché to China, where his primary concern was finding out what happened to the POWs taken at Hong Kong. To assist with his work, Kay had Captain Morris Perrault attached to the British Army Aid Group operating in southern China.

Surviving Canadian servicemen from this battle formed the Hong Kong Veterans Association. In December 1991, they planted two maple trees in Sham Shui Po Park in memory of their comrades. The deployment of C Force has been the object of immense controversy. Because the Battle of Hong Kong was an Allied defeat, there have been various efforts almost from the moment the battle ended to find a culprit to blame. In 1948, a report by Christopher Maltby appeared in which he largely blamed C Force for the defeat. The report was censored by the order of Field Marshal Bernard Law Montgomery, the Chief of the Imperial General Staff, who removed the "more inflammatory passages" from Maltby's report out of fear of causing a crisis in Anglo-Canadian relations.

The full uncensored version of Maltby's report did not become public until 1993. In a critique of Maltby's report, the British-born Canadian General Charles Foulkes, who was serving as chief of the general staff in 1948, wrote: "The most regrettable feature arising out of the inadequate training and equipping was the effect on the morale and fighting efficiency of the Canadian troops, which unfortunately was interpreted by their British superiors as a lack of courage, willingness to fight, and even in some cases cowardice. On the other hand, this has caused in the minds of Canadian troops bitterness, lack of confidence, and resentment towards their British superiors."

A number of British historians, such as Oliver Lindsay in the first edition of "The Lasting Honor" (1978), Tim Carew in The Fall of Hong Kong: Britain, China and the Japanese Occupation (1963), Philip Snow in The Fall of Hong Kong (2003), and Andrew Whitfield in Hong Kong, Empire and the Anglo-American Alliance at War (2003), have portrayed C Force as cowardly and undisciplined, with the implication that Hong Kong could have held out longer if only C Force had fought better. Such criticism had its origins in a report in 1948 by Maltby. In Canada, such criticism of C Force has been echoed by historians such as Carl Vincent in No Reason Why: The Canadian Hong Kong Tragedy, An Examination (1981) and by the McKenna brothers, who produced a documentary in 1992 titled The Valor and the Horror that portrayed C Force in an unflattering light. By contrast, historians such as Terry Copp in his article "The Defence of Hong Kong, December 1941" (2001) in the journal Canadian Military History, Tony Banham in his book Not the Slightest Chance: The Defence of Hong Kong 1941 (2003), and Oliver Lindsay in the second edition of his book The Lasting Honor, have largely defended the performance of C Force.

The Canadian historian David Franco Marci wrote that C Force was outnumbered and outgunned but "...acquitted themselves well. They too fought with determination, and in the end are deserving of greater praise instead of the scorn that has been frequently expressed". Marci also criticized Maltby's report, writing that as the British GOC (General Officer Commanding) of Hong Kong, he had a vested interest in portraying his defeat as no fault of his own, and like many a defeated general before him, blamed his troops for letting him down. In a study deeply critical of the Canadian Army's performance in World War Two, the Canadian historian Colonel John English wrote that during the "impossible struggle" in Hong Kong, C Force "...nonetheless held out with their imperial comrades for 17 days, proving that regardless of their state of training, Canadian troops were prepared to fight tenaciously and die hard". The American historian Gerhard Weinberg described the defence of Hong Kong, together with the defence of Wake Island and Bataan in the Philippines, as the cases of "...a garrison with little hope of relief had fought hard and effectively against an experienced, but not very capably led opponent; Malaya was different on both counts".

The same allegation made against the Canadians at Hong Kong was repeated by the defeated British GOC at Singapore, Arthur Percival, against the Indian Army troops under his command. Percival claimed that Singapore could have been saved if only he had more British troops, but that he had been let down by his Indian troops, whom he claimed were cowardly and undisciplined. On the other hand, there has been a tendency on the part of Canadian nationalists to see the dispatch of C Force as an attempt by the British to use Canadian troops as cannon fodder. In his 1997 book Hell on Earth: Aging Faster, Dying Sooner: Canadian Prisoners of the Japanese During World War II, the Canadian historian David McIntosh summed up the Battle of Hong Kong as "A British waste of Canadian manpower."

McDonnell later stated in the same 2006 interview: "We won the fucking war... The people who are whining don't understand that war is a terrible thing. If you volunteer to fight for your country, it's not going to be a Sunday school party... It was tough, but the Canadians in the prison camps were magnificent... starved to death, but never disobeyed orders." In the same manner, D'Avignon, in his 1948 letter written in broken English, defended the record of C Force as he wrote, "If such a battle was given to the Japanese and their casualties prove it sure wasn't given by untrained soldiers. It took the Japanese seventeen days to capture Hong Kong with 6,000 untrained soldiers to defend it and it took the same army eight days to defeat 75,000 trained soldiers of Singapore... If during the seventeen days we fought it gave a chance to Australia to get reinforcement from England and USA. I think it was an honor for Canadian soldiers to participate in saving Australia." In a summary of the controversy over C Force, the British historian Tony Banham wrote in 2015, "Clearly the Canadian authorities did not send their most battle-ready formations to Hong Kong. They sent two unready battalions with a varied quality of officers, generally good NCOs, and a wide spectrum of men. They also—through unfortunate timing—sent them too late. This work does not attempt to explore those limitations but to point out that to accept them and then conclude that everything that went wrong afterward was therefore 'the fault of the British' is unrealistic."

The Hong Kong Veterans Commemorative Association dedicated the Hong Kong Memorial Wall on Sussex Drive at King Edward Avenue in Ottawa, Ontario, on 15 August 2009, to the 1,977 Canadians who sailed to Hong Kong in 1941 to assist the British in defending the colony against the Japanese invasion. The names of 961 members of the Royal Rifles are etched on one side of the wall, and the names of 911 Grenadiers are on the other side of a six-meter concrete wall covered in granite, with the upper part shaped as a mountain landscape. The 106 members of the Brigade Headquarters, including doctors, dentists, and chaplains, are listed on either end of the memorial.

The Historic Sites and Monuments Board of Canada erected a memorial rock with a plaque near the Hong Kong Memorial Wall on 15 August 2009, which describes the Canadian role in the defence of Hong Kong: "In late 1941, 1,975 Canadians arrived in Hong Kong to reinforce the garrison. They fought with courage and determination against overwhelming odds after the Japanese attacked on December 8. Many distinguished themselves under fire, including Company Sergeant-Major John Robert Osborn, who won Canada's first Victoria Cross of the Second World War. During the seventeen-day battle, 290 men died. After the surrender, 267 more perished during long years of harsh captivity. The Canadians' role in the defence of Hong Kong stands as an eloquent expression of their lasting honour."

== Books and articles ==
- Banham, Tony (November 2015). "A Historiography of C Force". Canadian Military History. 24 (2): 235–254.
- English, John (1991). Failure in High Command: The Canadian Army and the Normandy Campaign. Ottawa: Golden Dog Press. ISBN 9-780919-614604.
- Greenfield, Nathan (2010). The Damned: The Canadians at the Battle of Hong Kong and the POW Experience, 1941–45. Toronto: HarperCollins Publishers. ISBN 978-1-55468-219-5.
- Greenhous, Brereton (2016). C" Force to Hong Kong: A Canadian Catastrophe. Toronto: Dundurn. ISBN 978-1-55488-043-0.
- Macri, Franco David (2011). "Canadians under Fire: C Force and the Battle of Hong Kong, December 1941". Journal of the Royal Asiatic Society Hong Kong. 51: 233–251.
- Morton, Desmond (1999). A Military History of Canada. Toronto: McClelland & Stewart. ISBN 0-7710-6514-0.
- Kwong, Chi Man; Tsoi, Yiu Lun (2014). Eastern Fortress: A Military History of Hong Kong, 1840–1970. Hong Kong: Hong Kong University Press. ISBN 978-988-8208-70-8.
- Rothwell, Victor (2001). The Origins of the Second World War. Manchester: Manchester University Press. ISBN 0-7190-5958-5.
- Weinberg, Gerhard (2005). A World at Arms: A Global History of World War Two. Cambridge: Cambridge University Press. ISBN 978-0-521-61826-7.
