= Gander (dog) =

WWII Canadian Army dog who served in Hong Kong

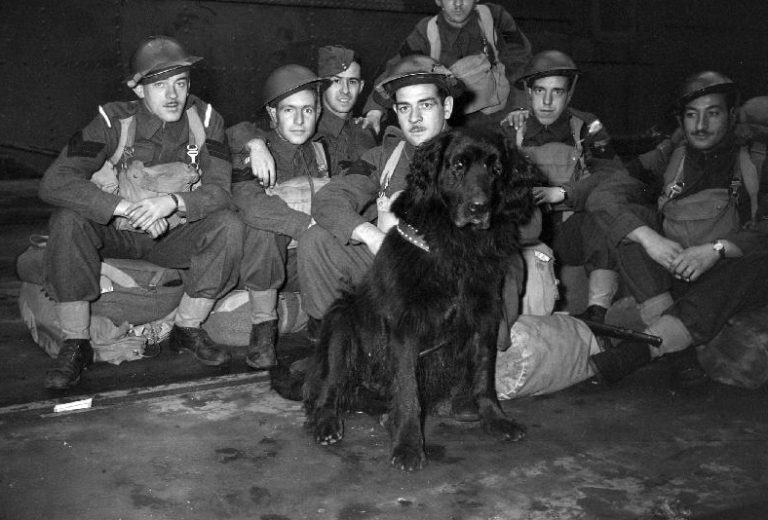
Gander with members of C Company, Royal Rifles of Canada, en route to Hong Kong in October 1941.

Gander (originally Pal, and also known as Sergeant Gander) was a Newfoundland dog who served as the mascot of the Royal Rifles of Canada during World War II. He was killed in action during the Battle of Hong Kong in 1941, and was posthumously awarded the Dickin Medal, the "animals' Victoria Cross", in 2000 for his deeds in the course of that battle. It was the first such award in over 50 years.

== Military service ==
Gander, initially a family pet named Pal, accidentally scratched a child's face with his paw. Worried that he would be forced to have Pal put down, the original owner gave the large dog to the Royal Rifles of Canada, a regiment of the Canadian Army stationed at Gander International Airport, Newfoundland and Labrador. The soldiers quickly renamed him Gander and "promoted" him to sergeant. When the unit was shipped to Hong Kong in the fall of 1941, Gander went along.

The Battle of Hong Kong began on December 8, 1941, the day after the attack on Pearl Harbor. Gander helped fight the Japanese invaders on three occasions. The last time, Gander picked up a thrown Japanese hand grenade and rushed with it toward the enemy, dying in the ensuing explosion, but saving the lives of several wounded Canadian soldiers.

After efforts by the Canadian War Museum, the Hong Kong Veterans Association, and the Hong Kong Veterans Commemorative Association, the People's Dispensary for Sick Animals awarded Gander the Dickin Medal on October 27, 2000, the first such award since 1949. The Dickin Medal is often referred to as the animal equivalent of the Victoria Cross. The citation reads:

For saving the lives of Canadian infantrymen during the Battle of Lye Mun on Hong Kong Island in December 1941. On three documented occasions, Gander, the Newfoundland mascot of The Royal Rifles of Canada, engaged the enemy as his regiment joined The Winnipeg Grenadiers, members of Battalion Headquarters "C" Force and other Commonwealth troops in their courageous defence of the island. Twice Gander's attacks halted the enemy's advance and protected groups of wounded soldiers. In a final act of bravery, the war dog was killed in action gathering a grenade. Without Gander's intervention, many more lives would have been lost in the assault.

== Honours ==
At the insistence of survivors of the battle, his name was listed with those of 1975 men and two women on the Hong Kong Veterans Memorial Wall in Ottawa, Ontario, Canada.

On July 23, 2015, statues of Gander and his handler were unveiled at Gander Heritage Memorial Park in Gander, Newfoundland.

The Forgotten Heroes monument at the Cobequid Veterans Memorial Park in Bass River, Nova Scotia, initiated as an elementary school project and designed by 11-year-old Noah Tremblay, commemorates heroic animals. It includes a statue of Gander by Nova Scotia sculptor Clifton Sears.

== See also ==
- List of individual dogs
