= 148th Battalion, CEF =

Battalion of the First World War Canadian Expeditionary Force

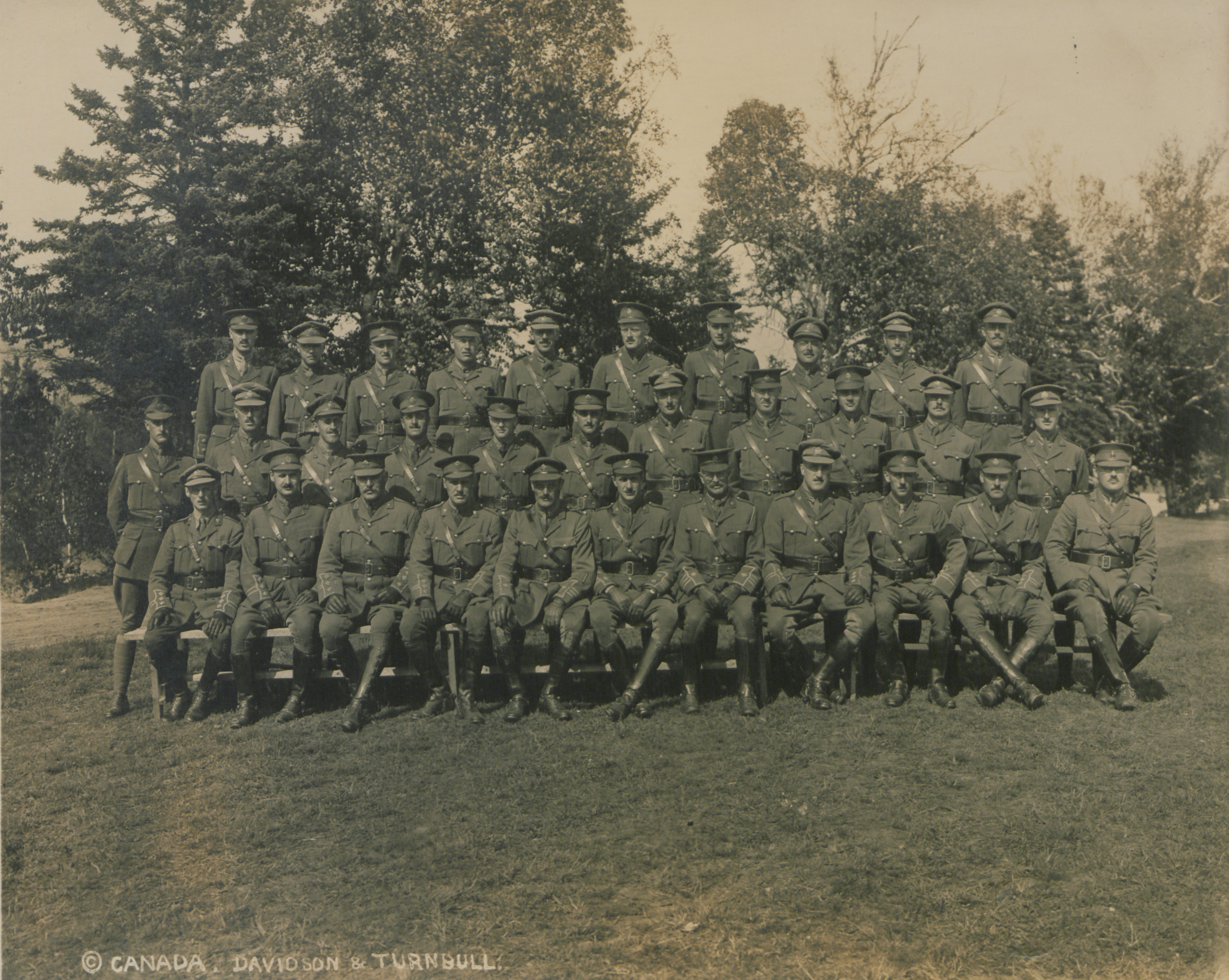
Officers of the 148th Battalion in Canada, 1916

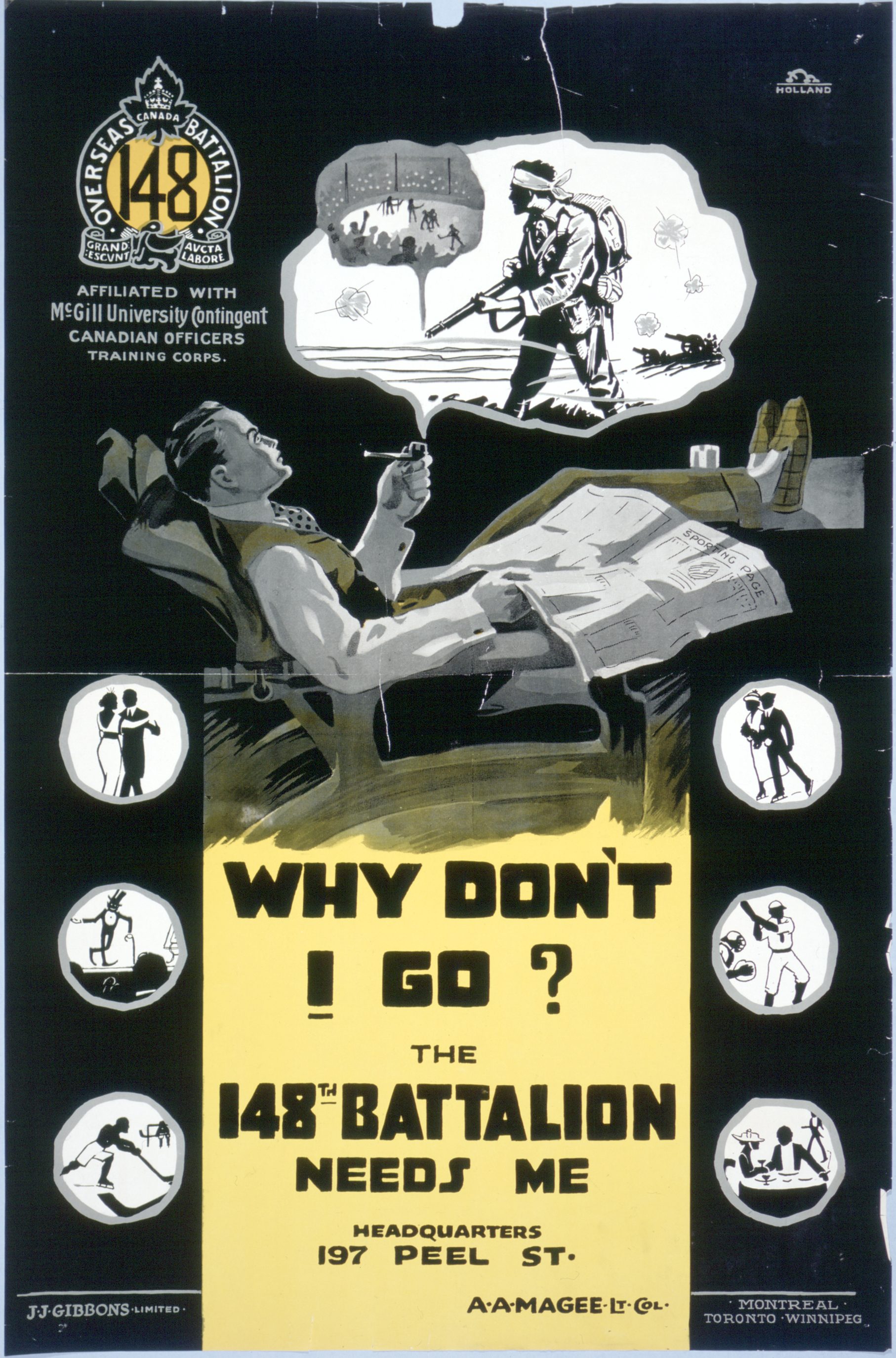
“Why don’t I go?” war poster created [between 1914 and 1918] from the Archives of Ontario poster collection.

The 148th Battalion, CEF was a unit in the Canadian Expeditionary Force during the First World War. Based in Montreal, Quebec, the unit began recruiting in late 1915 in that city and the surrounding district. After sailing to England in September 1916, the battalion was absorbed into the 20th Reserve Battalion on January 8, 1917. The 148th Battalion, CEF had two Officers Commanding: Lieut-Col. A. A. Magee, and Major Alfred Soden English (Canadian Grenadier Guards) who had served with the 14th Battalion (RMR) in France in 1915.
