= John K. Lawson =

Canadian Army officer

John Kelburne Lawson
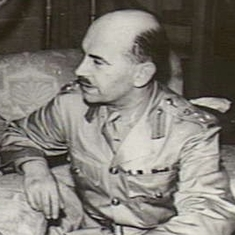
- Lawson, c. 1941
- Born: 27 December 1886; Hull, England
- Died: 19 December 1941 (aged 54); British Hong Kong
- Burial place: Sai Wan War Cemetery, Chai Wan
- Military career
- Allegiance: Canada
- Branch: Canadian Army
- Service years: 1914–1941
- Rank: Brigadier
- Commands: C Force
- Conflicts: World War I: Battle of Passchendaele; Battle of the Somme; World War II: Battle of Hong Kong †
- Awards: Croix de Guerre

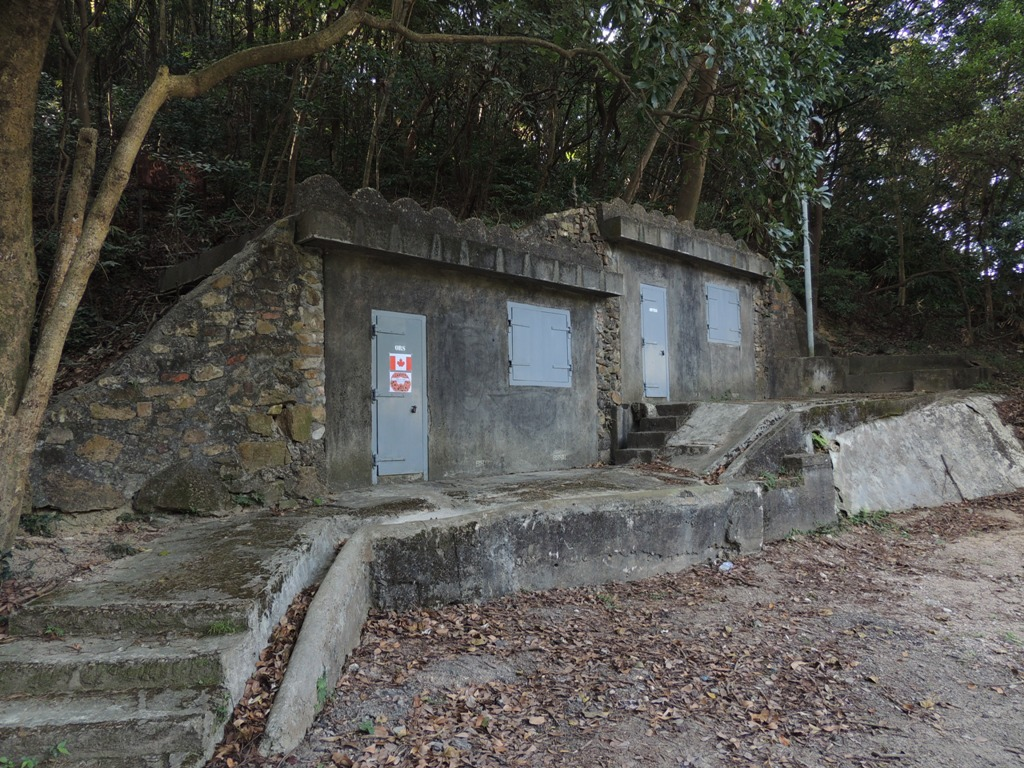
West Brigade Headquarters north bunker at Wong Nai Chong Gap, Hong Kong

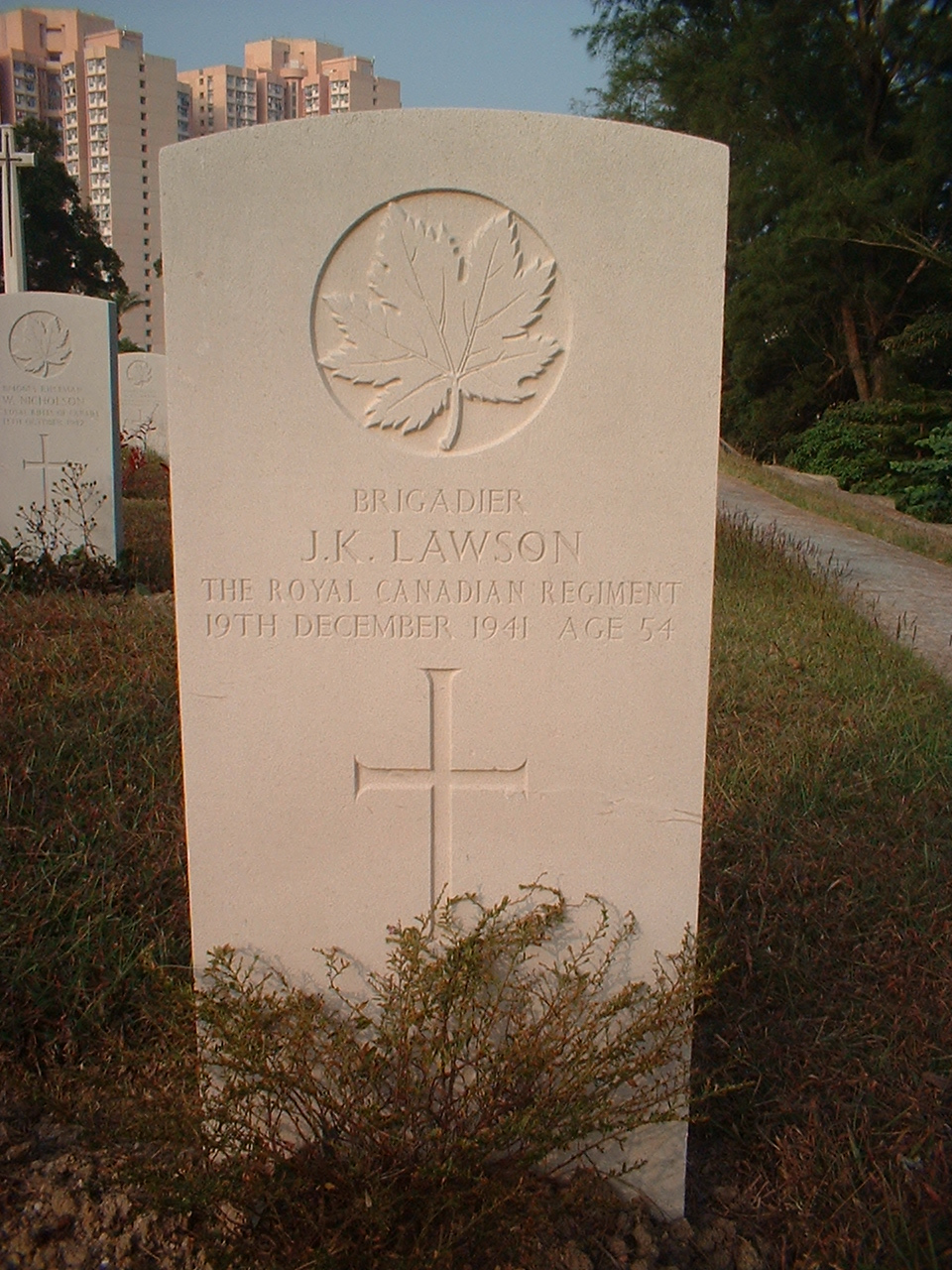
The headstone of Brigadier J. K. Lawson at Sai Wan War Cemetery

John Kelburne Lawson (27 December 1886 – 19 December 1941) was a Canadian military officer who served as commander of the West Brigade during the Battle of Hong Kong. A brigadier, he was the most senior officer to be killed in action during the battle.

== Early career ==
Lawson was born in Hull, East Riding of Yorkshire. He emigrated to Edmonton in 1914 where he worked as a clerk for the Hudson's Bay Company. He enlisted in the Canadian Expeditionary Force (CEF) upon the outbreak of the First World War. He joined the 9th Battalion, CEF, and variously worked at the 1st Canadian Motor Machine Gun Brigade and at Corps Headquarters. Although he is often incorrectly attributed a Military Cross for actions at the Battle of Passchendaele or the Battle of the Somme, he was twice mentioned in despatches and received the French Croix de guerre. Lawson joined as a private in 1914 and rose to the rank of warrant officer first class before commissioning. He held the rank of captain at the end of the war.

Lawson joined the Permanent Active Militia during the interwar years. He held various positions in Calgary, Kingston, Toronto, and Ottawa. He completed staff college in Quetta in 1923–1924, and was posted to the War Office in London, England, in 1930.

When the Second World War broke out, he was Director of Military Training in Ottawa. He was given command of the Royal Rifles of Canada, The Winnipeg Grenadiers, and the other Canadian support units which arrived in Hong Kong on 16 November 1941 to reinforce the British garrison ahead of the Battle of Hong Kong (8–25 December 1941).

== Battle of Hong Kong ==
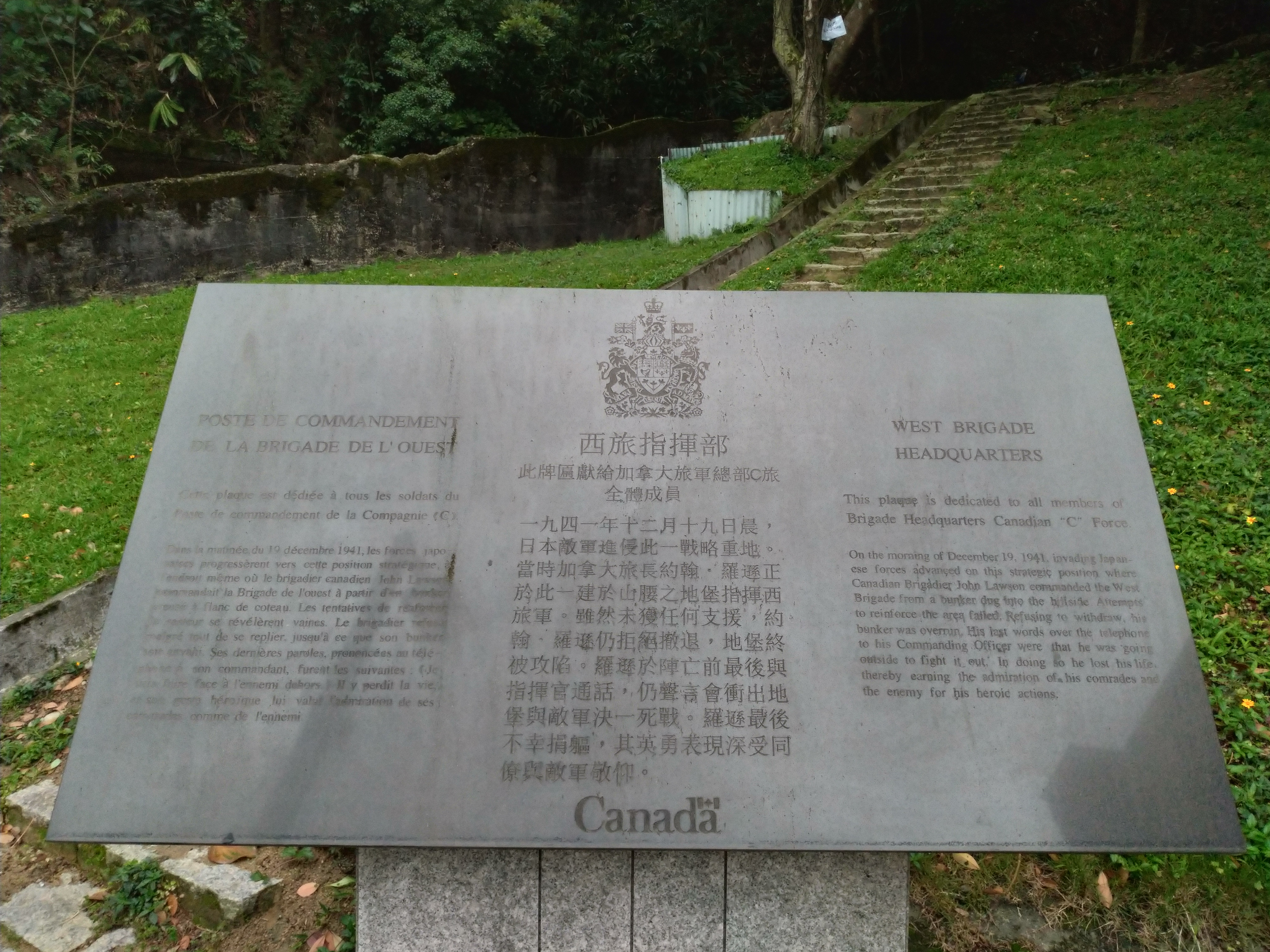
The plaque is dedicated to Lawson and all members of Brigade Headquarters C Force.

After the forces defending Kowloon were withdrawn to the island of Hong Kong on 11 December 1941, General Christopher Maltby organized the defence of the island into two brigades, west and east. Lawson was placed in charge of the west brigade, which included the Winnipeg Grenadiers, the Royal Scots, the Punjab Regiment (India) and the Canadian Signallers. The Japanese landed on Hong Kong Island on 18 December 1941 with the intent to split the defenders in two. After fierce fighting, Japanese forces surrounded Lawson's headquarters at around 10 a.m. on 19 December. Lawson radioed his commanders that he was "going outside to fight his way out" and left his splinter-proof shelter with a small group of his officers. He was killed immediately after leaving his shelters by a burst of Japanese machine gun fire.

A chaplain was allowed to remove Lawson's silver identification disc bracelet and held on to it through four years as a Japanese prisoner of war before returning it to Lawson's family in Canada. Meanwhile, Hong Kong was relieved only on 16 September 1945, more than a month after the war ended.

The original headstone erected by the Japanese was removed after the war. Lawson was reburied at the Sai Wan War Cemetery after the war. A memorial plate was erected by the Canadian government at the site in 2005.

== Personal life ==
Lawson was married to Augusta Hawkesworth Wilson in 1930 and had two sons, Lieutenant-Colonel Arthur John (1934-2021) and Michael Ivan (1936-2012).

His family donated his medals to the Royal Canadian Military Institute.

== See also ==
- John Robert Osborn
