= 171st Battalion (Quebec Rifles), CEF =

The 171st (Quebec Rifles) Battalion, CEF was a unit in the Canadian Expeditionary Force during the First World War. Based in Quebec City, Quebec, the unit began recruiting during the winter of 1915/16. After sailing to England in November 1916, the battalion was absorbed by the 148th Battalion, CEF, 5th Pioneers, and the 20th Reserve Battalion in December 1916. The 171st (Quebec Rifles) Battalion, CEF had one Officer Commanding: Lieut-Col. Sir Wm. Price.
