= Rifle regiment =

Military unit type and size designation

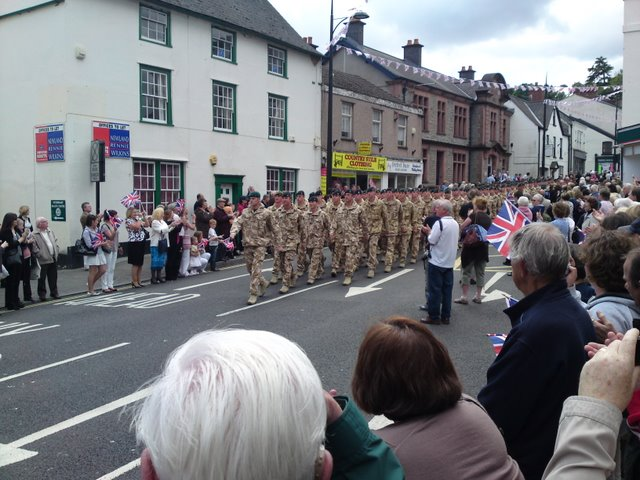
Personnel of 1st Battalion, The Rifles on parade in Chepstow, 21 May 2009.

A rifle regiment is a military unit consisting of a regiment of infantry troops armed with rifles and known as riflemen. While all infantry units in modern armies are typically armed with rifled weapons the term is still used to denote regiments that follow the distinct traditions that differentiated them from other infantry units.

Rifles had existed for decades before the formations of the first rifle regiments, but were initially too slow to load and too unreliable for use as practical weapons for mass issue. With improvements in the designs of rifles, the first rifle regiment was raised very late in the 18th century as armies could now equip entire units of troops with these new weapons in preference to earlier firearms such as muskets. Though rifles still took about twice as long to load as a musket the increase in accuracy and change in tactics more than compensated for this delay.

== History ==
=== United Kingdom ===
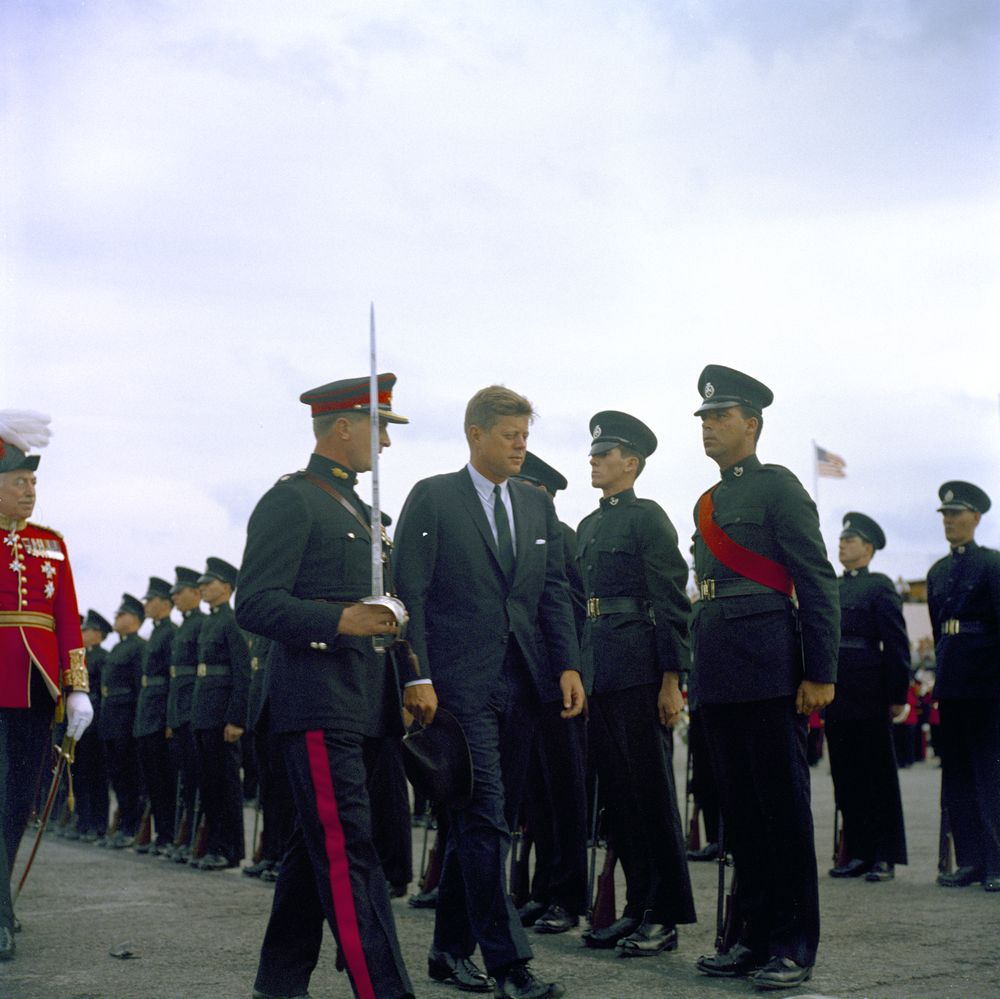
John Fitzgerald Kennedy, escorted by a Bermuda Militia Artillery officer in Royal Artillery blue No. 1 Dress, inspects green-uniformed riflemen of the Bermuda Rifles in 1961

European armies in the 18th century largely consisted of large numbers of line infantry troops in brightly coloured uniforms firing volleys in massed formations on open fields. More emphasis was placed on volume of fire than on individual marksmanship, there was little room for individual manoeuvrability and soldiers were expected to carry heavy packs and march in file. As muskets took so long to reload and were rather inaccurate at more than one or two hundred yards a mass volley was often followed by a bayonet charge. The side that fired first charged, then had its charge disrupted by the opposing volley; firing first was not necessarily an advantage.

These tactics proved ineffective versus the French troops and their Native American allies in the often wooded terrain of North America in the middle of the 18th century. Unofficial experiments with troops wearing homemade dark green or brown coloured jackets and carrying lighter gear were carried out by 60th (Royal American) Regiment under the inspiration of 1st battalion commander Henri Bouquet. A sister battalion, the 5/60 that was raised from foreign troops later fought in the Peninsular War equipped as a normal regiment. It quickly replaced its line infantry with riflemen to become a rifle unit in practice, and later in the 19th century it was named a rifle unit.

Following this successful experimentation, in 1800 Colonel Coote Manningham handpicked troops from fifteen regiments to raise the Experimental Corps of Riflemen which eventually developed into the 95th Rifles, subsequently titled the Rifle Brigade. These troops were distinguished by wearing dark green instead of scarlet jackets (rifle green), a black stripe down the outside of each trouser leg instead of red, black horn buttons instead of polished brass, and black belts instead of white (all to act as camouflage), being armed with the Baker rifle instead of a musket, travelling in dispersed formation, often in pairs, instead of a marching in file and were instructed to aim and be selective of targets. (The use of green was so distinctive that it led to the naming of the Green Jackets Brigade who became the Royal Green Jackets.) Officially the Baker was issued only to rifle regiments, while other infantry units were issued with muskets. Having neither Colours to act as a rally point nor drums to issue commands the riflemen used bugles as signals. Many tactics pioneered by the riflemen are standard infantry tactics today.

Rifle regiments were notable for disciplinary proceedings somewhat less harsh than other units, such as less frequent flogging. Officers in the rifle regiments would also dine with the enlisted men, a practice that was uncommon at the time and is still unusual, officers and enlisted soldiers typically having separate messes. In class-conscious British society, where officers tended to come from the upper classes, and bought and sold commissions, this triggered condescension from regular army officers, who regarded riflemen as socially inferior. With the formation of the part-time Volunteer Force after the Crimean War, most of its units were Volunteer Rifle Corps, although most of these lost their identities through a succession of reforms of Britain's military reserves that saw most Militia infantry and Volunteer Rifle Corps units re-titled as numbered battalions of county infantry regiments, the 1st and 2nd Battalions of which were typically regular army, and most of which were identified as line infantry. By example, the 1st Berkshire Rifle Volunteer Corps raised in 1860 became the 4th Battalion of the Royal Berkshire Regiment (Princess Charlotte of Wales's) in 1908.

==== Lack of colours ====
As rifle regiments travelled in dispersed formation and specifically did not carry colours there was no place to carry their battle honours. Initially they did not carry drums either, but now these are carried, and battle honours are placed on them. Battle honours also appear on the cap badges. When The Rifles were formed in 2007, the cap badge of the Royal Green Jackets was modified into the belt badge, worn on the waist belt up to corporal and on the cross belt for bandsmen and all ranks from serjeant onwards. This means that every rifleman carries the battle honours when in ceremonial uniform.

The Royal Gurkha Rifles carry the Queen's Truncheon instead of a colour. The Indian Army regiments use president's banners instead of colours. These are of the light green facing with the regimental emblem. In the Sri Lanka Sinha Regiment, the president's and regimental truncheons are used instead.

Only the Halifax Rifles and the British Columbia Regiment (Duke of Connaught's Own Rifles), both Canadian Army primary reserve rifle regiments under the Royal Canadian Armoured Corps, carry a guidon in the traditions of cavalry units.

==== Precedence ====
As they are relatively new units, rifle regiments tended to come at the end of the order of precedence when on parade. Following amalgamations and reorganisation in the 19th century some rifle regiments were found substantially higher in order of precedence, such as were The Cameronians (Scottish Rifles), than they are today. With restructuring, the two existing British Army rifle regiments—The Royal Gurkha Rifles and The Rifles—now come at the very end of the regular infantry parade order of precedence, ahead of the Special Air Service.

Each of the 5 Canadian Army rifle regiments all are within the order of precedence of the Royal Canadian Infantry Corps, but march in the same pace as the British rifle regiments right before the Royal Newfoundland Regiment, which is last in the said order (save for Les Voltigeurs de Québec, which marches in the same pace as the regular infantry regiments). However, both the Halifax Rifles and The British Columbia Regiment (Duke of Connaught's Own), as armoured reconnaissance regiments which are part of the Royal Canadian Armoured Corps, march on parade ahead of the other regiments and in the same pace as regular infantry units.

India has only the 4 Gorkha Rifles—no.23 in the precedence order—marching at the same pace as British rifle regiments, with 11 other similar regiments marching at the normal Indian Army pace of 120 steps a minute for quick marches during parades.

The Sri Lanka Sinha Regiment, no.2 in the infantry order of precedence in the Sri Lanka Army and 3rd overall in the general Army order of precedence, does its marching drill in the same manner.

== Modern rifle regiments ==
=== British Army ===
Historically, many regiments consisted of single battalions. After the British Army was restructured in 2003, many regiments have been combined into large regiments. Regiments that perpetuate the history of rifle regiments include:

- The Rifles
- Royal Gurkha Rifles
- Royal Bermuda Regiment

=== Russian Army ===
- 1st Semyonovsky Independent Rifle Regiment

=== Canadian Army ===
Canadian rifle regiments originate from the Canadian Militia, a sedentary militia raised to support of British Army operations in British North America, as well as the Canadian government following Confederation. Rifles designations were maintained when the militia was reorganized to the Canadian Army in 1940. The Canadian Army Primary Reserve has seven rifle regiments (two armoured reconnaissance, five infantry).

==== Royal Canadian Armoured Corps ====
- The Halifax Rifles (RCAC)
- The British Columbia Regiment (Duke of Connaught's Own)

==== Royal Canadian Infantry Corps ====
- The Queen's Own Rifles of Canada
- Les Voltigeurs de Québec
- The Brockville Rifles
- The Royal Winnipeg Rifles
- The Royal Regina Rifles

=== Indian Army ===
The Indian Army presently maintains 10 rifle regiments as follows:

- Rajputana Rifles
- The Garhwal Rifles
- Jammu and Kashmir Rifles
- 1 Gorkha Rifles
- 3 Gorkha Rifles
- 4 Gorkha Rifles
- 5 Gorkha Rifles (Frontier Force)
- 8 Gorkha Rifles
- 9 Gorkha Rifles
- 11 Gorkha Rifles

It also maintains the paramilitary Assam Rifles. This unit, formerly called as the Cachar Levy, is the oldest Paramilitary unit in India that goes back to the nineteenth century and it was raised to guard British Tea Estates from the raids of marauding tribals. In time its functions turned into both police and military nature. It fought in both World Wars and in several Indo Pakistan wars as well as Indo Chinese war of 1962 apart from containing insurgencies in Northeastern India, in particular within the area of the Seven Sister States, corresponding to the former large territories of the state of Assam.

The Assam Rifles, being a police unit in nature, comes under the Ministry of Home Affairs of India, but much of its officers cadre are deputized officers from the Indian Army.

In addition, a number of infantry battalions have been designated as Rashtriya Rifles (RR) counter-insurgency and anti-terrorism battalions, which are larger than regular rifle battalions with a battalion HQ and 6 companies rather than the three or four of normal battalions. The RR is a counter-insurgency force made up of soldiers deputed from other Indian Army combat arms and services. Several battalions carry the affiliations of the rifle regiments mentioned above.

=== Sri Lanka Army ===
The Sri Lanka Army presently maintains one rifle regiment, the reserve Sri Lanka Rifle Corps.

=== Swedish Army ===
The Jämtland Rifle Corps, established in 1646, has been named a rifle regiment since 1820.

== See also ==
- King's Royal Rifle Corps
- Rifle Brigade (Prince Consort's Own)
- Cameronians (Scottish Rifles)
- Royal Ulster Rifles
- British Army order of precedence
