= Battle of Hong Kong order of battle =

The Battle of Hong Kong (8–25 December 1941) was one of the first battles of the Pacific War in World War II.

== Allied ==
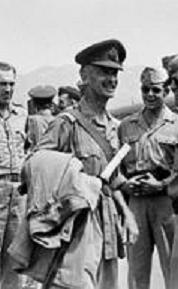
Maj. Gen. Christopher Maltby, Garrison Commander

- Garrison Commander & Fortress Command

General Officer Commanding, Hong Kong: Major General Christopher Maltby
Assistant Adjutant and Quartermaster General: Brig. Andrew Peffers
General Staff Officer, I: Col. Lancey Newnham

=== Ground forces ===
The British ground forces consisted of the following units:

- 2nd Battalion, Royal Scots (Lt. Col. Simon E. H. E. White)
- 1st Battalion, Middlesex Regiment (Lt. Col. Henry W. M. Stewart)
- Royal Rifles of Canada (Lt. Col. William J. Home)
- Winnipeg Grenadiers (Lt. Col. John L. R. Sutcliffe)
- 5th Battalion, 7th Rajput Regiment (Lt. Col. John. Cadogan-Rawlinson)
- 2nd Battalion, 14th Punjab Regiment (Lt. Col. Gerald R. Kidd)
- Hong Kong Chinese Regiment (either Major H. W. A. Mayer or Major. Rodney W. Mayer)
- Hong Kong Volunteer Defence Corps (Col. Henry B. Rose)

Infantry companies No. 1–7
Artillery batteries 1st–5th
Field Company Engineers
Signals
Armoured Car Platoon
Army Service Corps Company
Dispatch Sections
Hughes Group
Field Ambulance unit (Lt. Col. Lindsay Ride)
St. John's Ambulance

- Royal Artillery (Brigadier Tom McCleod)

8th Coast Regiment, Royal Artillery (Lt. Col. Shelby Shaw)

12th Coast Battery (Maj. W. M. Stevenson)
30th Coast Battery (Maj. C. R. Templer)
36th Coast Battery (Capt. W. N. J. Pitt (Note: Made temporary Major))

12th Coast Regiment, Royal Artillery (Maj. Richard L. J. Penfold (Note: Made temporary Colonel))

24th Coast Battery (Capt. E. W. S. Anderson)
26th Coast Battery (Lt. A. O. G. Mills)

5th Anti-Aircraft Regiment, Royal Artillery (Lt. Col. Fred D. Field)

7th Battery
17th Light Anti-Aircraft Battery
18th Light Anti-Aircraft Battery
5th HKVDC Battery

965 Defence Battery, Hong Kong–Singapore Royal Artillery (Maj. Basil T. C. Forrester)
1st Regiment, Hong Kong–Singapore Royal Artillery (Maj. John C. Yale (Note: Made temporary Lieutenant-Colonel))

1st Mountain Battery
2nd Mountain Battery
3rd Medium Battery
4th Medium Battery
25th Medium Battery
26th Coast Battery
17th Anti-Aircraft Gun Battery

- Royal Engineers China Command (Col. Esmond H. M. Clifford)

HQ Fortress Engineers
22nd Fortress Company, Royal Engineers (Maj. D. C. E. Grose)
40th Fortress Company, Royal Engineers (Maj. D. I. M. Murray)
Royal Engineers Services

==== Brigades ====
Infantry may be assigned to one of the two defensive brigades:

- Kowloon Infantry Brigade

Brigadier Cedric Wallis

- Hong Kong Infantry Brigade

Brigadier J. K. Lawson

==== Headquarters and support corps ====
British and local forces

- Headquarters, China Command
- Head Quarters
- G
- Admin
- A
- Q
- Command Royal Artillery
- Command Engineers
- Command Signals
- Command RASC
- Command Ordnance
- Medical Service Branch
- Financial Advisor & Army Audit Staff
- Provost Marshall — Corps of Military Police
- 2nd Echelon
- Royal Army Service Corps (Lt. Col. Keble Theodore Andrews-Levinge)
- Royal Army Ordnance Corps (Lt. Col. Robert Macpherson)
- Royal Army Medical Corps
- Royal Corps of Signals (Lt. Col. Eustance Levett)

Canadian

- Canadian staff
- Corps of Military Staff Clerks
- Canadian Provost Corps
- Royal Canadian Army Medical Corps
- Canadian Army Dental Corps
- Canadian Service
- Royal Canadian Corps of Signals
- Royal Canadian Army Service Corps
- Royal Canadian Army Pay Corps
- Canadian Postal Corps
- Royal Canadian Ordnance Corps
- Canadian Chaplains Service
- Canadian Auxiliary Services

Indian

- Indian Hospital Corps
- Indian Medical Service
- Royal Indian Army Service Corps
- Hong Kong Mule Corps RIASC

==== Civilian ====
Civilian forces were as follows:

- MI6
- Hong Kong Police Force (Note: Designated as "combatants" through the Police (Militia Status) Ordinance, Sept 1941) (Commissioner of Police John Pennefather-Evans)

Indian Company, Police Reserve
Chinese Company, Police Reserve

- Fire Brigade (Jack Fitz-Henry)
- Air Raid Precautions
- St. John's Ambulance
- Navy, Army and Air Force Institutes

Auxiliary Services

- Auxiliary Services
- Auxiliary Communications Service
- Auxiliary Conservancy Corps
- Auxiliary Civil Pay and Accounts Service
- Auxiliary Fire Service
- Auxiliary Labour Corps
- Auxiliary Medical Corps
- Auxiliary Nursing Service
- Auxiliary Ordnance Corps
- Auxiliary Quartering Corps
- Auxiliary Public Works Corps
- Auxiliary Rescue and Demolition Corps
- Auxiliary Supply Corps
- Auxiliary Transport Service

=== Naval forces ===
==== Royal Navy ====
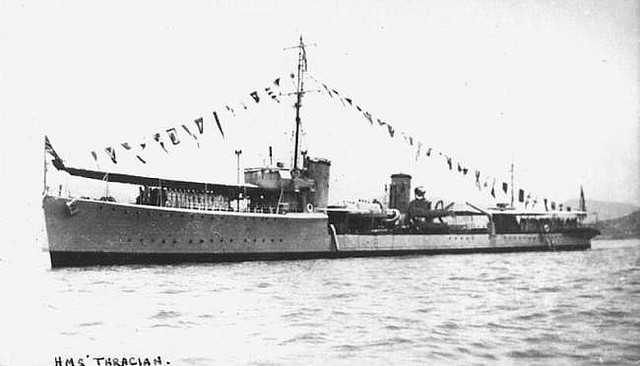
HMS Thracian

Commander: Captain Alfred C. Collinson

The Royal Navy presence were as follows:

- Royal Marine detachment (Maj. Farrington)
- HMS Tamar (shore station)
- HMS Thracian (Lt. Cdr. Arthur Luard Pears)
- HMS Scout (Note: Left for Singapore on the evening of 8 December) (Lt. Cdr. Hedworth Lambton)
- HMS Thanet (Lt. Cdr. Bernard Davies)
- HMS Tern (Lt. John Douglas)
- HMS Robin (Cdr. Hugh M. Montague)
- HMS Redstart (Lt. Cdr. Henry C. S. Collingwood-Selby)
- HMS Cicala (Lt. Cdr. John C. Boldero)
- HMS Moth (Lt. Cdr. R. C. Creer)
- Hong Kong Royal Naval Volunteer Reserve (Lt. Cdr. R. J. D. Vernall)
- Queen Alexandra's Royal Naval Nursing Service
- Royal Naval Dockyard Police
- Hong Kong Dockyard Defence Corps (Maj. D. Campbell)

Auxiliary patrol vessels

- APV Minnie
- APV Margaret
- APV St. Aubin
- APV St. Sampson
- APV Indira
- APV Henriette
- APV Shun Wo
- APV Han Wo
- APV Frosty
- APV Poseidon
- APV Ho Hsing
- APV Teh Hsing
- APV Chun Hsing
- APV Perla

Minor vessels

- APV Stanley
- APV Britannia
- HMS Barlight
- HMS Aldgate
- HMS Watergate
- HMS Cornflower
- Naval Armament Tug Gatling
- Jeanette
- RFA Ebonol
- C410
- Minelayer Man Yeung
- HMT Alliance
- Poet Chaucer
- Waterboat Wave
- SS Matchlock
- Diesel Launch Ah Ming

2nd MTB Flotilla (Lt. Cdr. Gerrard H. Gandy)

- MTB 07 (Lt. R. R. W. Ashby)
- MTB 08 (Lt. L. D. Kilbee)
- MTB 09 (Lt. A. Kennedy)
- MTB 10 (Lt. Cdr. G. H. Gandy)
- MTB 11 (Lt. C. J. Collingwood)
- MTB 12 (Sub-Lt. J. B. Colls)
- MTB 26 (Lt. D. W. Wagstaff)
- MTB 27 (Lt. T. M. Parsons)

==== Merchant Navy ====
Ships of the Merchant Navy:

- SS An Jou
- SS Apoey
- SS Ben Nevis
- SS Cheng Tu
- SS Fausang
- SS Fook On
- SS Glen Moor
- SS Henry Keswick
- SS Hsin Fuli
- SS Kanchow
- SS Kau Tung
- SS Mausang
- SS Nanning
- SS Patricia Moller
- SS Shun Chih
- SS Soochow
- SS St. Vincent De Paul
- SS Tai Ming
- SS Taishan
- MV Tantalus
- SS Tung On
- SS Whithorn
- SS Yat Shing

=== Air forces ===
- Fleet Air Arm, Royal Navy (Lt. P. J. Milner-Barry)

Supermarine Walrus L2259
Supermarine Walrus L2819

- Hong Kong Station, Royal Air Force (Wng. Cdr. Humphrey G. Sullivan)

Vickers Vildebeest K2924
Vickers Vildebeest K2818
Vickers Vildebeest K6370

- HKVDC Flight (Sq. Ldr. Donald "Sammy" Hill)

1 x Avro 621 Tutor
2 x Hornet Moth
2 x Cadet biplanes

== Japanese ==
=== Ground forces ===
The Japanese ground forces consisted of the following units:

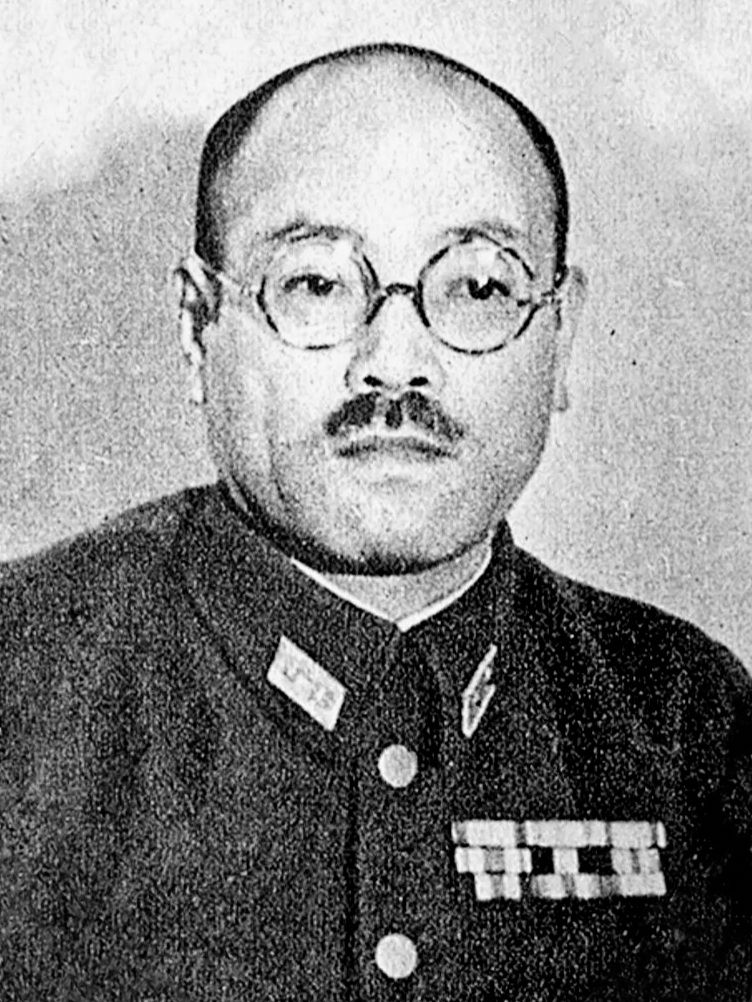
Lt. Gen. Takashi Sakai, Commander of the 23rd Army

- 23rd Army

Commander: Lieutenant General Takashi Sakai
Chief of Staff: Major General Tadamichi Kuribayashi
Deputy Chief of Staff: Major General Keishichiro Higuchi

- 38th Division

Commander: Lieutenant General Tadayoshi Sano

- Infantry HQ, 38th Division (Maj. Gen. Takeo Itō)

228th Infantry Regiment (Col. Sadashichi Doi)
229th Infantry Regiment (Col. Ryosaburo Tanaka)
230th Infantry Regiment (Col. Toshinari Shōji)
38th Mountain Gun Regiment (Col. Takekichi Kamiyoshi)
38th Engineers Regiment (Lt. Col. Tsuneō Iwabuchi)
38th Logistic Regiment (Lt. Col. Shūichi Yabuta)
19th Independent Engineer Regiment (Lt. Col. Shoshirō Inukai)
20th Independent Engineer Regiment (Col. Kiyoshi Suzukawa)
2nd Company, 14th Independent Engineering Regiment (Maj. Eiichi Kusagi)
21st Independent Mortar Battalion (Maj. Shigeo Okamoto)
Signal Corps (Maj. Ryōichi Itō)

- Araki Detachment (Col. Masatoshi Araki)

66th Infantry Regiment – Less 1 Company

- Attached Force

10th Independent Mountain Gun Regiment (Col. Rikichirō Sawamoto)
20th Independent Mountain Gun Battalion (Lt. Col. Jirō Kajimatsu)
2nd Quick-Firing Gun Battalion (Lt. Col. Takeo Ōno)
5th Quick-Firing Gun Battalion (Maj. Jirō Aoki)

- 1st Artillery Group (Lt. Gen. Kaneo Kitajima)

1st Heavy Artillery Regiment (Col. Masayoshi Hayakawa)
14th Heavy Field Gun Regiment (Col. Takeaki Satō)
2nd Independent Heavy Artillery Battalion (Maj. Kiyotoshi Kanamaru)
3rd Independent Heavy Artillery Battalion (Lt. Col. Hitomi Kanmei)
2nd Heavy Mortar Battalion (Maj. Deiichi Namimatsu)

==== Other divisional support ====
- Armour Squadron (Capt. Jūrō Atami)
- 3rd Transport Regiment (Lt. Col. Otokazu Kobayashi) – Only 3 companies
- 19th Independent Transport Company
- 20th Independent Transport Company
- 21st Independent Transport Company
- 1st River Crossing Material Company, 9th Division (Lt. Hiroshi Furumori)
- 2nd River Crossing Material Company, 9th Division (Lt. Eda Asao)
- Ordnance team (Capt. Sadaharu Koide)
- 5th Field Gas Company (Capt. Magosaburō Suzuki)
- 18th Field Gas Company (Lt. Isamu Morimoto
- Veterinary (Vet. Maj. Jiro Hayashi)
- 1st Field Hospital (Dr. Maj. Toshimi Suzuki)
- 2nd Field Hospital (Dr. Maj. Takuzō Itō)
- Field Pigeon Carrier Company
- South China MP Platoon (Maj. Kennosuke Noma)
- Medical unit
- Medical unit, 51st Division (Col. Otokazu Hattori) – Only 1/3 of the unit
- 17th Field Water Purification and Supply Unit
- Army signal corps
- Two radio signal platoons
- One wire signal platoon

=== Naval forces ===
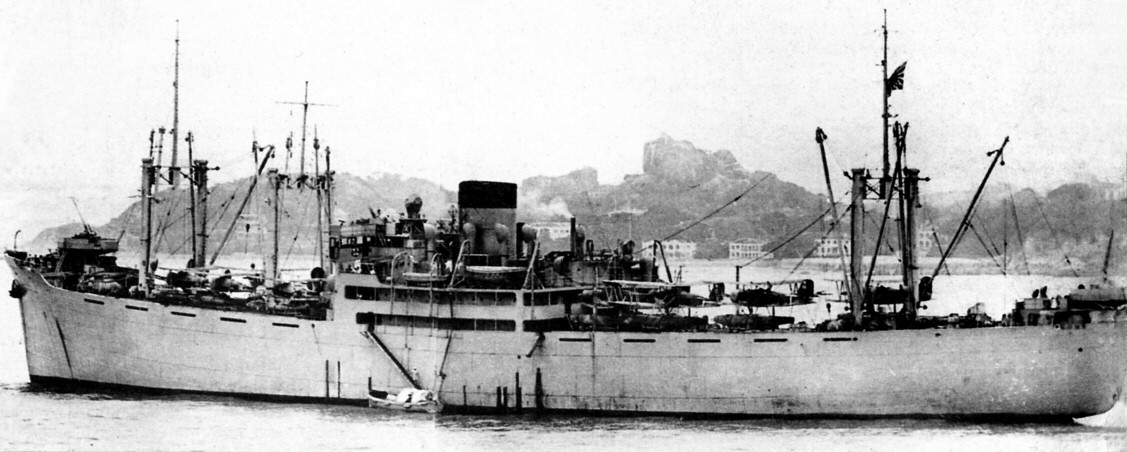
Seaplane tender Kamikawa Maru

- 2nd China Fleet

Commander: Vice Admiral Masaichi Niimi
Chief of Staff: Brigadier Yasuo Yasuba

- Kamikawa Maru

2 x Kawanishi E7K
3 x Kugisho B3Y

Bombardment Group:

- Isuzu
- Tsuga
- Ikazuchi
- Inazuma
- Kasasagi
- Hiyodori
- Kari
- Kiji
- Tosho Maru

Attack Group:

- Uji
- Hashidate
- Saga
- Arashiyama Maru
- Tsukushi Maru
- Asashi Maru
- Momo Maru
- Ryujin Maru
- Choun Maru No. 7
- Shinsei Maru
- Sozan Maru
- Azuchi Maru
- San Luis Maru
- Shinko Maru
- Toen Maru

=== Air forces ===
- 23rd Army Air Unit, 1st Air Group
  - 45th Flying Sentai (Col. Shuji Habu) – 29 x Kawasaki Ki-32
  - 10th Independent Chutai (Maj. Akira Takatsuki) – 13 x Nakajima Ki-27
  - 18th Independent Chutai (Capt. Minoru Kobayashi) – 3 x Mitsubishi Ki-15
  - 44th Independent Squadron (Capt. Yoshio Naito) – 6 x Tachikawa Ki-36
  - 47th Air-Field Battalion (Maj. Sadayu Uemura)
  - 67th Air-Field Company, 67th Air Field Battalion (Capt. Nobunaga Kodama)
  - 57th Air-Field Company (2nd Lt. Mitsuhiro Makita) – Elements
- 14th Flying Sentai
- Kanoya Air Group

== See also ==
- List of orders of battle
- British Forces Overseas Hong Kong
- C Force

== Bibliography ==
- Banham, Tony (2003). Not the Slightest Chance: The Defence of Hong Kong, 1941. UBC Press. ISBN 978-0-7748-1045-6.
- Kwong, Chi Man; Tsoi, Yiu Lun (2013). 孤獨前哨: 太平洋戰爭中的香港戰役 [Exposed Outpost: the Battle of Hong Kong in the Pacific War] (in Chinese). Hong Kong: Cosmos Books Ltd. ISBN 9789888254347.
- Lai, Benjamin (2014-06-20). Hong Kong 1941–45: First strike in the Pacific War. Bloomsbury Publishing. ISBN 978-1-78200-269-7.
