= Cornflower (disambiguation) =

Cornflower is a flowering annual plant Centaurea cyanus.

Cornflower or Cornflowers may also refer to:

- Centaurea montana, the perennial cornflower
- Chicory, the herbaceous plant Cichorium intybus, also known as cornflower
- Psephellus dealbatus, known as Persian cornflower or whitewash cornflower
- Brunonia a perennial or annual herb that grows widely across Australia, commonly known as the blue pincushion or native cornflower
- Centaurea depressa, an annual plant native to southwestern and central Asia, known as the low cornflower
- Cornflower blue, a shade of medium-to-light blue
- Cornflowers (painting), by Sergei Ivanovich Osipov
- HMS Cornflower, multiple ships of the Royal Navy baring this name
- Cornflower, a fictional character in the Redwall series of books
- Habernitsa a noon demon in Slavic mythology, referred to in English as "Cornflower Wraith"

== See also ==
- Cornflour (disambiguation)
- Gul Makai (disambiguation) (Urdu for cornflower)
- Coneflower
