= Japanese ship Hashidate =

Three ships of the Japanese Navy have been named Hashidate:

- Japanese cruiser Hashidate, a Matsushima-class cruiser launched in 1891 and scrapped in 1927
- Japanese gunboat Hashidate, a Hashidate-class gunboat launched in 1939 and sunk in 1944
- JS Hashidate, an accommodation ship launched in 1999 and in active service as of 2020.
