= Japanese gunboat Uji =

Two gunboats of the Imperial Japanese Navy were named Uji:

- Japanese gunboat Uji (1903), a gunboat launched in 1903 and scrapped in 1936
- Japanese gunboat Uji (1940), a Hashidate-class gunboat launched in 1940. She was transferred to the Republic of China as Chang Zhi in 1945. In 1949 she was captured by the People's Republic of China and renamed Nan Chang.
