= HMS Cornflower =

Two ships of the Royal Navy have been named HMS Cornflower :

- HMS Cornflower (1916), an Arabis-class sloop launched in 1916 and broken up in 1940
- HMS Cornflower (1940), a river steamer launched in 1927, originally SS Tai Hing, lost in 1941
- HMS Cornflower (1950), was an Algerine-class minesweeper laid down as HMCS Hespeler but renamed Lysander on transfer to the Royal Navy in 1943. She was renamed Cornflower in 1950 and broken up in 1957
