= Etchingham (disambiguation) =

Etchingham is an English village in East Sussex. Etchingham may also refer to:

== Places ==
- Etchingham railway station, railway station on the Hastings Line in East Sussex, England

== People ==
- Julie Etchingham, English television journalist
- Kathy Etchingham, British/Irish personality from the Swinging London era of the 1960s
- Seán Etchingham (1868–1923), Irish Sinn Féin politician

== Other uses ==
- HMS Etchingham (M2625), one of 93 ships of the Ham-class of inshore minesweepers
- Etchingham Steam Band, 1970s English folk group formed by Ashley Hutchings
