= Patacucci =

Type of fresh pasta

Patacucci, also known as zavardoni or giugetti, are a traditional type of fresh pasta from the provinces of Rimini, Forlì-Cesena, and Ravenna, consisting of squares or diamonds of rather irregular shape, obtained from a thick dough, prepared with water, wheat flour, corn flour, and salt.

== Description ==
After boiling, they are traditionally seasoned with a bean sauce, or more recently, with a sausage sauce, prepared based on a sauté (chopped). They are also consumed in soup, or simmered with a spoon.

Zavardoni, also known as zavardone and, in Romagnol, zavardoun, are the larger variant, typical of the Rimini area, particularly the Verucchio region. The dialect term zavardoun indicates a neglected person. They are typically consumed dry, with tomato sauce and a generous grating of sheep's cheese or with sausage sauce.

== See also ==
- List of pasta
