= Japanese gunboat Uji (1903) =

Imperial Japanese Navy gunboat

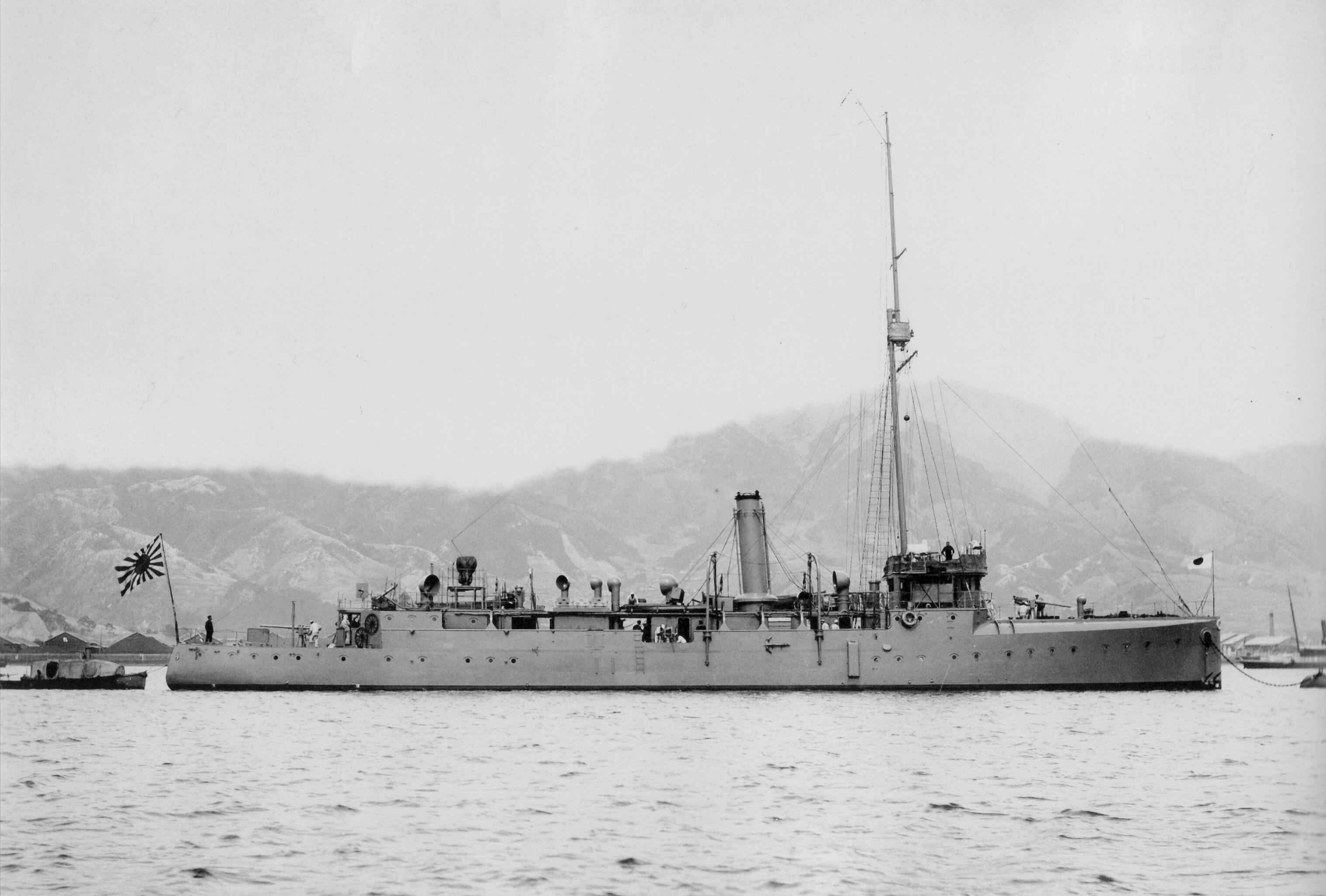
- Japanese gunboat Uji off Kure, 1901

History

Empire of Japan
- Name: Uji
- Ordered: 1901
- Builder: Kure Naval Arsenal
- Laid down: September 1902
- Launched: 11 August 1903
- Commissioned: 11 August 1904
- Stricken: 1 April 1936
- Fate: Scrapped 25 August 1936

General characteristics
- Type: Gunboat
- Displacement: 620 long tons (630 t)
- Length: 57.8 m (190 ft)
- Beam: 8.4 m (27 ft 7 in)
- Draught: 2.1 m (6 ft 11 in)
- Propulsion: reciprocating steam engine; 2 shafts, 4 boilers; 1,000 hp (750 kW)
- Speed: 13.0 knots (15.0 mph; 24.1 km/h)
- Range: 156 tons coal
- Complement: 80
- Armament: 4 × 80 mm (3 in) QF guns; 3 × machine guns

Uji (宇治) was an early steam gunboat, serving in the Imperial Japanese Navy. She was named after the city of Uji in Kyoto Prefecture. She should not be confused with the later World War II period Hashidate-class Uji with the same name

== History ==
Following the First Sino-Japanese War, the Imperial Japanese Navy developed a requirement for a shallow-draft coastal patrol vessel for patrols off the coast of China in addition to the existing Ōshima. For her design, the Japanese turned to the Royal Navy’s Bramble-class gunboat, the lead ship of which (HMS Bramble) was launched in 1898.

Uji was a metal-hulled gunboat with a triple expansion reciprocating steam engine with two boilers driving two screws. She lacked the full sailing rig of Ōshima and previous Japanese gunboats. Uji was laid down at the Kure Naval Arsenal in September 1902 and launched on 14 March 1903. She was completed on 11 August 1904 and commissioned into the Imperial Japanese Navy as a second class gunboat.

Uji was completed after the start of the Russo-Japanese War, but her small size and firepower, and her lack of open ocean capability limited her operations to patrols of coastal areas of the Yellow Sea. However, she was assigned a role in the crucial final Battle of Tsushima against the Imperial Russian Navy. After the war, she was based at Shanghai and assigned to protection of Japanese citizens and commercial interests in the inland waters of China. However, her draught of 2 metres (6.6 ft) limited her area of operations to the lower reaches of the Yangtze River. Uji was removed from the active navy list on 1 April 1936 and was scrapped on 25 August 1936.
