= Lady Midday =

Slavic mythological creature

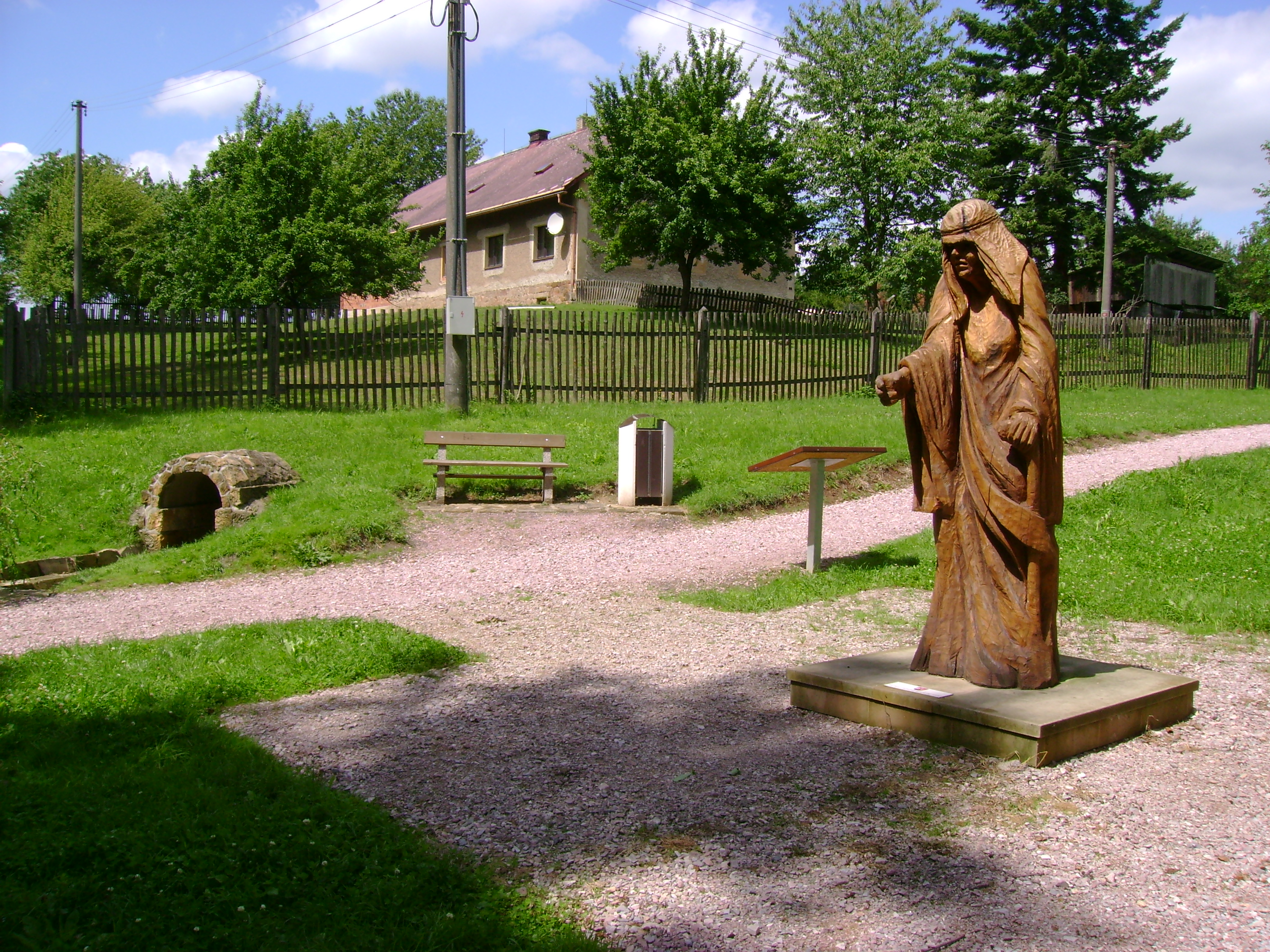
Statue depicting "Lady Midday" in Miletín, Jičín District, the Czech Republic

Poludnitsa (from: Polden or Poluden, 'half-day' or 'midday') is a mythical character common to the various Slavic countries of Eastern Europe. She is referred to as Południca in Polish, Полудниця in Ukrainian, Полудница (Poludnitsa) in Serbian, Bulgarian and Russian, Polednice in Czech, Pśezpołdnica in Lower Sorbian, Poludnica in Slovak, Připołdnica in Upper Sorbian, and Полознича (Poloznicha) in Komi, Chirtel Ma in Yiddish. The plural form of this word is poludnitsy (or poludnici). Poludnitsa is a noon demon in Slavic mythology. She can be referred to in English as "Lady Midday", "Noonwraith" or "noon witch". She was usually pictured as a young woman dressed in white that roamed field bounds. She assailed folk working at noon, causing heatstrokes and aches in the neck; sometimes she even caused madness.

In some accounts, she symbolizes the midday star, thereby being the sister of Zarya-Zarenitsa (the morning star; also called Utrenica), Vechorka (the evening star; also called Wieczornica/Vechernitsa) and Kupalnitsa (the night star; also called Nocnica/Nochnitsa); Poludnitsa is the second youngest among the sisters, with Zarya-Zarenitsa being the youngest and Kupalnitsa being the oldest.

== Legend ==
Poludnitsa, who makes herself evident in the middle of hot summer days, takes the form of whirling dust clouds and carries a scythe, sickle or shears; most likely the shears would be of an older style, not akin to modern scissors. She will stop people in the field to ask them difficult questions or engage them in conversation. If anyone fails to answer a question or tries to change the subject, she will cut off their head or strike them with illness. She may appear as an old hag, a beautiful woman, or a 12-year-old girl, and she was useful in scaring children away from valuable crops. She is only seen on the hottest part of the day and is a personification of a sun-stroke.

According to some northern Russian regions, Poludnitsa has a giant frying pan in her hands, with which she either blocks the rye from the scorching sun's rays, or burns the rye along with the herbs during the flowering period. She may also appear at midnight and show a person how to find a flower that can make them invisible, as was believed in the Arkhangelsk Governorate.

Poludnitsa, according to beliefs, loves to dance. If she sees a girl lying down to rest in the field, she will wake her up and begin to persuade her to dance. If the girl agrees, she will be forced to dance until the evening's dawn. Poludnitsa cannot be beaten in dancing; however, if such a girl is found, the noon spirit will present her with a rich dowry.

Slavonic spirits and deities remained a popular element of rural Polish folklore at the turn of the 19th and 20th century, as shown by Władysław Reymont in his Nobel Prize-winning novel Chłopi (The Peasants). Its story takes place during the 1880s in Congress Poland and follows the everyday life of the peasantry in a typical Polish village. In the tenth chapter of book two, some of the characters gather together to exchange stories and legends, in one of which the południca is mentioned twice alongside other traditionally Slavic beings.

== Other mythology ==
In Wendish mythology, Přezpołdnica (in Lower Sorbian, Připołdnica in Upper Sorbian) is known as Mittagsfrau ("Lady Midday") among German speakers of Eastern Germany's Lusatia (Sorbian Łužica, German Lausitz) and in the now only German-speaking parts of what used to be the larger region of Old Lusatia. Farther north and west in formerly predominantly Slavic-speaking areas of Germany, especially in the state of Brandenburg (Low Saxon Branneborg, Sorbian Braniborska), a related mythological spirit appears to be the Roggenmuhme ("lady of the rye") that makes children disappear when they search for flowers in among the tall grain plants on hot summer days. In the Altmark, it is the Regenmöhme "with her heat" that will abduct ill-behaved children, and in the formerly Polabian-speaking heath region around Lunenburg (German Lüneburg) in Lower Saxony, the Low Saxon (Low German) name of this bugbear is Kornwief (formerly spelled Kornwyf, meaning «woman of the corn» or «lady of the grain plants»).

In the vicinity of Prudnik in Upper Silesia, people believed in the Cornflower Wraith (Polish Chabernica), a demon similar to Lady Midday. She was usually pictured as a young slim woman dressed in azure with cornflowers in her hair, that roamed field bounds during midday. She was angered by people who trampled the grain or used sharp tools. Those, who she thought deserved punishment, were put to sleep with her whisper, after which she caused them headache, paralysis or low back pain. Sometimes she attacked her victims by breaking their arms, legs or neck. To avoid the wrath of the Cornflower Wraith, a worker had to take a break from work during the midday of Angelus.

== See also ==
- The Noon Witch
- The Noonday Demon
- Works related to The Mid-day Witch at Wikisource
