= JS Hashidate =

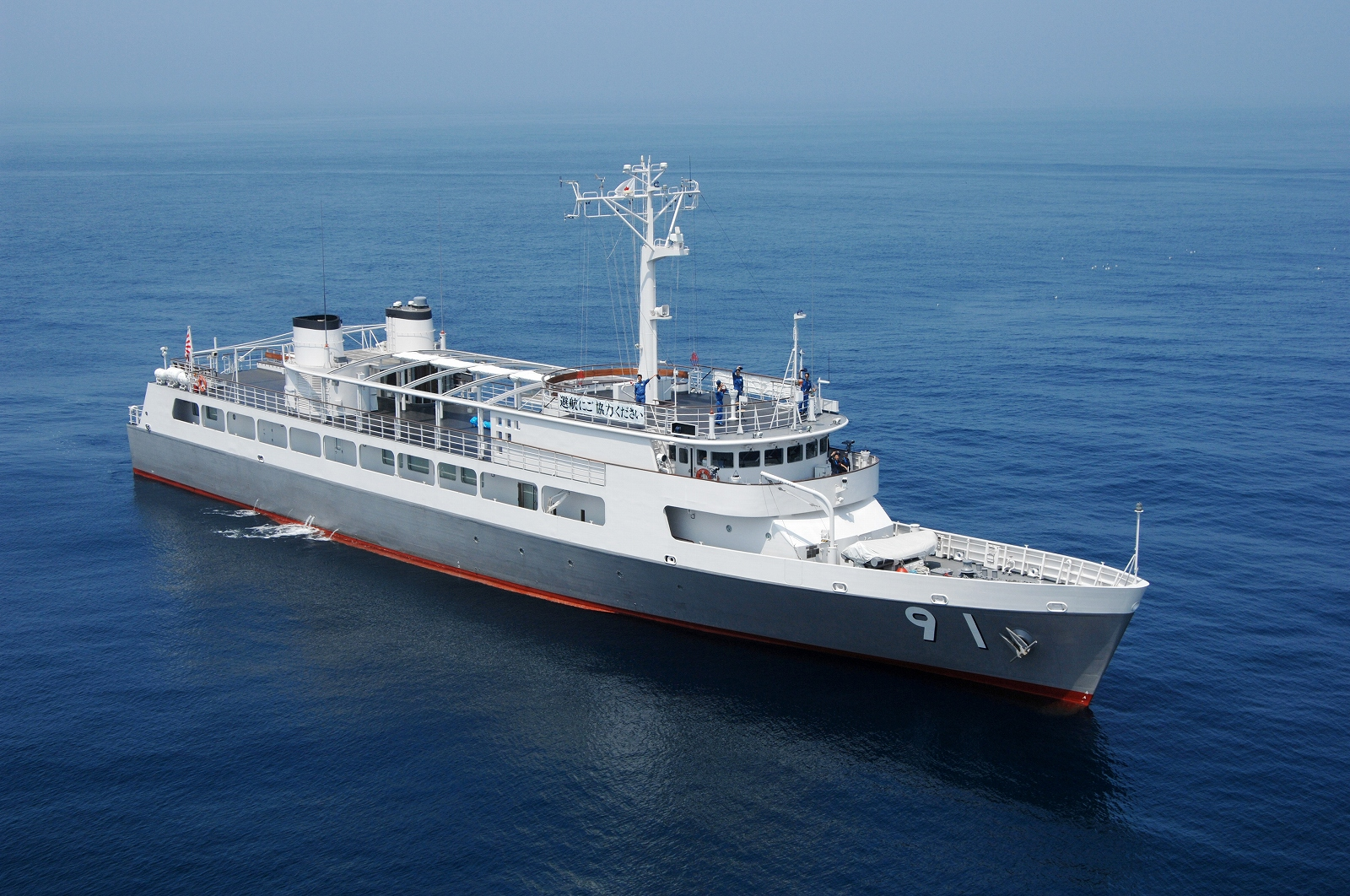
- JS Hashidate

History

Japan
- Name: Hashidate; (はしだて)
- Namesake: Hashidate (1939)
- Builder: Hitachi Zosen Corporation, Kanagawa Plant
- Cost: ¥69 billion
- Laid down: 26 October 1998
- Launched: 26 July 1999
- Commissioned: 30 November 1999
- Home port: Yokosuka
- Identification: Pennant number: ASY-91; MMSI number: 431999642; Callsign: JSOQ
- Status: Active

General characteristics
- Type: Accommodation ship
- Displacement: 400 tonnes (394 long tons), Standard; 490 tonnes (482 long tons), Full load
- Length: 62.0 m (203 ft 5 in)
- Beam: 9.4 m (30 ft 10 in)
- Draught: 2.0 m (6 ft 7 in)
- Depth: 4.6 m (15 ft 1 in)
- Propulsion: 2 x Niigata Engineering Co., Ltd. 16V16FX diesel engine; 5,500 hp (4,100 kW); 2 x shafts; Bow thrusters
- Speed: Surfaced: 20 kn (37 km/h; 23 mph)
- Complement: 29

JS Hashidate (ASY-91) is an accommodation ship of the Japanese Maritime Self-Defense Force. She was commissioned on 30 November 1999.

== Construction and career ==
Hashidate was laid down on 26 October 1998 at the Hitachi Shipbuilding Kanagawa Plant as Plan No. 91 of 1997, launched on 26 July 1999, and commissioned on 30 November 1999. Deployed to Yokosuka under the control of the Yokosuka District Force.

On 19 August 2009, participated in the joint disaster relief training of the JMSDF / East Nippon Expressway Aqualine Management Office at the Umihotaru parking area of Tokyo Bay Aqualine. After the training, it was opened to the public and 1000 people were on board.

In response to the Great East Japan Earthquake caused by the Tohoku-Pacific Ocean Earthquake that occurred on 11 March 2011, 75 minutes after the earthquake, she departed Yokosuka urgently for disaster dispatch.

Participated in transportation training for people who have difficulty returning home in Tokyo on 3 February 2012. She transported people who had difficulty returning home from Ariake Pier to Chiba.

On 18 May 2016, she entered the Maizuru base for the first time for student education, western resistance training, and disaster relief dispatch for the Maizuru Education Corps. On 24 May, she left Maizuru base and headed for Sasebo. On the way, she sailed off the coast of Amanohashidate, which was the origin of the name.

== Gallery ==
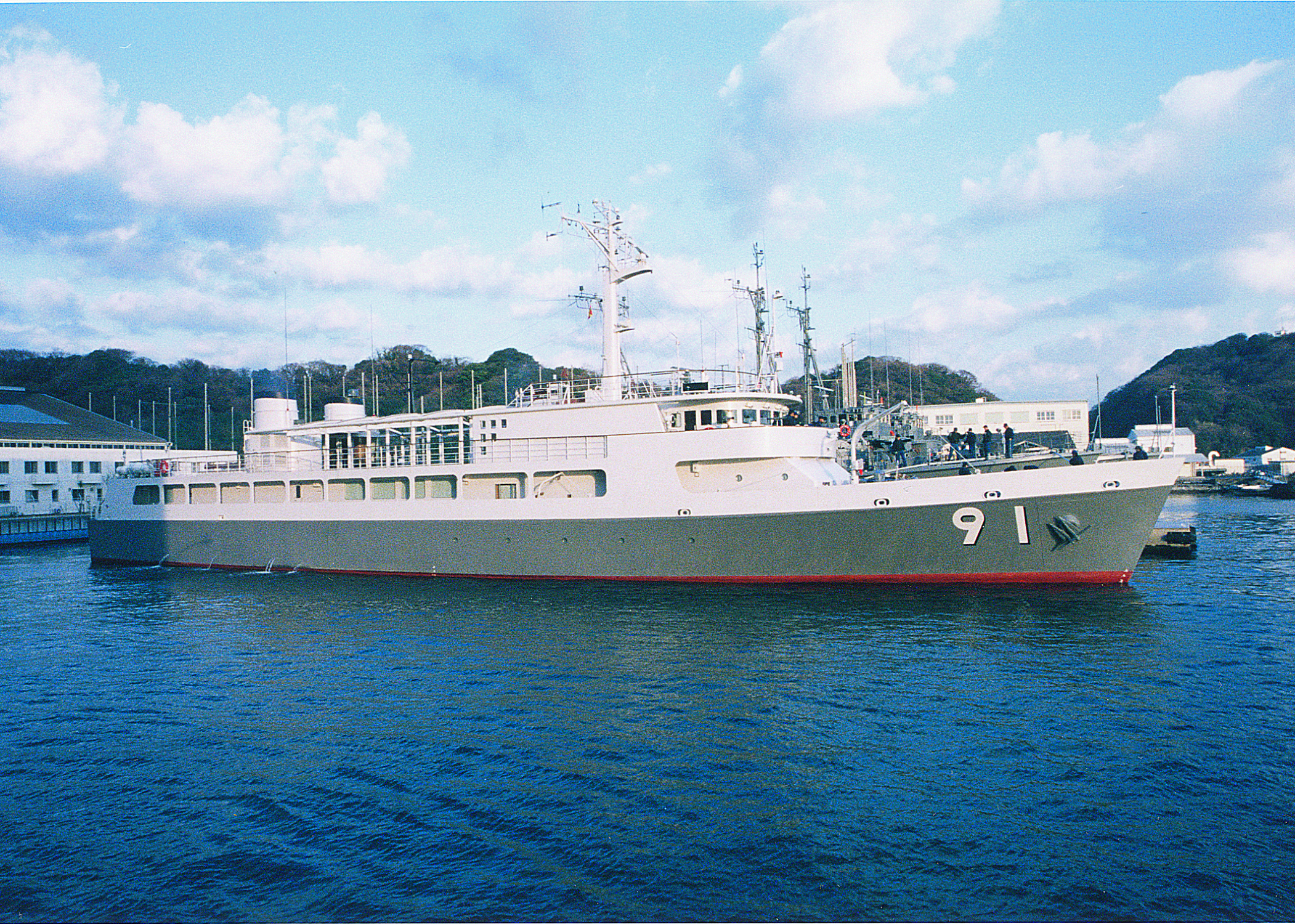
JS Hashidate, date unknown.

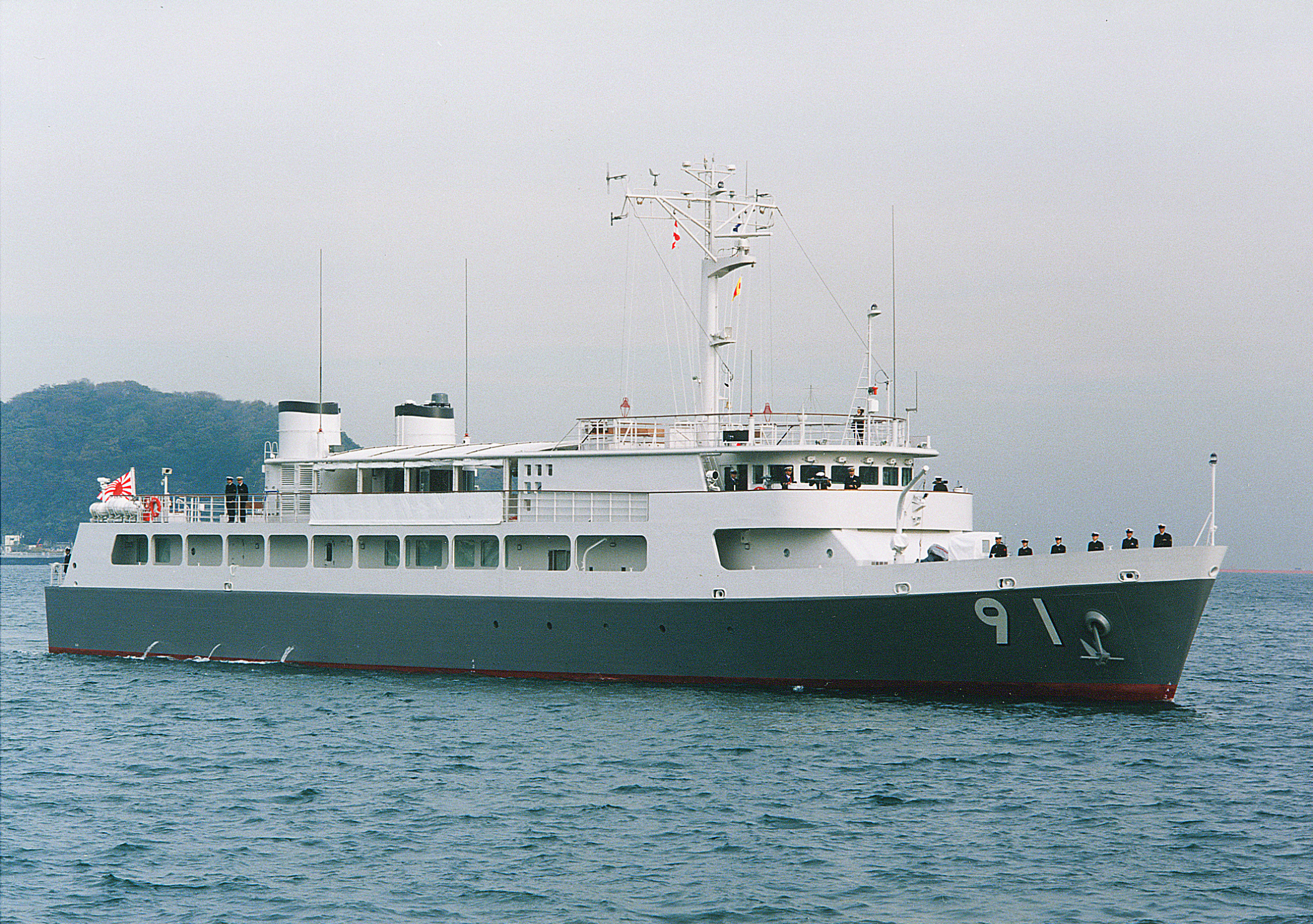
JS Hashidate, date unknown.

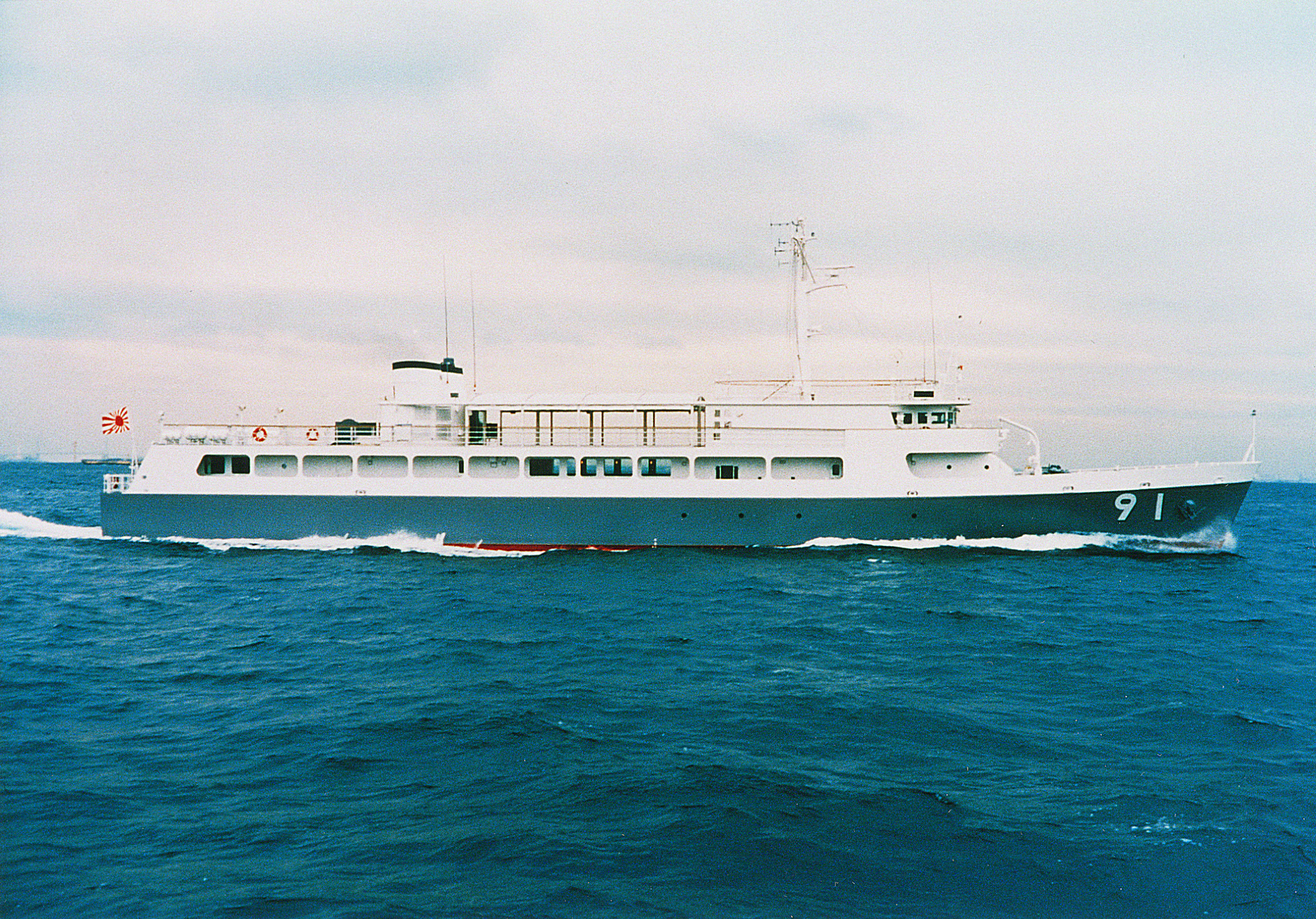
JS Hashidate, date unknown.

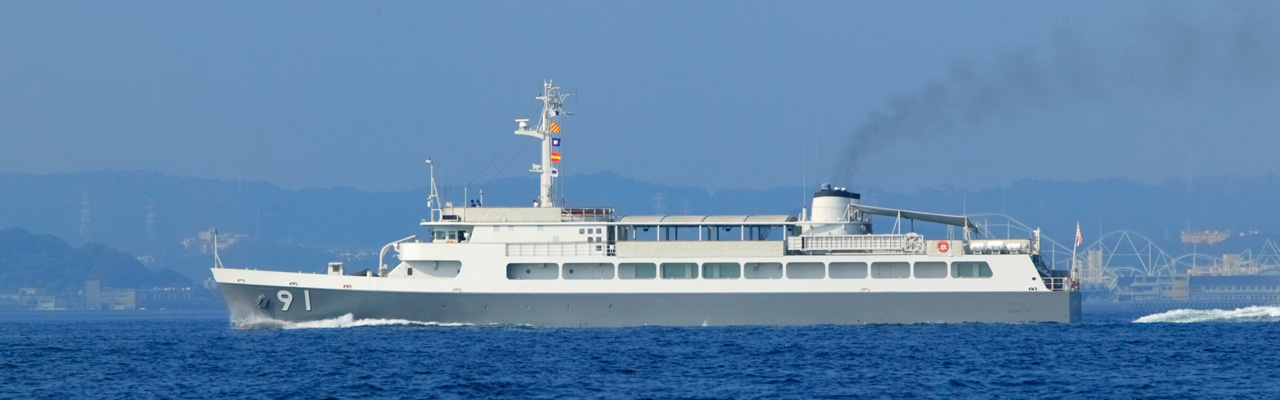
JS Hashidate on 17 October 2007.

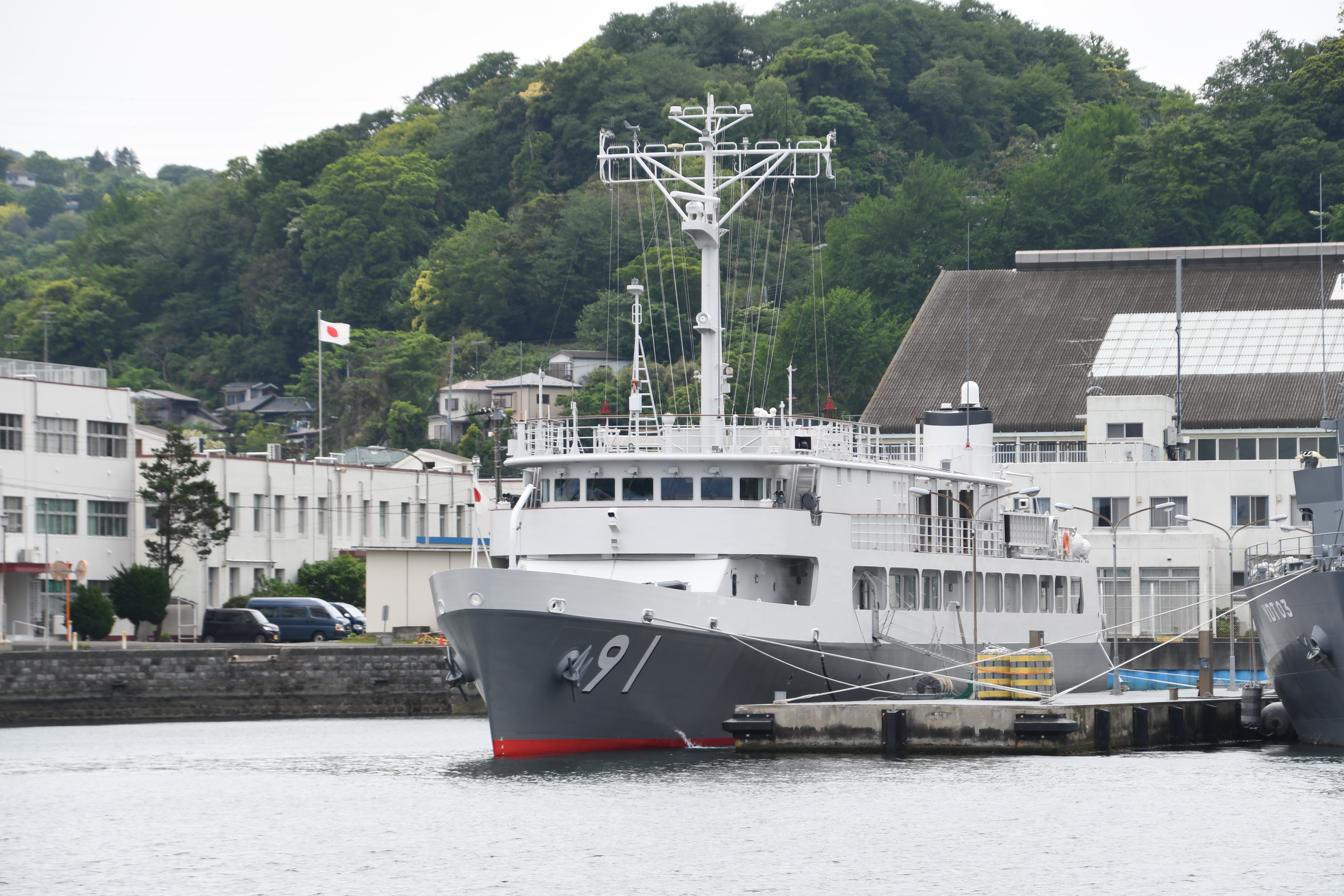
JS Hashidate at Yokosuka on 30 April 2018.

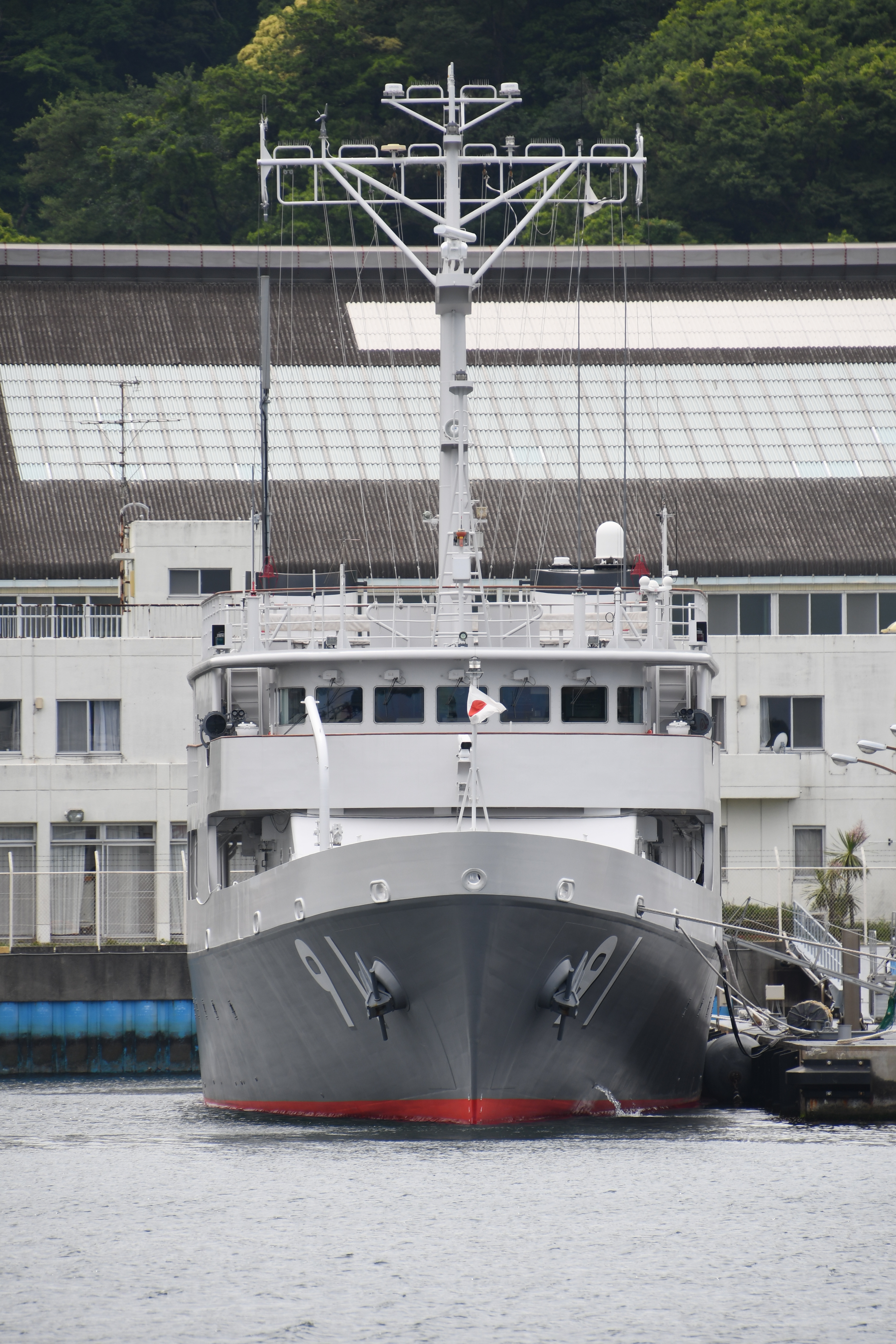
JS Hashidate at Yokosuka on 30 April 2018.

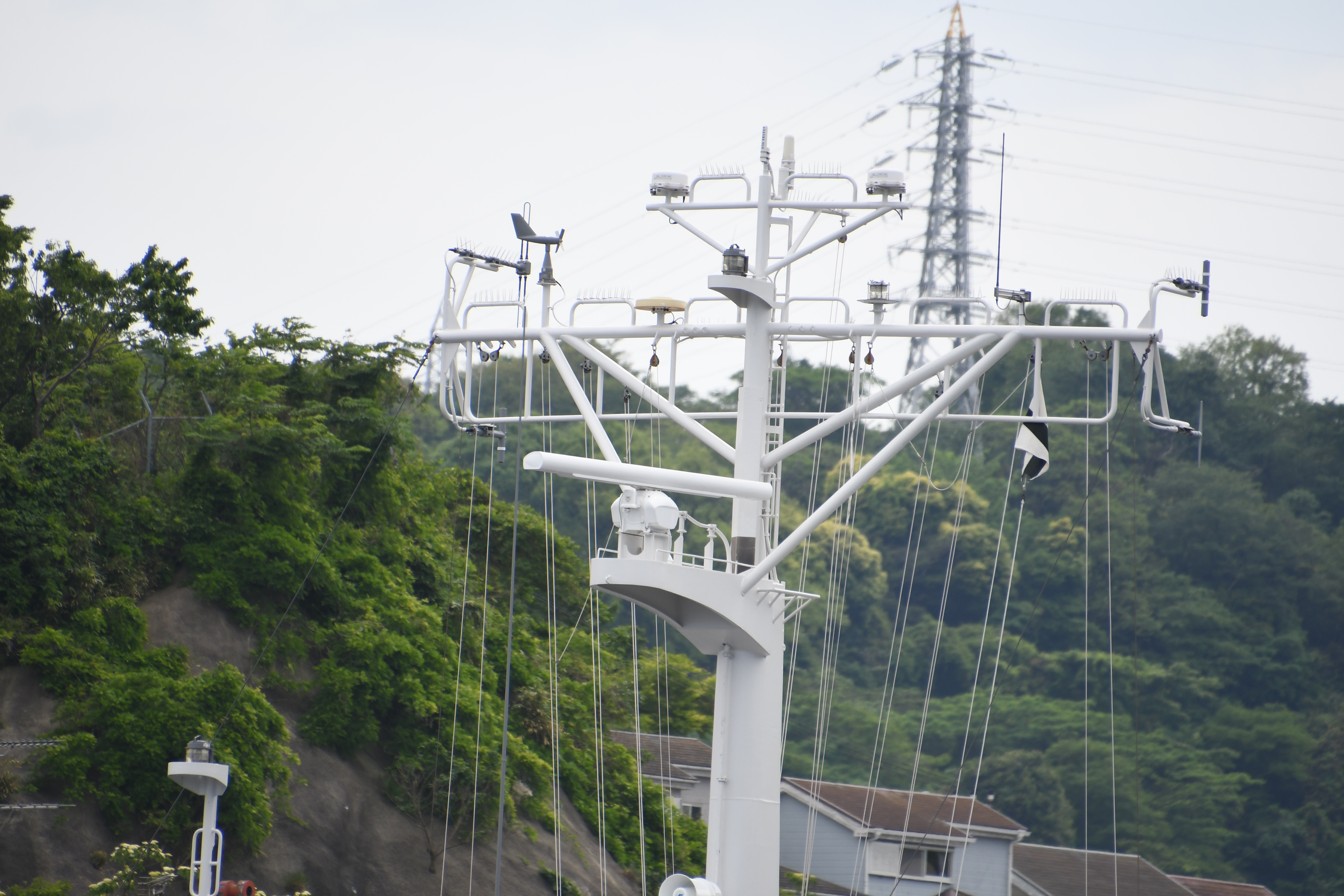
JS Hashidate at Yokosuka on 30 April 2018.
