= Hong Kong Naval Volunteer Force =

Volunteer navy based in Hong Kong

- Active: 1933–1967
- Country: British Hong Kong
- Branch: Royal Navy
- Type: local auxiliary navy
- Garrison/HQ: Hong Kong Defence Force
- Nickname(s): The Wavy Navy
- Motto(s): Fortiter et recte (Boldly and rightly)
- Engagements: Battle of Hong Kong

The Hong Kong Naval Volunteer Force (HKNVR) was a volunteer navy established in 1933. In 1939, it was granted the Royal Naval Volunteer Reserve status and was renamed Hong Kong Royal Naval Volunteer Reserve (HKRNVR). In 1959, it was renamed the Hong Kong Royal Naval Reserve (HKRNR) after bring absorbed directly into the Royal Naval Reserve. It was disbanded in 1967.

== Establishment ==
In 1922, the British Empire signed the Washington Naval Treaty. Article XIX of the treaty prohibited the construction of new naval bases in the Pacific, thus limiting the capability of the Royal Navy in East Asia. A local naval reserve was suggested to alleviate the limitations of the treaty, but was objected by the Legislative Council on financial grounds. The Hong Kong Volunteer Defence Corps also objected to the formation of a naval reserve, fearing that a rival volunteer force could reduce its recruitment. In 1933, Hong Kong Commodore-in-Charge Frank Elliot convinced the council to establish the naval force. To recruit potential members, Elliot met with members of the Royal Hong Kong Yacht Club. The colony also celebrated a "Navy Week", coinciding with Trafalgar Day, which included open ships and naval yards, and mock-up engagements with an enemy submarine and a pirate junk. London press reported that the celebrations raised tension in the Pacific, and the Navy had to distance themselves from the association of jingoism.

== 1933–1939 ==
The initial recruits for the unit numbered around 50 men. Both Europeans and Chinese were recruited into the HKNVR, and unlike other colonial naval forces, the navy was not divide on ethnic lines. However, this equality was only superficial in nature. Influenced by the seamen's strike of 1922, the Royal Navy viewed Chinese seamen as unreliable and carrying a "communist element." It was decided that the policies of racial equality could not be maintained in case of war. Should a full mobilization occur, all Europeans were to be automatically promoted to Petty Officers, to give them command over the Chinese servicemen. European and "Asiatic" pay and allowances were also different.

On 31 March 1934, the Royal Navy loaned HMS Cornflower permanently to the HKNVR to serve as a drill ship. Elliot replaced the crest and motto of the ship to that of Clan Eliott (Elliot's ancestor Charles Elliot had also been the first Administrator of Hong Kong). Before the war, the HKNVR included 380 men. The unit became known as the "Wavy Navy", due to the wavy stripes on the uniform sleeves of officers.

== Second World War ==
Following the outbreak of war in 1939, the HKNVR was granted the Royal Naval Volunteer Reserve status and was renamed Hong Kong Royal Naval Volunteer Reserve (HKRNVR). Morale was low during wartime: British seamen wanted to participate in active engagements with the enemy closer to their home country, and Chinese seamen were not concerned about the far-removed European war. On 17 August 1940, Ho Tung loaned SS Tai Hing to the HKRNVR for the duration of the war. It replaced Cornflower as headquarters of the force, and on 7 September, Tai Hing was renamed HMS Cornflower. The unit served and operated seamlessly with the Royal Navy, and was mostly used for mine warfare and patrolling.

On 8 December 1941, Japan invaded Hong Kong. At the time, the force numbered 800 men. During battle, the unit saw mass desertions. The whole crew of HMS Perla "bolted" after the adjacent HMS Indira was sunk. The morale worsened on 11 December, when seamen were ordered to fire upon fellow Chinese, whose junks were wrongly-accused of carrying Japanese infiltrators. The seamen also feared for the safety of their family, who had not been moved to safe houses due to the abruptness of the invasion. The fears were made worse when Kowloon was evacuated on 13 December, leaving the fate of many on the peninsula unknown. Many seamen deserted to check on their families. On 16 December, the replacement crew of HMS Minnie witnessed a large scale air-raid and immediately refused to serve. As a Japanese victory drew nearer, orders were sent out to have all ships in the harbour scuttled. Several HKRNVR members of the 2nd MTB Flotilla refused the order, and with their motor torpedo boats, aided Admiral Chan Chak in his escape to China.

The Hong Kong garrison surrendered on 25 December, and was occupied by Japan until Admiral Cecil Harcourt accepted the Japanese surrender in 1945.

== Post War ==
For a time, the Admiralty favoured the formation of a permanent navy, but the idea was rejected by Governor Alexander Grantham, who preferred investing in a stronger water police instead. Much of the pre-war morale issues lingered, exacerbated by concerns regarding Britain's commitment to preserve the colony against a raising China. The all-volunteer nature of the HKRNVR attracted Europeans who seek to avoid compulsory call-ups from the rival Royal Hong Kong Regiment: If they failed to comply with the HKRNVR training, they would simply be discharged, while they would have been prosecuted if they were in the Royal Hong Kong Regiment. The disproportionately high number of Europeans compared to Chinese seamen also raised racial and cultural issues. Many Europeans were unable to direct the Chinese personnel due to the language barrier, and had to carry out work themselves. During the 1956 riots, the HKRNVR was not mobilized due to concerns about the loyalties of Chinese seamen.

In 1959, all colonial Royal Naval Volunteer Reserves were absorbed into the Royal Naval Reserve, and the HKRNVR was renamed the Hong Kong Royal Naval Reserve (HKRNR). The unit was disbanded on 12 March 1967, due to the financial cost of maintaining warships and relative inactivity and ineffectiveness of the unit. The members were absorbed into the Naval Control of Shipping (NCS) unit of the Royal Naval Reserve in Hong Kong.

== Vessels ==
From 1934 to 1940, the unit was headquartered on HMS Cornflower. In 1940, she was replaced by HMS Cornflower II (ex-SS Tai Hing).

During the Second World War, they operate the following auxiliary patrol vessels:

- HMS St Aubin
- HMS St Sampson
- HMS Minnie
- HMS Margaret
- HMS Henriette
- HMS Perla
- HMS Indira
- HMS Shunley
- HMS Poseidon
- HMS Britannia
- HMS Swanley
- HMS Stanley
- HMS Diana

The unit also commanded MTB 7, 8, 12, 26 and 27 in the 2nd MTB Flotilla.

In 1951 the unit was presented with the minesweeper HMS Lysander, which was renamed as HMS Cornflower and used as a training ship.

After the war, the unit operated the minesweepers HMS Cardinham and HMS Etchingham, which were on free loan from the Admiralty, until the unit's disbandment in 1967.
