= HMS Cardinham =

Minesweeper of the Royal Navy

History

United Kingdom
- Name: HMS Cardinham
- Namesake: Cardinham
- Builder: Herd & McKenzie
- Launched: 24 June 1952
- Completed: 17 July 1953
- Fate: Sold for breaking, 1967

General characteristics
- Class & type: Ham class minesweeper
- Type: Minesweeper
- Displacement: 120 long tons (122 t) standard; 164 long tons (167 t) full load
- Length: 100 ft (30 m) p/p; 106 ft 6 in (32.46 m) o/a
- Beam: 21 ft 4 in (6.50 m)
- Draught: 5 ft 6 in (1.68 m)
- Propulsion: 2 shaft Paxman 12YHAXM diesels; 1,100 bhp (820 kW)
- Speed: 14 knots (16 mph; 26 km/h)
- Complement: 2 officers, 13 ratings
- Armament: 1 × Bofors 40 mm L/60 gun or Oerlikon 20 mm cannon
- Notes: Pennant number(s): M2615 / IMS15

HMS Cardinham was one of 93 ships of the Ham-class of inshore minesweepers. Her name is commonly misspelled as Cardingham, but she was named after the village of Cardinham in Cornwall. Her cap tally and lifebelts displayed the name Cardinham.

Their names were all chosen from villages ending in -ham. The minesweeper was named after Cardinham.

== Career ==
Cardinham was one of the flotilla sent to Malta for the Suez campaign. Crossing the English Channel took several attempts until the weather eased. An earlier crossing by small ships led to some having the front of their chartrooms stove in, flooding the forepart and unfortunate descents.

Malta was reached without incident. However, when the Commodore chose Cardinham to evaluate the capability of streaming sweeps in moderately rough conditions, it was decided that the sweepers were too small actually to go to Suez, which was much regretted. They were intended to clear the canal before heavy ships cleared the area.

Anticipation was aroused when boxes containing 'anti-tank weapons' arrived. Investigation revealed them to be bren guns.

The cancellation was disappointing and the aggression build-up was relieved when a visit was made to Messina. Return was to Gareloch and paying-off.

Cardinham, and a sister ship Etchingham, were in service with the Hong Kong Royal Naval Reserve in the 1960s, until the unit was disbanded on 31 March 1967. Reservists were trained in minesweeping techniques using both sweeps and the electromagnetic loop.
