= HMS Cornflower (1916) =

Minesweeper of the Royal Navy

History

United Kingdom
- Name: HMS Cornflower
- Builder: Barclay Curle and Company, Whiteinch
- Yard number: 537
- Laid down: 1915
- Launched: 30 March 1916
- Motto: Fortiter et recte (Boldly and rightly)
- Fate: Sold in 1940

General characteristics
- Class & type: Arabis-class sloop
- Displacement: 1,200 long tons (1,200 t)
- Length: 255 ft 3 in (77.80 m) p.p.; 267 ft 9 in (81.61 m) o/a
- Beam: 33 ft 6 in (10.21 m)
- Draught: 11 ft 9 in (3.58 m)
- Propulsion: 1 × 4-cylinder triple expansion steam engine; 2 × cylindrical boilers; 1 × screw
- Speed: 17 knots (31 km/h; 20 mph)
- Range: 2,000 nmi (3,700 km; 2,300 mi) at 15 kn (28 km/h; 17 mph) with max. 260 tons of coal
- Armament: 2 × BL 4-inch Mk IX naval gun; 4 × QF 3-pounder Hotchkiss guns; 2 × Maxim .303 guns
- Armour: 0.25 in (6.4 mm) steel

HMS Cornflower (Chinese: 禾花) was an Arabis-class sloop of the Royal Navy and from 1933 the Hong Kong Naval Volunteer Force (HKNVR).

== Design and construction ==
The Arabis class was a slightly enlarged and improved derivative of the previous Acacia-class and Azalea-class sloops. (Note: Together with the following Aubrietia class and Anchusa class, these classes were collectively known as the Flower-class sloops.) They were designed at the start of the First World War as relatively fast minesweepers that could also carry out various miscellaneous duties in support of the fleet such as acting as dispatch vessels or carrying out towing operations, but as the war continued and the threat from German submarines grew, became increasingly involved in anti-submarine duties.

Cornflower was 268 ft (81.69 m) long overall and 255 ft (77.72 m) between perpendiculars, with a beam of 33 ft 6 in (10.21 m) and a draught of 11 ft (3.35 m). Displacement was 1,200 long tons (1,200 t) normal. Two cylindrical boilers fed steam to a four-cylinder triple expansion steam engine rated at 2,000 ihp (1,500 kW), giving a speed of 16 knots (30 km/h; 18 mph). The Arabis class had a main armament of two 4.7-inch (120 mm) guns or two 4-inch (102 mm) guns, with two 3-pounder (47 mm) anti-aircraft guns also carried.

Cornflower was one of a group of 21 Arabis-class sloops ordered on 15 July 1915. The ship was built by the Scottish shipbuilder Barclay, Curle and Company at their Whiteinch, Glasgow shipyard as yard number 537, was launched on 30 March 1916, and completed on 4 May that year.

== Service ==
On commissioning, Cornflower joined the 1st Sloop Flotilla, as part of the Coast of Ireland Station, but by September 1916 was lasted as part of the East Indies and Egypt Station. In September 1917, she transferred to the East Indies Station, and in January 1918 had transferred to the Egyptian Division of the Mediterranean Fleet. Cornflower was still part of the Egyptian Division at the end of the war, and was a member of the 13th Sloop Flotilla.

Between 1919 and 1921, she was then transferred to the Dardanelles and the Black Sea, once again performing minesweeping duties. From 1921 to 1927, she was in the Red Sea, with duties including operations against slave traders.

In 1927, she relieved HMS Hollyhock in Hong Kong. On 31 March 1934, the Royal Navy presented the ship to the HKNVR on permanent loan as a drill ship. Hong Kong Commodore-in-Charge Frank Elliot replaced the crest and motto of the ship to that of Clan Eliott (Elliot's ancestor Charles Elliot had also been the first Administrator of Hong Kong). In April 1934, she was put under the command of Lieutenant-Commander H. S. Rouse. She remained stationery at Wan Chai where she served as the headquarters and training ship of the HKNVR.

The upkeep of the aging vessel became a significant financial burden for the volunteer navy. Under Article XIX of the Washington Naval Treaty, no new naval bases should be established in the Pacific, and Cornflower should "not be allowed to degenerate to a hulk so that she can be considered part of the fixed defence of Hong Kong." By 1940, the ship was decrepit. A river steamer, SS Tai Hing, began to receive refitting in March 1940 to replace Cornflower as the headquarters of the HKNVR. The refitting was completed and the ship was formally handed over to the HKNVR in September. Tai Hing was renamed Cornflower after her predecessor to strengthen the unit's identify and esprit de corps. Cornflower was handed back to the Royal Navy to be broken up.
