= HMS Etchingham =

Minesweeper of the Royal Navy

History

United Kingdom
- Name: HMS Etchingham
- Namesake: Etchingham
- Builder: Ailsa Shipbuilding Company
- Launched: 9 December 1957
- Completed: 27 June 1958
- Fate: Sold for breaking in 1967

General characteristics
- Class & type: Ham class minesweeper
- Type: Minesweeper
- Displacement: 120 long tons (122 t) standard; 164 long tons (167 t) full load
- Length: 100 ft (30 m) p/p; 106 ft 6 in (32.46 m) o/a
- Beam: 21 ft 4 in (6.50 m)
- Draught: 5 ft 6 in (1.68 m)
- Propulsion: 2 shaft Paxman 12YHAXM diesels; 1,100 bhp (820 kW)
- Speed: 14 knots (16 mph; 26 km/h)
- Complement: 2 officers, 13 ratings
- Armament: 1 × Bofors 40 mm L/60 gun or Oerlikon 20 mm cannon
- Notes: Pennant number(s): M2625 / IMS27

HMS Etchingham was one of 93 ships of the Ham-class of inshore minesweepers.

Their names were all chosen from villages ending in -ham. The minesweeper was named after Etchingham in East Sussex. In the 1960s Etchingham and her sister ship, Cardinham were in service with the Hong Kong Royal Naval Reserve, until the unit was disbanded on 31 March 1967.
