= HMS St Sampson (W26) =

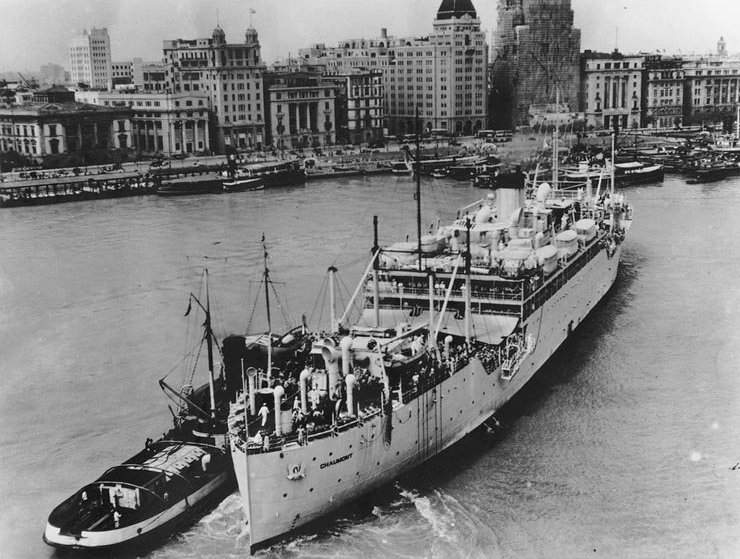
- The tug to the left of USS Chaumont is either St Sampson or her sister ship St Dominic, Shanghai, 1937

History

United Kingdom
- Name: HMS St Sampson
- Ordered: 18 April 1918
- Builder: Hong Kong and Whampoa Dock
- Launched: 1919
- Acquired: January 1920
- Fate: Foundered 7 March 1942

General characteristics
- Class & type: Saint-class tug
- Tonnage: 451 gross register tons (GRT)
- Displacement: 820 long tons (830 t)
- Length: 135 ft (41 m)
- Beam: 29 ft (8.8 m)
- Draught: 12 ft (3.7 m)
- Installed power: 1,250 ihp (930 kW)
- Propulsion: 1 × Triple expansion steam engine
- Speed: 11 knots (20 km/h; 13 mph)
- Complement: 37
- Armament: 1 × 12-pounder gun; 2 × Lewis gun

HMS St Sampson was a Saint-class tug launched in 1919.

The ship was ordered during World War I and was built by Hong Kong and Whampoa Dock. St Sampson was a tug boat specializing in rescue operations in hazardous waters. She was delivered to the Hong Kong Naval Yard in January 1920, after the war had ended. As a result, she was not put in commission and was offered on sale in 1921. She was at first sold to Wheelock and Company, but they defaulted on payment, and she was later sold to another company. By 1941, she was made part of the Hong Kong Royal Naval Volunteer Reserve, and was present during the Battle of Hong Kong.

She survived the battle, and in March 1942 participated in the rescue operations of MV Georgic in the Red Sea. She was damaged in the process and on 7 March, she foundered, and her crew was picked up by the hospital ship Dorsetshire.
