= Cornflower Wraith =

Demon in Slavic mythology

Habernitsa is a noon demon in Slavic mythology, said to live in the area of Prudnik. She is referred to as Chabernica in Polish and Хаберница (Habernitsa) in Russian. She can be referred to in English as "Cornflower Wraith", "Lady Cornflower" or "Cornflower Witch". Similar to Lady Midday.

She was usually pictured as a young slim woman dressed in azure with cornflowers in her hair, that roamed field bounds during midday. She was angered by people who trampled the grain or used sharp tools. Those she thought deserved punishment were put to sleep with her whisper, after which she caused them headache, paralysis or low back pain. Sometimes she attacked her victims by breaking their arms, legs or neck.

To avoid the wrath of the Cornflower Wraith, a worker had to take a break from work during the midday of Angelus.
