= Gul Makai (disambiguation) =

Gul Makai (lit. 'cornflower') may refer to:

- Gul Makai, the blog of Malala Yousafzai, using a name taken from a character in a Pashtun folktale
- Gul Makai, a 2020 Indian biographical drama film about Malala Yousafzai
