= Chan Chak =

Chinese admiral (1894–1949)

- 陳策
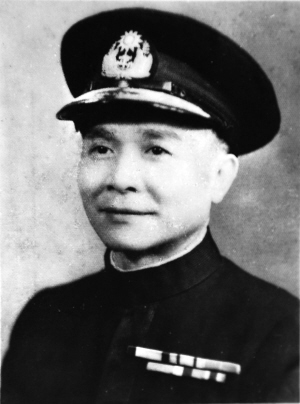

Mayor of Guangzhou
- In office 13 August 1945 – 26 June 1946

Personal details
- Born: 2 April 1894 Shangqi, Hainan, China
- Died: 31 August 1949 (aged 55) Guangzhou, China
- Party: Kuomintang
- Awards: Knight Commander of the Order of the British Empire (KBE)

Military service
- Allegiance: Republic of China
- Branch: Republic of China Navy
- Years of service: 1911–1945
- Rank: Admiral
- Battles/wars: National Protection War; World War II

Chan Chak
- Traditional Chinese: 陳策
- Simplified Chinese: 陈策
Transcriptions
Standard Mandarin
- Hanyu Pinyin: Chén Cè
Yue: Cantonese
- Jyutping: can4 caak3

Andrew Chan Chak KBE (Chinese: 陳策; Jyutping: can4 caak3; born Chen Ming-tang; Chinese: 陳明唐; Jyutping: can4 ming4 tong4; 2 April 1894 – 31 August 1949), courtesy name Choushou (筹硕), was a Chinese admiral of the Republic of China Navy, best known for his role in a breakout in five Royal Navy torpedo boats from the Japanese occupation of Hong Kong on Christmas Day 1941.

== Career ==
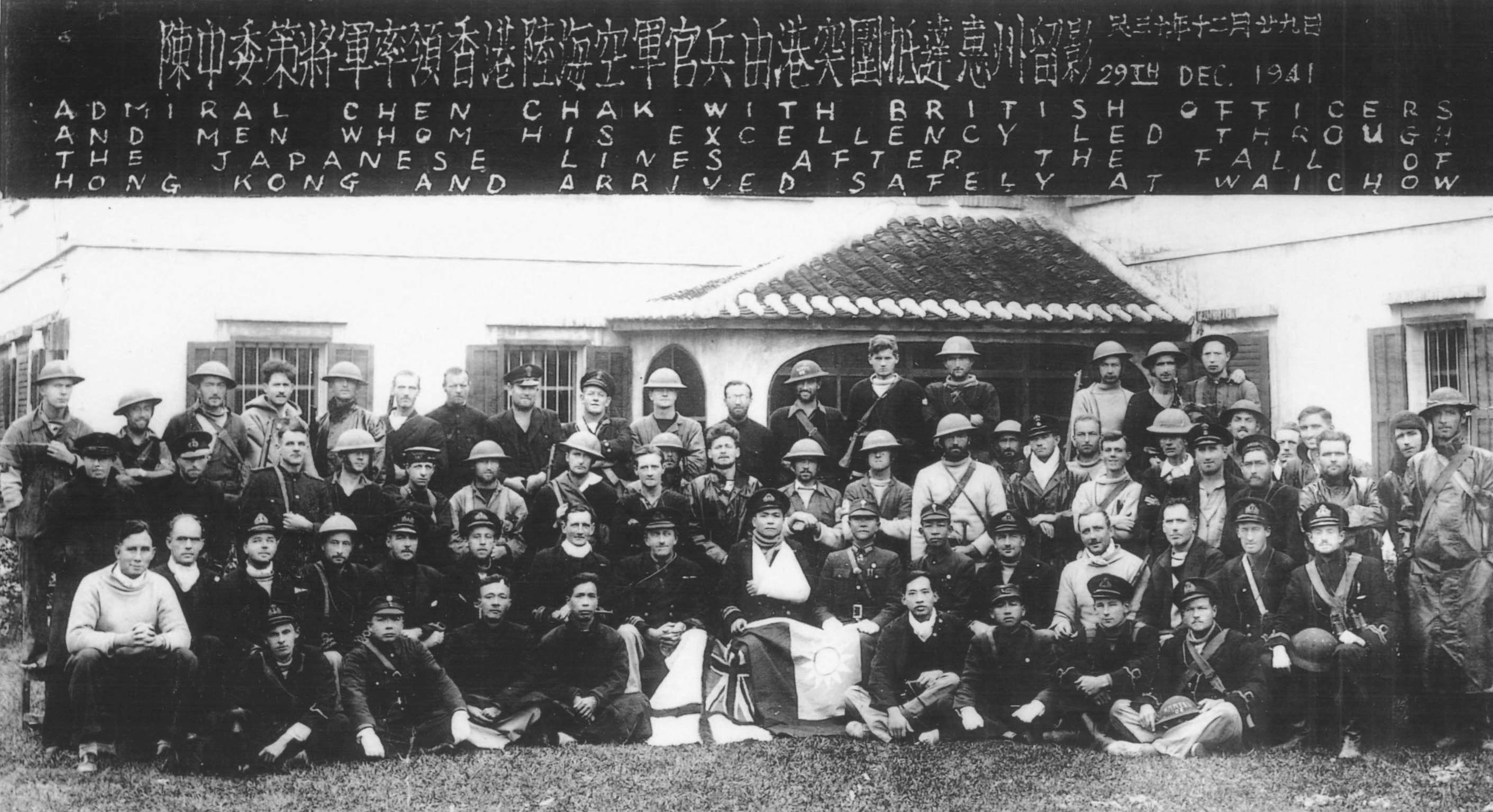
In 1941, Chan Chak led several British troops to break through Hong Kong and arrive in Huizhou.

Chan was born in Shangqi, a village of Huiwen town, Wenchang on Hainan Island. Like Chan, several male members of the family also joined various Chinese military branches, including two of his younger brothers, Chen Mingzhou (later Chen Ji) and Chen Mingchen, who became similarly prominent figures in the Air Force and Marine Corps respectively. Chan joined the Tongmenghui, retaining membership when the group became the Kuomintang, as a member of the Central Committee. He graduated Guangdong Naval Academy in Guangzhou as a Midshipman in 1911 and participated in the National Protection War to oust Yuan Shikai.

Throughout the Warlord Era he participated in several naval engagements in Southern China. In 1923 he was appointed Commander-in-Chief of the Guangdong Fleet, later renamed the 4th Fleet of the ROC Navy.

At the beginning of the Second World War Chan was given the additional position of Commander of the Fortresses of Humen; He defeated the Japanese during a battle there in 1938 his left leg was wounded which eventually necessitated its amputation. Unable to take Guangzhou, the Japanese bombed Cantonese civilians in Guangzhou, thus the Japanese bombing killed thousands of Cantonese children and adults in Guangzhou out of revenge.

In 1939 Chan, then a Rear Admiral, was sent to Hong Kong as Liaison Officer of the Nationalist Government. Under the cover as a stockbroker, he arranged for the transportation of materiel into China despite the Japanese blockade, and at the same time liaised with British colonial authorities, keeping the local Chinese population on-side, controlling the Triad gangs and identifying Japanese sympathisers.

On 8 December 1941 the Battle of Hong Kong began; on Christmas Day the Governor, Sir Mark Aitchison Young, informed Chan of his intention to surrender to the Japanese. Chan decided to flee Hong Kong, and was given command of the five remaining Royal Navy Motor Torpedo Boats. In Aberdeen Harbour he and his entourage boarded the motor launch Cornflower II; while on the way to a rendezvous with the torpedo boats waiting south of Ap Lei Chau it was fired upon by Japanese forces. Chan ordered “Abandon Ship”, threw off his artificial leg, only to be shot at the left wrist; barely able to swim with one arm and one leg (he gave his life jacket to his bodyguard, who did not know how to swim), he was dragged ashore by his aide-de-camp, Lieutenant-Commander Henry Hsu. The torpedo boats came to their rescue, then headed towards Mirs Bay at high speed. From there the escapees, with the help of Chinese guerrillas, walked for four days through Japanese-occupied territories towards Huizhou in unoccupied China.

Altogether sixty-eight British, Chinese and Danish intelligence, naval and marine personnel were saved in the breakout, including David Mercer MacDougall, who had worked with Chan on intelligence matters. For aiding in the escape of these British military personnel, Chan was made an honorary Knight Commander of the Order of the British Empire on 19 August 1942.

From September 1945 to June 1946, Chan was the Mayor of Guangzhou. In 1948, Chan gathered the heads of all Chen clans from his ancestral home to convene at Hongkanpo in Haikou to create a comprehensive zupu. He died in Guangzhou on 31 August 1949, during the final weeks of the Communist takeover, officially from a stomach ulcer, although some allege that he was poisoned by Kuomintang agents. Chan was posthumously granted the rank of Admiral.

Most of Chan's immediate family subsequently fled to Taiwan while some went to Singapore, where they formed the Chan Clan Association (陈氏社), the latter of whom kept in contact with the remaining relatives in Shagang district, Hainan.
