= Corps of Military Staff Clerks =

Administrative corps of the Canadian Army

- Active: Disbanded/Decommissioned/Inactive 30 Sep 1946
- Country: Canada
- Type: Corps
- Role: (Canadian Army) Permanent Active Militia
- March: "Old Comrades"

The Corps of Military Staff Clerks was an administrative corps of the Canadian Army. The Headquarters Corps of Military Staff Clerks was established in 1905.

The badge of the Corps of Military Staff Clerks consists of a circle, with a Kings Crown on top, superimposed on a pair of crossed quill pens, with the text "Corps of Military Staff Clerks" around the edge. At the center of the circle is a beaver.

The Corps of Military Staff Clerks was disbanded on 30 September 1946.

== See also ==
- Staff clerk
