= HMS St Aubin (W18) =

History

United Kingdom
- Name: HMS St Aubin
- Ordered: 18 April 1918
- Builder: Harland and Wolff, Govan
- Laid down: 1918
- Launched: 27 June 1918
- Commissioned: February 1940
- Decommissioned: 1943
- Renamed: Tsze-Hong (1947)
- Fate: Sunk on 9 November 1950

General characteristics
- Class & type: Saint-class tug
- Tonnage: 468 gross register tons (GRT)
- Displacement: 820 long tons (830 t)
- Length: 135 ft 5 in (41.28 m)]
- Beam: 29 ft 6 in (8.99 m)
- Draught: 13 ft 6 in (4.11 m)
- Installed power: 208 nhp; 1,200 ihp (890 kW)
- Propulsion: 1 × 3-cylinder triple expansion steam engine; 1 × screw
- Speed: 12 knots (22 km/h; 14 mph)
- Complement: 37
- Armament: 1 × 12-pounder gun; 2 × Lewis gun

HMS St Aubin was a Saint-class tug launched in 1918.

It was owned by the Admiralty until 12 April 1924, when it was sold to Shanghai Tug and Lighter Limited. On 8 March 1935, she was involved in a collision with SS Kiang Shun and was sunk in the Huangpu River. The sunken ship was not considered a significant threat to navigation, and was only raised more than six months later, on 25 September. On 4 July 1936, she was once again sunk in a collision with the naval cadet ship Ping An and SS Eugenia Chandris, and had to be raised.

In February 1940, the ship was requisitioned as a minesweeper and served under the Hong Kong Royal Naval Volunteer Reserve, where she was commanded by Lieutenant-Commander Peter Dulley. From 1943, the ship was laid up, until 1946 when she was returned to her owner. In November 1946, she was transferred to Yee Kee Tug & Lighter Co., and in 1947 she was renamed Tsze-Hong. In 1948, she was once again transferred to Chinese Maritime Trust Ltd. She was sunk off Taiwan on 9 November 1950.
