= Cornflour =

Cornflour or corn flour may refer to:

- Corn starch or cornflour (in the UK), from the endosperm of the kernel of the corn (maize) grain
- Maize flour or corn flour (in the US and elsewhere), very finely ground cornmeal, ground from dried maize

== See also ==
- Flour
- Starch
- Gluten
- Masa harina, a corn flour from the nixtamalization of maize
- Cornflower, a small annual flowering plant with blue flowers
