= SS Tai Hing =

River steamer

Tai Hing
United Kingdom
- Name: 1927–1940: SS Tai Hing; 1940–1941: HMS Cornflower; 1941–1944: SS Chuko Maru
- Builder: Kwong Tak Cheong
- Launched: 13 March 1927; 98 years ago
- Fate: Sunk on 20 August 1944

General characteristics
- Class & type: River steamer
- Tonnage: 1,068 GRT
- Length: 178.0 ft (54.3 m)
- Beam: 32.1 ft (9.8 m)
- Draught: 10.1 ft (3.1 m)
- Installed power: Single shaft engine; 96 nhp
- Propulsion: 2 x Screws

SS Tai Hing (Chinese: 大興) was a river steamer built in 1927. In 1940, she was given to the Hong Kong Royal Naval Volunteer Reserve (HKRNVR) and replaced HMS Cornflower as the headquarters of the unit. She was renamed HMS Cornflower (Chinese: 禾花) after its predecessor. To avoid confusion, the ship was sometimes referred to as HMS Cornflower II.

== History ==
She was built by Kwong Tak Cheong Shipbuilding Engineering and Dock Co. Ltd. (Chinese: 廣德昌船塢) of Hong Kong in 1927. She was operated by Kwong Wo S.S. Co. (Chinese: 廣榮輪船公司) departed on her maiden voyage for Wuzhou on 13 March 1927, and transferred to San Wo Co. Ltd. (Chinese: 生榮輪船公司) in around 1930. Tai Hing continued to ferry passengers between Hong Kong and China. By 1940, the ship was acquired by Sir Robert Ho Tung, and the ferry route was disrupted by the Second Sino-Japanese War.

=== Second World War ===
In March 1940, Tai Hing was turned over to the HKRNVR by Sir Ho Tung, where she would be loaned to for the duration of the war and three months thereafter. She began to receive refitting as a training ship in the same month. In June, she was used as a training ship by the unit. The ship was to replace the older training ship HMS Cornflower, used by HKRNVR as their headquarters.

In September, refitting was completed, and the ship was renamed HMS Cornflower after its predecessor. On 26 September, Cornflower was formally transferred to the Royal Naval Volunteer Reserve in a ceremony attended by Sir Ho Tung and acting governor Edward F. Norton.

During the Battle of Hong Kong in December 1941, the ship remained moored southwest of Kellett Island under the command of Lieutenant-Commander Richard J.D. Vernall. She was scuttled in Deep Water Bay on 19 December 1941. A launch from the ship was used to help survivors of the battle, led by Admiral Chan Chak, escape to China.

The ship was later refloated by Japan as a cargo ship and renamed SS Chuko Maru (中興丸). On 20 August 1944, she was bombed and sunk in the South China Sea off Hong Kong by Consolidated B-24 Liberator aircraft of the United States Fourteenth Air Force.
