= Hashidate-class gunboat =

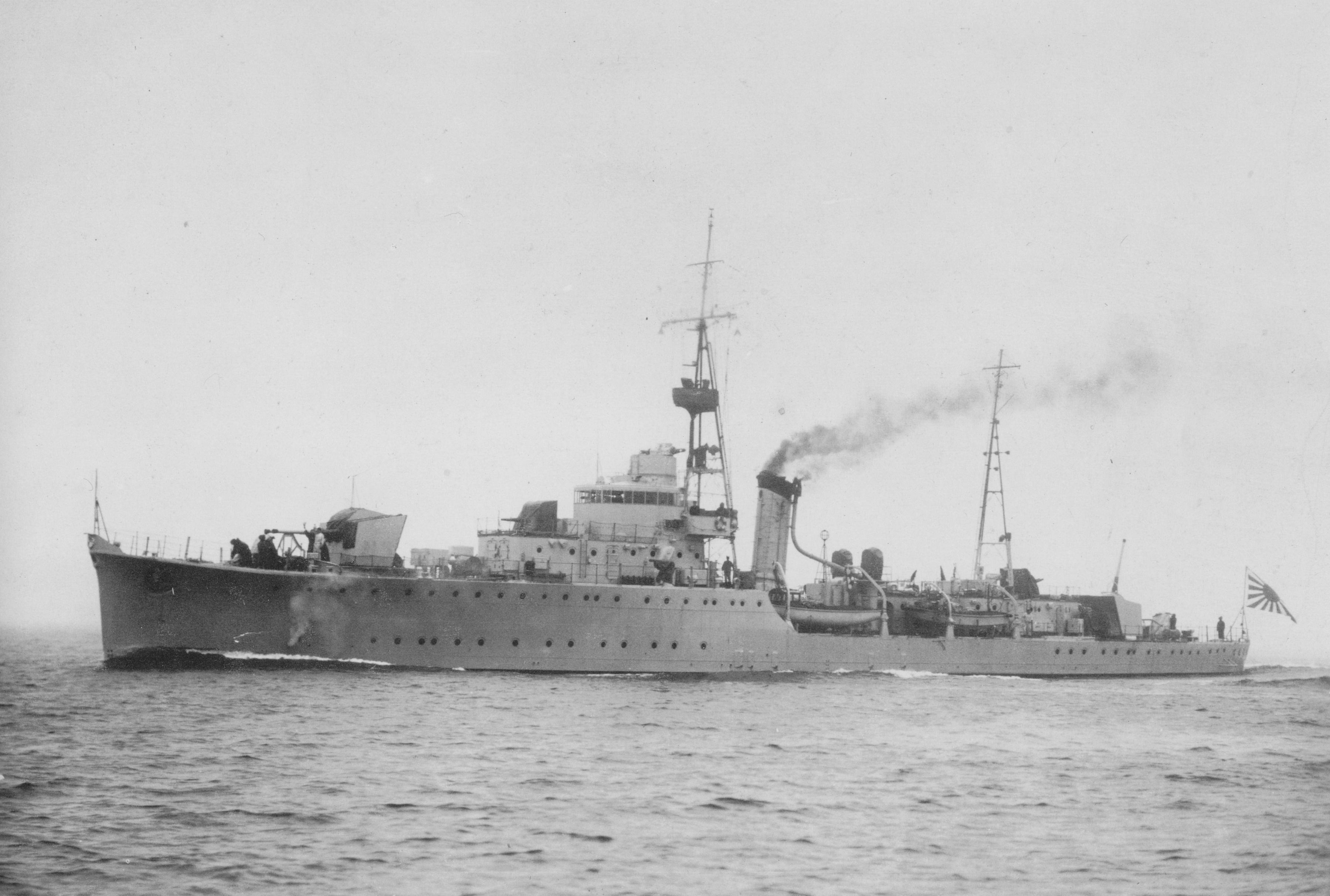
- Hashidate in Osaka Bay, June 1940

Class overview
- Name: Hashidate class
- Operators: Imperial Japanese Navy; Republic of China Navy; People's Liberation Army Navy
- Built: 1939-1941
- In commission: 1940-1980s(?)
- Completed: 2
- Lost: 1
- Scrapped: 1

General characteristics
- Type: Gunboat
- Displacement: 1000 tons standard, 1110 tons full load
- Length: 80.5 m (264 ft)
- Beam: 9.7 m (32 ft)
- Draught: 2.45 m (8 ft 0 in)
- Propulsion: geared turbines, 2 shafts, 4600 shp
- Speed: 19.5 knots (36.1 km/h; 22.4 mph)
- Range: 3,460 nmi (6,410 km; 3,980 mi) at 14 knots (26 km/h; 16 mph)
- Complement: 170
- Armament: 1 × twin, 1 × single 120 mm (4.7 in) gun; 2 × single 25 mm (1 in) AA guns

The Hashidate-class gunboat was a class of two Imperial Japanese Navy gunboats which served during World War II. The class consisted of two vessels, Hashidate and Uji. During World War II the number of their AA guns was increased and they were also equipped with depth charges.

== Construction and career ==
Uji was transferred to the Republic of China in 1947 and renamed Chang Chi. Two years later she was captured by the People's Republic of China during the Chinese Civil War and renamed Nan Chang. The ship was stricken from the People's Liberation Army Navy in 1986.

== Bibliography ==
- Dodson, Aidan & Cant, Serena (2020). Spoils of War: The Fate of Enemy Fleets after Two World Wars. Barnsley, UK: Seaforth Publishing. ISBN 978-1-5267-4198-1.
- Jentschura, Hansgeorg; Jung, Dieter; Mickel, Peter (1977). Warships of the Imperial Japanese Navy, 1869–1945. Annapolis, Maryland: United States Naval Institute. ISBN 0-87021-893-X.
- Sturton, Ian (1980). "Japan". In Chesneau, Roger (ed.). Conway's All the World's Fighting Ships 1922–1946. Greenwich, UK: Conway Maritime Press. ISBN 0-85177-146-7.
