= Japanese gunboat Hashidate =

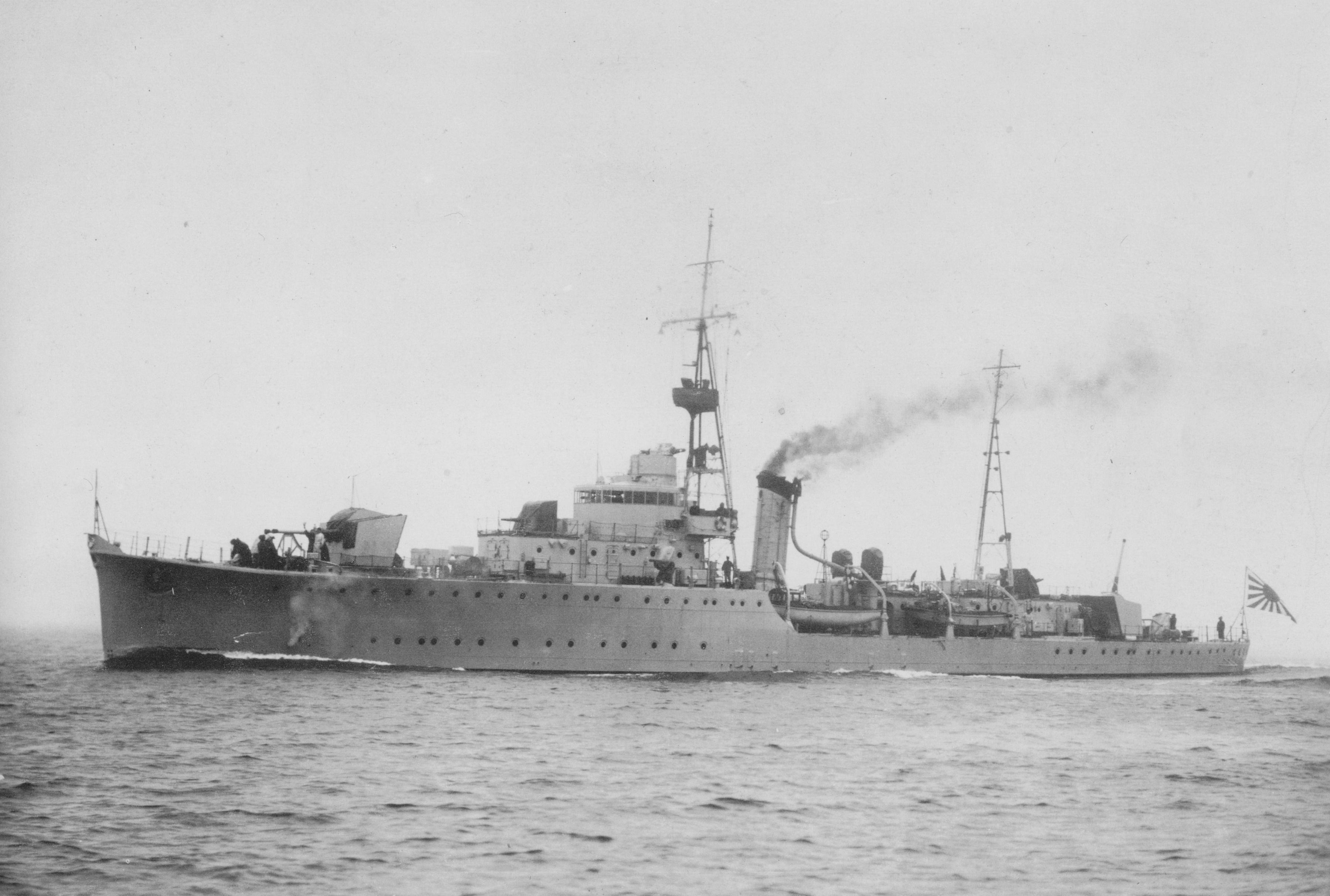
- Hashidate in Osaka Bay, June 1940

History

Japan
- Name: Hashidate
- Ordered: 1937
- Builder: Osaka Iron Works
- Laid down: February 20, 1939
- Launched: December 23, 1939
- Completed: June 30, 1940
- Stricken: July 10, 1944
- Fate: Sunk, May 22, 1944

General characteristics
- Class & type: Hashidate-class gunboat
- Displacement: 993 long tons (1,009 t)
- Length: 78.5 m (257 ft 7 in)
- Beam: 9.7 m (31 ft 10 in)
- Draught: 2.45 m (8 ft 0 in)
- Propulsion: >4,600 hp (3,400 kW) geared turbine
- Speed: 19.5 knots (36.1 km/h; 22.4 mph)
- Range: 2,500 nmi (4,600 km; 2,900 mi) at 14 knots (26 km/h; 16 mph)
- Complement: 158
- Armament: 3 × Type 3 120 mm 45 caliber naval gun (1 × 2, 1 × 1); 2 × Type 96 25 mm AT/AA Guns

Hashidate (橋立, Standing Bridge) was the lead vessel in the Hashidate-class gunboats in the Imperial Japanese Navy, that operated in China during the 1940s.

== History ==
Hashidate was authorized under the Maru-3 Naval Expansion Budget of 1937. She was laid down at Osaka Iron Works on February 20, 1939 and launched on December 23, 1939, and was commissioned into the Imperial Japanese Navy as on June 30, 1940. It was one of the Japanese vessels that took part in the battle of Hong Kong, which happened in 1941.

She was intended initially for support of combat operations by the Imperial Japanese Army in the Second Sino-Japanese War off the coast of China. At the time of the attack on Pearl Harbor, Hashidate was assigned to the China Area Fleet as part of the 2nd China Expeditionary Fleet's 15th Escort Group. With the start of the Pacific War, she was assigned to ”Operation C” – the invasion of Hong Kong. She remained based at Hong Kong for most of the war. At some point in 1943, five additional Type 96 25 mm AT/AA Guns were added, along with depth charges in 1944.

On May 22, 1944, she was torpedoed by USS Picuda in the South China Sea off Pratas Island while towing the crippled merchant passenger/cargo ship Tsukuba Maru at position 21°08′N 117°20′E.
