= Japanese gunboat Uji (1940) =

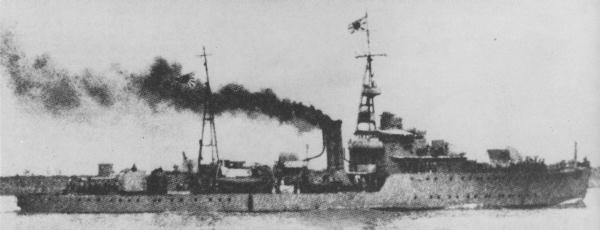
- Uji on the Yangtze River, 1941

History

Empire of Japan
- Name: Uji
- Ordered: 1937
- Builder: Osaka Iron Works
- Laid down: January 20, 1940
- Launched: September 29, 1940
- Completed: April 30, 1941
- Stricken: October 25, 1945
- Fate: Prize of war to China, September 13, 1945

Republic of China
- Name: Chang Zhi
- Acquired: 19 September 1945
- Stricken: 22 September 1949
- Fate: rebelled in Chinese Civil War

People's Republic of China
- Name: Chang Zhi
- Acquired: 19 September 1949
- Renamed: Nan Chang
- Fate: Scrapped in 1980s

General characteristics
- Type: Gunboat
- Displacement: 993 long tons (1,009 t)
- Length: 78.5 m (258 ft)
- Beam: 9.7 m (31 ft 10 in)
- Draught: 2.45 m (8 ft 0 in)
- Propulsion: 4,600 hp (3,400 kW) geared turbine
- Speed: 19.5 knots (36.1 km/h; 22.4 mph)
- Range: 2,500 nmi (4,600 km; 2,900 mi) at 14 knots (26 km/h; 16 mph)
- Complement: 158
- Armament: 3 × Type 3 120 mm 45 caliber naval gun (1 × 2, 1 × 1); 2 × Type 96 25 mm AT/AA Guns

Uji (宇治) was the second and final vessel in the Hashidate-class gunboats in the Imperial Japanese Navy, that operated in China during the 1940s.

== History ==
Uji was authorized under the Maru-3 Naval Expansion Budget of 1937. She was laid down at Osaka Iron Works on January 20, 1940, and launched on September 29, 1940. The ship was commissioned into the Imperial Japanese Navy on April 30, 1941. Uji was intended initially for support of combat operations by the Imperial Japanese Army in the Second Sino-Japanese War off the coast of China. At the time of the Attack on Pearl Harbor, Uji was assigned to the China Area Fleet as part of the 1st China Expeditionary Fleet's 11th Escort Group. At some point in 1943, five additional Type 96 25 mm AT/AA Guns were added, along with depth charges in 1944. She remained based in the Shanghai area, patrolling the lower reaches of the Yangtze River throughout most of World War II.

On April 21, 1944, she was assigned to the Take Convoy mission to transport the Imperial Japanese Army's IJA 32nd Division and IJA 35th Division from China via Takao, Keelung, and Manila to New Guinea. The convoy was attacked by the submarine USS Spearfish in the East China Sea and Uji was detached to escort the damaged fleet supply ship Mamiya to Moji, arriving on May 9. In August 1944, she departed Moji for convoy escort to Formosa and Okinawa, returning to Shanghai in January 1945.

After the surrender of Japan, she was transferred as a prize of war to the Republic of China Navy, and renamed Chang Chi (長治) on September 13, 1945, but was not formally removed from the Japanese navy list until October 25, 1945. On September 19, 1949, some sailors revolted and killed the captain, executive officer and others loyal to ROC, and turned her over to the People's Liberation Army Navy. On September 23 the Republic of China Air Force bombed and sank her. She was raised and rearmed in 1950 with Soviet supplied weaponry and renamed as Nan Chang (南昌).
