= Amfreville battery =

WWII German artillery battery in Normandy

- La Batterie d'Azeville
- Part of Atlantic Wall
- Querqueville, Normandy, France

Site information
- Code: Stützpunkt (Stp) 277
- Open to the public: No
- Condition: Private ownership

Location
- Coordinates: 49.6638°N 1.7078°W

Site history
- Built: 1943
- Built by: Organisation Todt
- In use: 1944
- Materials: Concrete and steel
- Battles/wars: Invasion of Normandy

Garrison information
- Garrison: 260th Marine Artillery Battalion
- Occupants: German

Amfreville battery (also known as York battery) was a World War II German artillery battery constructed close to the French village of Querqueville, 5 km (3.1 mi) west of Cherbourg Naval Base, in northwestern France. It formed part of Germany's Atlantic Wall coastal fortifications and protected the western entrance to the port of Cherbourg. The battery engaged British and US ships towards the end of June 1944 before the battery fell to advancing US forces on 26 June 1944.

== Construction ==
The battery had originally been a French artillery position dating from 1898 constructed to protect the port of Cherbourg. The French installed three canon de 164 mm Modèle 1893 artillery pieces in 1926. During the German advance into the Cotentin Peninsula on 18 June 1940 the French guns fired upon advancing German units in the Martinvast region. The guns were destroyed by the French before they could fall into German hands.

In 1943 the Germans used the site as part of their Atlantic Wall fortifications. Concrete casemates (based on the Regelbau M271 design) were constructed to house four First World War-era 17 cm SK L/40 guns which had a firing range of over 27 km (17 mi). A two-storey fire control tower was built to the rear of these bunkers. The battery was protected by a minefield, mortar pits and machine gun positions.

== Garrison ==
The battery was manned by elements of the 260th German Artillery Battalion.

== D-Day and Normandy landings ==
Cherbourg, with its deep-water port, had been designated as a strategic target by Allied planners during the preparations for the invasion of Normandy. Following the successful Allies landings in Normandy in early June 1944, American forces headed north through the Cotentin Peninsula towards Cherbourg. At the end of June 1944, the Amfreville battery fired upon Allied shipping approaching the port of Cherbourg.

On June 25, the battery engaged Allied ships which were supporting the liberation of the Cherbourg area. Allied warships including HMS Glasgow, HMS Enterprise and USS Texas shelled the battery but later withdrew out of range of the battery.

The following day, American ground troops attacked the battery and it surrendered to elements of the 2nd battalion of the 47th Infantry Regiment belonging to the 9th Infantry Division (United States).

Post war the battery was re-used by the French army. The battery and surrounding area was put up for sale in 2016.

== See also ==
- Azeville battery
- Crisbecq Battery
- Longues-sur-Mer battery
