= Hillman Fortress =

WW2 German bunker complex near Sword Beach, Normandy, France

- Part of Atlantic Wall
- Normandy, France
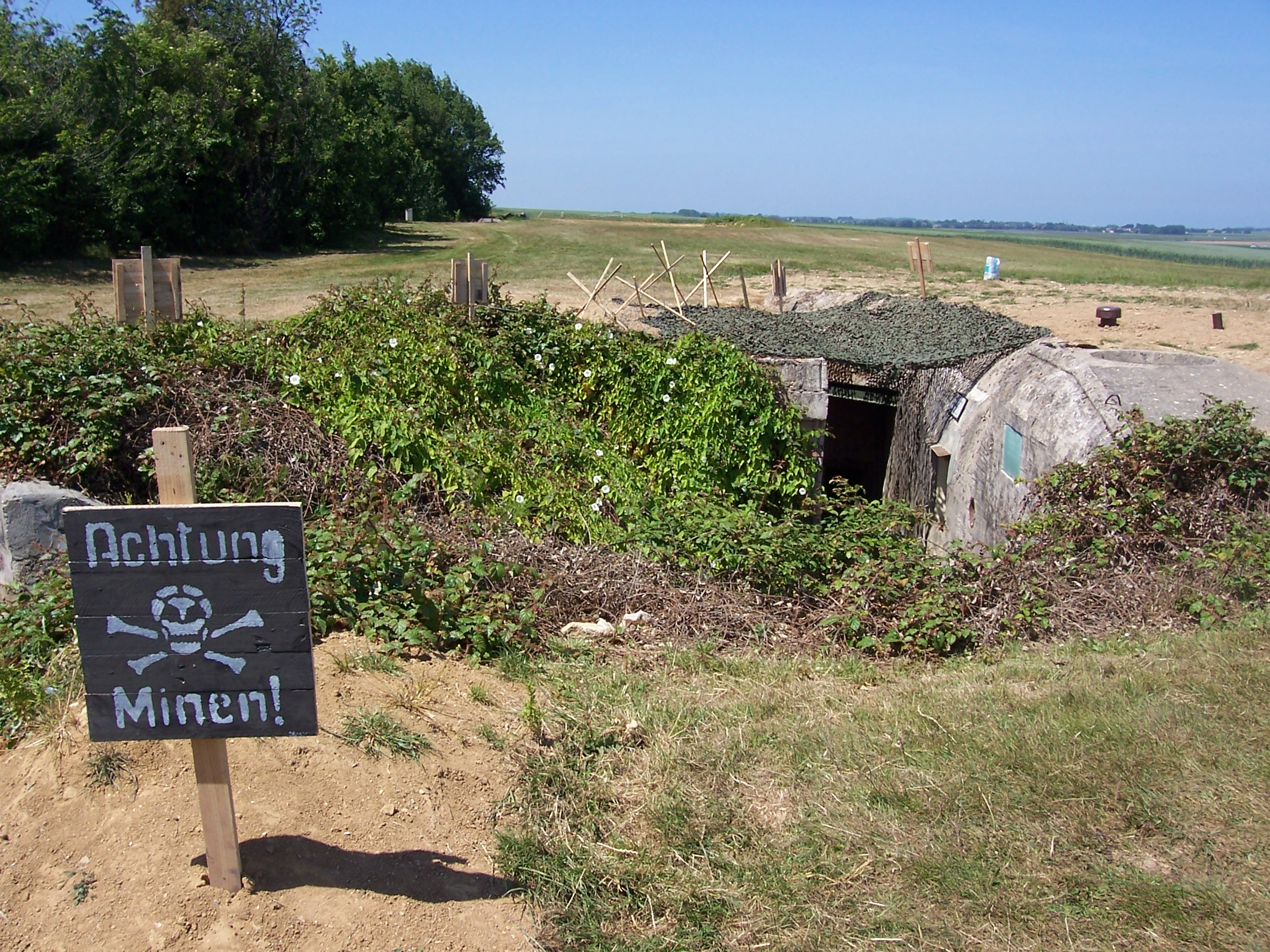
- Reconstitution on the Hillman site

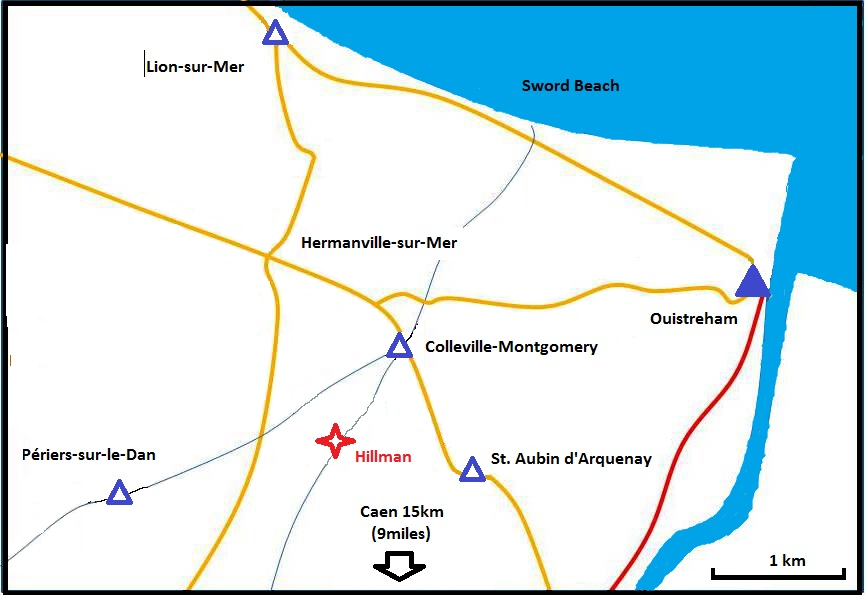
- Map of the location of the Hillman bunker complex in Normandy

Site information
- Type: Command post
- Owner: France
- Controlled by: Germany 1944, France 1944–present
- Open to the public: Yes
- Condition: Several casemates and trench system

Location
- Coordinates: 49°15′55″N 0°18′37″W

Site history
- Built: World War II
- Built by: Organisation Todt
- In use: 1943-1944
- Materials: Concrete, steel, barbed wire
- Battles/wars: Normandy landings

Garrison information
- Past commanders: Colonel Ludwig Krug
- Garrison: Wehrmacht
- Occupants: 736 Infantry Regiment

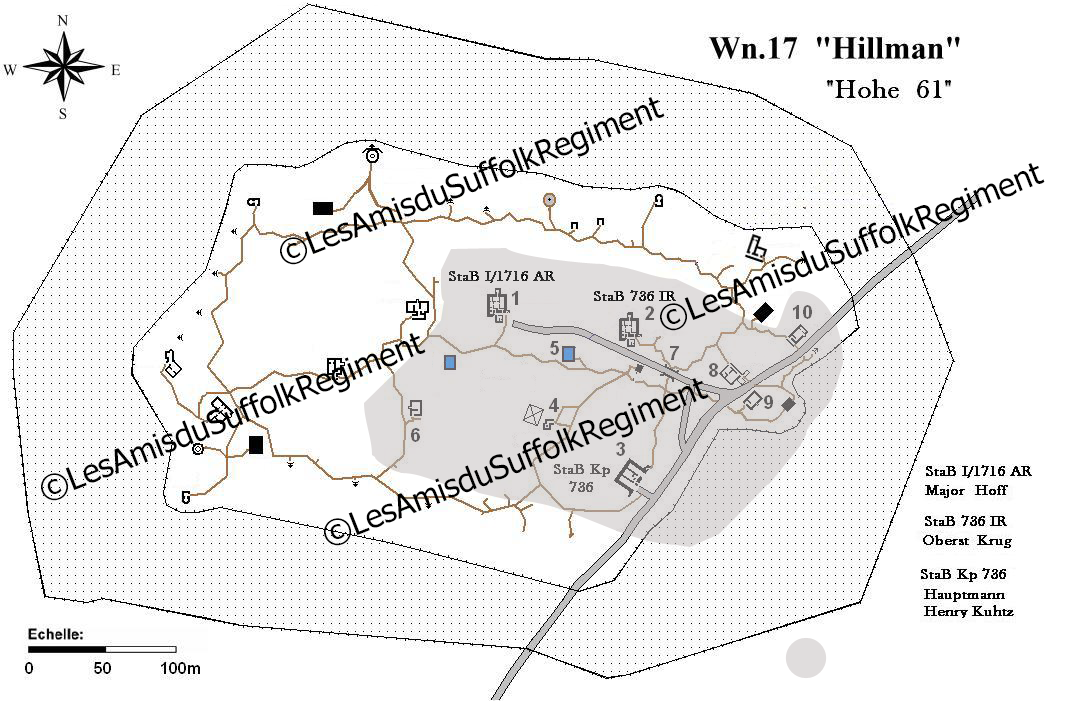
Legend 1 : Command post (artillery) 2 : Command post (infantry) 3 :Memorial of Suffolk Rgt 4 : Well 5 : Water tank 6 : Southern guard post 7 : Platform (tank crossing) 8 : Cookhouse 9 : Eastern guard post 10 : Northern guard post

The Hillman Fortress (French: Site fortifié Hillman, German: Widerstandsnest 17) was a German bunker complex and command post built during the Second World War and located near Colleville-Montgomery in Normandy, France. The bunker complex, designated as Hill 61 and codenamed Hillman by the British, was attacked on 6 June 1944 by the Suffolk Regiment and the fortress finally surrendered the following morning. The delay in taking the bunker complex has been cited as a reason for the Allies not completing their major D-Day objective of taking Caen.

The bunkers are now open as a museum and run by local volunteers.

== Construction ==
In 1942, towards the southern part of Colleville-Sur-Orne (renamed Colleville-Montgomery after the war), the Organisation Todt built a 24-hectare bunker complex consisting of 18 bunkers including two H608 command post bunkers (with armoured observation cupolas) and a H605 bunker for artillery guns. It was designated at Widerstandsnest 17 (resistance nest (strongpoint) WN17) by the Germans and served as headquarters of the 736th Grenadier Regiment. The complex was situated on high ground behind Ouistreham on the Périers Ridge, overlooking what was to become the D-Day landing beach Sword. As Hillman had no artillery it controlled the firing of the artillery at Widerstandsnest 16 (WN16), codenamed Morris by the Allies. The bunker complex was codenamed Hillman (other nearby bunkers were named Morris, Daimler and Humber after various makes of British car) by the British during the Normandy landings in June 1944.

== Garrison ==
Hillman was the regimental headquarters and command post for the coastal defence in the area and commanded by Colonel Ludwig Krug. The bunkers housed approximately 150 officers and men of 736 Grenadier Regiment (part of the 716th Static Infantry Division). A number of observation bunkers featured armoured cupolas with a thickness of approximately 20 in (51 cm) to 30 in (76 cm). The bunkers were well equipped, with mechanical ventilation systems, medical facilities, ammunition and food storage.

Between bunkers ran a network of trenches linking the different underground positions, consisting of the headquarters, signal centre, radio room, mess rooms and bathrooms. Every position was connected with each other through a network of telephone lines buried 2 m (6.6 ft) or 3 m (9.8 ft) underground. The entire complex was also surrounded by Tobruk pits (for machine guns), barbed wire and mine fields.

Built at 61 m (200 ft) above sea level, the complex offered direct views of the landing beaches, as well as the mouth of the Orne river. The field of fire or killing zone extended for approximately 600 m (2,000 ft).

== D-Day ==
On D-Day, 6 June 1944, the bunker were assaulted by the 1st Battalion, Suffolk Regiment, commanded by Lieutenant Colonel Richard E. Goodwin, part of the 8th Infantry Brigade of the British 3rd Infantry Division. The Suffolks had landed on Sword Beach at around 08:30 that morning and began heading inland to clear their objectives.

Supporting the Suffolks were tanks from A Squadron, Staffordshire Yeomanry and C Squadron of the 13th/18th Royal Hussars, two batteries from 33rd Field Regiment, Royal Artillery and 76th Field Regiment, Royal Artillery, Royal Engineers of the 246th Field Company and a machine-gun platoon from 2nd Battalion, Middlesex Regiment.

The Hillman bunkers were initially reconnoitred by Captain Geff Ryley, commanding officer of A Company. Ryley passes on information for British artillery, mortar crews and tanks to shell the bunkers. Attacking at approximately 1305, Hillman was initially outflanked to the north, where the Royal Engineers cleared mines and barbed wire using Bangalore torpedoes. Suffolks A Company passed through this clearance, led by Lieutenant Mike Russell. The company advanced into the German trenches but faced heavy machine gun fire (Captain Ryley being killed) and retreated.

The well-designed and defended bunkers proved difficult to take and the Suffolks brought Shermans from 13/18 Hussars and a second assault over-ran the site. To silence the bunkers Sherman Fireflies fired on the armoured cupolas but the rounds bounced off. The well-defended bunkers were proving an incredibly difficult task for the infantry, too. The combined armour and infantry succeeded in taking most of the complex by 2015 hours. The last remaining bunker surrendered on the early morning of 7 June by which time the Suffolks had lost two officers and five men killed and 24 wounded.

Historians suggest that the strong resistance of Hillman contributed to preventing the 3rd Infantry Division taking Caen as planned by the evening of 6 June.

== Gallery of bunker photographs ==
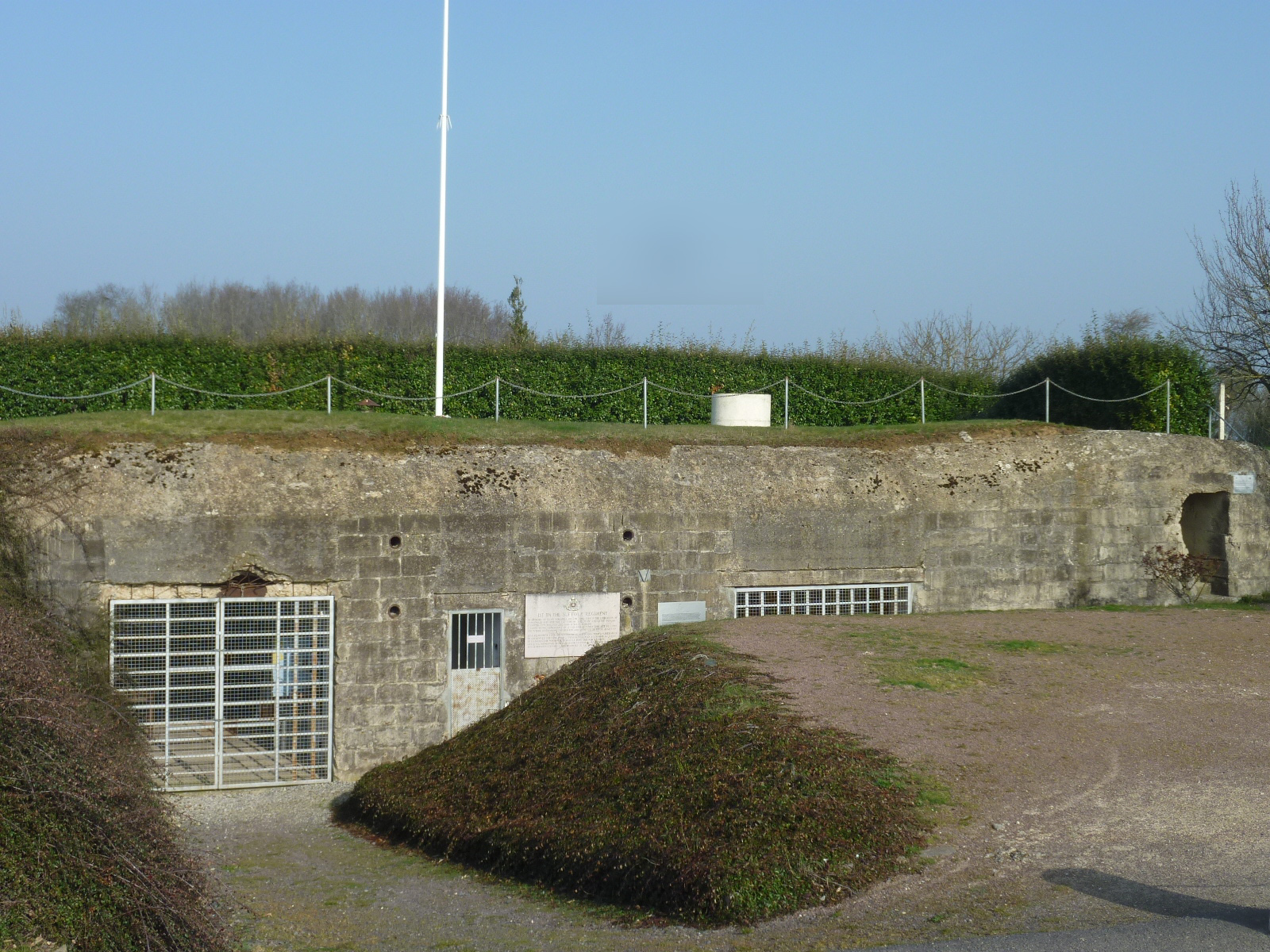
Bunker provided to the Suffolk Regiment in 1989 to act as their memorial and museum

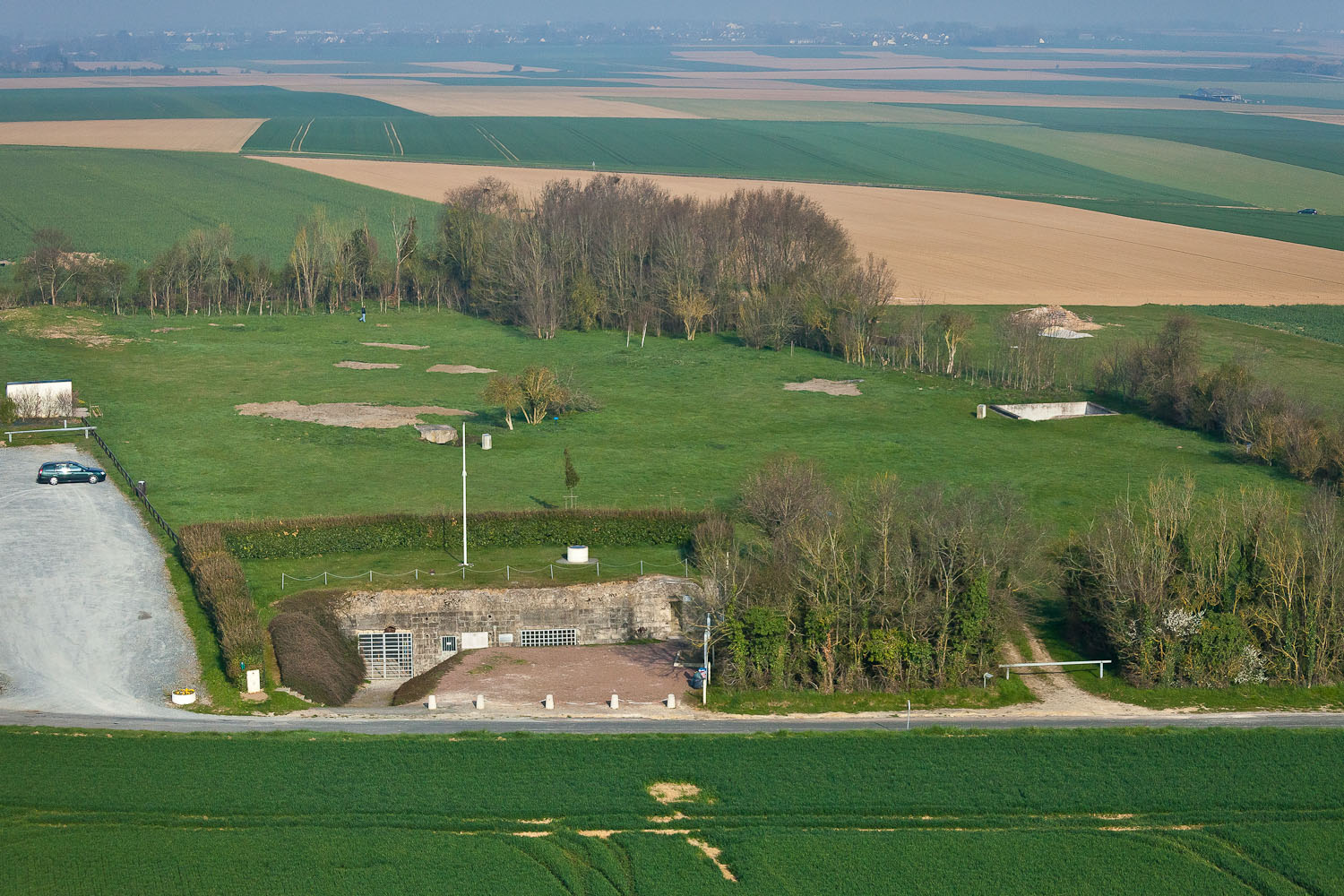
German Coastal Command Post (aerial view)

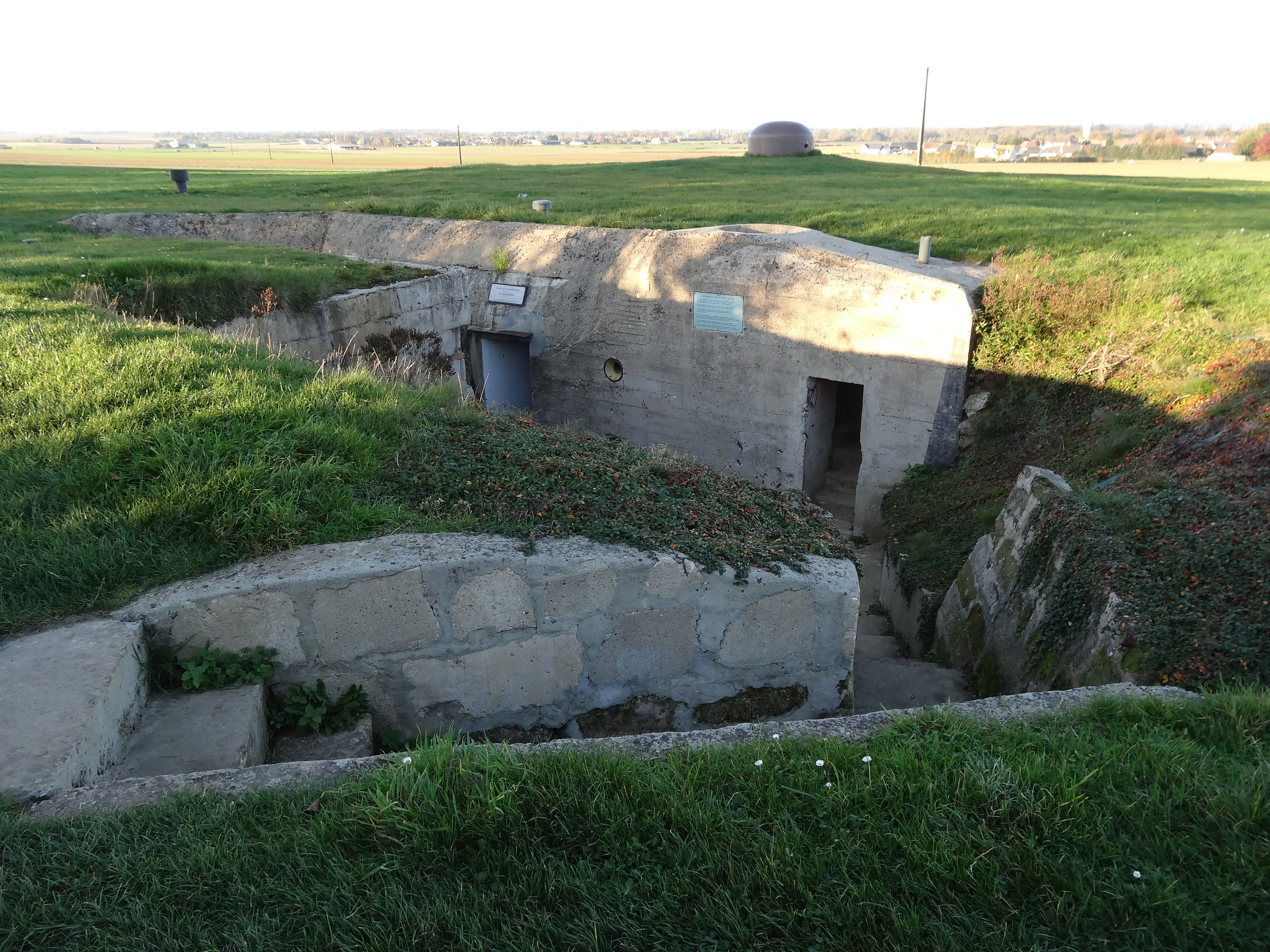
Colonel Krug's H608 command bunker at Hillman

== Postwar ==
Following the war the bunkers gradually filled with earth and rubble, preserving them in good condition. In 1989, Madame Lénaud, a resident of Colleville-Montgomery and the owner of the land where one of the bunkers was built, donated it to the Suffolk Regiment to commemorate what happened during the war. A memorial was created within the bunker, and inaugurated with the attendance of veterans of the Suffolk Regiment on 6 June 1989. Since 1990, the volunteers of the Association "Les Amis du Suffolk Regiment", and with the support of the local community, have preserved and continued to restore the Hillman Fortress, including Colonel Krug's command post.

== See also ==
- Longues-sur-Mer battery
- Crisbecq Battery
- Merville Gun Battery
- Maisy battery
