= Walter Ohmsen =

Knight's Cross recipient

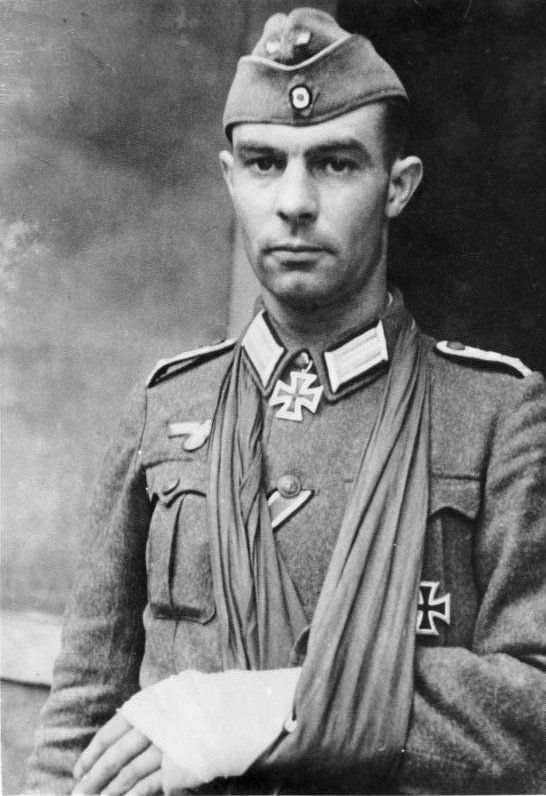
- Walter Ohmsen on 14 June 1944
- Born: 7 June 1911; Elmshorn
- Died: 19 February 1988 (aged 76); Kiel
- Military career
- Allegiance: Weimar Republic (to 1933); Nazi Germany (to 1945); West Germany
- Branch: Reichsmarine; Kriegsmarine; German Navy
- Service years: 1929–45; 1956–67
- Rank: Oberleutnant (M.A.) (Wehrmacht); Fregattenkapitän (Bundeswehr)
- Units: battleship Schleswig-Holstein; Gorch Fock cruiser Königsberg
- Commands: Crisbecq Battery
- Conflicts: World War II: Normandy landings; Battle of Cherbourg
- Awards: Knight's Cross of the Iron Cross; Federal Cross of Merit 2nd Class
- Other work: government employee

Walter Ohmsen (7 June 1911 – 19 February 1988) was a highly decorated Oberleutnant zur See in the Kriegsmarine during World War II. On 6 June 1944 the Western Allies launched Operation Overlord, the amphibious invasion of Normandy, France. Ohmsen was the first German defender of Fortress Europe to sight the invasion force. His battery engaged in heavy fighting and subsequently Ohmsen was awarded the Knight's Cross of the Iron Cross (Ritterkreuz des Eisernen Kreuzes) for the defense of the Crisbecq Battery against the American 4th Infantry Division, which landed on Utah Beach. The Knight's Cross of the Iron Cross, and its variants were the highest awards in the military and paramilitary forces of Nazi Germany during World War II.

== Military service ==
Walter Ohmsen was born on 7 June 1911, in Elmshorn and joined the military service of the Reichsmarine of the Weimar Republic on 1 April 1929 in Stralsund. (Note: The German Reichsmarine was renamed to Kriegsmarine on 1 June 1935.) He became a Matrosengefreiter (Seaman First Class) on 1 April 1933, and Bootsmannmaat (Petty Officer Third Class -Coxswain) on 1 September 1934. From 12 December 1934, until 1 January 1944, he was platoon commander, company commander then head of telemetry training at the Naval Artillery School in Sassnitz. He had been promoted to Oberbootsmannsmaat (Boatswain's Mate 2nd class) on 1 November 1935 and Bootsmann (Boatswain's Mate 1st class) on 1 September 1936. He served at sea on the German battleship Schleswig-Holstein, the training vessel Gorch Fock, the training ship Carl-Zeiss, the torpedo boat T-153 and the cruiser Königsberg. He attained the rank of Stabsoberbootsmann (Chief Boatswain's Mate) on 1 July 1940, and was awarded the War Merit Cross 2nd class with swords on 20 April 1941. During his assignment at the Coastal Artillery School he was promoted to Kriegsoffiziersanwärter (Officer Candidate) and became an officer attaining the rank of Leutnant der Marineartillerie (Ensign of Coastal Artillery) on 1 January 1942, and Oberleutnant (M.A.) (Lieutenant Junior Grade).

=== Normandy invasion ===
Ohmsen had taken command of the Crisbecq Battery 49°28.8′N 01°17.8′W, also known as Marine Küsten Batterie "Marcouf" (Naval Coastal Battery Marcouf) or Seeziel Batterie "Marcouf" (Sea Target Battery Marcouf), on 1 February 1944. His command, including himself, consisted of three officers, 24 non-commissioned officers and 287 men of the Kriegsmarine. The unit was subordinated to the Marine-Artillerie-Abteilung 260 (M.A.A. 260—260th Naval Coastal Artillery Battalion). The battery's personnel was further augmented by members of the 6./Grenadier-Regiment 919 (6th Company, 919th Grenadier Regiment) of the 709. Infanterie-Division (709th Infantry Division) for ground defense under the command of Leutnant Geissler, which brought the overall manpower of the battery close to 400 men.

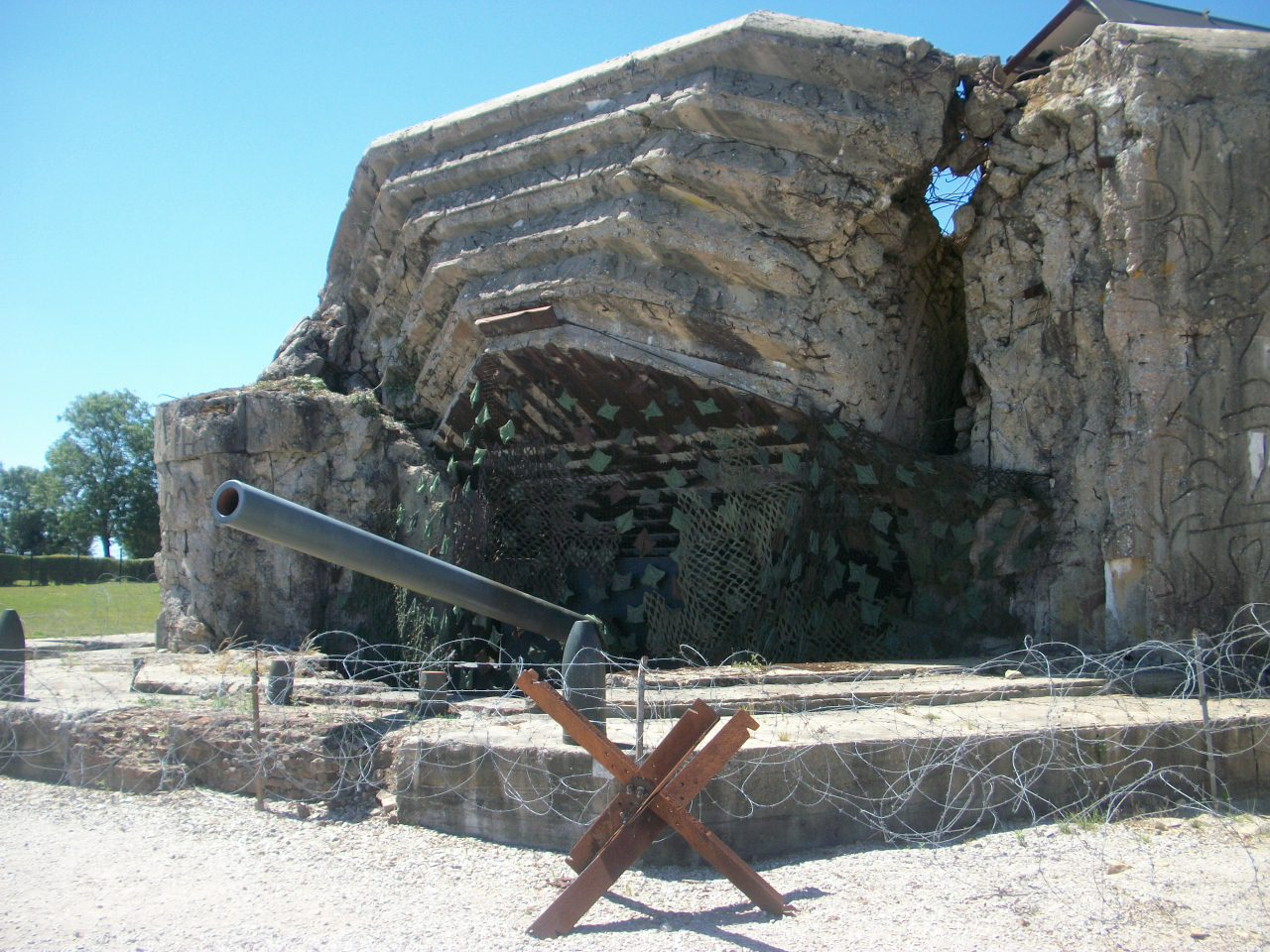
No. 19 Casemate of the Crisbecq Battery, 18 July 2010. (Note: At around noon on 21 August 1944 an enormous explosion of the ammunition of the 210mm shells and their powder charges stored in No. 19 casemate pushed the walls of the ammunition room outwards, causing the 1,200 metric ton ceiling to pitch backwards. About a dozen American soldiers were killed, two jeeps and one GMC truck were thrown on the other side of the road. Forensic evidence showed that the explosion was caused by a soldier who had entered the casemate with a cigarette.)

On 6 June 1944, at 5 a.m. Ohmsen was the first to sight the Allied invasion fleet through the battery rangefinder. He immediately reported his observation to the Kriegsmarine headquarters at Cherbourg, which triggered the German alarm throughout installations on the Atlantic coast. The notification of the award of his Knight's Cross of the Iron Cross (Ritterkreuz des Eisernen Kreuzes), announced in the German newspapers on 15 June 1944, also referred to Ohmsen as the first person to report the invasion fleet off Normandy. At 5:52 a.m. he received the order to open fire on the ships, which were then 17 kilometers (11 mi) away. At 5:55 a.m., Ohmsen's battery targeted and exchanged fire with the US cruisers USS Tuscaloosa and USS Quincy and the US battleship USS Nevada. At 6:30 a.m., the battery fired upon the US destroyer USS Corry and sank her.

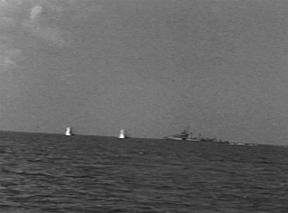
Near misses against USS Corry

At 8 a.m., Nevada hit the foremost casemated gun. The US battleships USS Texas and USS Arkansas, originally assigned to provide covering fire for the landing at Omaha Beach, intervened to help silence the Crisbecq Battery. At 9 a.m. the concentrated fire of the three battleships put the second casemate out of action, when a shell from Nevada pierced the embrasure, killing the entire crew. The remaining gun behind casemate No. 24, withstood the naval bombardment, but was incapable of reaching targets out at sea; the gun initiated fire at 11 a.m., directed to the beach facing WN 5 Widerstandsnest 5 (Resistance Nest 5), 10 kilometers (6.2 miles) away. It caused heavy losses among the Americans and hindered the landing of material and reinforcements at Utah Beach.

The American 1st Battalion, 22nd Infantry Regiment, 4th Infantry Division started their advance towards Saint-Marcouf and the Crisbecq Battery at 7 a.m. on 7 June. After the first assault they succeeded in entering Saint-Marcouf but were stopped in front of the battery by the 75 mm Flak guns that had been repaired and were put in firing positions against ground targets. A German counterattack on the flanks of the American forces, supported by the 105 mm K331 (f) guns from the Azeville battery 49°27.7′N 01°18.42′W forced Captain Tom Shields to withdraw. Concurrent to this ground fighting, the artillery duel between the Crisbecq Battery and the Allied fleet continued. One of the Škoda 210 mm gun K39/41 had been put back into service during the previous night. The gun was damaged once more and remained silent for the rest of the day. The Americans brought several field artillery guns in position during the afternoon and immediately started firing at the battery. Subsequently, the battery was subjected to harassing fire every night.

Ohmsen was awarded the Iron Cross 2nd Class (Eisernes Kreuz 2. Klasse) in the morning of 7 June 1944 for his defense of his strong point against the American attacks. On the evening of 7 June he received a phone call from Cherbourg with the information that he had been awarded the Iron Cross 1st Class (Eisernes Kreuz 1. Klasse) in addition to the earlier award. Ohmsen was wounded on the left hand during a bombardment of the battery in the afternoon of 8 June.

A direct hit from the Azeville Battery

The American 1st Battalion started their second attack on the battery at 10 a.m. on 8 June and retook the village of Saint-Marcouf. At 1:30 p.m. after the naval artillery had prepared the attack with a 20-minute bombardment and rolling artillery fire the attack on the battery continued. The Americans succeeded in entering the battery perimeter. The Germans had fallen back in the shelters but the last 210 mm gun was destroyed. At 4 p.m., American forces started to blow up the shelters; seeing that his forces had been overwhelmed, Ohmsen ordered the Azeville Battery to fire on his own position with its four 105 mm guns to chase them away. The effect was immediate and the Americans fell back in disarray. Ohmsen took advantage of the situation and counterattacked with the support of Leutnant Geissler's 6th company, and pushed the Americans back to Dodainville (roughly 1.2 kilometers (0.75 miles) south southeast of the battery). American casualties reached 15% of the forces they had committed to the attack and 98 soldiers were taken prisoner.

By the morning of 11 June, Ohmsen had run out of ammunition and medical equipment for the wounded and all his guns were out of service. In the afternoon, he received a phone call from Konteradmiral (Counter Admiral or Rear Admiral) Walter Hennecke, who instructed him to escape with the survivors. Leaving 21 wounded German soldiers and 126 American prisoners behind, Ohmsen and 78 men broke through the American encirclement and reached the German lines at Aumeville, roughly 8 kilometers (5 mi) away.

On 12 June, the soldiers of the 9th Infantry Division, who had come ashore the previous day, readied themselves for an attack on the battery. At 8:30 a.m., the men of the 2nd Battalion of the 39th Infantry Regiment started their attack but found only an empty battery. The fighting over the battery took a heavy toll on both sides, 307 German soldiers died to defend it and about as many Americans died to take it.

On 14 June, Ohmsen and his men reached the Morsalines battery, where he was decorated with the Knight's Cross of the Iron Cross. Ohmsen and his men were subsequently assigned to an infantry company and took part in the final days of the Battle of Cherbourg. Ohmsen was taken prisoner of war in Cherbourg on 26 June by the American forces. He was released on 15 March 1946.

== Later life ==
After World War II, Ohmsen initially worked as a government employee of the Schleswig-Holstein agricultural ministry. He ran for public office as a candidate of the Schleswig-Holstein-Block in the 1954 Landtag of Schleswig-Holstein election. During an election speech, he disparaged the Minister-President of Schleswig-Holstein Friedrich-Wilhelm Lübke. Ohmsen was immediately dismissed without notice from his position in the agricultural ministry for insulting the Minister-President. He rejoined the military service of the Bundeswehr on 16 March 1956, as a Kapitänleutnant (Captain Lieutenant) of the Bundesmarine (German Federal Navy). He was promoted to Korvettenkapitän (Corvette Captain) on 15 November 1957, and Fregattenkapitän (Frigate Captain) on 13 August 1965 and retired on 30 September 1967.

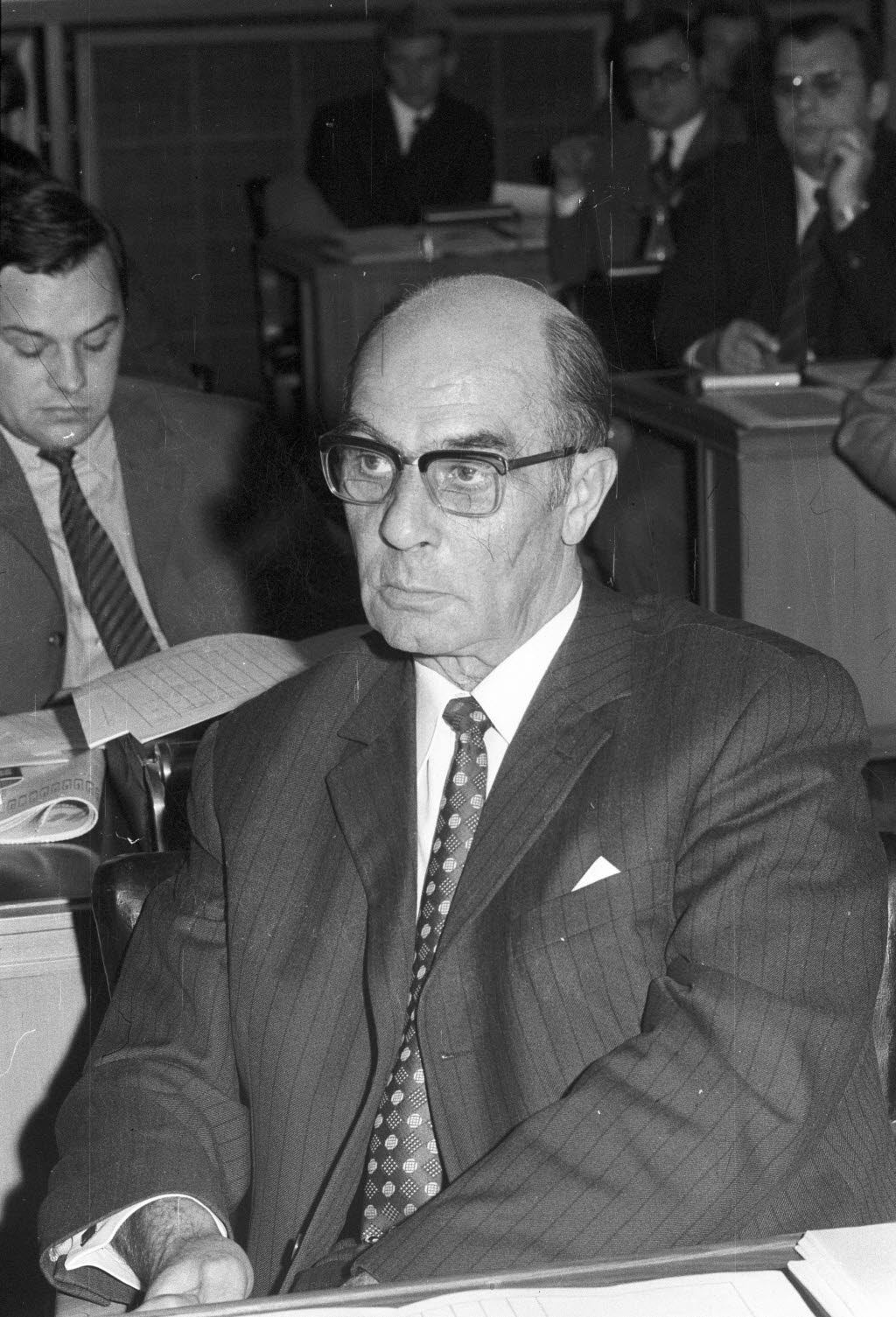
Ohmsen on 28 October 1971

From 1968 to 1978, Ohmsen was one of the organizers of the sailing at the Summer Olympics events and of numerous other larger sailing regattas and events. From 1970 to 1978, he also served as a member of the consultative council of the city of Kiel and was involved in the support of war victims. For these services he received the Freiherr-von-Stein commemorative medal and Federal Cross of Merit 2nd Class (Bundesverdienstkreuz 2. Klasse). The father of three daughters, Walter Ohmsen died in Kiel on 19 February 1988.

== Awards and decorations ==
- Iron Cross (1939)
  - 2nd Class (7 June 1944)
  - 1st Class (7 June 1944)
- War Merit Cross 2nd Class with Swords (20 April 1941)
- Knight's Cross of the Iron Cross on 14 June 1944 as Oberleutnant (M.A.) and chief of the Marinebatterie "Marcouf" (Marine-Artillerie-Abteilung 260) (Note: According to Scherzer as chief of the Seeziel-Batterie "Marcouf" (Marine-Artillerie-Abteilung 260).)
- Freiherr-von-Stein commemorative medal
- Federal Cross of Merit 2nd Class

== Promotions ==
Kriegsmarine
1 April 1933:	Matrosengefreiter (Seaman)
1 September 1934:	Bootsmannsmaat (Boatswain's Mate Third Class)
1 September 1936:	Oberbootsmannsmaat (Boatswain's Mate Second Class)
1 November 1936:	Bootsmann (Boatswain's Mate First Class)
1 July 1937:	Oberbootsmann (Chief Boatswain's Mate)
1 July 1940:	Stabsoberbootsmann (Senior Chief Boatswain's Mate)
29 September 1941:	Kriegsoffiziersanwärter (Officer Candidate)
1 January 1942:	Leutnant (M.A.) (Ensign)
1 July 1942:	Oberleutnant (M.A.) (Lieutenant Junior Grade)
Bundesmarine
17 March 1956:	Kapitänleutnant (Lieutenant)
15 November 1957:	Korvettenkapitän (Lieutenant Commander)
13 August 1965:	Fregattenkapitän (Commander)

== Notes ==
Military offices
Preceded by —	Commander of the Marinestützpunktkommando Flensburg-Mürwik; July 1956 – December 1956	Succeeded by Korvettenkapitän Gustav-Adolf Janssen
Preceded by —	Harbor Captain Kiel; January 1957 – March 1965	Succeeded by Korvettenkapitän Fritz Löhrl
