= USS Corry (DD-463) =

US Navy Gleaves-class destroyer

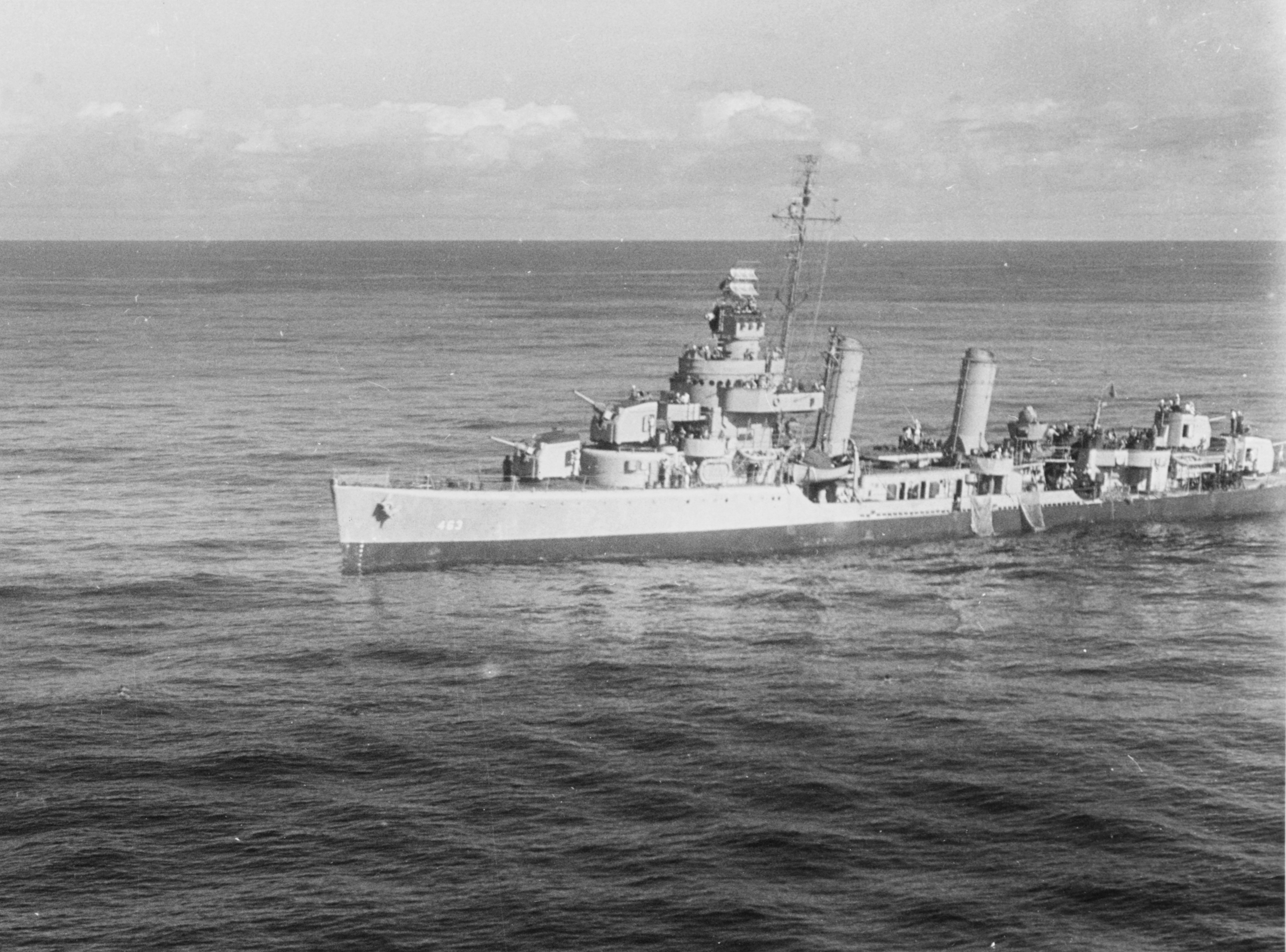
- USS Corry rescues survivors of U-801, 17 March 1944.

History

United States
- Name: Corry
- Namesake: William M. Corry, Jr.
- Builder: Charleston Navy Yard
- Laid down: 4 September 1940
- Launched: 28 July 1941
- Commissioned: 18 December 1941
- Fate: Sunk 6 June 1944

General characteristics
- Class & type: Gleaves-class destroyer
- Displacement: 1,630 tons
- Length: 348 ft 3 in (106.15 m)
- Beam: 36 ft 1 in (11.00 m)
- Draft: 11 ft 10 in (3.61 m)
- Propulsion: 50,000 shp (37,000 kW); 4 boilers; 2 propellers
- Speed: 37.4 knots (69 km/h)
- Range: 6,500 nmi (12,000 km; 7,500 mi) at 12 kn (22 km/h; 14 mph)
- Complement: 16 officers, 260 enlisted
- Armament: 4 × 5 in (127 mm) DP guns, 6 × 0.50 in (12.7 mm) guns, 6 × 20 mm AA guns, 10 × 21-inch (533 mm) torpedo tubes, 2 × depth charge tracks

USS Corry (DD-463), a Gleaves-class destroyer, (also known as the Bristol class), was the second ship of the United States Navy to be named for Lieutenant Commander William M. Corry, Jr., an officer in the Navy during World War I and a recipient of the Medal of Honor.

Corry was launched 28 July 1941 by Charleston Navy Yard, sponsored by Miss Jean Constance Corry. The ship was commissioned on 18 December 1941 and reported to the U.S. Atlantic Fleet.

== Service history ==
=== 1942–1944 ===
Corry conducted special operations with Radio Washington at Annapolis from 18 to 21 May 1942, then sailed to escort RMS Queen Elizabeth into New York Harbor 22 May. After an escort voyage to Bermuda, she patrolled off Newfoundland between 31 May and 23 June and rejoined her group at Newport on 1 July. She then operated on coastal patrol and escort, voyaging several times to Caribbean ports, until 19 October, when she put into Bermuda. During this period she picked up survivors of the torpedoed SS Ruth from a life raft off Trinidad.

Corry cleared Bermuda on 25 October 1942 for Casablanca to participate in the Moroccan landings, in the screen of the aircraft carrier Ranger. She left Casablanca 16 November for Norfolk and Boston. After overhaul, she resumed her coastal and Caribbean operations until 13 February 1943, when she sailed on escort duty from Norfolk for north Africa, returning 6 March for operations in the western Atlantic. On 11 August she sailed for Scotland and operated with the British Home Fleet, cruising once to Norway as providing escort for Ranger in the successful Allied air raid on Bodø, Norway in October 1943 (Operation Leader). Corry sailed twice to Iceland to cover the movement of Russia-bound convoys. Returning to Boston on 3 December, Corry sailed on 24 December for escort duty to New Orleans and Panama.

Similar operations continued until 16 February 1944, when Corry sailed for hunter-killer operations in the Atlantic with Task Group 21.16 (TG 21.16), arriving at Casablanca 8 March. She left Casablanca 11 March, and on 16 March joined with Bronstein in attacking U-801. Following Corry's depth charge attack mid-day on 17 March, when the submarine surfaced Corry sank her with gunfire, and picked up her 47 survivors. Two days later, on 19 March 1944, Corry rescued eight survivors of U-1059, which was sunk at 13°06′N 33°26′W, southwest of the Cape Verde Islands, by aircraft from Block Island. Among the U-1059 survivors was the commanding officer. Corry arrived at Boston on 30 March for overhaul followed by training.

=== Invasion of Normandy ===
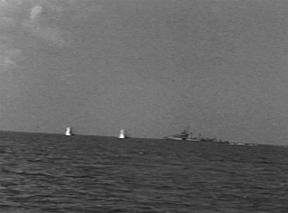
Two near misses from the shore batteries against USS Corry

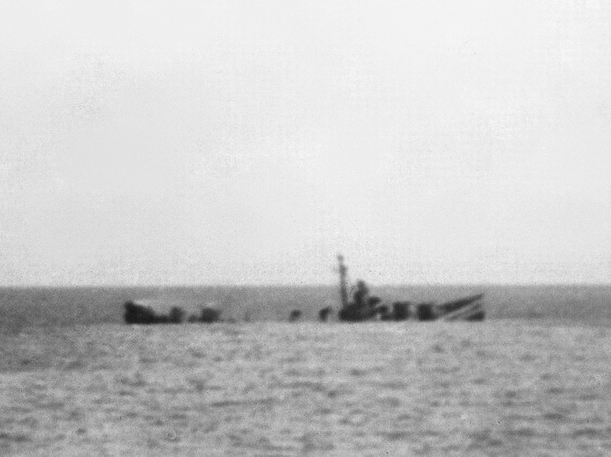
Corry sinking off Utah Beach, 6 June 1944

Corry cleared Norfolk on 20 April 1944 for Great Britain to participate in the staging of the Normandy invasion. Getting underway from Plymouth, England, she was the lead destroyer of the Normandy Invasion task force, escorting ships and transports across the English Channel. Upon arriving off the coast of Normandy, France, she headed for Îles Saint-Marcouf, her station for fire support on the front lines at Utah Beach in the Normandy invasion.

As H-Hour (06:30) neared, when troops would begin fighting their way onto the beaches, the plane assigned to lay smoke for Corry was shot down, leaving the ship exposed to German shore batteries. Maneuvering as close as 1,000 yards from the beach, Corry fired several hundred rounds of 5-inch ammunition at numerous onshore targets. At approximately H-Hour, during a duel with a shore battery, Corry suffered several hits from 210mm (8-inch) shells in her engineering spaces amidships. With her rudder jammed, she went around in a circle before all steam was lost. Still under heavy fire, Corry began sinking rapidly with her keel broken and a foot-wide crack across her main deck amidships. After the order to abandon ship, crewmembers fought to survive in bone-chilling 12 °C (54 °F) water for more than two hours as they awaited rescue under constant enemy fire from German shore gunners.

One crewmember raised the American flag up Corry's main mast, which remained above the surface of the shallow 30-foot-deep (9.1 m) water when the ship settled on the bottom at 49°30′50″N 1°11′30″W. Corry survivors were rescued by Fitch, Hobson, Butler, and PT-199. Of her crew, 24 were killed and 60 were wounded.

== Discrepancy over the sinking of Corry ==
About two weeks after D-Day, a detailed report stating that heavy artillery fire had sunk Corry was about to be submitted as the official loss of ship report, but it was suddenly scrapped and rewritten. This final official loss report for Corry stated on its last page that shelling received resulted in "merely incidental damage". The official loss of ship report for Corry states that at 06:33 she hit a mine, which was said to have exploded below her engineering spaces. No officers or crew were consulted for input on the rewrite of the report.

Initial reports by the commanding officer state that Corry was sunk by a salvo of heavy caliber projectiles, which detonated amidships below the water level in the engineering spaces and caused the breaking in half and sinking of the vessel. German reports also state that the Saint Marcouf (Crisbecq) battery commanded by Walter Ohmsen, located 1 1/2 miles (2.4 km) inland, with its three 210-millimeter (8.25 in) guns scored a direct hit on an American warship at approximately H-Hour (0630), causing its sinking. The warship was initially believed to be a light cruiser (due to Corry's silhouette resembling that of a light cruiser at a distance).

== Awards ==
Corry received four battle stars for World War II service.
