= Azeville =

- Commune
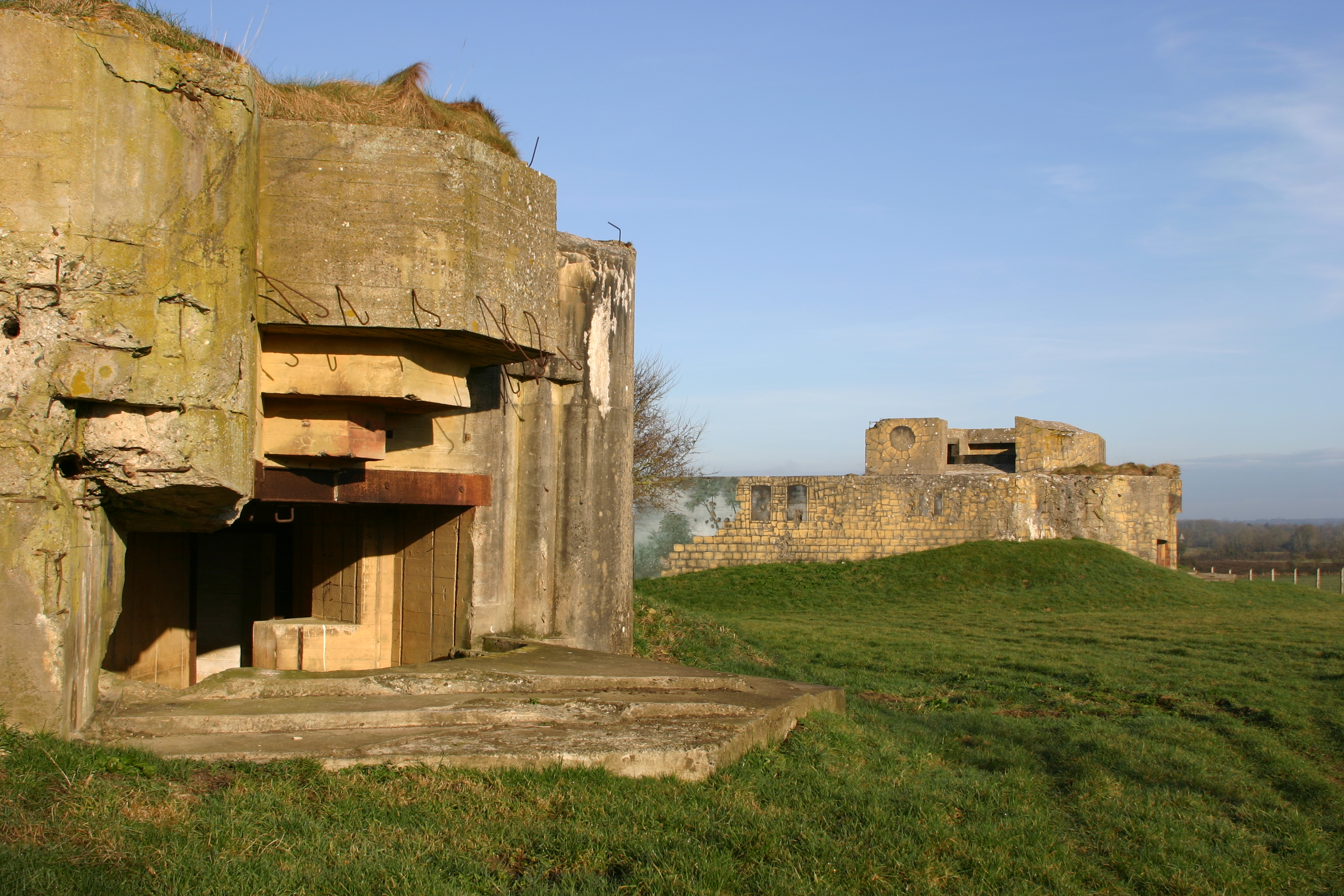
- Azeville bunker
- Location of Azeville
- Location within France Location within Normandy
- Coordinates: 49°27′33″N 1°18′48″W
- Country: France
- Region: Normandy
- Department: Manche
- Arrondissement: Cherbourg
- Canton: Valognes
- Intercommunality: Cotentin

Government
  - Mayor (2020–2026): Nicolas Poisson
- Area^{1}: 3.00 km^{2} (1.16 sq mi)
- Elevation: 20 m (66 ft)
- Highest elevation: 34 m (112 ft)
- Lowest elevation: 6 m (20 ft)
- Population (2023): 79
  - Density: 26/km^{2} (68/sq mi)
- Time zone: UTC+01:00 (CET)
  - Summer (DST): UTC+02:00 (CEST)
- INSEE/Postal code: 50026 /50310
- ^{1} French Land Register data, which excludes lakes, ponds, glaciers > 1 km^{2} (0.386 sq mi or 247 acres) and river estuaries.

Azeville is a commune in the Manche department in the Normandy region in northwestern France.

== World War II ==
Some of the first German fortifications built on the French coast were started at Azeville battery in 1941. The Germans installed four First World War 105 mm guns in concrete casements. The guns at the battery fired upon Utah Beach on D-Day (6 June 1944) and the battery fell into American hands on the morning of 9 June 1944. The battery is now a museum.

After the liberation of the area by Allied Forces in early June 1944, engineers of the Ninth Air Force IX Engineering Command began construction of a combat Advanced Landing Ground to the south of the town. Declared operational on 24 June, the airfield was designated as "A-7", it was initially used by the 365th Fighter Group which flew P-47 Thunderbolts until mid-August when the unit moved into Central France. Afterward, the airfield was used by the 363d Fighter Group with P-51 Mustangs until mid-September when it was closed.

== Population ==
Historical population
Year	Pop.	±% p.a.
1968	102	—
1975	109	+0.95%
1982	83	−3.82%
1990	73	−1.59%
1999	78	+0.74%
2007	78	+0.00%
2012	87	+2.21%
2017	85	−0.46%
2023	79	−1.21%
Source: INSEE

== See also ==
- Communes of the Manche department
