= Azeville Airfield =

Azeville/Fontenay Airfield Advanced Landing Ground (ALG) A-7
- Manche, Basse-Normandie Region, France
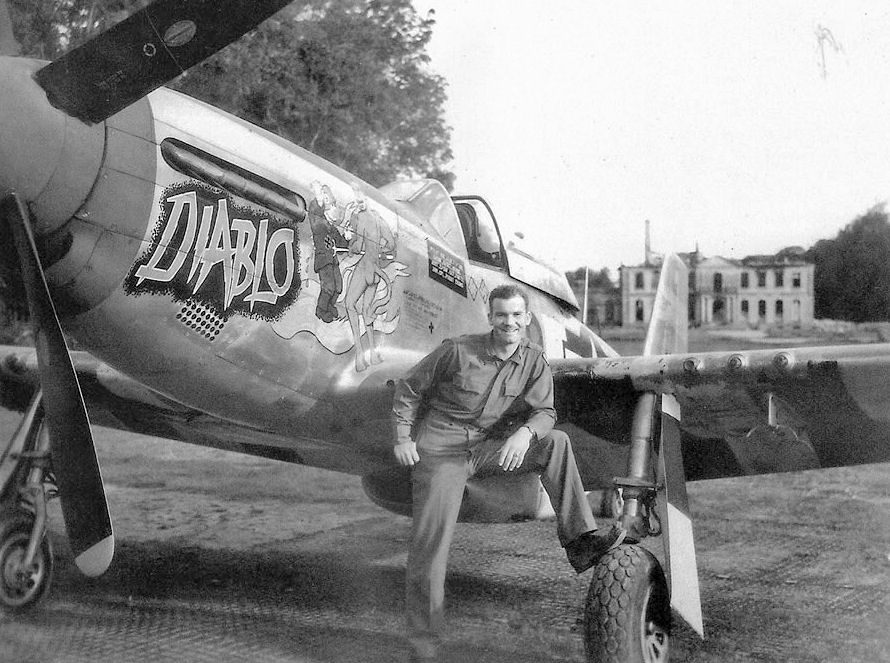
- Colonel James B. Tipton commanding the 363d Fighter Group standing by his P-51D "Diablo" at Azeville Airfield A-7, France

Site information
- Type: Military Airfield
- Controlled by: United States Army Air Forces

Location
- Coordinates: 49°28′55″N 001°18′55″W

Site history
- Built by: IX Engineering Command
- In use: June–September 1944
- Materials: Square-Mesh Track (SMT)
- Battles/wars: World War II – EAME Theater: Normandy Campaign; Northern France Campaign

Garrison information
- Garrison: Ninth Air Force
- Occupants: 365th Fighter Group; 363d Fighter Group; 363d Tactial Reconnaissance Group

Airfield information
Runways
Direction	Length and surface
08/26	3,600 feet (1,100 m) SMT/PSP
- One runway, 4 alert pads, 50 hardstands

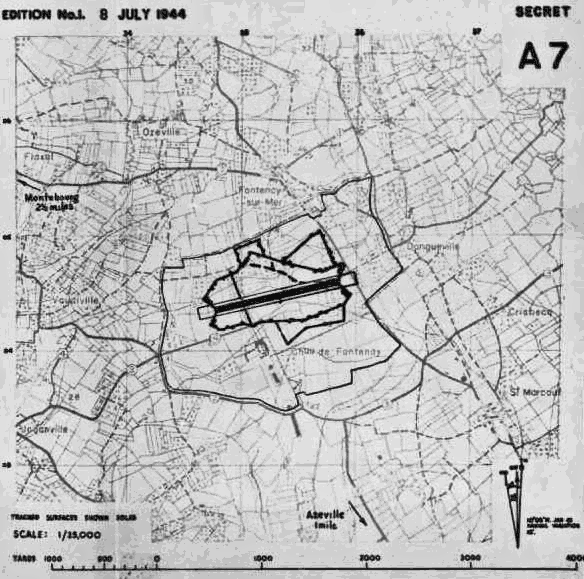
Map of USAAF Advanced Landing Ground A-7 Azeville Airfield, France

Azeville/Fontenay (Azeville) Airfield is an abandoned World War II military airfield, which is located near the commune of Azeville in the Normandy region of northern France.

Located just outside Azeville, the United States Army Air Force established a temporary airfield shortly after the Allied landings in France(D-Day) on 16 June 1944. The airfield was one of the first established in the liberated area of Normandy, being constructed by the IX Engineering Command, 819th Engineer Aviation Battalion.

== History ==
The area was formerly home to a German gun battery, which consisted of four captured French 105 mm guns. The battery was captured on 9 June 1944 by the U.S. 22nd Infantry Regiment (4th Division) moving inland from Utah Beach.

Known as Advanced Landing Ground "A-7", the airfield consisted of a single 5000' (1500m) Square-Mesh Track runway aligned 08/26. In addition, with tents were used for billeting and also for support facilities; an access road was built to the existing road infrastructure; a dump for supplies, ammunition, and gasoline drums, along with a drinkable water and minimal electrical grid for communications and station lighting.

The fighter planes flew support missions during the Allied invasion of Normandy, patrolling roads in front of the beachhead; strafing German military vehicles and dropping bombs on gun emplacements, anti-aircraft artillery and concentrations of German troops in Normandy and Brittany when spotted. On 4 September 1944, the 363d Fighter Group was realigned into a Tactical Reconnaissance Group, and its P-51D fighters were replaced with F-6 P-51 Reconnaissance aircraft

After the Americans moved east into Central France with the advancing Allied Armies, the airfield was left un-garrisoned and used for resupply and casualty evacuation. It was closed on 15 September 1944 and the land returned to agricultural use.

== Major units assigned ==
- 365th Fighter Group 28 June – 15 August 1944

386th (D5), 387th (B4), 388th (C4) Fighter Squadrons (P-47D)

- 363d Fighter Group 22 August – 14 September 1944

Re-designated 363d Tactical Reconnaissance Group, 4 September 1944

380th (A8), 381st (B3), 382d (C3) Fighter Squadrons (P-51D)

Re-designated 160th (A8), 161st (B3), 162d (C3) Tactical Reconnaissance Squadrons (F-6)

== Current use ==
Today the airfield is a mixture of various agricultural fields. A memorial to the men and units that were stationed at Azeville is located leaving Saint-Marcouf on the D14 towards Fontenay-sur-Mer. The stele is 2 km on the left edge of a pasture at the edge of the town of Fontenay-sur-Mer.

== See also ==
- Advanced Landing Ground
