= Azeville battery =

WW2 German fortification in Manche, Normandy, France

- La Batterie d'Azeville
- Part of Atlantic Wall
- Azeville, Normandy, France
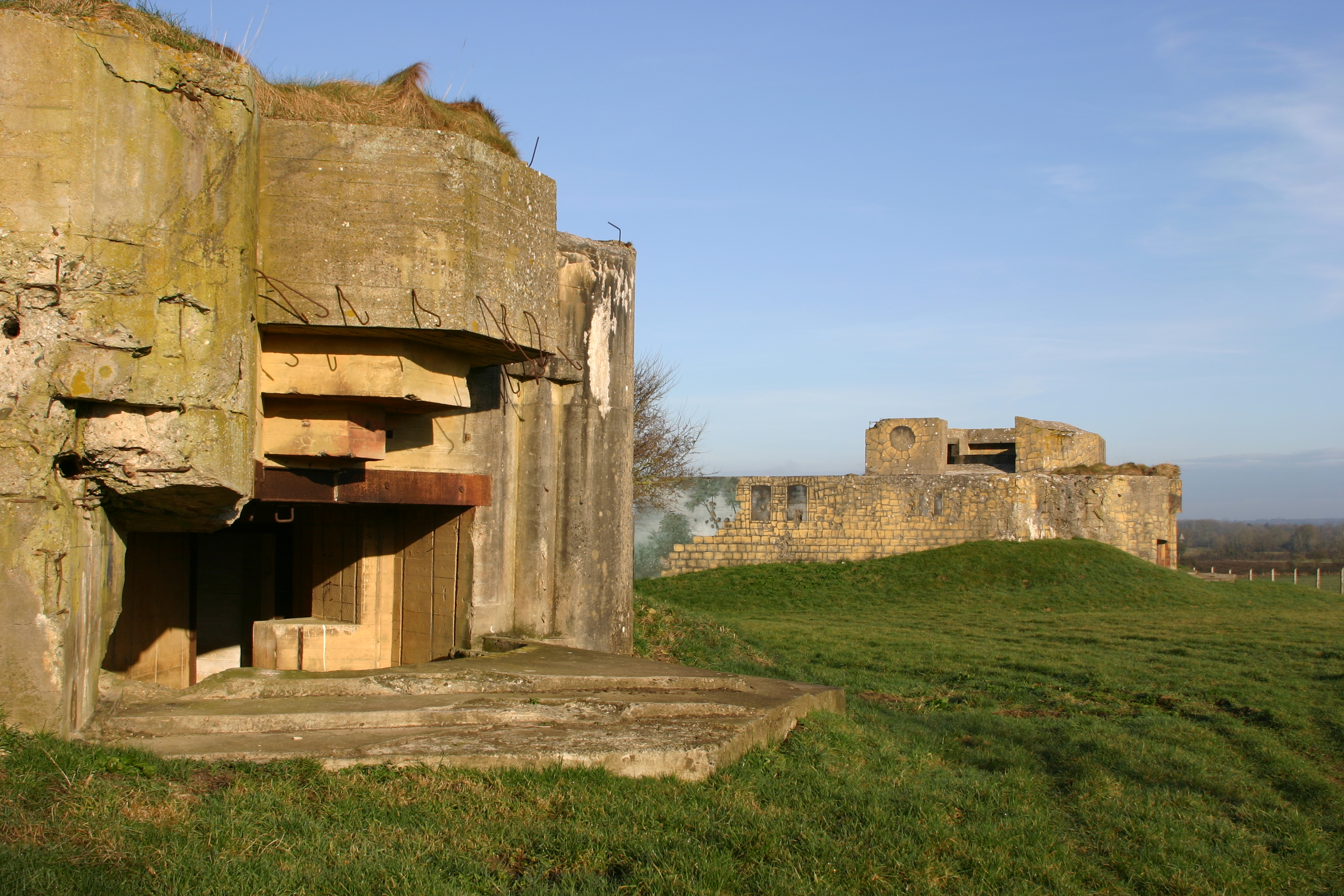
- Casemate for 105mm artillery

Site information
- Code: Stp 133
- Owner: Local council
- Open to the public: Yes
- Condition: Museum

Location
- Coordinates: 49°27′42″N 1°18′24″W

Site history
- Built: 1941
- Built by: Organisation Todt
- In use: 1944
- Materials: Concrete and steel
- Battles/wars: Invasion of Normandy

Garrison information
- Past commanders: Captain Hugo Treiber
- Garrison: Heeresküstenartillerie-Regiment 1261
- Occupants: German

The Azeville battery was a World War II German artillery battery constructed close to the French village of Azeville in the Manche department in the Normandy region in northwestern France. It formed a part of Germany's Atlantic Wall coastal fortifications and was involved in the Normandy landings and shelled the US landing beach UTAH (15 km (9.3 mi) away) for three days after D-Day, 6 June 1944. The battery was heavily bombed on 9 June 1944 and fell to the Americans the same day. The site is owned by the local council and one of the battery's gun casemates now houses a museum.

== Construction ==
The Azeville battery was one of the first defensive fortifications built by the Germans on the French coast. Construction on the site began in 1941, with installation of four First World War-era French 105mm artillery pieces in open gun pits completed in December 1941. In 1943 casemates (two standard design H650s and two H671s (H671s were similar to H650s but with rounded edges)) were built to house the artillery. Casemate No. 1 was type H671 with a 3.7cm flak gun positioned on its roof; casemate No. 2 was also type H671 and housed the battery's main command post. Casemate No. 3 and No. 4 were type H650s with another flak gun atop casemate No. 4. The four casemates were 40 m (130 ft) from each other in a line.

Each casemate was protected by two machine gun apertures, one to the left of the main entrance. Each bunker had a ready room for 12 soldiers. Each bunker had two rooms containing the shells and charges for the guns. There were approximately 300 rounds for each artillery piece. The gun embrasure has a sweep of 120 degrees and were height adjustable to 35 degrees. The 105 mm guns had a range of 12 km (7.5 mi). On each side of the gun were holes where spent cases were thrown. The gun pit had its own filter system to draw out the gases following the firing of the gun. Each gun had a crew of 25. The flak guns had a crew of five.

In addition to the casemates there were ammunition bunkers, defensive mortar pits and Tobruks fitted with machine guns plus a minefield. The bunkers were linked by 700 m (2,300 ft) of tunnels. The garrison has no on site barracks and were billeted in the surrounding villages.

The position of battery did not allow direct line-of-sight onto the surrounding beaches and fire control for the guns at Azeville was handled by the fire control bunker at the Crisbeq battery 2 km (1.2 mi) away. The bunkers were connected by armoured communication wires.

The outer walls of the casemates were painted to look like local ruined buildings.

== Garrison ==
The battery was garrisoned by 170 officers and men of the 2nd Company of the 1261 Heeresküstenartillerie-Regiment 1261 (HKAA). The battery's commander was Hauptmann (Captain) Hugo Treiber. Treiber spent most of his time at the ranging post at Crisbeq battery and the security and running of Azeville battery was in the hands of Leutnant (Lieutenant) Kattnig.

== D-Day and Normandy landings ==
Prior to the Normandy landings, the battery was subject to frequent aerial bombardments but it was still operational on D-Day, 6 June 1944. On the night of June 5/6, 1944 it was again bombed by the US air force. The battery was first attacked by 20 paratroopers of 508th Parachute Infantry Regiment, who had been dropped in the wrong area. However, the German defenders were able to hold off the lightly armed Americans. At dawn Captain Treiber drove the short distance to Crisbecq, leaving Lieutenant Kattnig in command.

The four 105 mm guns at the battery engaged Allied ships in the vicinity of Utah Beach and also shelled the beach itself throughout the morning of D-Day. In conjunction with the Crisbecq battery the shellfire from the two batteries hampered the advance of the American 4th Infantry Division. The battery was fired upon by the Allied ships but little damage was inflicted. Incoming fire from the USS Nevada hit casemate No. 4.

A number of German soldiers retreating from the Allied bridgehead at Utah took shelter at the battery - approximately 250 German soldiers were now inside the bunkers. During the morning of June 7, the American 22nd Infantry Regiment of the 4th Infantry Division launched an attack on Azeville battery. Infantry and tanks approached from the south east. The Germans opened fire using their 105 mm guns and repelled the attack. Through the night of June 7/8, the Americans attempted to surround both Azeville and Crisbeq batteries. Oberleutnant zur See (navy lieutenant) Walter Ohmsen, the commander at Crisbeq, telephoned Azeville to direct their fire onto his own battery to dislodge the American attacking his battery. The resulting fire from Azeville forced the Americans to retreat, leaving behind 90 prisoners. The same night, another attack on Azeville battery was launched by the Americans. Machine-guns and anti-aircraft flak guns on top of casemates 1 and 4 fired at the approaching American tanks and troops. The American attack petered out.

The following night (June 8/9) the battleship USS Nevada fired on Azeville and put casemate No. 1 out of action, killing all the Germans manning the gun. On the morning of June 9 a preliminary artillery and tank bombardment was followed by an attack made by the 1st and 2nd Battalion of the 22nd Infantry Regiment. The German defences however were not knocked out. The Americans brought in demolition teams to blow up the entrance of casemate No. 1. The American advance was noticed and Lt. Kattnig called in covering fire from Crisbeq to dislodge the Americans. The next tactic employed by the Americans was to use flamethrowers on casemate No. 1. The flamethrower was used to ignite munitions room. The resulting explosions killed all the bunker's defenders.

Lieutenant Kattnig, who had been seriously injured, contacted the Crisbeq command post asking for permission to surrender. At 14.30 the remaining German defenders surrendered the battery. Of the 253 Germans at the battery, 78 were killed, the rest captured and a small group escaped north.

== Gallery of bunker photographs ==
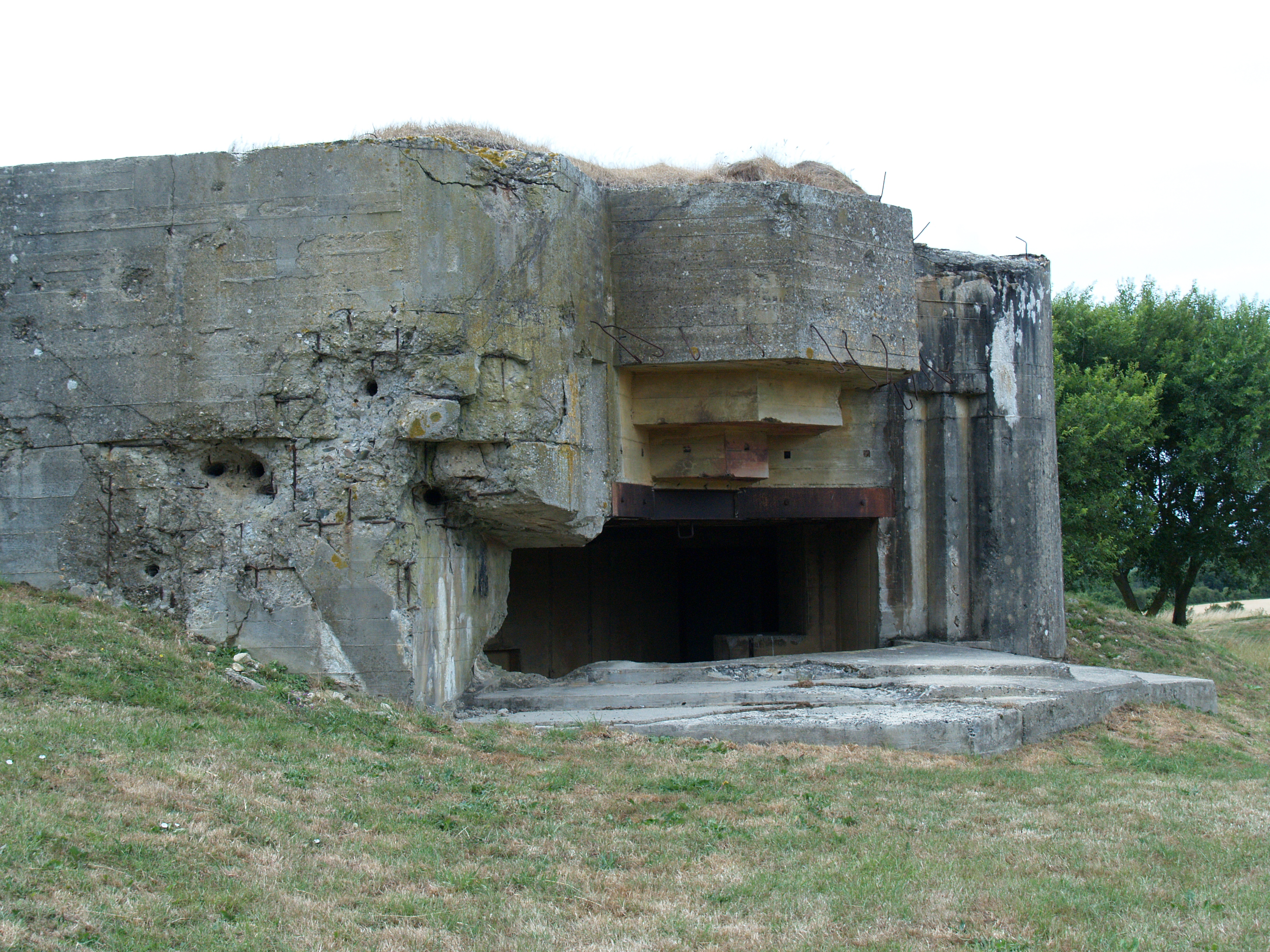
Concrete gun casemate

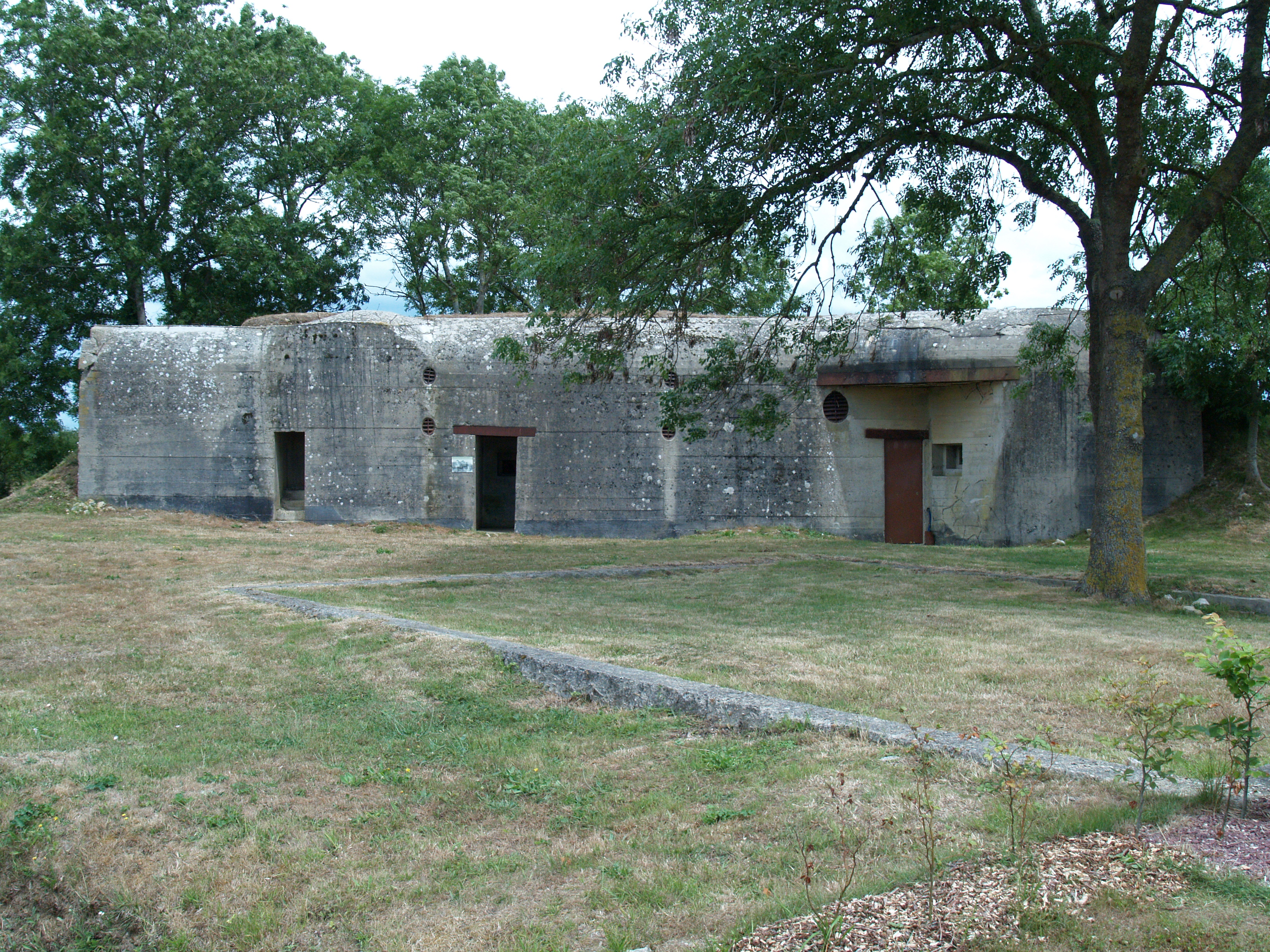
View of the rear of a gun casemate

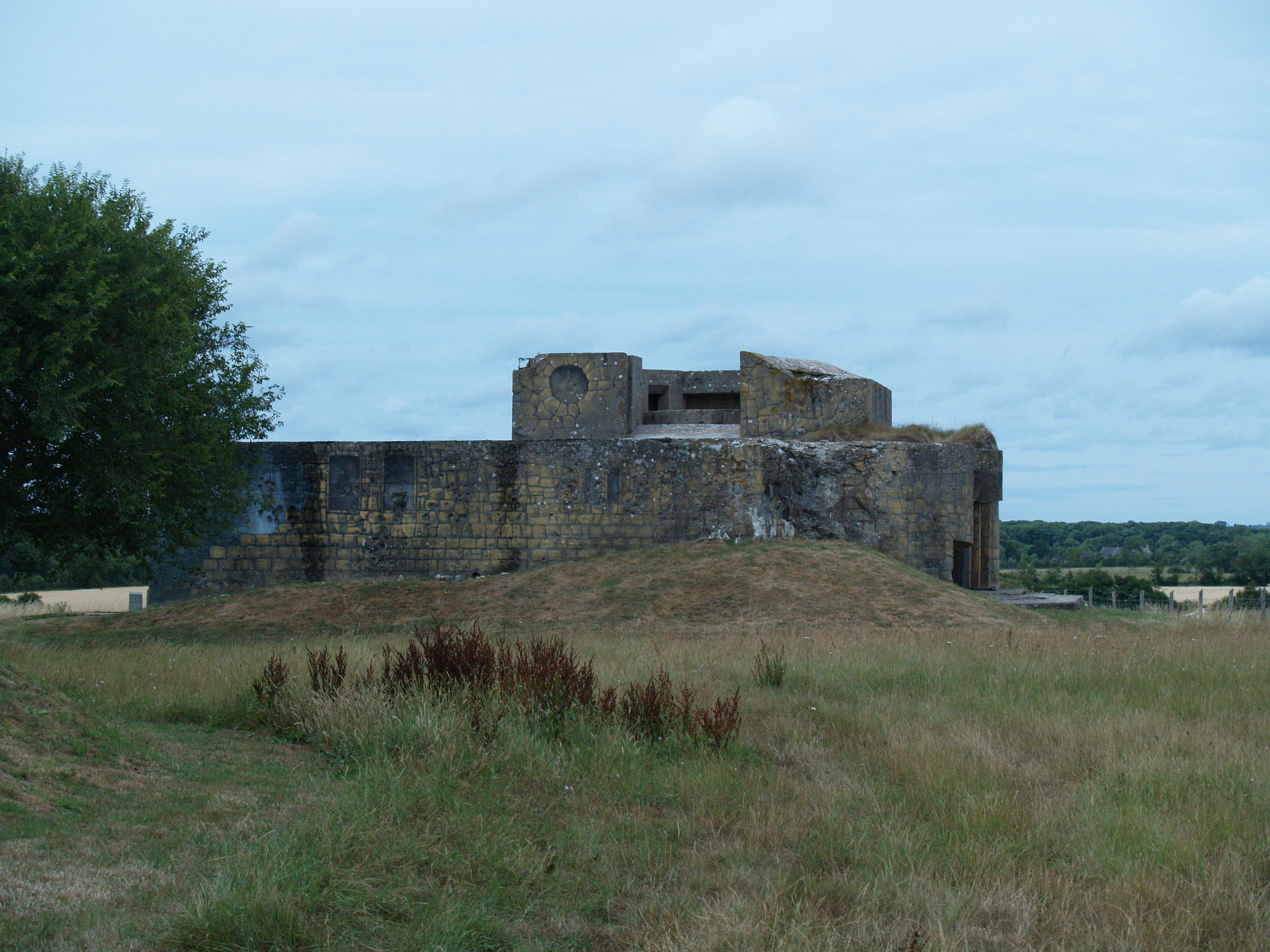
Casemate for 105 mm artillery

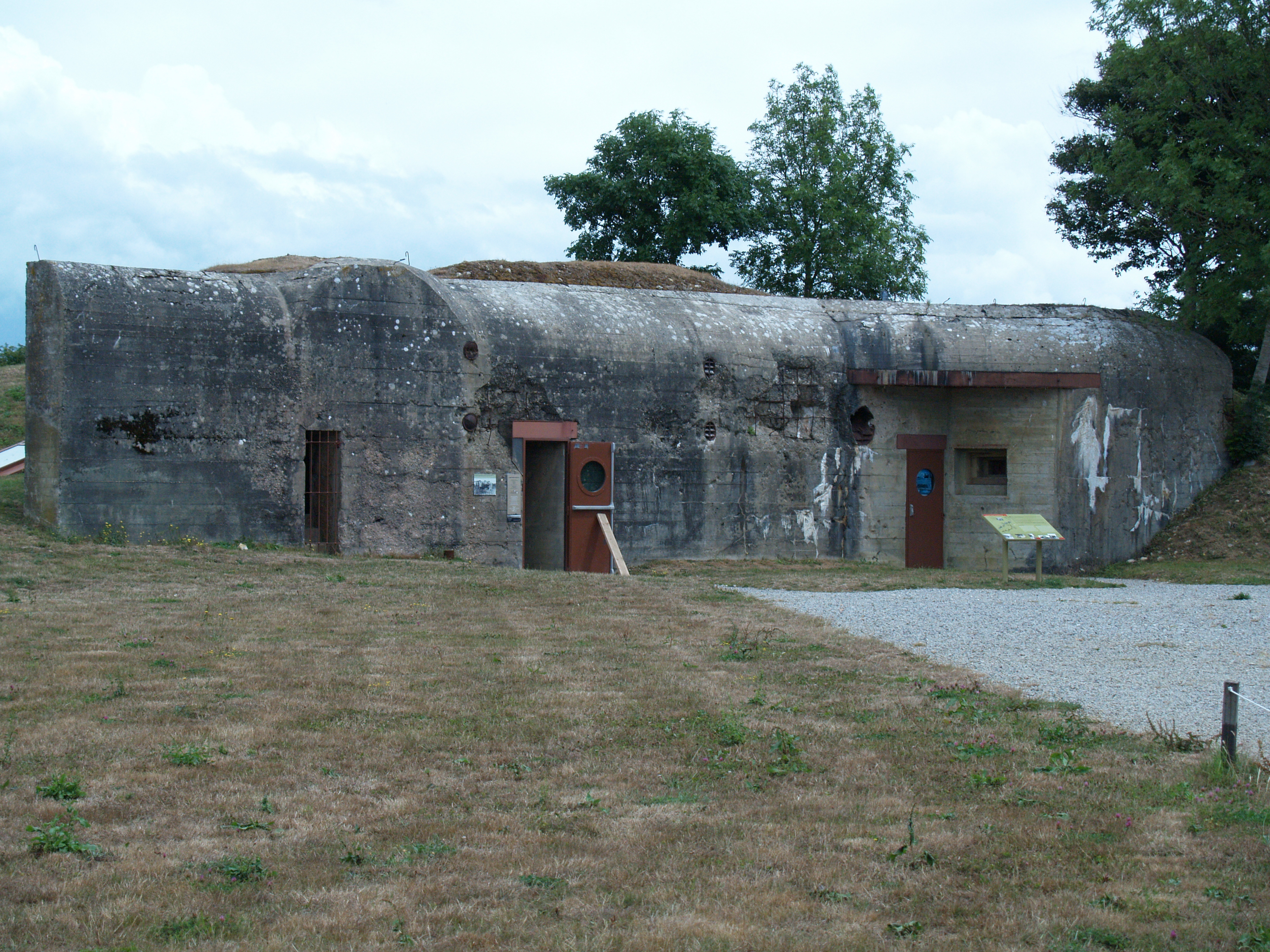
Casemate at Azeville battery

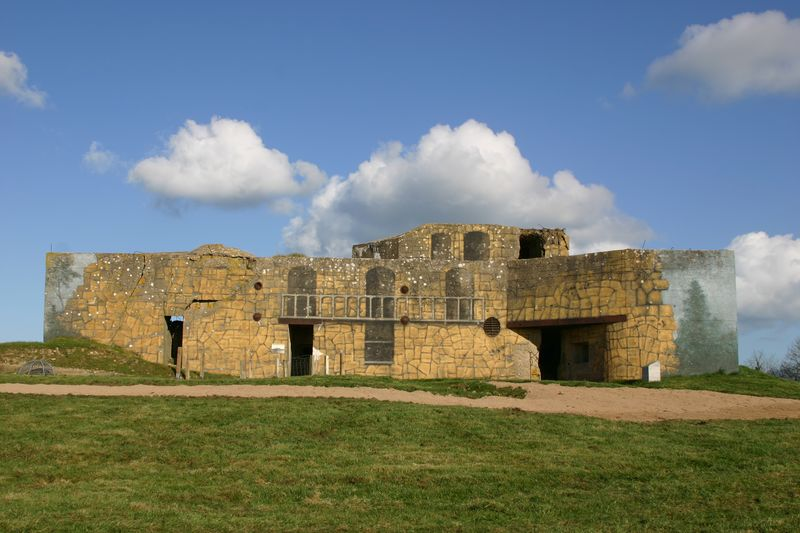
Camouflage painting on rear of casemate
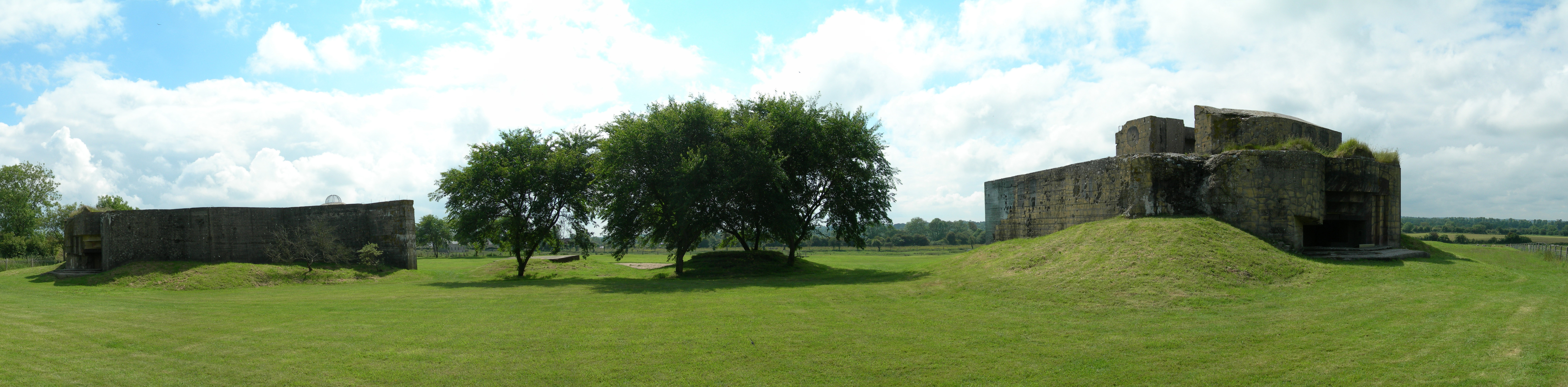
Panoramic photograph of Azeville battery

== See also ==
- Azeville Airfield - a temporary WW2 US airfield built close to the battery

== See also ==
- Crisbecq Battery
- Longues-sur-Mer battery
