= Saint-Marcouf, Manche =

Saint-Marcouf
- Commune
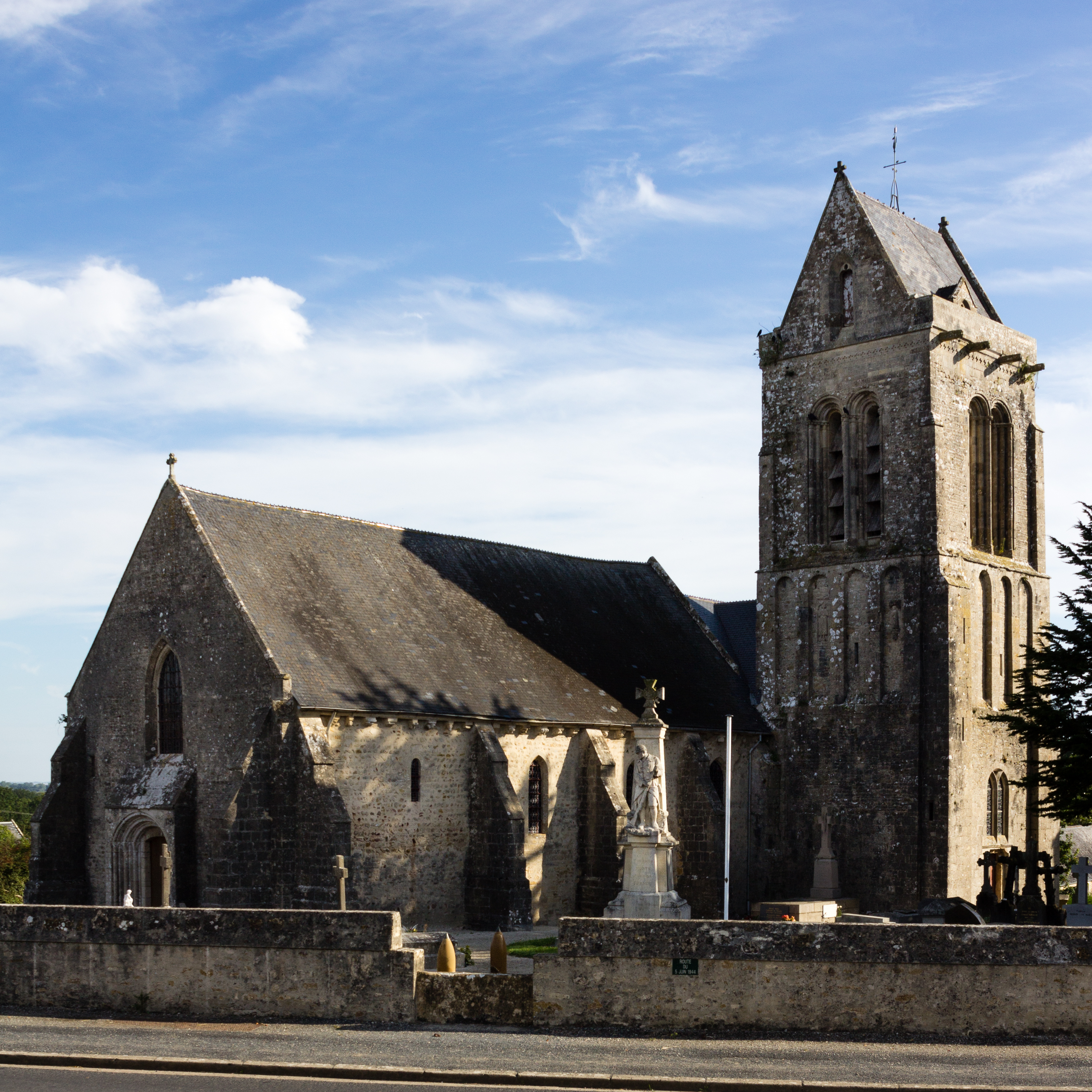
- The church of Saint-Marcouf
- Location of Saint-Marcouf
- Location within France Location within Normandy
- Coordinates: 49°28′26″N 1°17′22″W
- Country: France
- Region: Normandy
- Department: Manche
- Arrondissement: Cherbourg
- Canton: Valognes
- Intercommunality: CA Cotentin

Government
  - Mayor (2020–2026): Jean-Claude Legoupil
- Area^{1}: 13.38 km^{2} (5.17 sq mi)
- Elevation: 20 m (66 ft)
- Population (2023): 355
  - Density: 26.5/km^{2} (68.7/sq mi)
- Time zone: UTC+01:00 (CET)
  - Summer (DST): UTC+02:00 (CEST)
- INSEE/Postal code: 50507 /50310
- ^{1} French Land Register data, which excludes lakes, ponds, glaciers > 1 km^{2} (0.386 sq mi or 247 acres) and river estuaries.

Saint-Marcouf (French pronunciation: [sɛ̃ maʁkuf]) is a commune in the Manche department in Normandy in north-western France.

== Second World War ==
During the Second World War, Crisbecq Battery, a German coastal battery near the village, was bombed and fired upon by Allied forces, including as part of Operation Overlord. The battery was evacuated on June 11, 1944 by German forces.

== Heraldry ==
Arms of Saint-Marcouf	The arms of Saint-Marcouf are blazoned : Azure, two anchors in saltire, hawsers interlaced, and on a chief embattled argent a boarding cutlass point to dexter gules.

== See also ==
- Communes of the Manche department
