= Crisbecq Battery =

WW2 German fortification in Cotentin peninsula, Normandy, France

- Part of Atlantic Wall
- Normandy, France
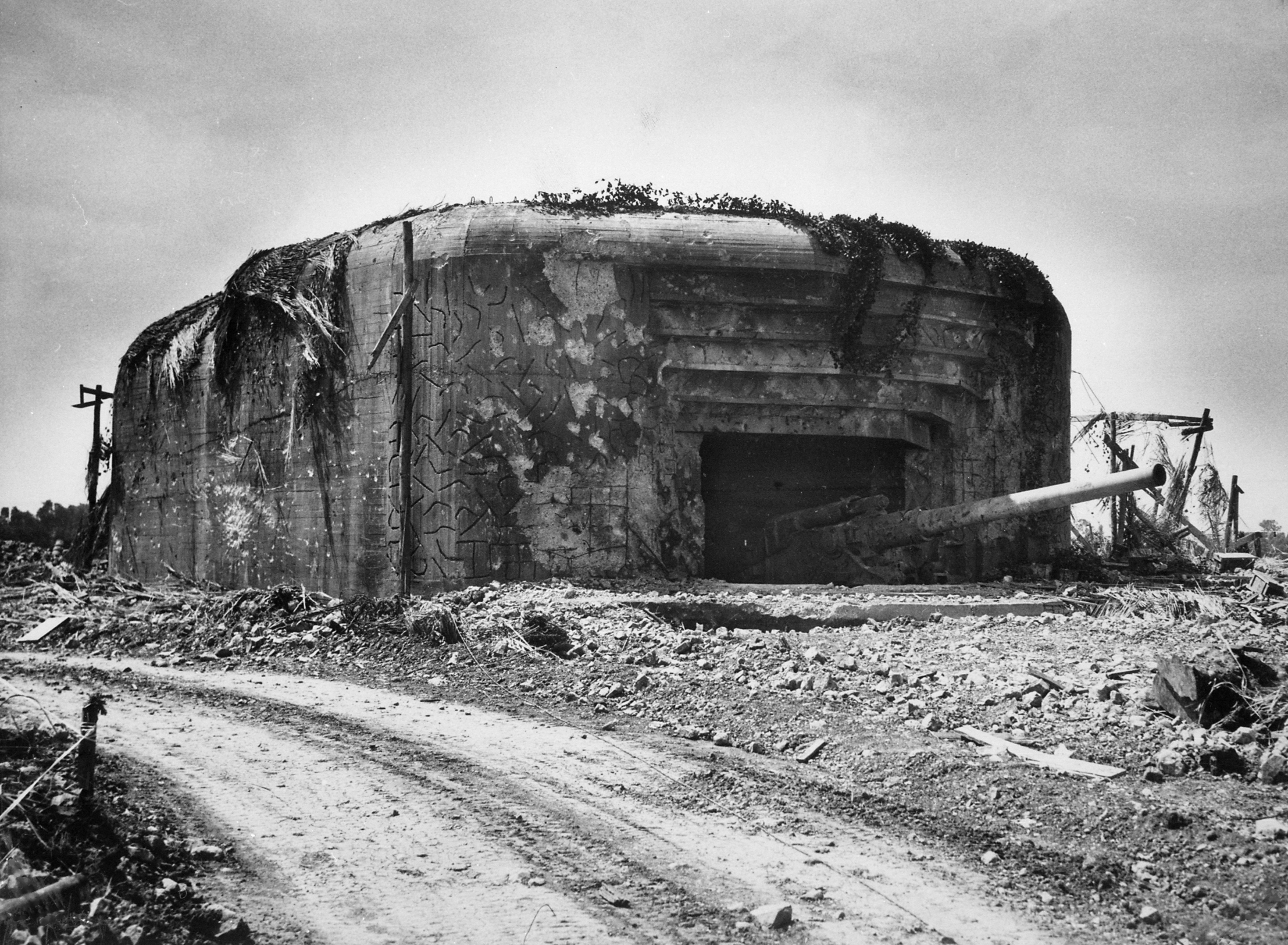
- A 210 mm Škoda gun in its casemate

- Kriegsmarine Ensign

Location
- Coordinates: 49.48°N 1.296667°W

Site history
- Built: 1941
- Built by: Organisation Todt
- In use: 1944
- Materials: Concrete and steel
- Battles/wars: Invasion of Normandy

Garrison information
- Past commanders: Walter Ohmsen
- Garrison: Kriegsmarine Marine-Artillerie-Abteilung 260
- Occupants: ~400

The Crisbecq Battery (sometimes called Marcouf Battery) was a German World War II artillery battery constructed by the Organisation Todt (Todt organization) near the French village of Saint-Marcouf in the department of Manche in the north-east of the Cotentin peninsula in Normandy. It formed a part of Nazi Germany's Atlantic Wall coastal fortifications. The main armament were three Czechoslovak 21 cm Kanone 39 cannons, two of which housed in heavily fortified casemates up to 10 feet thick of concrete. The battery, with a range of 27–33 kilometers (17–21 miles), could cover the beaches between Saint-Vaast-la-Hougue and Pointe du Hoc.

The battery engaged US ships on D-Day (6 June 1944) and was evacuated by the Germans on 11 June 1944 and took no further part in the Normandy landings.

== Construction ==
Prior to construction of Marine-Küstenbatterie "Marcouf" (Naval Coastal Battery Marcouf) or Seezielbatterie "Marcouf" (Sea Target Battery Marcouf) an alternative position on Mount Enaut, near Dodainville (roughly 1.2 kilometers (0.75 miles) south-southeast of the battery), had been considered. However, the exceptional view of the coast from Saint-Vaast-la-Hougue to Pointe du Hoc from its current position was the decisive difference.

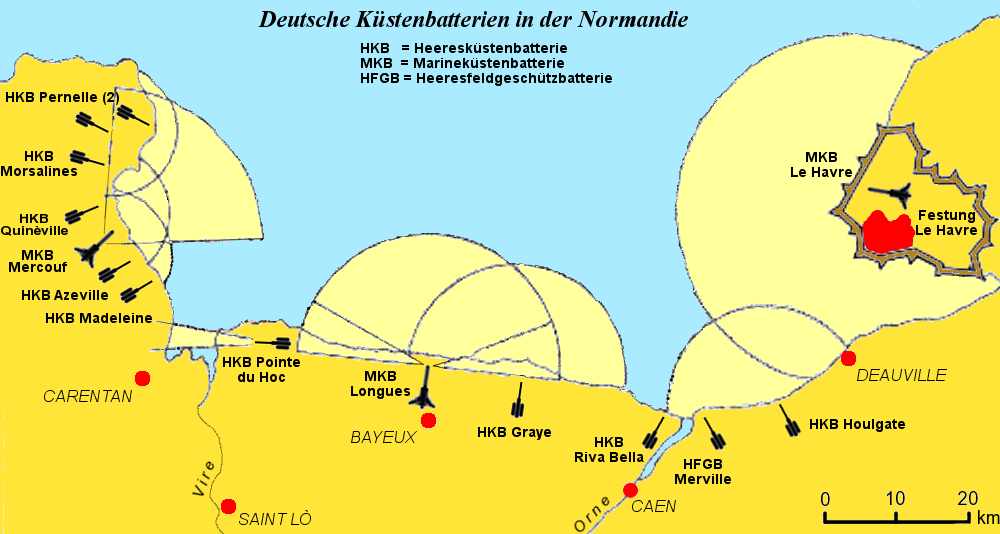
German batteries in Normandy.

Construction of the battery began in mid-1941 by the Organisation Todt. Initially, the labourers were Russian and Polish prisoners of war, in later 1943, the workforce was augmented by hired workers from France. The original armament planned for the battery was four 210 mm navy guns (21 cm Kanone 39), six 75 mm anti-aircraft guns (Canon de 75 modèle 1897) and one 150 mm gun in an open firing pit.

Due to ordnance supply problems, the site instead consisted of three 210 mm navy guns, with only two of them protected by large concrete casemates, a command post, shelters for personnel and ammunition, and several defensive machine-gun emplacements. The site also had several natural defensive features. Any attack on the fort could be prosecuted only by moving along a narrow trail. On the western side lay open fields, while the eastern side consisted of swamps or deep slopes. Except for the Cherbourg and Le Havre harbour batteries, it was the most powerful battery in the bay of the Seine with a range of more than 30 km (19 mi). The first 210 mm gun was installed on the 19th of April, 1942.

== Garrison ==
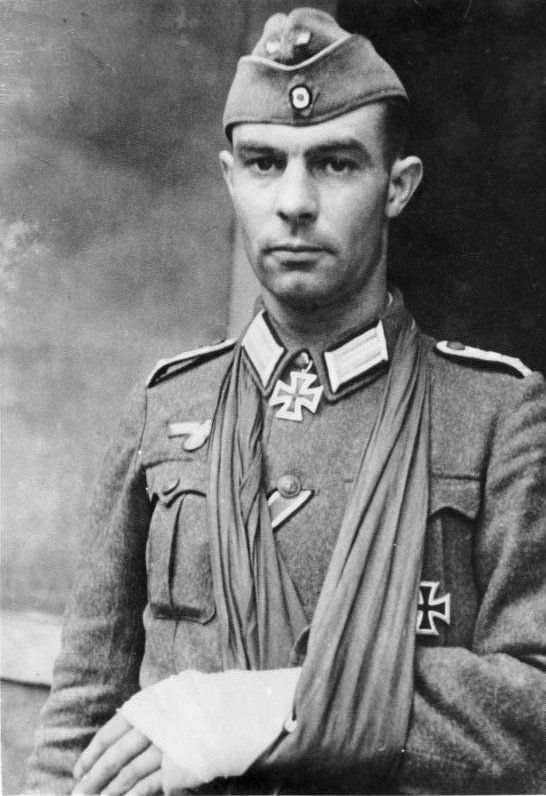
Ohmsen on 14 June 1944

The garrison, including the battery commander Oberleutnant zur See (≈ lieutenant junior grade) Walter Ohmsen, consisted of three officers, 24 non-commissioned officers and 287 men of the Kriegsmarine. The unit was subordinated to the Marine-Artillerie-Abteilung 260 (M.A.A. 260—260th Naval Coastal Artillery Battalion). The battery's personnel was further augmented by members of the 6./Grenadier-Regiment 919 (6th Company, 919th Grenadier Regiment) of the 709. Infanterie-Division (709th Infantry Division) for ground defense under the command of Leutnant Geissler, which brought the overall manpower of the battery close to 400 men.

M.A.A. 260 was commanded by Kapitänleutnant (≈ lieutenant) Karl Wiese in Cherbourg. The overall command was with the Kommandant der Seeverteidigung Normandie (commander of sea defence Normandy), Konteradmiral (Rear Admiral) Walter Hennecke.

== Normandy landings ==
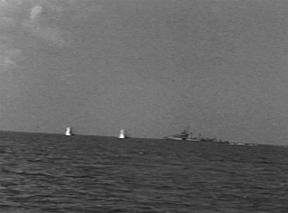
Two near misses from the shore batteries against USS Corry.

Prior to the Normandy landings, the battery was subject to frequent aerial bombardments but it was still operational on D-Day, 6 June 1944. At 5 a.m. on 6 June 1944, the commander of the Crisbecq battery was the first to sight the Allied invasion fleet through the battery rangefinder. He immediately reported his observation to the Kriegsmarine headquarters at Cherbourg, which triggered the German alarm throughout installations on the Atlantic coast. At 5:52 a.m. the order was given to open fire on the ships, which were then 17 kilometers (11 miles) away. At 5:55 a.m., Crisbecq battery targeted and exchanged fire with the cruisers USS Tuscaloosa and USS Quincy and the battleship USS Nevada. At 6:30 a.m., the battery fired upon the US destroyer USS Corry and sank her.

At 8 a.m., Nevada hit the foremost casemated gun. The US battleships USS Texas and USS Arkansas, originally assigned to provide covering fire for the landing at Omaha Beach, intervened to help silence the Crisbecq battery. At 9 a.m. the concentrated fire of the three battleships put the second casemate out of action, when a shell from Nevada pierced the embrasure, killing the entire crew. The remaining gun behind casemate No. 24, withstood the naval bombardment, but was incapable of reaching targets out at sea; the gun initiated fire at 11 a.m., directed to the beach facing WN 5 (Widerstandsnest 5 – Resistance Nest 5), 10 kilometers (6.2 miles). It caused heavy losses among the Americans and hindered the landing of material and reinforcements at Utah Beach.

The American 1st Battalion, 22nd Infantry Regiment, 4th Infantry Division started their advance towards Saint-Marcouf and the Crisbecq battery at 7 a.m. on 7 June. After the first assault they succeeded in entering Saint-Marcouf but were stopped in front of the battery by the 75mm flak guns that had been repaired and were put in firing positions against ground targets. A German counterattack on the flanks of the American forces, supported by the 105 mm K331 (f) guns from the Azeville battery forced Captain Tom Shields to withdraw. Among the American dead was Preston Niland, one of the Niland brothers. Concurrent to this ground fighting, the artillery duel between the Crisbecq battery and the Allied fleet continued. One of the Škoda 210 mm gun K39/41 had been put back into service during the previous night. The gun was damaged once more and remained silent for the rest of the day. The Americans brought several field artillery guns into position during the afternoon and immediately started firing at the battery. Subsequently, the battery was subjected to harassing fire every night.

The American 1st Battalion started their second attack on the battery at 10 a.m. on 8 June and retook the village of Saint-Marcouf. At 1:30 p.m. after naval artillery had prepared the attack with a 20-minute bombardment and rolling artillery fire, the attack on the battery continued. The Americans succeeded in entering the battery perimeter. The Germans had fallen back in the shelters but the last 210 mm gun was destroyed. At 4 p.m., American forces started to blow up the shelters; seeing that his forces had been overwhelmed, Walter Ohmsen, commander of the Crisbecq battery, ordered the Azeville Battery to fire on his own position with its four 105 mm guns to force the attackers away. The effect was immediate and the Americans fell back in disarray. Ohmsen took advantage of the situation and counterattacked with the support of Leutnant Geissler's 6th company, and pushed the Americans back to Dodainville (roughly 1.2 kilometers (0.75 miles) south-southeast of the battery). American casualties reached 15% of the forces they had committed to the attack and 98 soldiers were taken prisoner.

By the morning of 11 June, the battery and its staff had run out of ammunition and medical equipment for the wounded and all the guns were out of service. In the afternoon, Walter Ohmsen received a phone call from Konteradmiral Walter Hennecke, who instructed him to escape with the survivors. Leaving 21 wounded German soldiers and 126 American prisoners behind, Ohmsen and 78 men broke through the American encirclement and reached the German lines at Aumeville, roughly 8 kilometers (5.0 miles) away.

== See also ==
- Maisy battery
- Longues-sur-Mer battery
