= Longues-sur-Mer battery =

WW2 German fortification between Gold and Omaha Beaches, Normandy

Longues-sur-Mer Battery
- Marineküstenbatterie (MKB) Longues-sur-Mer
- Part of Atlantic Wall
- Normandy, France
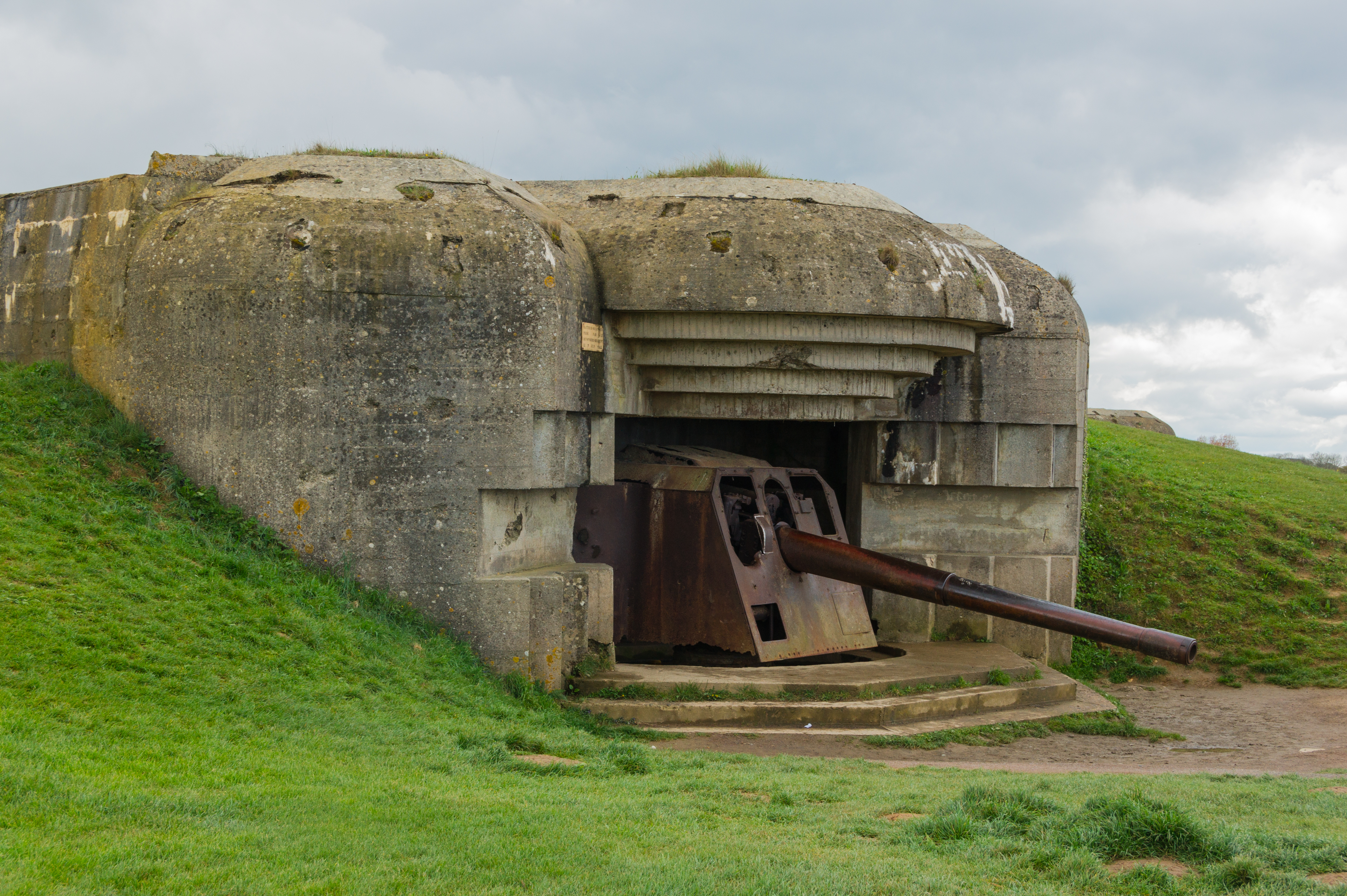
- A gun emplacement at Longues-sur-Mer battery

Site information
- Code: Wiederstandsnest (Wn) 48
- Owner: Conservatoire du littoral
- Open to the public: All casemates are open to public
- Condition: Four casemates with naval guns plus fire control bunker in fair to good condition

Location
- Coordinates: 49.3435°N 0.6950°W

Site history
- Built: September 1943 to April 1944
- Built by: Organisation Todt
- In use: 6–7 June 1944
- Materials: Concrete and rebar
- Battles/wars: Battle of Normandy
- Events: D-Day landings

Garrison information
- Garrison: Kriegsmarine, then Wehrmacht
- Occupants: ~185

The Longues-sur-Mer battery (German: Marineküstenbatterie (MKB) Longues-sur-Mer; also designated Widerstandsnest (Wn) 48) is a World War II German coastal artillery battery approximately 1 km (0.62 mi) north of the village of Longues-sur-Mer in Normandy, France. The battery is sited on a 60 m (200 ft) cliff overlooking the Baie de Seine and formed a part of Germany's Atlantic Wall coastal fortifications, between the Allied landing sectors of Gold Beach and Omaha Beach.

The battery shelled Allied naval forces off Gold and Omaha beaches on D-Day (6 June 1944), but was damaged by Allied shore bombardment the same day. It was captured on 7 June 1944 by British ground forces, playing no further part in the Normandy campaign.

The battery is the only one in Normandy to retain several of its original guns. It was listed as a historical monument in October 2001, and remains in a good state of conservation.

== Construction ==
The battery is located halfway between Port-en-Bessin in the west and Arromanches-les-Bains in the east and 8 km (5.0 mi) north of Bayeux. Construction of the battery by Organisation Todt began in September 1943 and was completed by April 1944. The battery was initially manned by Kriegsmarine personnel, but was transferred to the Heer in late 1943. The battery had a garrison of 184 officers and men.

Four type M272 regelbau ("standard design") casemates requiring 600 cubic metres of concrete and four tons of reinforcing steel were built, with walls and roofs over 2 m (6.6 ft) thick. Each casemate held a 15 cm TbtsK C/36 naval gun, manufactured by the German-controlled Škoda Works in Plzeň, Czechoslovakia, with a range of approximately 20 km (12 mi) and a rate of fire of six to eight rounds per minute. The guns were positioned on a central pivot mount (Mittelpivotlafette or MPL) TL C/36. Behind each gun were magazines containing the shells and propellant charges.

Fire control was managed from a regelbau type M262A two-story command post located on the cliff edge 300 m (980 ft) forward of the guns. It was equipped with some of the most technically advanced fire-control systems available in Normandy and was connected to each gun via an armoured electrical communication system.

Also situated at the battery were ammunition bunkers and shelters for defending troops. Three 20 mm anti-aircraft guns were placed at the battery with a searchlight. Around the battery was a minefield, barbed wire fences and machine-gun and mortar pits for defence. A captured Soviet 12,2 cm K.390/1(r) gun was also sited in an open gun pit close to the entrance to the battery.

== Normandy landings ==
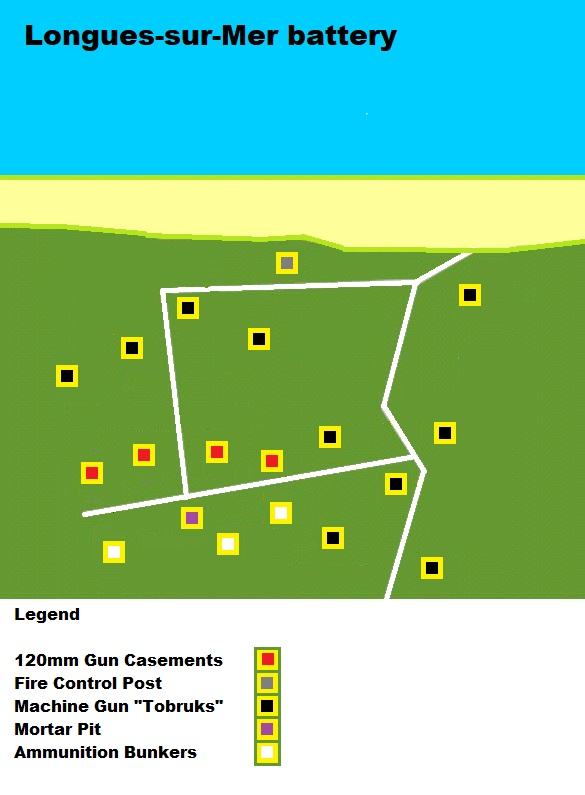
Plan of Longues-sur-Mer gun battery, Normandy

The battery at Longues-sur-Mer was situated between Omaha Beach and Gold Beach. In the build up to D-Day, the battery was attacked several times by Allied aircraft. On the evening of 5/6 June 1944 the battery was attacked by bombers, severing the armoured communication system, but little damage was inflicted on the casemates. A large amount of the bombs dropped hit the nearby village. The fire control post reverted to visual signals to control the guns, but this affected their accuracy.

The aerial attack was followed at 05:37 on 6 June by shore bombardment from the Royal Navy light cruiser HMS Ajax. The battery returned fire at 06:05, and at 06:20 targeted the headquarters ship for Gold Beach, HMS Bulolo, which withdrew out of range.

At 08:00 Ajax and HMS Argonaut again engaged the battery. At 08:45 the battery's guns ceased fire temporarily as the Germans undertook repairs. The heaviest damage from this Allied bombardment was the explosion of the ammunition for an anti-aircraft gun, mounted by the Germans on the roof of casemate No. 4, which killed several German soldiers.

After effecting repairs the battery once again opened fire, this time towards Omaha Beach. The French cruisers Georges Leygues and Montcalm, assisted by the World War I vintage dreadnought USS Arkansas, returned fire, knocking out one casemate and damaging two others. The still-active fourth gun fired intermittently during the afternoon and evening of D-Day but had little impact on the Allied landings. The battery had fired over 100 rounds throughout the day. After a second Allied air bombardment on the morning of 7 June, the surviving German troops (approximately 120 men, half of them over 40 years old) surrendered with minimal resistance to British troops of C Company of the 2nd Battalion, Devonshire Regiment at midday.

== Advanced Landing Ground B-11 ==
After the D-Day landings, the Royal Air Force (RAF) built a temporary airstrip 300 m (330 yd) east of the battery. Designated Advanced Landing Ground (ALG) B-11, the airstrip was active between 21 June to 4 September 1944, and used by the No. 125 (Fighter) Wing of the RAF Second Tactical Air Force flying Spitfires, and by the French air ace Pierre Clostermann.

== Gallery of bunker photographs ==
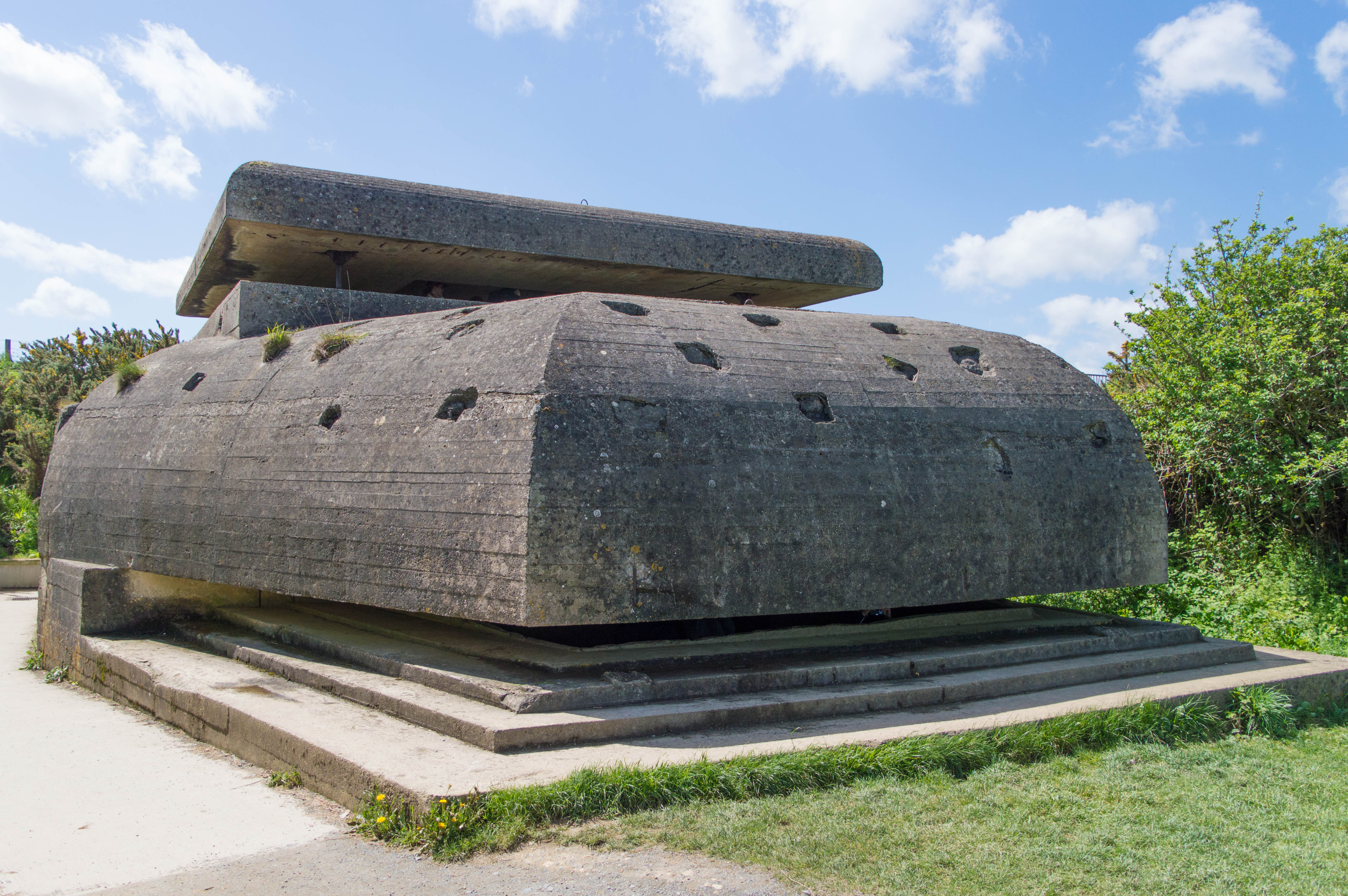
Fire control command post on the cliff edge

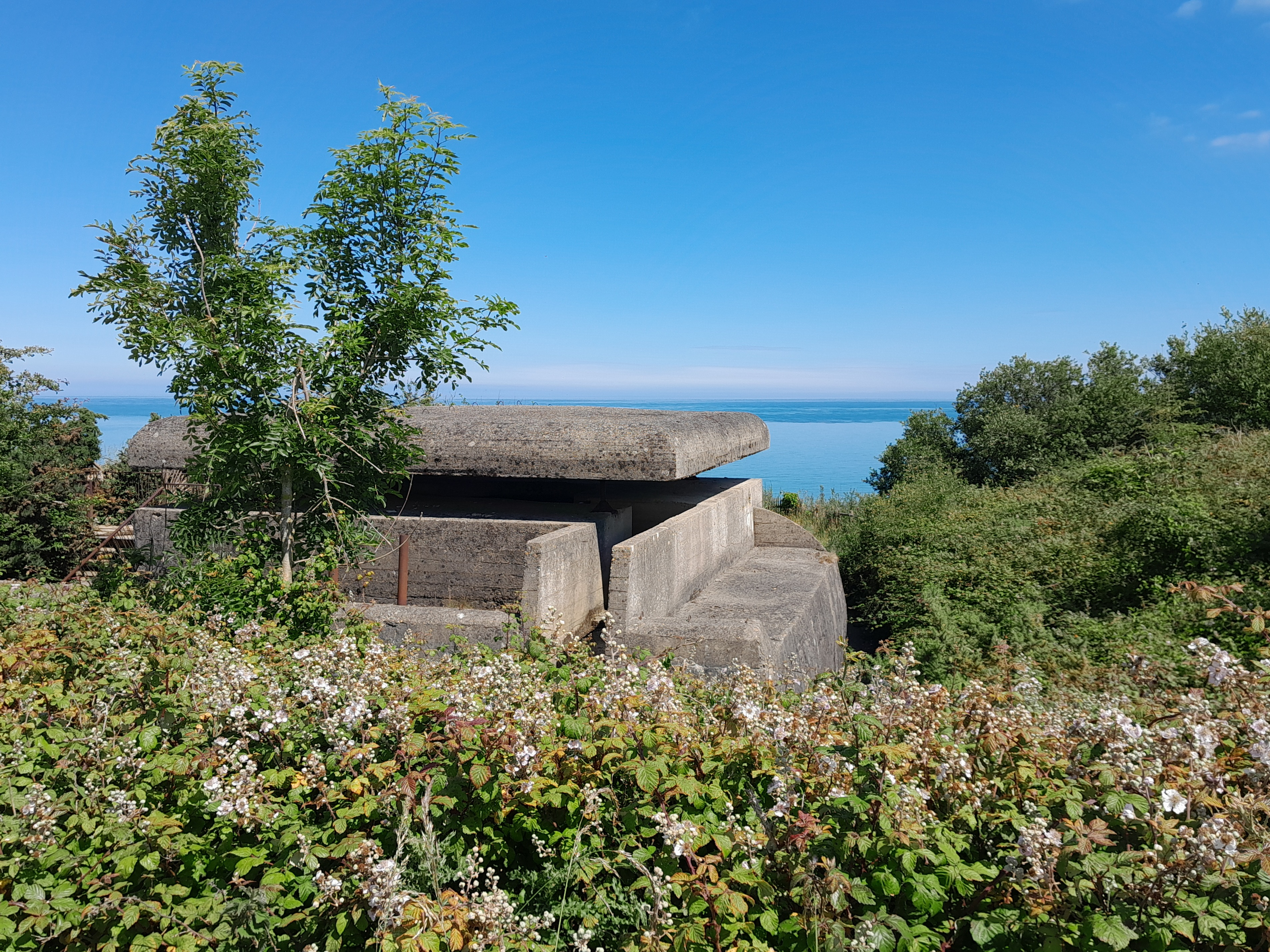
Fire control command post from rear

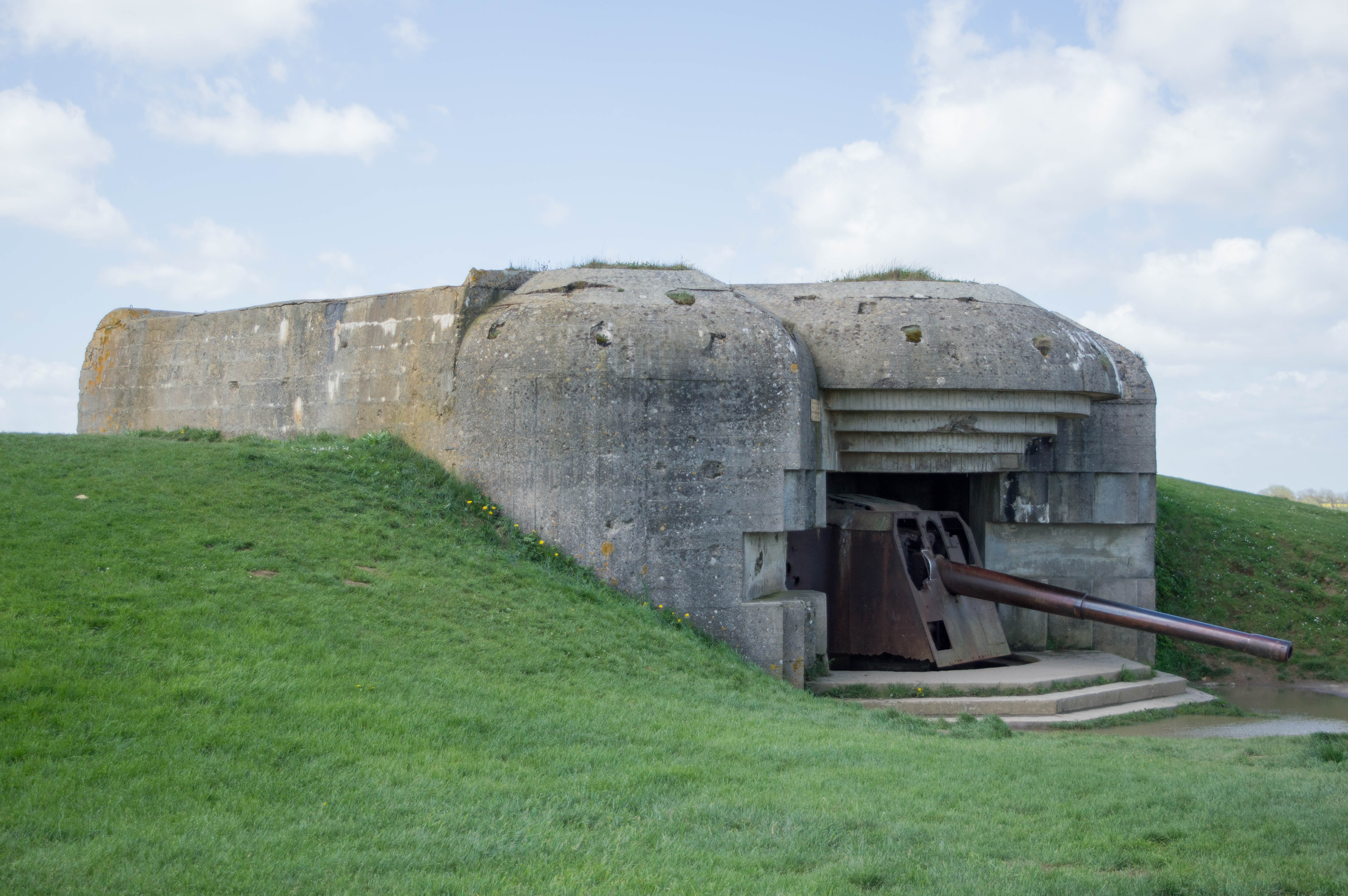
Casemate No. 2

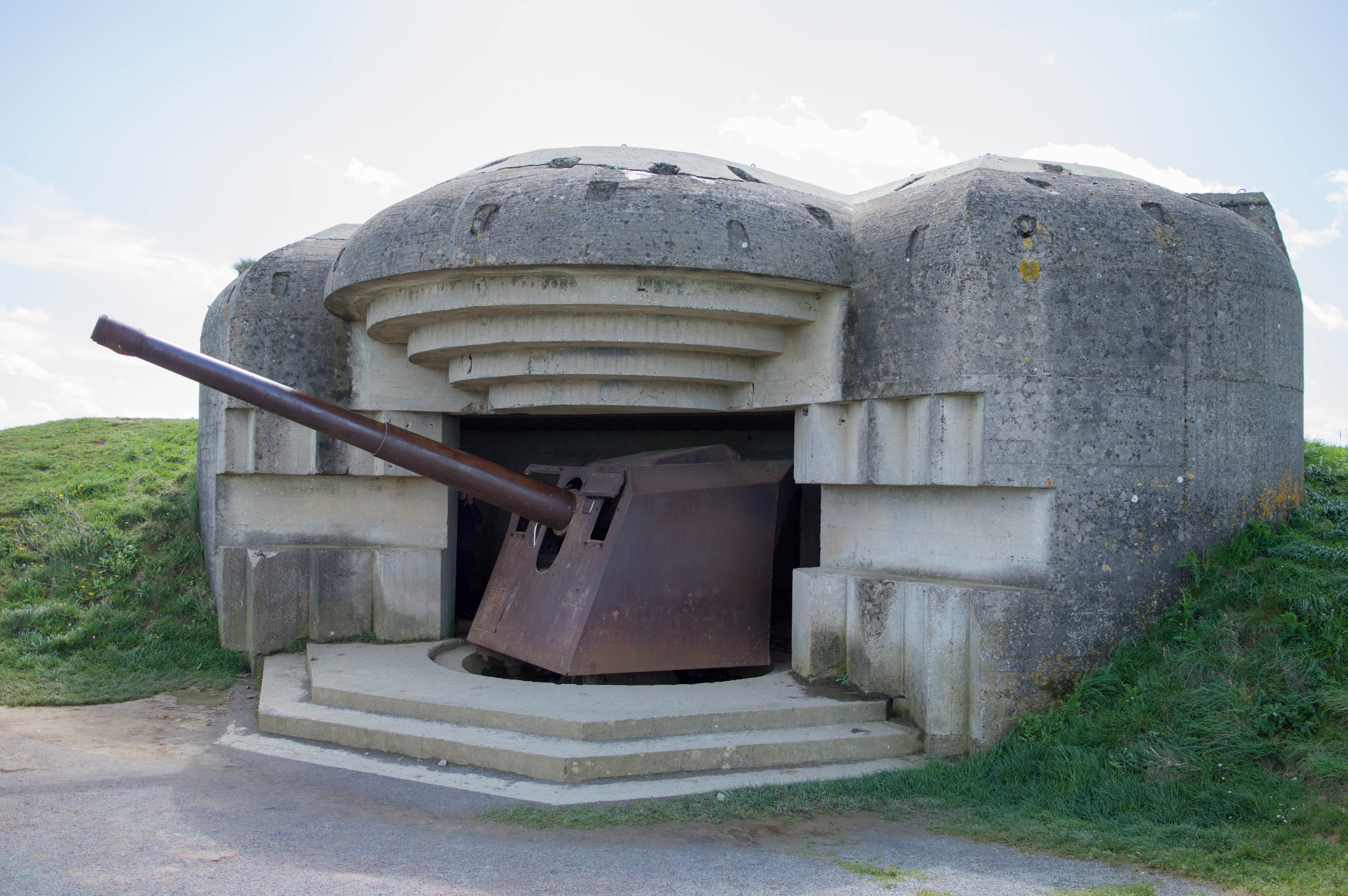
Casemate No. 3

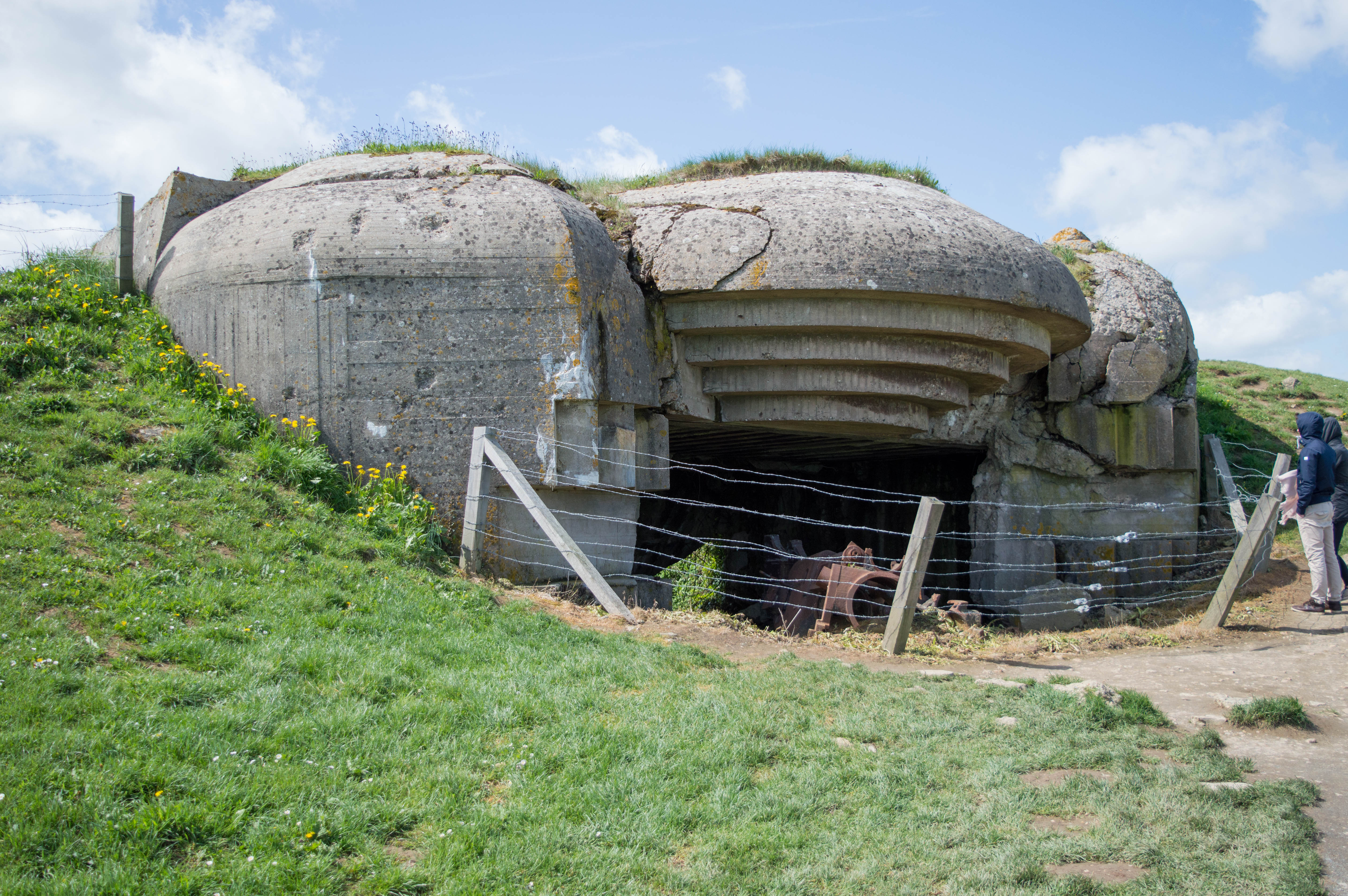
Casemate No. 4

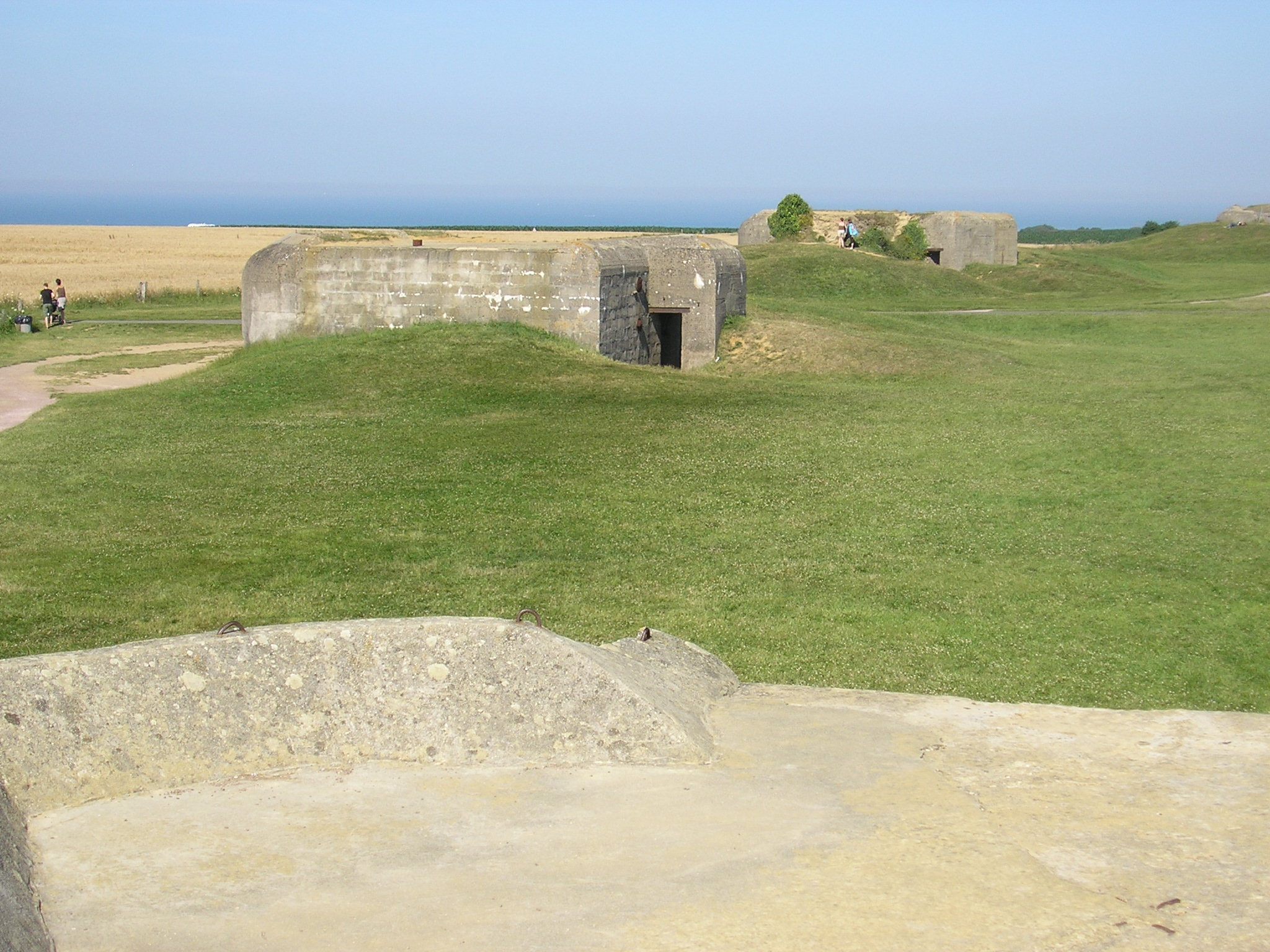
Lines of casemates at Longues-sur-Mer

== See also ==
- Azeville battery
- Crisbecq Battery
- Maisy battery
- Merville Gun Battery
