= Banville =

Banville can refer to:

== Places ==
- Banville, Calvados, a commune in the Calvados department of the Normandy region of north-western France
- Charles-B.-Banville Ecological Reserve, a nature reserve in Quebec, Canada

== People ==
- John Banville (born 1945), Irish novelist
- Melanie Louise Banville (born 1987), Canadian gymnast
- Théodore de Banville (1823–1891), French poet and writer
