= Juno Beach =

Code name for an amphibious landing zone on D-Day

Coordinates: 49°20′07″N 0°24′55″W

- Part of the Normandy landings and the Battle of Caen
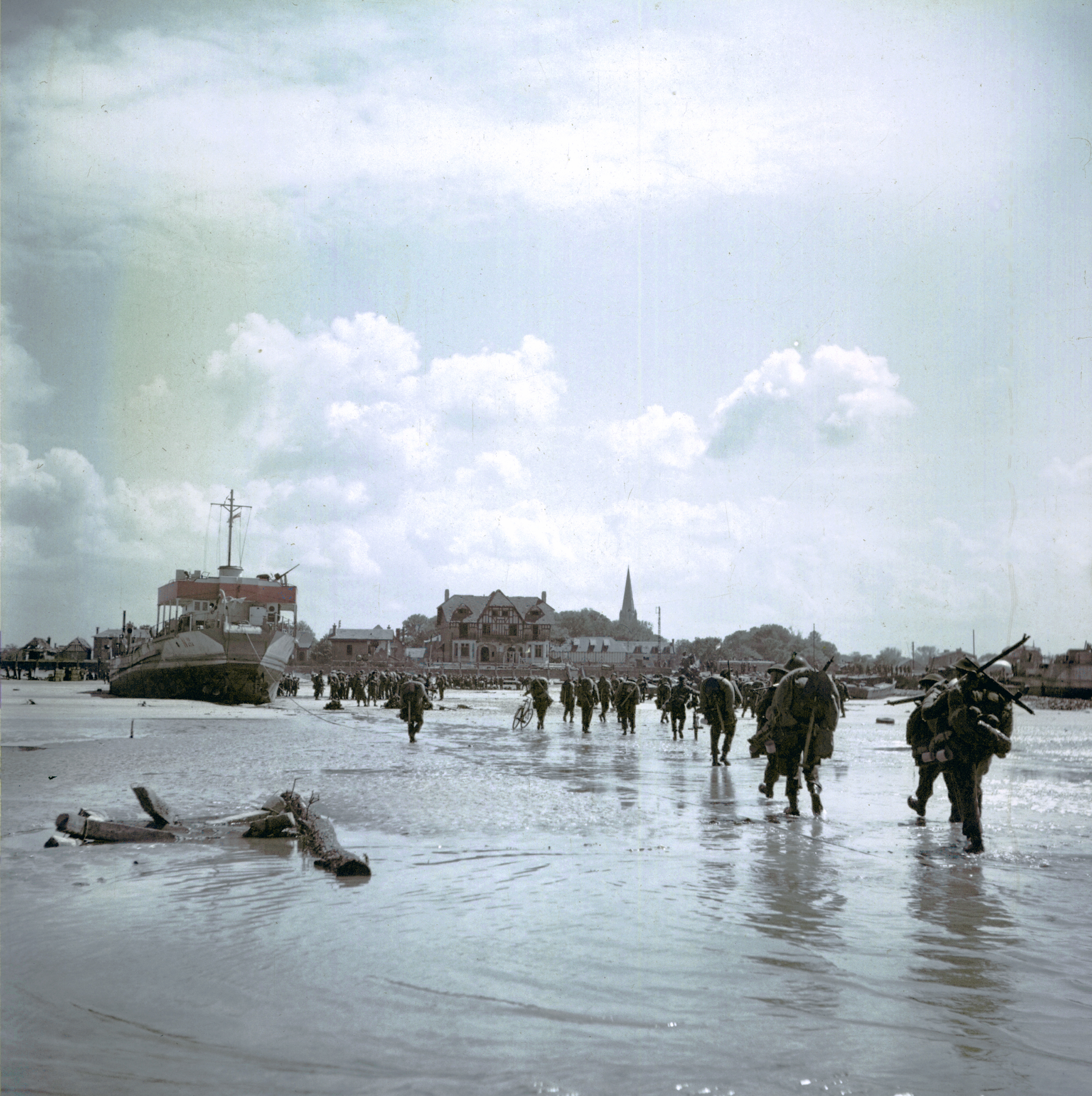
- Canadian soldiers landing at Juno on the outskirts of Bernières.
| Date | 6 June 1944 |
| Location | Courseulles, Saint-Aubin and Bernières, in the department of Calvados, France |
| Result | Allied victory |

Belligerents
| Canada; United Kingdom; Free France; Norway | Germany |

Commanders and leaders
| John Crocker; Rod Keller; Geoffrey Oliver | Wilhelm Richter |

Units involved
| 3rd Infantry Division; 2nd Armoured Brigade; No. 46 (Royal Marine) Commando; No. 48 (Royal Marine) Commando | Company, 716th Grenadier Regiment; 21st Panzer Division |

Strength
| 1 infantry division; 1 armoured brigade; 2 commando battalions | Elements of 1 infantry division |

Casualties and losses
| 961 casualties: 340 dead; 574 wounded; 47 captured | Unknown, likely heavy |

Juno Beach was one of five beaches of the Allied invasion of German-occupied France in the Normandy landings on 6 June 1944 during the Second World War. The beach spanned from Courseulles, a village just east of the British beach Gold, to Saint-Aubin-sur-Mer, and just west of the British beach Sword. Taking Juno was the responsibility of the British Second Army with the 3rd Canadian Infantry Division landing as the assault force, transported and supported by a Royal Navy task force. The objectives on D-Day were to cut the Caen-Bayeux road, seize Carpiquet airport west of Caen, and form a link between the two British beaches on either flank.

The invasion plan called for two brigades of the 3rd Canadian Division to land on two beach sectors—Mike and Nan—focusing on Courseulles, Bernières and Saint-Aubin. (Note: These villages are now named Courseulles-sur-Mer (on sea), Bernières-sur-Mer and Saint-Aubin-sur-Mer but military historians usually use the shorter names.) It was hoped that the preliminary naval and air bombardments would soften up the beach defences and destroy coastal strong points. Close support on the beaches was to be provided by amphibious tanks of the 2nd Canadian Armoured Brigade and specialized armoured vehicles of the 79th Armoured Division of the United Kingdom. Once the landing zones were secured, the plan called for the 9th Canadian Infantry Brigade to land reserve battalions and deploy inland, the Royal Marine commandos to establish contact with the British 3rd Infantry Division on Sword and the 7th Canadian Infantry Brigade to link up with the British 50th Infantry Division on Gold. The 3rd Canadian Division's D-Day objectives were to capture Carpiquet Airfield and reach the Caen–Bayeux railway line by nightfall. The beach was defended by two battalions of the German 716th Infantry Division, with elements of the 21st Panzer Division held in reserve near Caen.

The landings encountered heavy resistance from the German 716th Division; the preliminary bombardment proved less effective than had been hoped, and rough weather forced the first wave to be delayed until 07:35. Several assault companies—notably those of the Royal Winnipeg Rifles and the Queen's Own Rifles of Canada—took heavy casualties in the opening minutes of the first wave. Strength of numbers, coordinated fire support from artillery, and armoured squadrons cleared most of the coastal defences within two hours of landing. The reserves of the 7th and 8th brigades began deploying at 08:30 (along with the Royal Marines), while the 9th Brigade began its deployment at 11:40.

The subsequent push inland towards Carpiquet and the Caen–Bayeux railway line achieved mixed results. The sheer numbers of men and vehicles on the beaches created lengthy delays between the landing of the 9th Brigade and the beginning of substantive attacks to the south. The 7th Brigade encountered heavy initial opposition before pushing south and making contact with the British 50th Division at Creully. The 8th Brigade encountered heavy resistance from a battalion of the 716th at Tailleville, while the 9th Brigade deployed towards Carpiquet early in the evening. Resistance in Saint-Aubin prevented the Royal Marines from establishing contact with the British 3rd Division on Sword. By the time all operations on the Anglo-Canadian front were ordered to halt at 21:00, the 3rd Canadian Infantry Division had succeeded in pushing farther inland than any other landing force on D-Day.

== Background ==
=== Invasion of Normandy ===
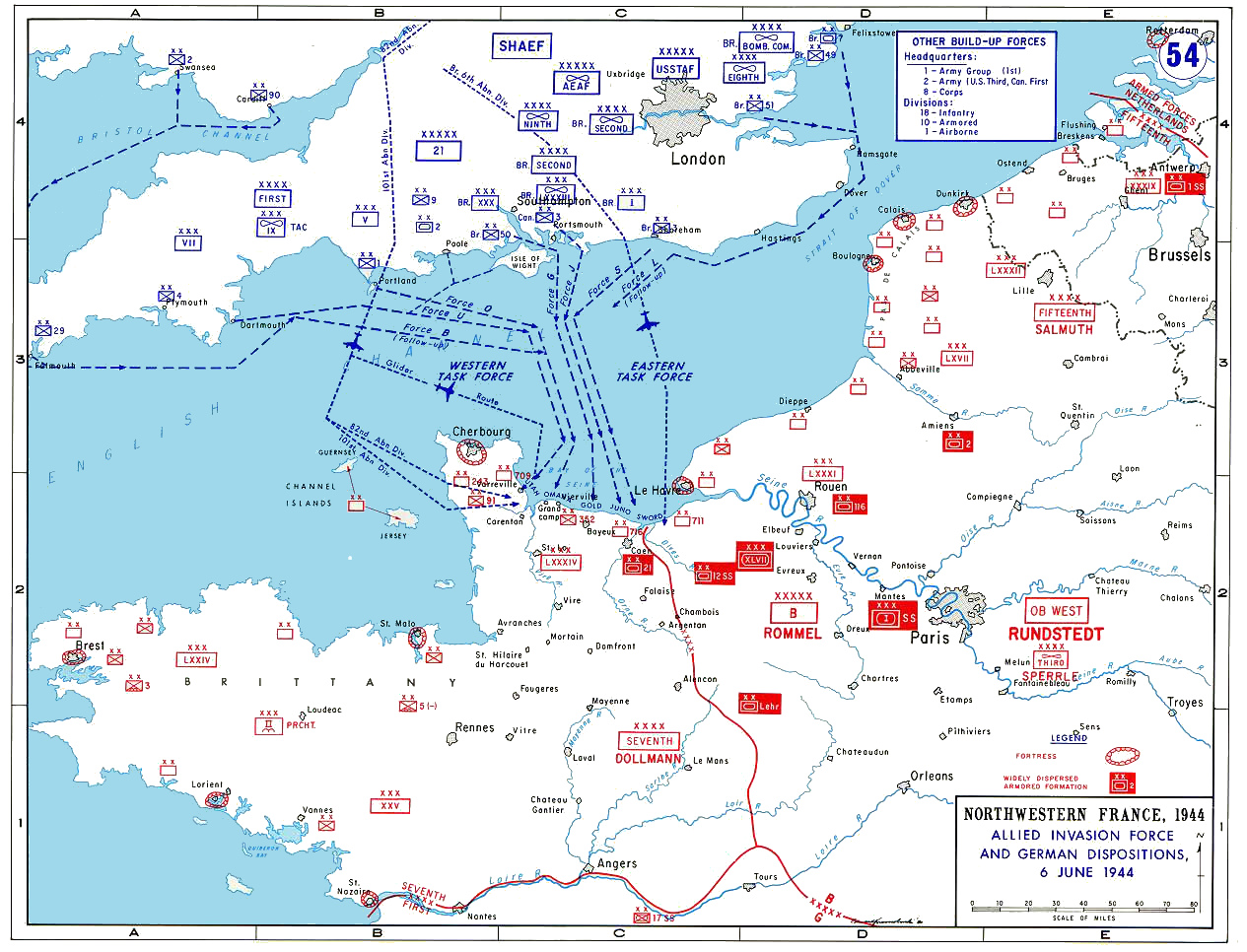
D-Day assault map of the Normandy region and the north-western coast of France. Utah and Omaha are separated by the Douve River, whose mouth is clear in the coastline notch (or "corner") of the map.

In 1942, the Western Allies agreed to open a second front (the Western Front) in Western Europe to take pressure off the beleaguered Red Army in the Soviet Union. While Britain and the United States did not yet possess the resources to mount a full invasion, invasion plans that came to be known as Operation Sledgehammer were drawn up, in case the German position in Western Europe weakened or the USSR's situation became dire. In August 1942 Anglo-Canadian forces attempted an abortive landing—Operation Jubilee—at the French port of Dieppe; the landing was designed to test the feasibility of a cross-channel invasion. The attack was poorly planned and ended in disaster; 4,963 soldiers were killed, wounded or captured. Following the Anglo-American victory against Field Marshal Erwin Rommel in North Africa in May 1943, British, American and Canadian troops invaded Sicily in July 1943, followed by Italy in September. By December the Allies' progress had slowed facing tenacious German resistance and the difficult geography of the Italian Peninsula.

After gaining valuable experience in amphibious assaults and inland fighting, Allied planners returned to the plans to invade Northern France, now postponed to 1944. Under the direction of General Dwight D. Eisenhower (Supreme Commander Allied Expeditionary Force) and Frederick Morgan, plans for the invasion of France coalesced as Operation Overlord. With an initial target date of 1 May 1944, the infantry attack was conceived as a joint assault by five divisions transported by landing craft, constituting the largest amphibious operation in military history. The attack was later scheduled for Monday, 6 June 1944, and Normandy was selected for the landing sites, with a zone of operations extending from the Cotentin Peninsula to Caen. There were originally seventeen sectors along the Normandy coastline with code names taken from one of the spelling alphabets of the time, from Able, west of Omaha, to Rodger on the east flank of the invasion area. Eight further sectors were added when the planned invasion was extended to include Utah on the Cotentin Peninsula. Sectors were further subdivided into beaches identified by the colours Green, Red and White. Operation Overlord called for the British Second Army to assault between the River Orne and Port-en-Bessin, capture Caen, and form a front line from Caumont-l'Éventé to the south-east of Caen, to acquire airfields and protect the left flank of the United States First Army while it captured Cherbourg. Possession of Caen and its surroundings would give Second Army a suitable staging area for a push south to capture the city of Falaise, which could then be used as a pivot for a swing left to advance on Argentan, the Touques River and then towards the River Seine.

After delays due to both logistical difficulties and poor weather, the D-Day of Overlord, the largest amphibious operation ever, was postponed 24 hours to 6 June 1944. Eisenhower and Montgomery, commander of the 21st Army Group, aimed to capture Caen within the first day, and liberate Paris within 90 days.

=== Juno ===
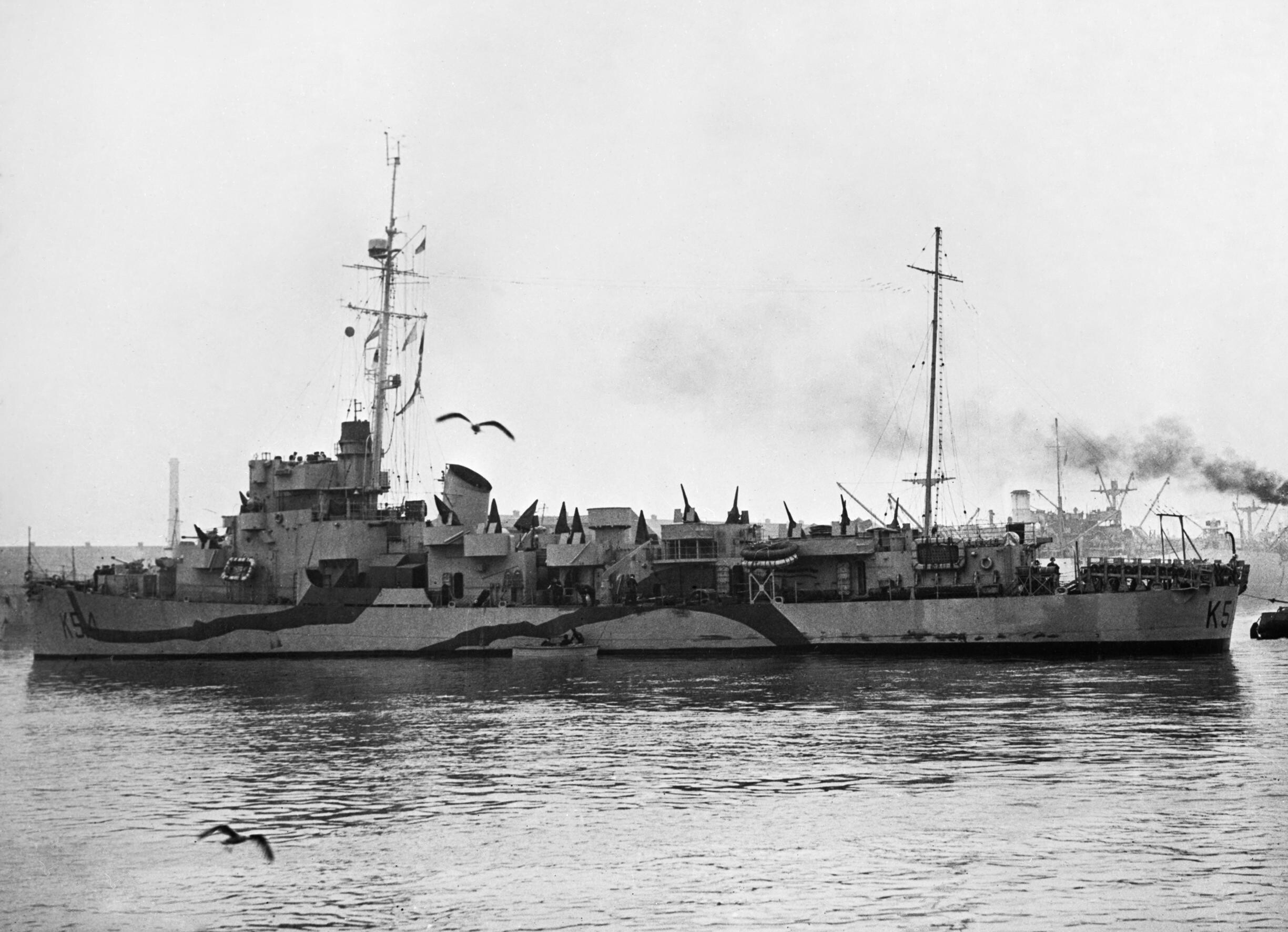
HMS Lawford, one of several Captain-class frigates converted to act as a headquarters ship for the Normandy landings, with extended superstructure (to accommodate the Staff Officers) and additional smaller mainmast to support the extra aerials. On 8 June 1944, whilst operating off Juno, she was hit by enemy fire during an air attack and sunk.

Operation Neptune, the landing phase of Overlord, called for a five-division front spread across 50 mi (80 km) of coastline; three airborne divisions (two American, one British, which also included a Canadian battalion) would also land in the pre-dawn hours of D-Day. Eisenhower and General Bernard Montgomery hoped to have eight infantry divisions and fourteen tank regiments in the Normandy beachhead by nightfall on D-Day. The landing zone was divided into five landing areas, with the Americans attacking Utah (the westernmost) and Omaha, and the British attacking Gold and Sword. Juno, a 6 mi (9.7 km) stretch of shoreline between La Rivière to the west and Saint-Aubin to the east, was assigned to the 3rd Canadian Infantry Division (3rd CID), commanded by Major-General Rod Keller. Juno included the villages of Courseulles and Bernières.

It has been said the name "Juno" arose because Winston Churchill considered that an original code name – Jelly – sounded inappropriate. The code names for the beaches to be taken by British and Commonwealth forces were named after types of fish: Goldfish, Swordfish and Jellyfish, abbreviated to Gold, Sword and Jelly. Churchill "disapproved of the name Jelly for a beach on which so many men might die". It has subsequently been proven that the name Jelly was never considered, and Juno was chosen so as to use the initial letter of the naval task force assigned to the area.

== Planning and preparation ==
=== German defences ===
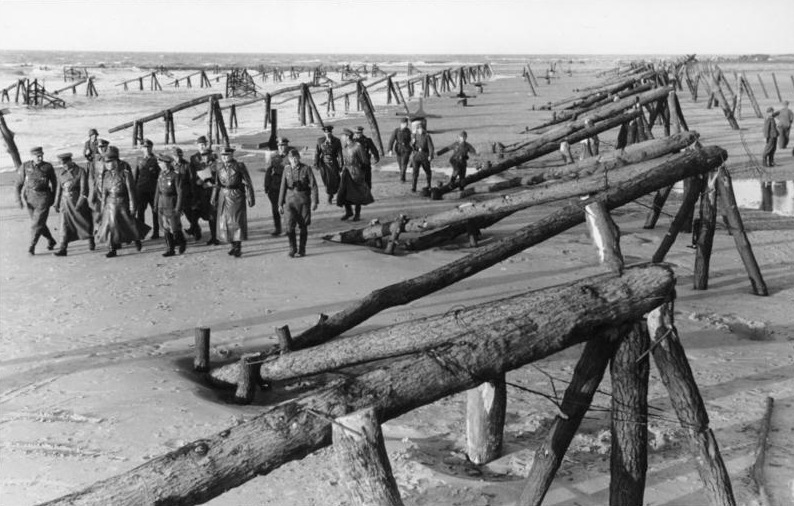
Field Marshal Erwin Rommel inspecting Atlantic Wall defences, April 1944

While the German army had seen its strength and morale heavily depleted by campaigns in the Soviet Union, North Africa and Italy, it remained a powerful fighting force. Despite this, most of the German divisions along the French coast in late 1943 were composed of either new recruits or veteran units resting and rebuilding from the Eastern Front; altogether some 856,000 soldiers were stationed in France, predominantly on the coast. An additional 60,000 Hilfswillige (voluntary helpers), USSR and Polish members of the German army, served on the French coast. Under the command of Field Marshals Erwin Rommel and Gerd von Rundstedt, the defences of the Atlantic Wall – a line of coastal gun emplacements, machine-gun nests, minefields and beach obstacles along the French coast – were increased; in the first six months of 1944, the Germans laid 1,200,000 long tons (1,200,000 t) of steel and 17,300,000 yd^{3} (13,200,000 m^{3}) of concrete. Rommel also surrounded the coast with four million anti-tank and anti-personnel mines and 500,000 beach obstacles.

On Juno, the defences of the Atlantic Wall were greater than at many other landing sectors. The Germans assumed that the Allies would land during high tide, to minimize the distance during which they would be exposed on the beaches and created "a 'devil's garden' of beach obstacles ... deployed in rows between 12 and 17 ft [3.7 and 5.2 m] above the low-tide mark". Strongpoints of machine-gun positions, antitank and anti-personnel artillery and bunkers were located every 1,000 yards (910 m), manned by several platoons with mortars. Minefields were deployed surrounding these strongpoints, and additional defences were present in the Courseulles harbour.

The Calvados beaches of Normandy were defended by the 716th Static and 352nd Infantry divisions, with the Canadian landing zone defended by elements of the 716th. It was formed mostly from soldiers under 18 or over 35, comprising 7,771 combat troops in six battalions (as opposed to 9 or 12 battalions of Allied divisions). While the 352nd was considered a first-rate division, the 716th was "accounted a better-than-average static division". These divisions generally had very few vehicles or tanks and had to rely on infantry and field regiments. On Juno the 736th Grenadier Regiment deployed four infantry companies, 7 Kompanie held what was to become "Mike Sector", the 6th was stationed in Courseulles, the 5th was at Bernières and the 9th held Nan sector and Saint-Aubin. A second line of four infantry companies and one panzer company was stationed 1 mi (1.6 km) inland. The 21st Panzer Division was deployed south-east of Caen and two battalions of Polish and Russian conscripts were stationed on the flanks of Juno adjacent to Sword and Gold.

=== Canadian preparations ===
Canadian training for D-Day had begun as early as July 1943, when Lieutenant-General Andrew McNaughton, the military representative of the Canadian government, informed Harry Crerar, commander of I Canadian Corps, that the 3rd Canadian Infantry Division might play a role in the invasion of France. Initial training was demanding, and complicated by the lack of any landing craft to practice with, either LCAs or LCTs. (Note: Landing craft were designated according to their size and function. "Landing Craft, Tank" (LCTs) were large boats designed to deploy armoured units to the beaches, while "Landing Craft, Assault" (LCAs) deployed infantry.) Field exercises in Scotland commenced in August and September 1943, and succeeded in establishing unique techniques and equipment for use by armoured and artillery regiments in storming the beach; the most significant were the amphibious "Duplex Drive" tanks (DD tanks). Mechanisms were also developed to allow artillery to bombard the beach while still aboard their landing craft. Through the winter of 1944, units jointly developed more advanced assault tactics among the Juno regiments.

The landings would be supported by the largest invasion fleet in history – 7,016 vessels in total. Naval Force J had begun intense training for the invasion with the 3rd Canadian Infantry Division in February 1944, with a full-scale simulation of the invasion carried out on 4 May in Exercise Fabius. On D-Day itself, Force J, commanded from HMS Hilary, was to bombard German defensive positions along the landing zone with everything from heavy-calibre cruiser guns to self-propelled artillery attached to landing craft. According to Canadian Army Historian C. P. Stacey, a light bombardment of the landing zone would commence "30 minutes before H Hour and continue for 15 minutes; heavy bombing would then begin on the flanks of the divisional attack, lasting until H Hour". Additional cover would be provided by Royal and Royal Canadian Air Force squadrons both before and on D-Day. A successful surprise invasion required total air superiority over the English Channel and Normandy. In the months preceding D-Day, the RAF Second Tactical Air Force attacked airfields, coastal garrisons, radar, railway lines and transport routes in order to soften the beach defences, as well as prevent the German Luftwaffe from mounting a serious challenge to air superiority over Normandy. By dawn, on 6 June, the RAF tactical air forces had 2,434 fighter and fighter-bomber aircraft with approximately 700 light and medium bombers to support them.

The operational plan for Juno was divided into two main sectors: Mike (west) and Nan (east). Mike Sector would be attacked by the 7th Canadian Infantry Brigade, with the Royal Winnipeg Rifles, The Canadian Scottish Regiment and the 1st Hussars in support. The 7th Brigade was to take Courseulles and drive inland. Nan Sector would be assaulted by the Regina Rifle Regiment of 7th Brigade, as well as the North Shore Regiment and the Queen's Own Rifles of Canada of the 8th Canadian Infantry Brigade, while tanks of the Fort Garry Horse provided armoured support; a squadron of specialized Armoured Vehicle Royal Engineers (AVRE) from the British 79th Armoured Division would land on each beach sector as well. The 8th Brigade was to capture Bernières and the western edge of Saint-Aubin, then push south into Normandy. The operational plan also called for the 9th Canadian Infantry Brigade and the Sherbrooke Fusiliers to be deployed to Juno as reinforcements within 4 to 6 hours of the initial assault. By nightfall of D-Day, the 3rd Canadian Infantry Division was slated to have captured the high ground west of Caen, the Bayeux–Caen railway line, and the seaside towns of Courseulles, Bernières, Saint-Aubin and Bény-sur-Mer.

== D-Day landings ==
=== Early bombardment ===
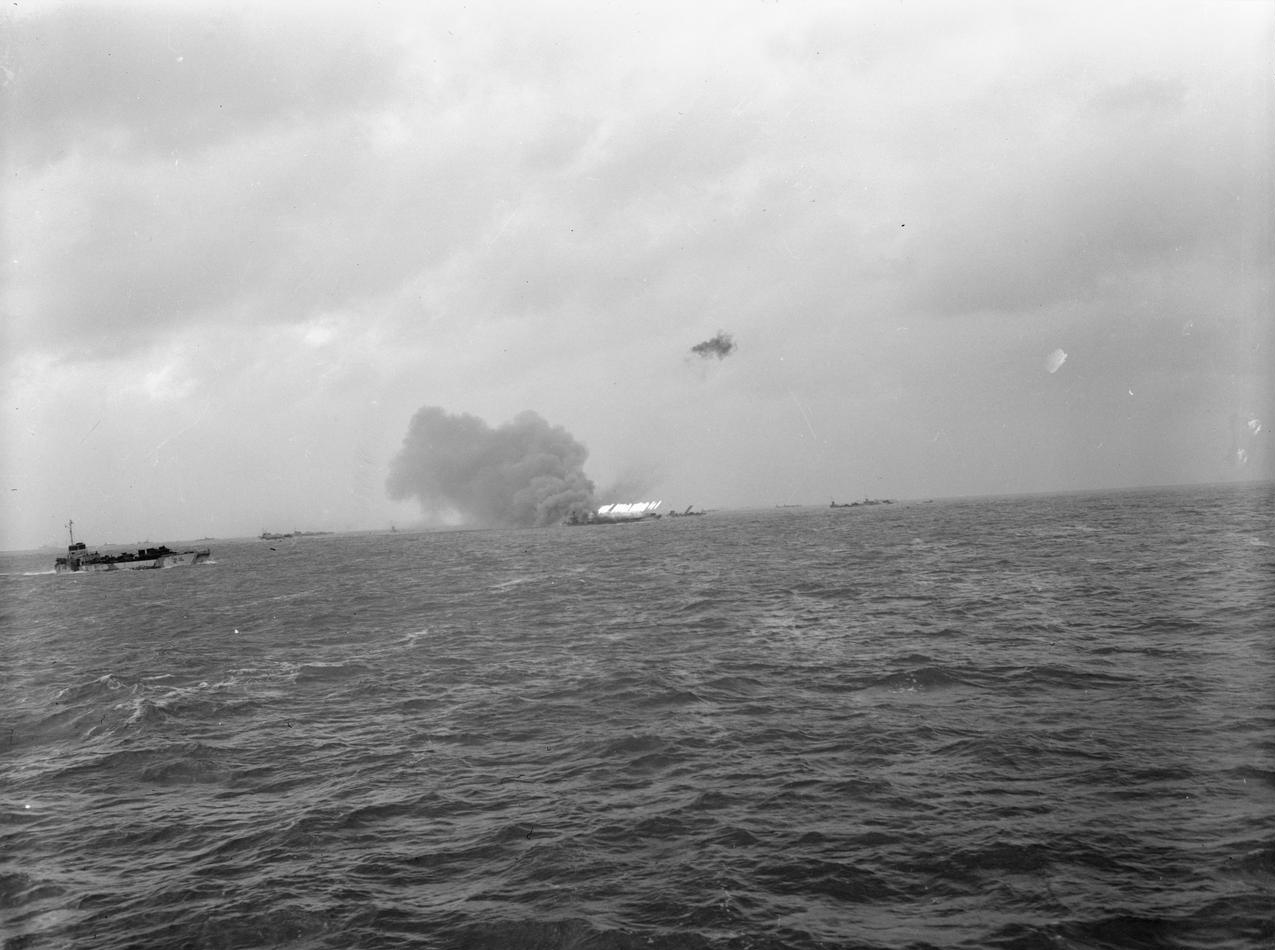
A Landing Craft Tank (Rocket) fires on Juno assault area, 6 June 1944.

Air attacks on Normandy's coastal defences began in earnest on 5 June at 23:30, with RAF Bomber Command units targeting the primary coastal defences. The attack continued until 05:15, with 5,268 long tons (5,353 t) of bombs dropped by 1,136 sorties; this marked the largest attack by Bomber Command in terms of tonnage up to that point in the war. Initial attacks on the Atlantic Wall proved ineffective, with poor weather and visibility making it difficult to accurately hit the bunkers and turrets. (Note: For example, the battery at Merville was not hit, the bombing of the Longues battery was accurate yet ineffective and the Houlgate battery was damaged but not destroyed.) The bombing left the defences on Omaha, Gold and Juno virtually intact, yet did not damage Allied landing craft in the Channel (as many planners had feared it would).

As the Americans began their own bombing runs against Omaha and Utah to the west, the naval forces began their counter-battery fire, seeking to knock out German shore batteries and bunkers. The British had attached the cruisers HMS Belfast and Diadem to Force J to serve as heavy support. Belfast commenced bombardment of the Atlantic Wall in the neighbouring Gold area at 05:30 and Diadem at 05:52 on 6 June. The naval gunfire proved more effective than the aerial bombardment; the battery at Longues was the only one to return fire, and was quickly neutralised by the light cruiser HMS Ajax. Indeed, most of the gun batteries at Juno were incomplete on D-Day, and did not possess sufficient protection or communication measures to accurately return fire on Force J. The Bény-sur-Mer battery was neutralized by Diadem shortly after she opened fire.

At 06:10, the 11 destroyers of Force J moved shoreward to begin bombardment, hoping to damage light gun emplacements and prevent the German 716th from mobilizing and moving across the beach. They were supplemented by additional raids by medium bombers and fighter-bombers of the RAF and USAAF, which dropped an additional 2,796 tons of ordnance on the five landing zones. While the medium bombers proved inaccurate, the Hawker Typhoon fighter-bombers proved more effective at attacking coastal defences. As the bombing runs continued to hit Juno, the destroyers and landing craft moved towards the beach and began close-range saturation bombardment. In addition to the destroyers of Force J—eight British, two Canadian, one French and one Norwegian—bombardment was also provided by converted LCTs fitted with 4.7 in (120 mm) guns. Smaller, light-gunned landing craft were able to get closer to the beach and use their 6-pounder guns against German defensive positions. Additional firepower was provided by eight landing craft fitted with over 1,000 high-explosive rockets and 24 LCTs, each carrying four M7 Priest self-propelled guns. These field regiments, while still seaborne, were to fire heavy concentrations of high explosive and smoke shells against the four main "resistance nests" in "Mike" and "Nan" sectors, beginning half an hour before H Hour. Forward observation and fire control officers in the leading assault waves were to make the necessary adjustments to this neutralizing fire during the assault.

The bombardment was scheduled to cease immediately before the assault companies deployed on Juno, but due to heavy seas, the landing was delayed by ten minutes, to 07:45 in Mike sector and 07:55 in Nan Sector. This was at a slightly higher tide, closer to the beach obstacles and mines. The LCTs carrying the field artillery were forced to adjust course to avoid landing too early; the LCTs carrying DD tanks were forced to break off their advance. (Note: The DD tanks were M4 Sherman medium tanks fitted with screens and a propeller, which allowed them to float and propel themselves through the water. On D-Day, they were scheduled to deploy seven thousand yards offshore, and land before the LCAs to provide infantry cover.) The seas proved too rough to launch the DD tanks, so they were ordered to deploy from the LCTs several hundred yards out from the beach.

=== Landing: 7th Brigade (Mike, Nan Green) ===
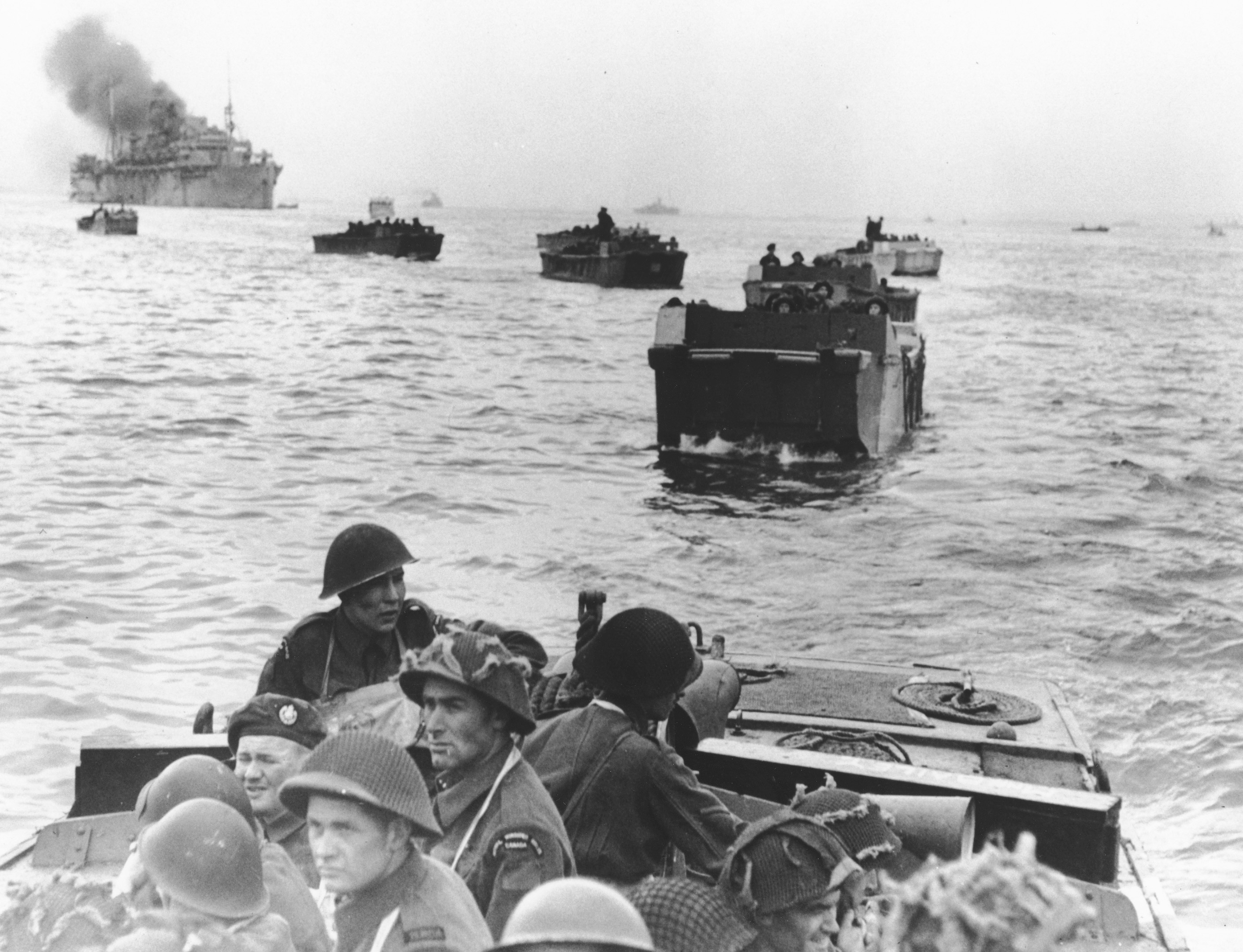
The Royal Winnipeg Rifles heading towards Juno aboard LCAs

Though the 7th Canadian Infantry Brigade was scheduled to land on Mike Sector at 07:35, rough seas and poor craft co-ordination pushed this time back by ten minutes. Two assault companies of the Royal Winnipeg Rifles, one assault company of the Canadian Scottish Regiment, and one squadron of the 1st Hussars were to land on "Mike Red" and also on "Mike Green", while the Regina Rifle Regiment, supported by a second squadron of the 1st Hussars, landed on "Nan Green" sector. The first Winnipegs touched down at 07:49, with the remaining assault companies deploying within seven minutes. The LCAs carrying "B" Company craft were engaged while about 700 yards from shore. Disembarkation had to be done under direct fire and, in consequence, heavy casualties were sustained by this company while landing. The strongpoint in this area consisted of three casemates and twelve machine-gun emplacements. This left the infantry the grim prospect of clearing it by direct assault. "B" Company was unable to advance further without armoured support. The Hussars' "A" Squadron launched 1,500 yd (1.4 km) from the beach, but was not fully deployed until a full six minutes after the Winnipegs were ashore. To their west, "D" Company faced less defensive fire, as it was clear of the strongpoint. The company easily cleared the beach and went through the barbed wire with light casualties. "A" Platoon of the 6th Field Company Royal Canadian Engineers was redirected to clear the minefields facing "D" Company, given that the flail tanks had yet to land. On the far right, "C" Company of the Canadian Scottish Regiment landed with little opposition, and discovered that their objective—a 75 mm gun emplacement—had been destroyed by naval gunfire.

To the east of Mike Sector, the Regina Rifles came ashore on "Nan Green" with the objective of subduing German forces in Courseulles. "A" Company reported touchdown at 08:09 and met heavy resistance almost immediately; "B" Company reported touchdown at 08:15. The Hussars' tanks first reported deploying twenty minutes before the infantry, with "B" Squadron HQ reporting their landing at 07:58. They faced the task of destroying a heavy gun emplacement equipped with 88 mm and 75 mm guns and 4-foot-thick (1.2 m) concrete walls. The bombardment had failed to destroy the emplacement, and heavy machine guns inflicted many casualties on the company; one LCA reported six men killed within seconds of lowering the ramps. A platoon was able to breach the barbed wire lining the beach and take cover in Courseulles and then eliminate the machine-guns engaging "A" Company of the Regina Rifles. The DD tanks arrived in the Regina Rifles' sector with greater numbers and punctuality than in the Winnipegs' sector. The 75 mm gun emplacement in the Courseulles strongpoint was destroyed by fire from "B" Squadron of the 1st Hussars; the 88 mm was similarly silenced. To their east, "B" Company encountered limited resistance, pushed into Courseulles and soon "had cleared a succession of the assigned blocks in the village".

With the initial assault companies ashore and fighting for their objectives, the reserve companies and battalion (Canadian Scottish Regiment) began their deployment on Juno. "A" and "C" Companies of the Winnipeg Rifles landed at 08:05 and began to push towards the villages of Banville and Sainte-Croix-sur-Mer. "A" Company encountered heavy machine gun fire and had to request support from the 1st Hussars to clear the position. On Nan Green, "C" and "D" Companies of the Regina Rifles prepared to storm Courseulles. "C" Company touched down at 08:35 and moved into the village without difficulty. "D" Company was further delayed, after several LCAs struck antitank mines attached to beach obstacles; only 49 "D" Company soldiers reached the beach. The Canadian Scottish Regiment arrived on the beach at 08:30, with the leading companies coming under heavy mortar fire; it took the battalion a full hour to get off the beaches and push further inland.

=== Landing: 8th Brigade (Nan White, Red) ===
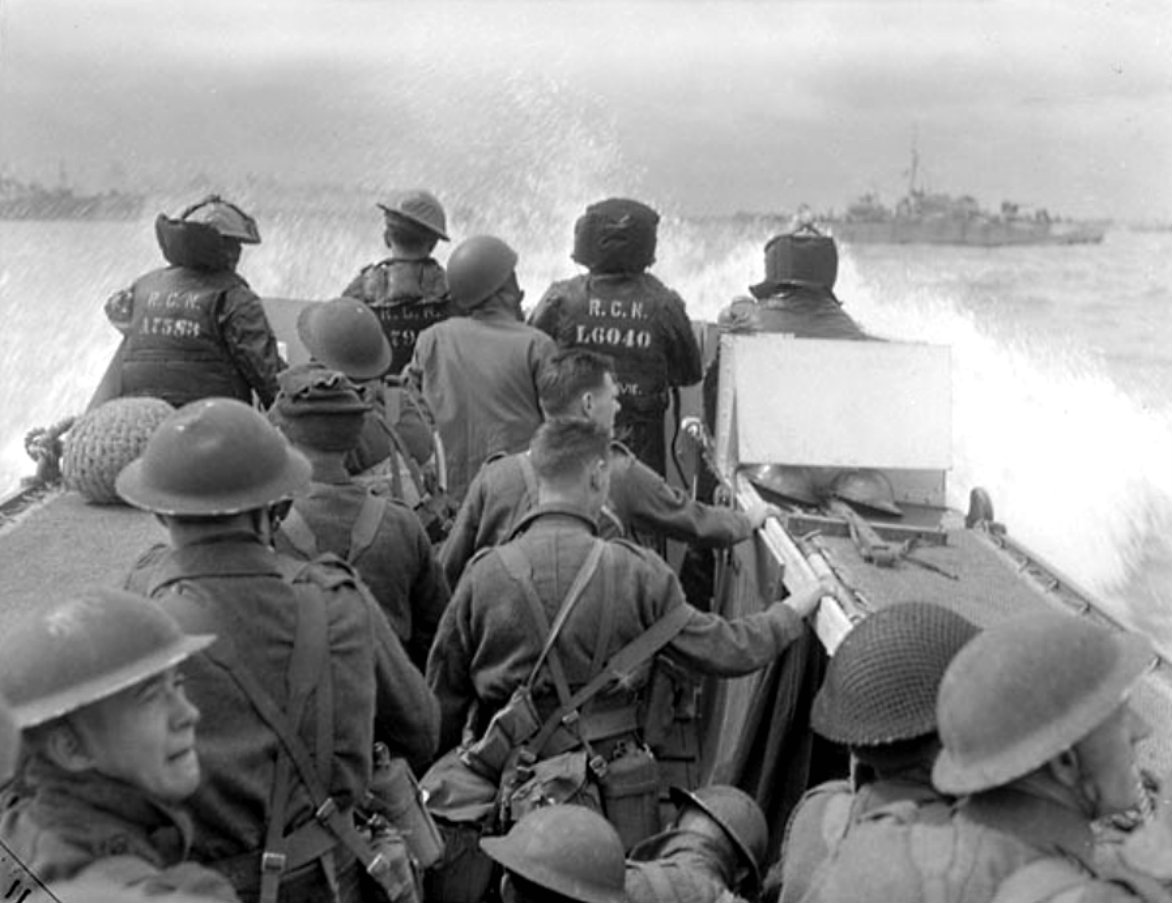
Canadian troops moving towards Juno

Originally scheduled to land at 07:45 to the east of the 7th, the 8th Canadian Infantry Brigade's two assault battalions were postponed by 10 minutes as a result of heavy seas. The Queen's Own Rifles of Canada (QOR) landed at 08:12 at Nan White and faced the most tenacious defences of any unit in Nan Sector: an 88 mm gun emplacement with multiple machine-gun nests outside of Bernières. The first LCA to touch down saw 10 of its first 11 soldiers either killed or wounded. "B" Company came ashore directly in front of the main resistance nests, 200 yards east of their intended landing zone, subjecting them to heavy mortar and machine-gun fire. The QOR had been scheduled to advance with DD fire support, but the heavy seas meant that "instead of swimming in, they [DD tanks] left their craft close inshore and landed behind the infantry assault companies". Several soldiers from "B" Company succeeded in outflanking the main pillbox and killing its gunners with grenades and small arms. One LCA's rudder from "B" Company had jammed and that platoon landed far to the left of the rest of "B" Company, enabling them to outflank and destroy the gun emplacements. With the defences silenced, the QOR was able to advance into Bernières, having suffered 65 casualties on the beaches. To their west, "A" Company encountered less resistance but was limited by poorly coordinated run-ins by the LCAs to the beach. "A" Company was able to quickly reach the seawall and breach the barbed wire but encountered much mortar and sniper fire in Bernières. This was the only sector of Juno where armoured support proved ineffective, as "B" Squadron of the Fort Garry Horse was too far out from the beach to provide heavy support.

The first units of the North Shore Regiment's "A" and "B" companies touched down on Nan Red at 08:10 in chest-deep water. They were tasked with securing Saint-Aubin and clearing defences in the village. "B" Company landed to find that the Saint-Aubin strong point "appeared not to have been touched" by preliminary naval bombardment. The two assault companies faced a 100 yd (91 m) sprint across open beach in the face of fire from Saint-Aubin. "A" Company suffered the most casualties, incurring many fatalities from beach mines. "B" Company faced stronger opposition at the strong point, yet managed to breach the seawall and barbed wire. The 50 mm antitank gun was still firing and the thick concrete casemates protected it from infantry fire. By 08:10, Sherman tanks of the Fort Garry Horse and AVRE of the 80th Assault Squadron, Royal Engineers, had landed at Nan Red and begun to assist "B" Company in clearing the gun emplacement. The 50 mm gun knocked out four of the squadron's tanks, while the North Shore's machine-gun platoon was flanking the position. The right section of the strong point was eliminated by anti-tank guns and engineers, while the central anti-tank gun was silenced by 230 mm Petard demolition bombs fired from the AVRE. When the North Shore captured the strong point, approximately half the defenders were killed; 48 German soldiers surrendered.

The 8th Brigade reserve battalion, Le Régiment de la Chaudière, began deploying to the beaches at 08:30 along with the reserve companies of the North Shore and QOR. More than half of the LCAs were crippled by mines buried along the beach; QOR "C" Company was forced to touch down further offshore when their LCAs were damaged by mines. "C" Company linked up with "B" Squadron of the Fort Garry Horse, and moved to assist the pinned-down and exhausted "A" Company. The North Shore C and D Companies landed outside of Saint-Aubin, with "C" Company taking over for "A" Company in the advance further into Saint-Aubin, while "D" Company occupied the village. All but one of the LCAs carrying Chaudière "A" Company foundered before they could touch down on the beach, and they lost most of their equipment while swimming to shore. The Chaudières quickly formed up outside Bernières and Saint-Aubin, linking up with both the QOR and the North Shores. The reserve also included the No. 48 (Royal Marine) Commando, which was scheduled to land 45 minutes after the first arrivals. The Commandos were to pass Saint-Aubin's eastern edge and occupy Langrune-sur-Mer on the eastern end of Juno. The strong point facing them had not been cleared and 120 of the 400-man unit became casualties within seconds of landing.

=== Deploying reinforcements ===
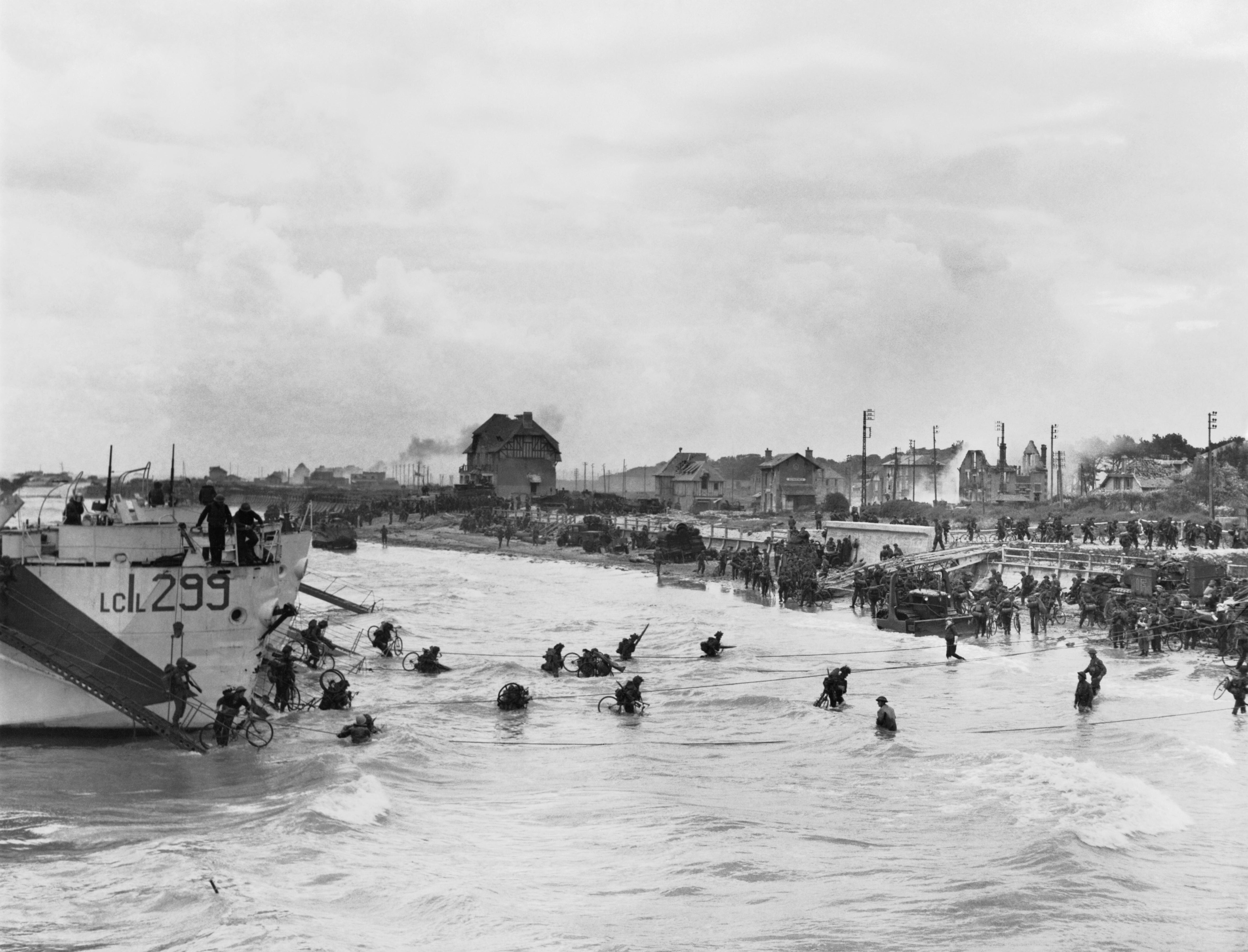
Soldiers of the 9th Canadian Infantry Brigade deploying in Nan White Sector. Note that "Canada House" is visible as the large intact house in the background.

With Juno largely secured, Keller prepared to deploy the reserves of the 9th Canadian Infantry Brigade and tanks of the Sherbrooke Fusiliers. The reports coming in from the battalions already on Juno were mixed; Canadian military historian Terry Copp says that the North Shore was "proceeding according to plan", while the Chaudières were "making progress slowly". The two self-propelled artillery regiments—the 14th Field and 19th Army Field Regiments, Royal Canadian Artillery—had deployed at 09:25 and 09:10, and had several dozen guns in action before 11:00. Opposition and continued problems with mine obstacles on Nan Red meant that the entire 9th Brigade would have to land in Bernières and Nan White sector. When the 9th Brigade's LCIs touched down at 11:40, the congestion on the beach in Nan White was so heavy that most infantry companies could not disembark from their landing craft. The 9th Brigade's reserves consisted of the Cameron Highlanders of Ottawa, the North Nova Scotia Highlanders, the Stormont, Dundas and Glengarry Highlanders, and the Highland Light Infantry of Canada. The Glengarry Highlanders reported coming under mortar fire from German positions further inland, as "with little room to manoeuvre on dry land, the entire 9th Brigade became easy targets for German artillery". The 9th Brigade quickly made it across the beach, and joined the Chaudières, Queen's Own Rifles and Fort Garry Horse in Bernières to await further advance inland.

Having subdued German defences on the beach, the next task of the landed forces was to clear Juno of obstacles, debris and undetonated mines then establish the 3rd Canadian Infantry Division's headquarters in Bernières. Movement Control Units came ashore just before noon, with military policemen beginning to marshal vehicles through to Bernières and Courseulles. Sappers of the 619 Independent Field Company also moved in to begin clearing the minefields surrounding the beach, so as to free up the advance south towards Carpiquet. Keller himself established divisional headquarters in Bernières shortly after noon.

== Advance inland ==
=== Initial attacks ===
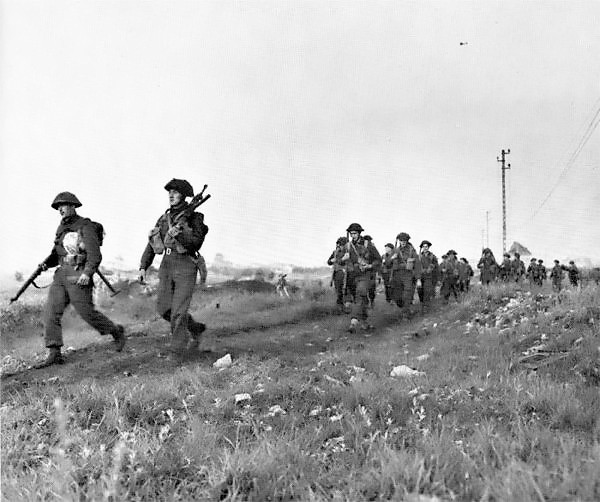
The Royal Winnipeg Rifles advance inland on D-Day.

At 14:35, Keller met with the commanders of the 8th and 9th Infantry Brigades, as well as the newly reconstituted 2nd Armoured Brigade (Fort Garry Horse, Sherbrooke Fusiliers, 1st Hussars). With the first line of objectives (codenamed Yew) secured on the beachhead, Keller ordered the 7th and 8th Brigades to advance with armoured support towards the second line of objectives (Elm), whereupon 9th Brigade would then leapfrog over the 7th and 8th to reach the third objective line (Oak). Facing them were the remains of three battalions of the 736th Grenadier Regiment, and three battalions of the 726th Regiment. "B" Company of the Winnipegs was still facing heavy resistance from snipers and machine guns in Courseulles, while the eastern companies of the North Shore Regiment were fighting for Saint-Aubin. "A" and "C" Companies of the Royal Winnipegs moved off the beach, cut through the walls of barbed wire behind the German bunkers, pushed through Vaux and Graye-sur-Mer, and began to advance towards St. Croix and Banville. "C" Company advanced on Banville—the headquarters of II Battalion of the 726th—but was stopped by three machine-gun emplacements just short of the town. Winnipeg "A" Company joined "C" Company of the Canadian Scottish Regiment and a troop of "C" Squadron of the 1st Hussars and advanced on St. Croix, unaware of a large German counter-attack massing in St. Croix under the command of 8 Battalion, 726 Regiment. "C" Company of the Canadian Scottish Regiment had deployed to their west, and was able to spot the units of the 8th Battalion, and halt the counter-attack before it fully materialized. "D" Company of the Winnipegs joined the advance on Banville with covering fire from the Cameron Highlanders and the 12th and 13th Field Artillery Regiments; Banville was declared captured at 13:10, although small pockets of resistance would survive until nightfall and then retreat. "D" Company of the Canadian Scottish moved to capture two bridges on the Seulles River further inland from the Winnipeg companies. "B" Company joined them, and pushed through the gap between St. Croix and Banville, joining "C" Company as it did so. "C" Squadron of the 1st Hussars provided armoured support. To their east, the Regina Rifles advanced south towards Reviers, engaging troops of the 7th Battalion of the 736th Grenadier Regiment. They reported reaching the town by 12:15 with two companies, and began consolidating their position in preparation for further advance.

In Nan Sector, the 8th Brigade advance started slower than that of the 7th Brigade, because the Chaudières had lost most of their equipment on the advance over the beaches. (Note: The landing craft of the 8th Brigade's reserve had foundered against mines and obstacles much farther off the beach than other battalions, forcing the Chaudières to discard much of their equipment in order to swim to safety.) The Queen's Own Rifles' "C" Company was pinned down at the edge of Bernières by sniper-fire, and could not cross the open fields behind the town; their armoured support was also stopped by heavy antitank fire coming from Beny-sur-Mer. The Chaudières "A" and "B" Companies were caught in the crossfire; "B" Company lost almost an entire platoon when a German 88 mm scored a hit on a Priest self-propelled gun. Chaudière and QOR progress was slow; all told, it took nearly two hours for artillery and heavy guns to clear the defences at Beny-sur-Mer, allowing the QOR to advance towards the town. Beny-sur-Mer was reported cleared at 14:00, at which point the Chaudières began to mass in the town for a further advance south towards Carpiquet. The QOR broke off to the left to engage heavy artillery batteries to the west of Beny, and "B" Company was assisted by the guns of HMCS Algonquin, which destroyed a bunker of 105 mm guns. To their east, "C" and "D" Company of the North Shores advanced towards Tailleville—the headquarters of II Battalion of the 736th Grenadiers. Mortar fire north of the headquarters was both concentrated and accurate, slowing the advance of "C" Company. They were supported in their drive south by tanks of the Fort Garry Horse, which caught close to 100 German defenders in open fields. The North Shores and their armour support entered Tailleville at 14:00, at which point the six tanks of "C" Squadron moved through the village, destroying German gun emplacements. The defenders of the II Battalion had created a complex underground bunker system in the village, which enabled them to continuously outflank Canadian infantry; it took another seven hours to clear Tailleville of defenders, which ensured that the North Shores would be unable to capture German radar sites to the south on D-Day.

"B" Company of the North Shore Regiment and No. 48 Commando of the Royal Marines were engaged in a protracted fight to secure Saint-Aubin and Lagrune-sur-Mer. "B" Company had generally neutralized the strongpoint WN27 within two hours of landing, which allowed Troops A and B of the Royal Marines to push east. These units had the important objective of bridging the 5 mi (8.0 km) gap between the landing zones at Juno and Sword, which would allow for a continuous Anglo-Canadian front by the end of the first day. The Royal Marines began to advance on Lagrune and strong-point WN26, while to their east No. 41 Commando Royal Marines advanced from Sword. The strongpoint was defended by "a reinforced platoon from the 736th Grenadiers" and was a group of fortified houses and 50 mm anti-tank guns. B Troop's first attempt to capture it failed and the assault was renewed with support from Centaur tanks only to again falter in the face of heavy resistance. No. 48 Commando was forced to call the assault off at nightfall, as reports of massing for counter-attacks by the 21st Panzer Division against the divide between Sword and Juno arrived. The strong points at Lagrune and Luc-sur-Mer were captured on 8 June.

=== Drive to Elm ===
Canadian advances on D-Day

The division's advance south of Tailleville had halted, preventing an attack on German radar stations. The Queen's Own Rifles and "C" Company of the Chaudières opted to continue their advance towards Anguerny and Columby-sur-Thaon and Objective Line "Elm". The beachhead was now filled to capacity with troops, to the point that "B" Company of the Chaudières could not be deployed alongside "C" Company without severely hindering the advance of the QOR to their east. "C" Company's advance on Basly was even further hindered by the proximity of the combat; the fighting occurred at such close range that the 14th Field Artillery would not provide fire support for fear of friendly-fire casualties.

When "C" Company reached Basly, the North Nova Scotia Highlanders formed up outside Beny-sur-Mer, with the intention of overtaking the Chaudières and making for Carpiquet and the Caen–Bayeux highway. At 16:45, the North Novas assembled in Beny, and were the target of concentrated German mortar fire as the Sherbrooke Fusiliers de-waterproofed their tanks. Three companies of the North Novas and a squadron of the Sherbrookes advanced on the mortar positions, with many casualties among the infantry but clearing the positions. The QOR entered Anguerny—on the Elm Objective Line—at 17:30, and sent "D" Company to probe German defences on the hills overlooking the village.

The Chaudières reported that Basly was cleared of defenders at 18:15, allowing the 9th Brigade to advance towards Carpiquet Airfield. By 19:00, the North Nova Scotia Highlanders were advancing towards Carpiquet, encountering their first resistance an hour later. With reports of the 21st Panzer Division attacking the flanks of the British 3rd Infantry Division on Sword, Lieutenant-General Miles Dempsey—commander of the British Second Army—ordered forces on Sword, Juno and Gold to establish defensive positions at their intermediate objectives.

On the western edge of the Canadian sector, the advance of the 7th Brigade had stalled in the face of stiffening resistance in St. Croix and Banville, delaying the right flank of the assault. The German defenders gave ground slowly and did not begin withdrawing from the towns until the Bren Gun platoons began to arrive at 14:00. Once St. Croix and Banville were cleared, the Canadian Scots pushed south to Colombiers, reinforced the platoons that had captured the bridge across the Seulles earlier in the day, and moved towards the Creully–Caen road. The Canadian Scots reported reaching the road at 16:30, and continued to push south past Objective Line Elm. To their west the Royal Winnipegs stopped at Elm Line, and began to erect defensive positions with Bren Gun carriers and artillery. The Regina Rifles had been slow to advance from Courseulles on account of the heavy casualties taken securing the village; the 1st Hussars' "B" Squadron was in a similar position, with only half its fighting strength having made it off the beach. By 18:00 the Reginas were advancing, while the Hussars scouted ahead of the infantry companies. As the Reginas linked up with the Canadian Scots, the order to hold positions and dig in arrived from Keller's headquarters; the two battalions halted at 21:00.

Three tanks of the 1st Hussars' "C" Squadron (No. 2 Troop) had continued to advance southwards, pushing through side-roads towards Carpiquet Airfield. Aside from a German staff-car and a machine-gun nest, the three Sherman tanks encountered virtually no resistance, advancing all the way to the Caen–Bayeux railway line and becoming the only unit of the division to reach the Canadian front line objective on D-Day. The commander of the unit, Lieutenant William F. McCormick, attempted to contact his superiors to bring up reinforcements to attack Carpiquet Airfield, the three tanks eventually withdrew to the Canadian Elm line at Camilly.

=== Positions at nightfall ===
At the end of D-Day, the 3rd Canadian Infantry Division was situated firmly on Objective Line Elm, approximately half way to their final D-Day objectives on Line Oak. In 7 Brigade's sector to the west, the Winnipeg Rifles had secured the town of Cruelly and the Regina Rifles were dug in at Camilly, with the Canadian Scottish between them. On the east flank the North Nova Scotia highlanders and Queen's Own Rifles of Canada had secured Villons-les-Buissons and Anisy respectively, but there had not been a link up with the British 3rd Division.

The German 716th Infantry Division was scattered and practically wiped out. The German 21st Panzer Division had driven a temporary wedge between the British and Canadian 3rd Divisions, but had been unable to cause any real damage. To the south, Hitler had released the elite Panzer Lehr Division and the 12th SS Panzer Division Hitlerjugend (Hitler Youth), both of which prepared to head north with the I SS Panzer Corps.

The 9th Brigade was positioned a mere 3 mi (4.8 km) from Caen, the farthest inland of any Allied units on D-Day. On the eastern edge of the Canadian sector the 8th Brigade had taken up positions in Anguerny and Columby, having begun in the late afternoon to dig in. The 3rd Canadian Infantry Division had succeeded in advancing farther than any other divisional element in the Allied Expeditionary Force, but due to heavy fighting in Lagrune and Saint-Aubin had failed to link up with the British 3rd Division from Sword.

== Aftermath ==
=== Analysis ===
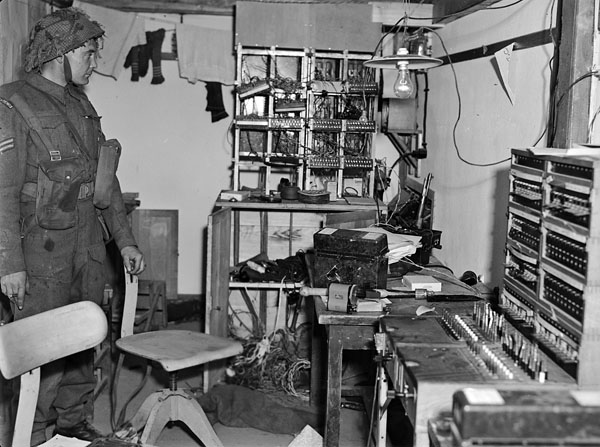
Corporal W. Nichorster of the Royal Canadian Corps of Signals examines the telephone switchboard in the underground bunker of a German radar station at Beny-sur-Mer. Although the site was originally intended to be taken on D-Day, a series of problems delayed its capture until 11 June.

While the Normandy landings in all five sectors managed to establish footholds in Normandy, many D-Day objectives were not met. To the west of Juno, the British 50th (Northumbrian) Infantry Division encountered only light resistance, and succeeded in advancing inland and creating a continuous front with Juno (though not with Omaha) with only 413 casualties. To their east, the British 3rd Infantry Division established a foothold on Sword. Counter-attacks by the 21st Panzer Division in the afternoon prevented the 3rd Infantry Division from capturing Caen and from making contact with the 3rd Canadian Infantry division on Juno. The counter-attack failed to drive the British into the sea.

In spite of the many casualties inflicted on the 352nd and 716th Infantry divisions, the 7th Army quickly established plans for counter-attacks. Early orders to move towards the invasion beaches were confused, as the divisions necessary for counter-attacks fell under a different jurisdiction than those defending the coast. The panzer divisions, such as the Panzer Lehr, 12th SS Panzer and 2nd SS Panzer, could not be mobilized for the coast without authorization by Hitler. The order to mobilize Panzer Lehr and the 12th SS was finally given in the mid-afternoon of 6 June. When the 9th Canadian Infantry Brigade and the Sherbrooke Fusiliers began to advance on 7 June, they were met by dug in troops of the 716th Infantry and 21st Panzer divisions. At 17:00, the advancing force was counter-attacked by the 12th SS, under the command of Kurt Meyer. The 9th Brigade was forced to withdraw to its D-Day positions, having suffered more casualties than any unit on Juno the previous day. The 7th Brigade reached its final D-Day objectives along Line Oak, while the 8th Brigade attempted to destroy German radar stations to their east, which took until 11 June.

The 3rd Canadian Infantry Division made contact with the British from Sword on 7 June, before forming a continuous front with the American sector by 13 June. The subsequent advance on Caen and Cherbourg was slow, as a greater number of German Panzer units were concentrated near Caen and Carentan. The Canadians captured Carpiquet Airfield during Operation Windsor on 5 July, while Anglo-Canadian forces captured Caen as part of Operation Charnwood (8–9 July) and Operation Atlantic (18–20 July).

=== Preliminary bombardment ===
Military historians have generally drawn the conclusion that the preliminary aerial and naval bombardment of Juno was not as effective as had been hoped, yet differ in their opinions as to how ineffective. The aerial bombardment of Juno's defences the night before is considered to have been very ineffective, primarily because of the inclement weather. John Keegan notes that "the prevailing low, thick cloud frustrated its [Bomber Command's] efforts". Colonel Stacey—the official historian of the Canadian Army in the Second World War—considers the effects of the bombing runs to have been "spotty", noting that while several coastal batteries were not hit, those that were (such as the battery at Houlgate) were hit accurately. Chester Wilmot offers a different view, suggesting that "[the coastal guns] had been accurately bombed, but had survived because they were heavily protected by the concrete casemates Rommel had insisted upon". Historians' assessment of the naval bombardment is even more mixed; while they generally agree that it failed to fully neutralize German defences on Juno, they are in disagreement as to why. Stacey suggests that while the "beach-drenching fire" was concentrated and substantial, it was both inaccurate and of insufficient firepower to destroy the coastal bunkers. He further suggests that the effect of the drenching fire was moral rather than material, in that it forced defenders to keep below-ground and sapped their morale. Terry Copp echoes this analysis, noting that "reasonable accuracy could not be obtained from the pitching decks of LCTs [by mounted artillery on the ships]"; the 13th Field Regiment's drenching fire fell on average 200 yards (180 m) past their targets. British historian Max Hastings notes that because of the delay in landing times by ten minutes, a substantial gap existed between the cessation of bombardment and the actual landing of the first waves of infantry, meaning that platoons of the 716th had ample time to return to their positions. The bombardment of strongpoints in the towns along the coast was inconsistent; the North Shore Regiment reported that the strongpoint near Saint-Aubin "appeared not to have been touched" by bombardment, while the strongpoints facing the Canadian Scottish Regiment had been eliminated by naval bombardment before their landing.

=== Overall ===
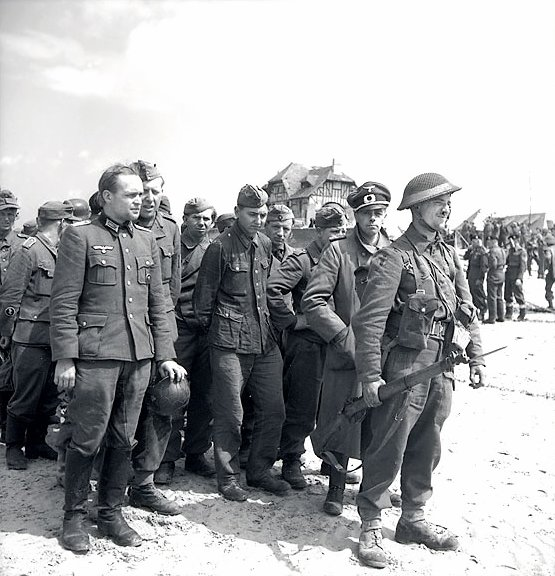
Allied soldiers guarding German prisoners on Juno

Despite the failure to capture any of the final D-Day objectives, the assault on Juno is considered by some—alongside Utah—the most strategically successful of the D-Day landings. Historians suggest a variety of reasons for this success. Mark Zuehlke notes that "the Canadians ended the day ahead of either the US or British divisions despite the facts that they landed last (a delay of half an hour due to bad weather) and that only the Americans at Omaha faced more difficulty winning a toehold on the sand". Chester Wilmot claims that the Canadian success in clearing the landing zones is attributable to the presence of amphibious DD tanks on the beaches; The DD Tanks arrival on the British beaches had been seriously disrupted by bad weather and choppy seas, and the absence of DD tanks altogether was largely responsible for the heavier casualties on Omaha, the only beach with heavier resistance than Juno. Canadian historian Terry Copp attributes the steady advance of the 7th Brigade in the afternoon to "less serious opposition" than the North Shore Regiment encountered in Tailleville.

Despite the verdict of a successful D-Day for the 3rd CID, the failure of Canadian units to reach their final objectives has proven more disputed than the reasons for their success. Terry Copp places the blame on Keller, who committed the entirety of the 9th Brigade reserve to land on the narrower beaches of the 8th Brigade—which was itself still fighting to clear the seaside towns—after receiving reports of poor progress by the 7th Brigade. Dutch historian Dan van der Vat notes that "the planned breakout of the 9th Brigade was held up by a huge jam of vehicles". Wilmot also places the blame with logistical difficulties of the landing, saying that "on the whole it was not so much the opposition in front as the congestion behind—on the beaches and in Bernières—that prevented the Canadians from reaching their final D-Day objective". Stacey offers a different view, suggesting that it was not impossible for the 3rd CID to reach its D-Day objectives, and that the failure to do so rests in the fact that "British and Canadian forces were usually better at deceiving the enemy and achieving initial success in an assault than they were at exploiting surprise and success once achieved. Perhaps they were rather too easily satisfied". Copp disagrees with Stacey's assessment, suggesting that such caution was not the result of poor planning but of the fact that "the British and Canadians fought the way they had been trained, moving forward to designated objectives in controlled bounds and digging in at the first sign of a counterattack". He also disputes whether the capture of the final objectives would have been strategically intelligent, observing that "if 9th Brigade had reached Carpiquet and dug in, with artillery in position to offer support, the commander of the 26th Panzer Grenadiers might have followed orders and waited until a coordinated counterattack with other divisions had been organized. Such an attack might well have done far more damage to the Allied beachhead than the hastily improvised operation actually carried out [on 7 June]".

Stacey offers a second line of analysis on the Canadians' failure to advance to Line Oak, suggesting that difficulties encountered by the British 3rd Infantry Division on Sword caused Dempsey to halt the advance of the entire British Second Army. The British encountered heavy counterattacks by the 21st Panzer Division, which prevented the British 9th Brigade from establishing contact with the Canadians at Juno. Copp wrote that, "Before this withdrawal [of the 21st Panzer Division] became evident, Dempsey had concluded that more armoured counter-attacks could be expected. So he ordered the three assault divisions to dig in at their second line of objectives. This decision was relayed to subordinate commanders somewhere after 19:00", just as the 9th Canadian Brigade was preparing to advance south towards Carpiquet. Wilmot wrote that the British 3rd Infantry Division brigade commanders were overly cautious in advancing towards Caen and this slowed the Anglo-Canadian advance, especially given the reports of counter-attacks Dempsey received from Sword.

=== Casualties ===
Predictions of the casualties on Juno had been about 2,000 men, including 600 drowned. The 3rd Canadian Infantry Division suffered 340 men killed, 574 wounded and 47 taken prisoner. The Queen's Own Rifles suffered 143 casualties, the most of any battalion, the Royal Winnipegs 128, the North Shore 125 and the Regina Rifles 108. Of the landing craft used on the run-in to Juno, 90 of 306 were lost or damaged. Due to the lack of records for D-Day, casualties for the German 716th Infantry Division are unknown. (Note: Stacey notes that "the 716th Division reported that little information concerning the beach battle was available [on 6 June], observation having been hindered by smoke screens and communications disrupted ... while few of the troops who held the beach defences ever returned to report".) Of the four German battalions numbering 7,771 men before the invasion, Richter reported that the equivalent of only one battalion—at 80 per cent strength—remained. At least one of the two conscript battalions of the 716th was reported to have fled. Richter also reported that 80 per cent of the divisional artillery had been destroyed or captured on D-Day, while only two gun batteries were intact west of the River Orne. By 9 June, the division had been reduced to a battlegroup of 292 officers and men.

== Commemoration ==
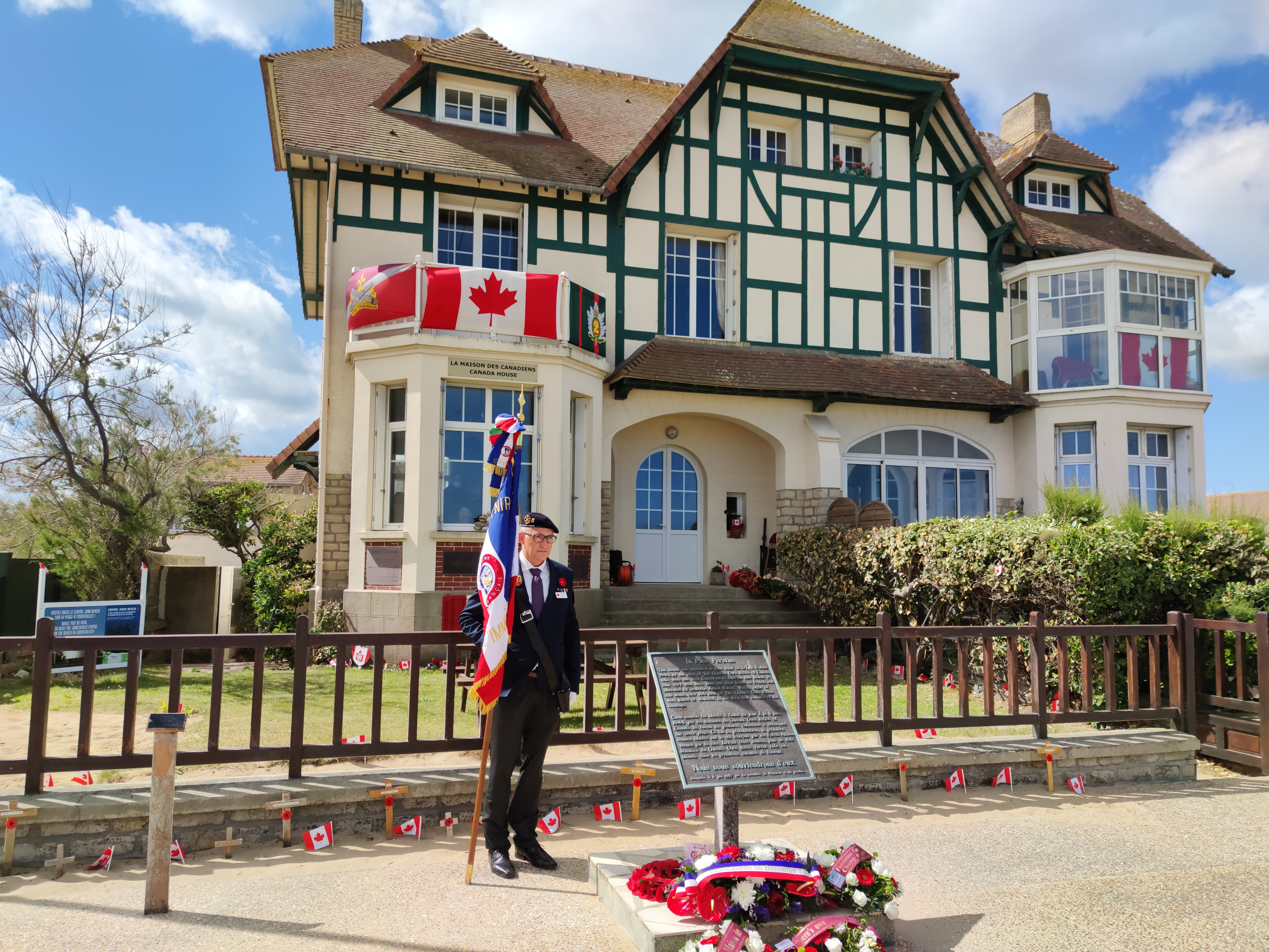
The "Canada House", on Juno Beach, Bernières-sur-Mer, during the 76th anniversary of the D-Day landings.

The landing is commemorated today by the museum and memorial at the Juno Beach Centre in Courseulles-sur-Mer as well as exhibits at the Canadian War Museum and other Canadian military museums. One of the Sherman tanks that landed at Juno, the M4A3 Sherman Bomb, fought all the way into Germany and is today preserved at Sherbrooke, Quebec. Another Sherman that landed on Juno, the M4A2 Sherman Holy Roller is preserved at Victoria Park, London, Ontario, and fought through to VE Day in Germany.

In Bernières-sur-Mer, the owners of a house facing the beach hold memorial services yearly. The house is now named "Canada House".

The last surviving member of the 48 Royal Marine Commandos who landed at Juno Beach is Dennis George Donovan.

== See also ==
- List of ships in Juno Bombardment Group
- Military history of Canada during World War II
- Normandy Massacres

== Bibliography ==
- Ambrose, Stephen E. (1995). D-Day, June 6, 1944. New York: Touchstone. ISBN 0-684-80137-X.
- Barris, Ted (2004). Juno. Canadians at D-Day: June 6, 1944. Markham, ON: Thomas Allen. ISBN 0-88762-133-3.
- Bercuson, David (2004). Maple Leaf Against the Axis. Red Deer Press. ISBN 978-0-88995-305-5.
- Buckingham, William F. (2004). D-Day: The First 72 Hours. Tempus. ISBN 978-0-7524-2842-0.
- Caddick-Adams, Peter (2012). Monty and Rommel: Parallel Lives. Random House. ISBN 978-1-848-09154-2.
- Cawthorne, Nigel (2005). Victory in World War II. London: Arcturus. ISBN 1-84193-351-1.
- Copp, Terry (2004) [2003]. Fields of Fire: The Canadians in Normandy. Toronto: University of Toronto Press. ISBN 978-0-8020-3780-0.
- Ellis, Major L. F.; Allen, Captain G. R. G.; Warhurst, Lieutenant-Colonel A. E. & Robb, Air Chief-Marshal Sir James (2004) [1st. pub. HMSO 1962]. Butler, J. R. M. (ed.). Victory in the West: The Battle of Normandy. History of the Second World War United Kingdom Military Series. Vol. I. Naval & Military Press. ISBN 978-1-84574-058-0.
- Fisher, Stephen (2024). Sword Beach: The Untold Story of D-Day's Forgotten Battle. Transworld. ISBN 978-1787636712.
- Ford, Ken (2004). Juno Beach. Sutton. ISBN 978-0750930079.
- Granatstein, J. L.; Morton, Desmond (1994) [1984]. Bloody Victory: Canadians and the D-Day Campaign 1944. Toronto: Lester. ISBN 1-895555-56-6.
- Hallion, Richard (1994). D-Day 1944: Air Power Over the Normandy Beaches and Beyond. Washington, D.C.: Air Force History Museums Program. ISBN 0-16-043205-7.
- Hastings, Max (1984). Overlord: D-Day and the Battle for Normandy. London: Pan. ISBN 0-7181-2326-3.
- Keegan, John (1982). Six Armies in Normandy: From D-Day to the Liberation at Paris. London: Pimlico. ISBN 0-670-64736-5.
- Milner, Marc (2007). D-Day to Carpiquet: The North Shore Regiment and the Liberation of Europe. Fredericton, NB: Goose Lane. ISBN 978-0-86492-489-6.
- Roy, Reginald H. (1952). Canadian Participation in the Operations in North-West Europe, 1944: Part 1: The assault and subsequent operations of 3 Canadian Inf Div and 2 Canadian Armd Bde 6–30 Jun 44 (Report). Directorate of History, Department of National Defence.
- Roy, Reginald (1984). 1944: The Canadians in Normandy. Toronto: Macmillan of Canada. ISBN 0-7715-9796-7.
- Ryan, Cornelius (1959). The Longest Day: June 6, 1944. New York: Popular Library. ISBN 0-445-08380-8.
- Saunders, Tim (2004). Juno Beach: 3rd Canadian & 79th Armoured Divisions. Montreal: McGill-Queen's University Press. ISBN 0-7735-2792-3.
- Stacey, C. P. (1966) [1960]. The Victory Campaign, 1944–1945 (PDF). Official History of the Canadian Army in the Second World War. Vol. III. Ottawa: The Queen's Printer. OCLC 317692683. Archived from the original (PDF) on 21 December 2020.
- Vat, Dan van der (2003). D-Day; The Greatest Invasion, A People's History. Vancouver: Madison Press. ISBN 1-55192-586-9.
- Wieviorka, Olivier (2008). The Landings to the Liberation of Paris. Cambridge, MA: Harvard University Press. ISBN 978-0-674-02838-8.
- Wilmot, Chester (1952). The Struggle for Europe. London: Collins Clear-Type Press. OCLC 476721246.
- Zuehlke, Mark (2004). Juno Beach: Canada's D-Day Victory – June 6, 1944. Vancouver: Douglas & McIntyre. ISBN 1-55365-050-6.
