= List of ships in Juno Bombardment Group =

Ships supporting the 1944 Normandy landings

Below is a list of ships responsible for bombarding targets at Juno Beach as part of the Normandy landings on June 6, 1944, the opening day of Operation Overlord, the Allied operation that launched the successful invasion of German-occupied western Europe during World War II.

Juno Bombardment Group
Name	Type	National service
Belfast	Light cruiser	Royal Navy
Diadem	Light cruiser	Royal Navy
Algonquin	Destroyer	Royal Canadian Navy
Bleasdale	Destroyer	Royal Navy
La Combattante	Destroyer	French Navy
Faulknor	Destroyer	Royal Navy
Fury	Destroyer	Royal Navy
Glaisdale	Destroyer (Hunt class)	Royal Norwegian Navy
Kempenfelt	Destroyer	Royal Navy
Sioux	Destroyer	Royal Canadian Navy
Stevenstone	Destroyer	Royal Navy
