= Banville, Calvados =

Banville
- Commune
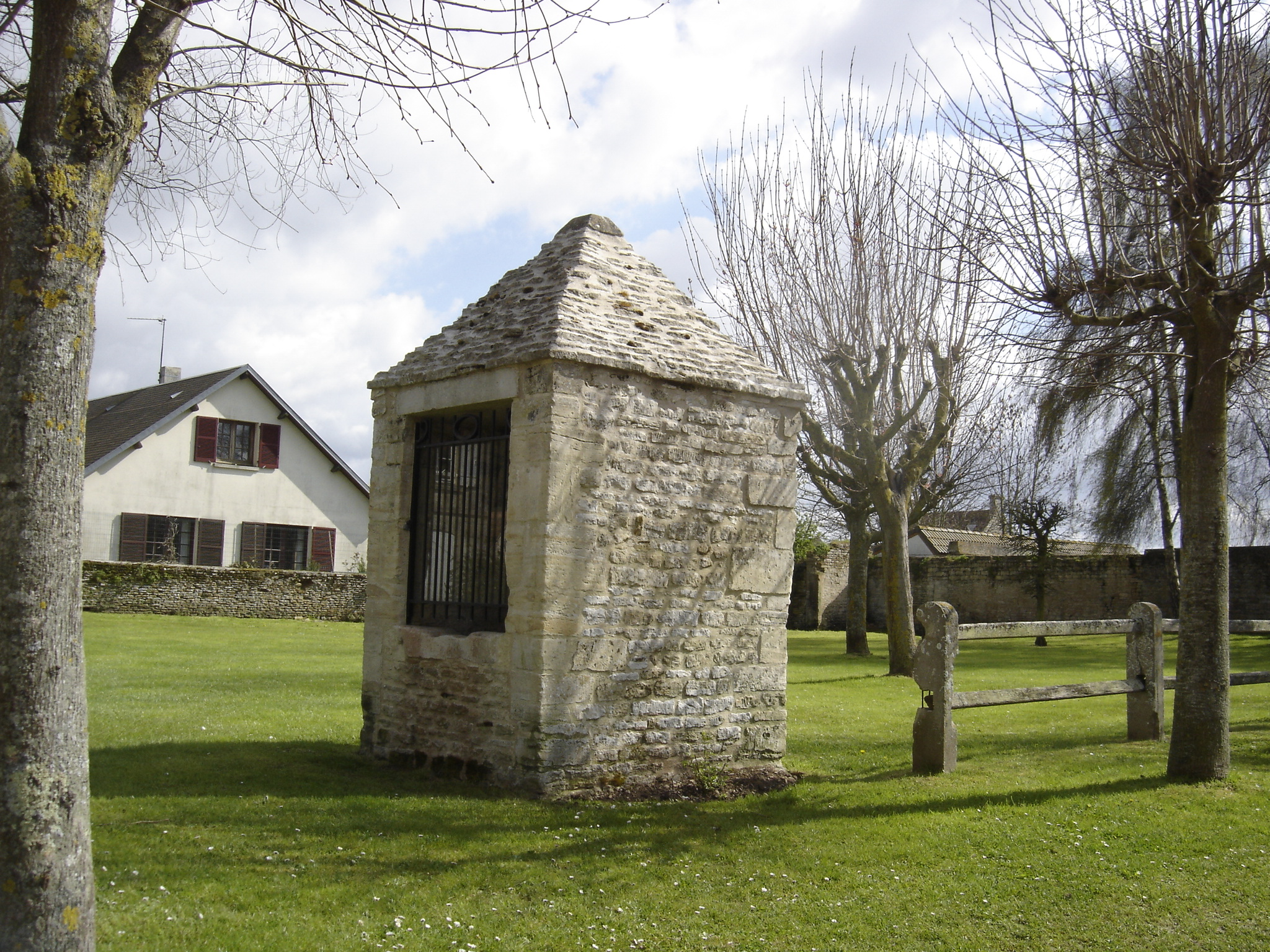
- A covered well in Banville

- Coat of arms
- Location of Banville
- Location within France Location within Normandy
- Coordinates: 49°18′48″N 0°29′13″W
- Country: France
- Region: Normandy
- Department: Calvados
- Arrondissement: Bayeux
- Canton: Courseulles-sur-Mer
- Intercommunality: CC Seulles Terre Mer

Government
  - Mayor (2020–2026): Nadine Baca
- Area^{1}: 4.68 km^{2} (1.81 sq mi)
- Elevation: 25 m (82 ft)
- Highest elevation: 53 m (174 ft)
- Lowest elevation: 2 m (6.6 ft)
- Population (2023): 797
  - Density: 170/km^{2} (441/sq mi)
- Time zone: UTC+01:00 (CET)
  - Summer (DST): UTC+02:00 (CEST)
- INSEE/Postal code: 14038 /14480
- ^{1} French Land Register data, which excludes lakes, ponds, glaciers > 1 km^{2} (0.386 sq mi or 247 acres) and river estuaries.

Banville (French pronunciation: [bɑ̃vil]) is a commune in the Calvados department in the Normandy region of north-western France.

== Geography ==
Banville is located in the Bessin area some 3 km south-west of Courseulles-sur-Mer and 5 km east of Crépon. Access to the commune is by the D12 road from Graye-sur-Mer in the north which passes through the village and continues south-west to Tierceville. The D112A goes west from the village to Sainte-Croix-sur-Mer. The commune is mostly farmland but with a significant sized residential area.

The Seulles river forms the entire eastern border of the commune as it flows north to the English Channel at Courseulles-sur-Mer.

== History ==
During the invasion of Normandy Banville was located within 3 kilometres of Juno Beach (Mike sector), the landing zone for Canadian troops. The village was liberated on the 6 June 1944 by the Royal Winnipeg Rifles.

=== Heraldry ===
Arms of Banville	Blazon: Vair.

== Administration ==
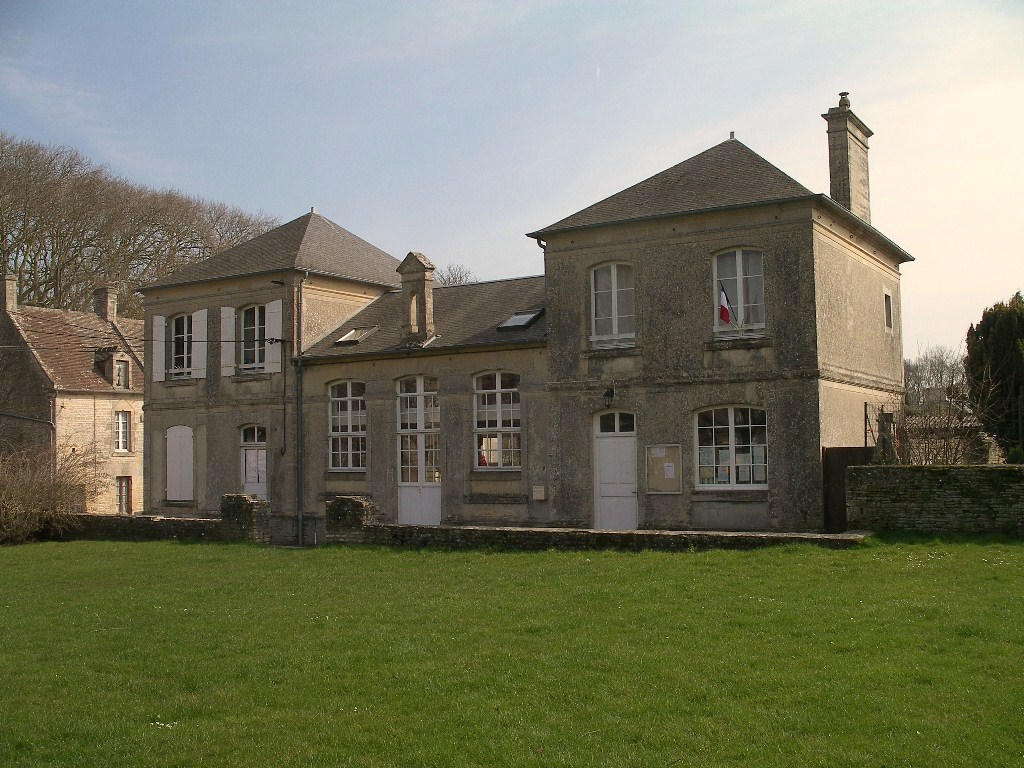
The Town Hall

List of Successive Mayors

From	To	Name
1945	1981	Pierre Bianquis
1981	2008	Florence Lefrancois
2008	2020	Chrystèle Pouchain
2020	2026	Nadine Baca

== Demography ==
The inhabitants of the commune are known as Banvillais or Banvillaises in French.

Historical population

Year	Pop.	±% p.a.
1793	684	—
1821	612	−0.40%
1846	611	−0.01%
1872	517	−0.64%
1901	390	−0.97%
1926	328	−0.69%
1946	351	+0.34%
1962	356	+0.09%
1968	382	+1.18%

Year	Pop.	±% p.a.
1975	407	+0.91%
1982	475	+2.23%
1990	514	+0.99%
1999	585	+1.45%
2007	622	+0.77%
2012	684	+1.92%
2017	792	+2.98%
2023	797	+0.10%

Source: EHESS and INSEE

== Culture and heritage ==
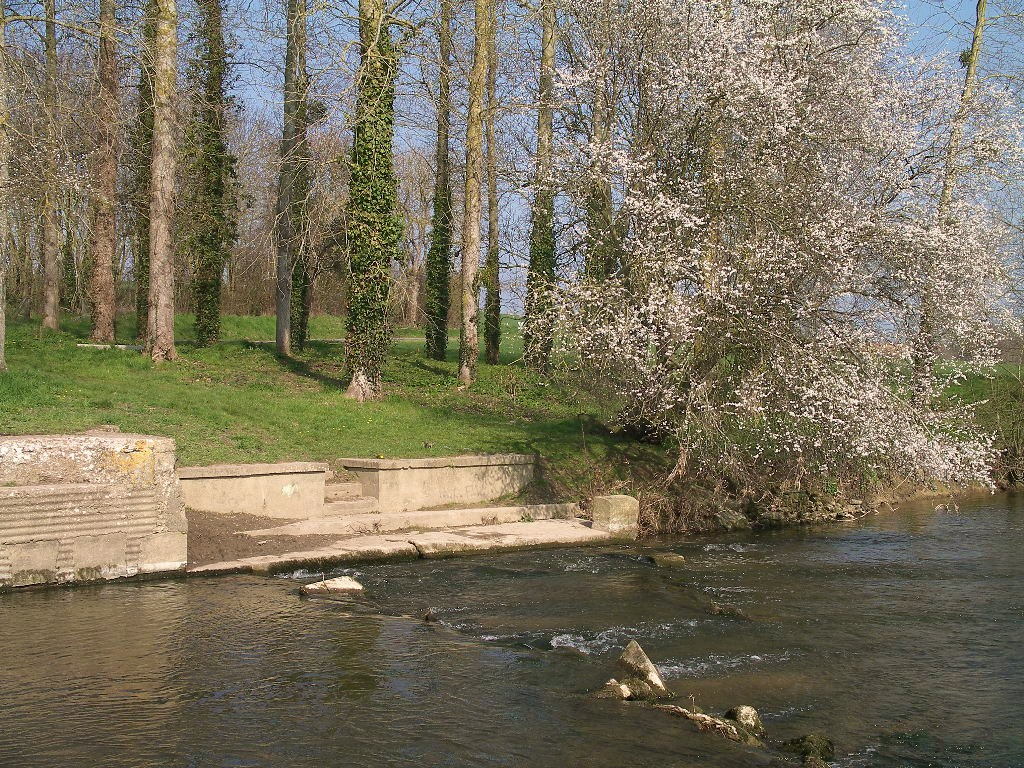
Remains of the Lavoir

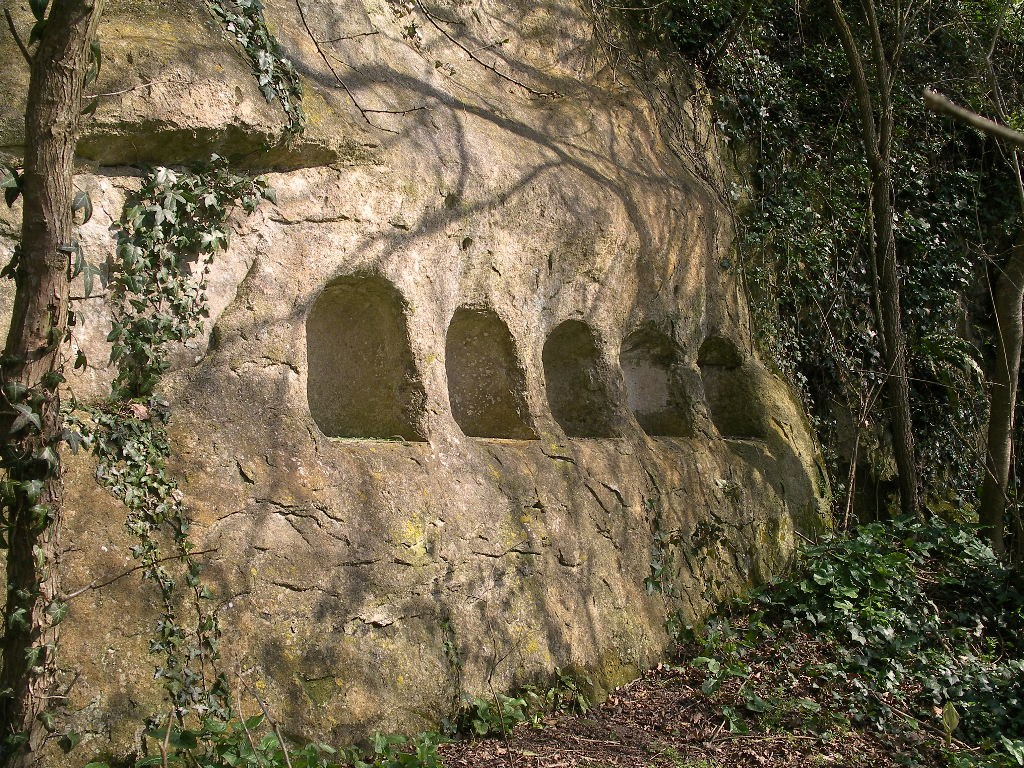
The remains of the Roman Camp

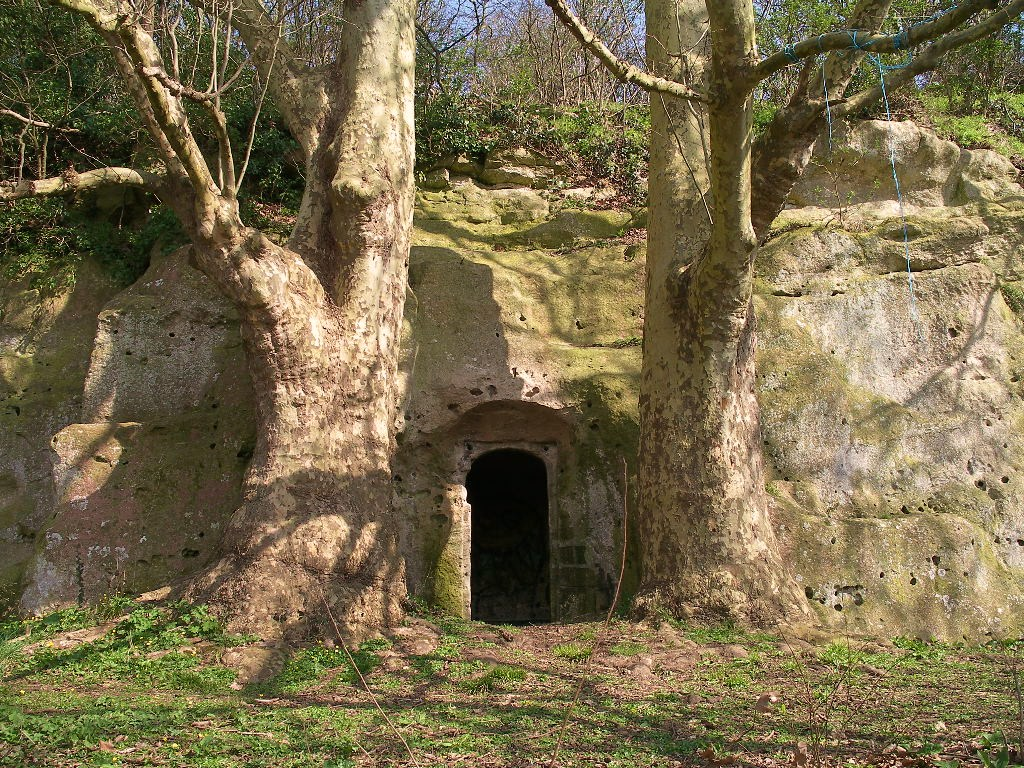
An Underground living cave in the Roman camp

=== Civil heritage ===
The commune has many buildings and structures that are registered as historical monuments:

- The Reviers Bridge (17th century)
- The Hervot Farmhouse at 12 rue du Bout du Haut (1913)
- A Farmhouse at 25 Rue du Camp Romain (18th century)
- A Notable's House at 8 Rue du Marché (18th century)
- A Lavoir (Public laundry) at Route de Reviers (19th century)
- A Chateau (1545)
- A Girls' Primary School (19th century)
- The old Town Hall (19th century)
- The Village (Neolithic)
- Houses (18th-19th century)

Other sites of interest

- The Roman Camp of La Burette.

=== Religious heritage ===
The commune has several religious buildings and structures that are registered as historical monuments:

- A Presbytery at 10 Rue du Bout du Haut (18th century)
- A Calvary at Route de Courseulles-Sur-Mer (1912)
- The Parish Church of Saint-Lo (18th century)

The Church contains many items that are registered as historical objects:

- A Stole (19th century)
- A Ciborium (18th century)
- A Monstrance (19th century)
- A Way of the Cross (19th century)
- A Chalice with Paten (19th century)
- 3 Processional Banners (19th century)
- A Painting: Nativity (17th century)
- A Statue: Virgin and child (17th century)
- A Statue: Saint Nicolas de Bari (18th century)
- A Cross: Christ on the Cross (18th century)
- 2 banks of Stalls (19th century)
- A Paschal Candlestick (19th century)
- A Rood beam (19th century)
- A Baptismal font (16th century)
- A set of 7 Stained glass windows: Seven Sacrements (1959)
- A set of 6 Stained glass windows (1959)
- The Furniture in the Church

== Notable people linked to the commune ==
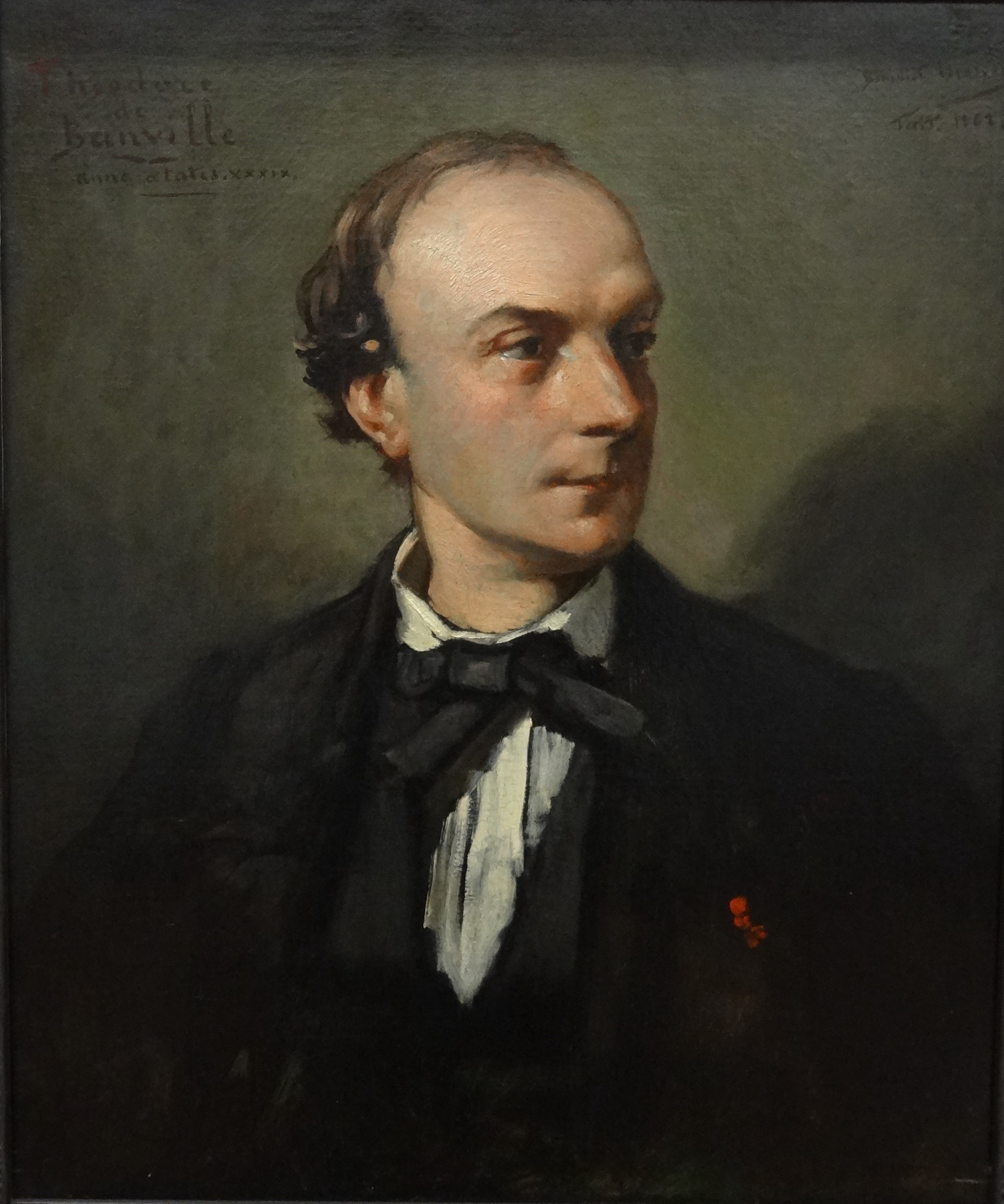
Théodore de Banville by Bénédict Masson 1862

- Théodore Faullain de Banville (1823-1891), French poet, the Faullain family of Banville were well established since the 1750s at Moulins (Allier), but were originally from the commune.

== See also ==
- Communes of the Calvados department
