= 19th Field Regiment, RCA =

19th Canadian Army Field Regiment, RCA
- Active: August 1941 to December 1945
- Country: Canada
- Allegiance: Canada
- Branch: Canadian Forces, Royal Canadian Artillery Personnel Branch
- Type: Field artillery
- Size: Three batteries
- Nickname: Hell on Wheels
- Mottos: Ubique. Quo fas et gloria ducunt. (Everywhere. Whither right and glory lead)
- Engagements: World War II: Operation Overlord; Normandy Landings (Juno Beach); Operation Windsor; Battle for Caen; Battle of Le Mesnil-Patry; Operation Charnwood; Operation Atlantic; Operation Goodwood; Operation Totalize; Operation Tractable; Falaise Pocket

Commanders
- Notable commanders: Commanders: Lt. Col. C.D. Crowe; M.C., E.D. (18 Dec. 1941 - 1 Jan. 1943); Lt. Col. L.G. Clarke; O.B.E. (1 Jan. 1943 - 10 Dec. 1944); Lt. Col. R.D. Telford (10 Dec. 1944 - 17 June 1945); Lt. Col A.G. Goldie; D.S.O. (17 June 1945 - Dec. 1945)

The 19th Canadian Army Field Regiment (Self Propelled) Royal Canadian Artillery (RCA) was a Field Artillery regiment in the Canadian Armed Forces during the Second World War. They would see action in France, Belgium, and the Netherlands, before ending the war in Germany. It was commonly referred to as The 19th Field Regiment, The 19th Army Field Regiment, The 19th Field or by the men of the regiment, Hell on Wheels.

== Canada ==
The 19th Field received its mobilizing orders in August 1941, for three batteries to be formed from the three Reserve Brigade areas in Military District No. 1. The batteries were the 55th Field Battery (London, Ontario), the 63rd Field Battery (Guelph, Ontario), and the 99th Field Battery (Wingham, Ontario). From September 1941 to July 1943, the 19th Field was brought up to full strength and received training at Camp Borden, Ontario; Shilo, Manitoba; Prince Rupert, British Columbia; and Petawawa, Ontario.

During this time, they trained first with 18-pounders, 4.5" howitzers, and finally, what would become their main armament in Europe, the 25-pounder RAM, better known as the Sexton.

== England ==
On 5 July 1943, the 19th Field received orders to move overseas. They left Halifax on 21 July on board the RMS Queen Elizabeth and arrived in Greenock 27 July 1943 and fell under the command of the II Canadian Corps. On 19 October 1943, the 19th Field was briefly transferred to the command of the 5th Canadian Armoured Division before once again being transferred to the 3rd Canadian Infantry Division when the 5th was moved to the Italian Campaign. Between July 1943 and May 1944, the 19th Field would begin training for the coming invasion of mainland Europe and exchanged their Sextons for American M7 Priests, which were self-propelled 25-pounders, similar to the Sexton that had an armament of 105mm and could fire a distance of 11,500 yards.

While in England, the 19th took part in several training operations, but specifically "Exercise Savvy". It was the first divisional training exercise the regiment took part in, which focused on the firing of artillery on ships towards coastal targets and landing on beaches under fire. While in England, the 19th Field was also inspected by General Bernard Montgomery on 28 February 1944, and King George VI on 25 April 1944, in the prelude to the invasion of Europe.

On 23 May 1944, the 19th Field's camp was sealed for security reasons and plans were finalized for Operation Overlord: the long-awaited invasion of German occupied France. The final preparations were made as all vehicles were waterproofed and ammunition was brought up. On 1 June 1944, the 19th Field moved to its marshalling areas in Gosport and Southampton before embarking on the longest day. On June 3, 1944, Forward Observation Officers (FOOs) went to their respective units with the North Shore Regiment as Landing Craft were prepared to be filled with infantry units.

== D-Day: 6 June 1944 ==
The Canadian assault on Juno Beach had three infantry brigades – the 7th, 8th and 9th – of the 3rd Canadian Infantry Division with the 7th landing at Courseulles-sur-Mer, the 8th at Bernieres-sur-Mer and St. Aubin-sur-Mer with the 9th landing after the initial assault passing through the 8th's sector and advancing on Authie and Carpiquet airfield before capturing the high ground above Caen. The 19th was attached to the 8th brigade and the 12th, 13th, and 14th Field Regiments were also involved bringing a total of 96 M7 Priest guns into action. Specifically, the 19th was part of the 14th Canadian Field Regiment Artillery Group led by Lt.-Col. H.S. Griffin with each regiment firing towards the beaches from four Landing Craft towards their target of Nan Red beach.

The Landing Craft carrying the 19th and the other three Field Regiments advanced at about 6:30 a.m. with the 22nd and 30th LCT Flotilla carrying the 24 M7 Priests of the 19th. At 7:39 a.m., Major Peene the Fire Control Officer, gave the order to commence firing when they were 9,000 yards out. The guns of the 19th were the first Canadian to go into action and began firing towards northern France to signal the imminent invasion of German occupied Europe. Each gun launched 100 to 150 rounds over the course of about 30 minutes further saturating the German held territory. One gun from each of the six troops were firing phosphorus shells with seven fires being started on the Nan Red beach The commander of the 3rd Canadian Infantry Division, General Rod Keller, said the SP's "put on the best shoot they ever did." The Field Regiments had their M7 Priests strapped to the deck of the landing craft and went in firing towards the beaches as planes and naval vessels pounded the beaches. After they reached a 2,000 yards from shore they turned around and passed the inbound North Shore Regiment infantry of the first wave. Once the beachhead had been secured they came around again and landed with the second wave of infantry to provide close artillery support against any German counterattack.

Artillery is often a feared weapon of war, but studies conducted by the 21st Army Group's 2nd Operational Research Section found the gunners were highly inaccurate thanks to the intense waves of the English Channel. The report said the 19th missed their targets by up to 1,000 yards since they were sent on the wrong course inland by the navy. Once it was corrected, the inaccuracy prevailed with the unpredictable English Channel wreaking havoc on the sights of the gunners. They were still about 700 yards wide and 300 yards deep from their intended target. Also causing difficulty was that the concrete fortifications were between three and seven feet in thickness.

At 9:10 a.m. 'D' Troop of the 63rd Battery landed west of St. Aubin-sur-Mer under mortar and rifle fire on Nan Red beach and within 10 minutes they had their first gun 200 yards inland and in action providing fire support. 'C' Troop followed shortly after with 'E' and 'F' Troop also landing and in action by 10 a.m. with the 55th Battery and Q Battery being delayed due to a rudder being damaged and massive traffic trying to land on the beaches.

Shortly after landing, the 19th took their first casualties of the war with Lt. Malcolm, the regimental survey officer, being wounded and Gunner B.T. McHughen being killed. A further two men were killed and 17 more wounded on the first day. The regiment had its vehicle damaged when a M7 Priest of 'E' Troop hitting a mine and a track was blown off with it taking two hours to repair. The 55th Battery also faced its first difficulty when an ammunition explosion had two M7 Priests and a Bren Carrier catch fire quickly spreading to other vehicles and threatening to become larger as it moved towards live ammunition. Gunner H.R. Chaplin, already wounded from shrapnel, jumped in the Bren Carrier that had the ammunition and moved it safety to prevent further casualties or damage. Chaplin received the Military Medal for this act.

They ran into the German 716th Infantry Division that was primarily used as an occupation division and primarily made up of Polish, Russians, Ukrainians and other nationalities from the Soviet Union who were pressed into service. They had mostly obsolete Czechoslovak equipment from the late-1930s, but also had a small cadre of non-commissioned officers that had combat experience on the Eastern Front giving the green troops veteran leadership.

The 19th ended D-Day in positions just outside St. Aubin-sur-Mer with them being called for close fire support multiple times throughout the day as German tanks and infantry counterattacked the positions gained by Canadian infantry. With night falling over northern France and the Allied beachhead secured the 19th had three soldiers killed and another 18 wounded in the first 24 hours of Operation Overlord.

== Route Followed in Action ==
=== Normandy ===
- June 6, 1944 – St. Aubin-sur-Mer (Juno Beach, Nan Red sector)
- June 8, 1944 – Basly
- July 3, 1944 – Bretteville L'Org-Euilleuse
- July 5, 1944 – Bouanville
- July 8, 1944 – Rosel
- July 10, 1944 – St. Germaine
- July 17, 1944 – Le Landel
- July 19, 1944 – North of Caen
- July 21, 1944 – Cormelles
- July 31, 1944 – Villons les Buissons
- August 9, 1944 – Roquancourt Cintheaux
- August 11, 1944 – St. Aignan de Cramesnil
- August 14, 1944 – Northeast Bretteville le Robert
- August 15, 1944 – Bout du Haut, north of Olenden
- August 17, 1944 – Southeast of Perrieres
- August 19, 1944 – Northeast of Trun
- August 23, 1944 – Bayeux
- August 31, 1944 – Le Gros la Thiel

=== France ===
- September 1, 1944 – Crossing the Seine River near Mesnil Raoul
- September 5, 1944 – Biencourt
- September 6, 1944 – Cross the Somme River
- September 7, 1944 – St. Omer
- September 8, 1944 – Entered Belgium

=== Belgium ===
- September 8, 1944 – Hoogstde
- September 10, 1944 – Den Daelo
- September 12, 1944 – Syssaele
- September 13, 1944 – Maele
- September 16, 1944 – Eeklo
- September 17, 1944 – Ertvelde
- September 19, 1944 – Fonteine
- September 21, 1944 – West of Sas van Gent
- September 22, 1944 – Caprycke

=== Netherlands ===
- October 8, 1944 – Sluiskil
- October 9, 1944 – West of Hoek (Paulina beach, Biervliet)
- October 18, 1944 – Fort d'Ertbrand
- October 21, 1944 – Calmpthout
- October 23, 1944 – De Lonik
- October 27, 1944 – Vleet
- October 30, 1944 – West of Zoomvliet
- October 31, 1944 – Vrederust
- November 5, 1944 – North of Steenbergen
- November 7, 1944 – Vrederust
- November 8, 1944 – Northeast of Tilburg
- November 10, 1944 – Drunen
- November 12, 1944 – Molenhoek (Horssen)
- December 9, 1944 – Vlijmen
- January 13, 1945 – Waalwijk
- January 14, 1945 – Vlijmen
- January 25, 1945 – Waalwijk
- February 1, 1945 – Vlijmen
- February 3, 1945 – Groesbeek

=== Germany ===
- February 11, 1945 – Reichswald Forest
- February 20, 1945 – Louisendorf
- February 27, 1945 – Northeast of Uedem
- March 2, 1945 – Hochwald Forest
- March 5, 1945 – Xanten Forest
- March 9, 1945 – Boomenhof
- March 12, 1945 – Tilburg
- March 22, 1945 – Huisberden
- March 31, 1945 – Cleve
- April 1, 1945 – Bienen, near Rhine River
- April 2, 1945 – Barchem (Netherlands)
- April 3, 1945 – Gegdam
- April 5, 1945 – North of Borne (Netherlands)
- April 6, 1945 – Neuenhaus
- April 8, 1945 – Meppen, west canal
- April 9, 1945 – Meppen, east canal
- April 10, 1945 – Sogel
- April 11, 1945 – Werhlt
- April 12, 1945 – South of Friesoythe
- April 15, 1945 – North of Friesoythe
- April 25, 1945 – Kusten canal
- April 29, 1945 – Burgfelde
- May 3, 1945 – Northeast of Bad Zwischenahn
- May 4, 1945 – Bake
- May 5, 1945 – Near Wilfstede

== Regiment's Batteries ==
- The 55th: Was formed in London, Ontario and was composed of "A" (Able) and "B" (Baker) Troop.
- The 63rd: Was formed in Guelph, Ontario and was composed of "C" (Charlie) and "D" (Dog) Troop. "D" Troop was the first unit in the 19th Field to see combat in the Second World War when they landed on the morning of June 6, 1944.
- The 99th: Was formed from the area surrounding Wingham, Ontario and was composed of "E" (Easy) and "F" (Fox) Troop.
- Q Battery: Q Battery was the regimental headquarters, which also included logistical troops attached with the 19th Field Regiment. Unlike the other three batteries, there was no central location for organizing Q Battery. This is largely due to many soldiers and officers being transferred and promoted as the war went on.

== Casualties in Action ==
- 38 Killed (3 Officers, 35 Other Ranks) (3 Died of Wounds, 1 Death, 6 Accidentally Killed, 28 Killed in Action)
- 118 Wounded (14 Officers, 104 Other Ranks)
- 1 Prisoner (1 Officer)

Killed in Action

1. Gunner Arthur Baird
2. Gunner Arthur William Curphey
3. Gunner Bernard Thomas McHughen
4. Lance Bombardier Charles Edward Marshall
5. Gunner Charles Louis Barron (Died of Wounds)
6. Gunner Charles Walter Irwin Traer
7. Gunner Don Bohdan Rawluk (accidentally killed)
8. Gunner Edward James Patterson (accidentally killed)
9. Gunner Edwin Palm
10. Gunner Francis Henry Walden
11. Signalman George Gadsdon (accidentally killed)
12. Gunner Gordon Sinclair Fisher
13. Gunner Gordon Robert Douglas
14. Bombardier Harold Chester Wetherup (accidentally killed)
15. Gunner Harold Edward Gibbs
16. Gunner Harold Elmer Warden (Died of Wounds)
17. Gunner Harvey Lloyd Walker
18. Captain Hedley Maurice Harrison
19. Gunner Henry Bolton Hennings (accidentally killed)
20. Captain James McLean McKague
21. Gunner John Bradley
22. Gunner John Cameron Samuel Robinson
23. Captain John Lawrence Murdoch
24. Bombardier John Owen Gibbons (Died of Wounds)
25. Gunner John Vimy Mugford
26. Gunner Joseph Eccleston
27. Gunner Kenneth Bruce Childs
28. Sergeant Murray Oliver Kirby
29. Gunner Pierre William Foss
30. Gunner Robert Christopher Thompson
31. Gunner Robert Fintan Keating
32. Gunner Robert Orr Douglas Rock
33. Gunner Steven Stratychuk
34. Gunner Vincenso Ruggerio
35. Gunner Walter Carlyle Little
36. Gunner Walter Gordon Ward
37. Signalman William Colin Soule
38. Signalman William Domville Clark
39. Sergeant William Hubert Graham (accidentally killed)

== Honours and awards ==
- 1 – Order of the British Empire (O.B.E.) (Lt. Col. L.G. Clarke)
- 3 – Military Cross (Capt. T. Bond, Capt. R.I. Grant, Capt. V.C. Morrison)
- 1 – Croix de Guerre with Gilt Star (Major A.B. Peene)
- 1 – Croix de Guerre with Bronze Cross (Sjt. L.G. Furniss)
- 1 – Military Medal (Gnr. H.R. Chaplin)
- 6 – Mentioned in Despatches (Major A.B. Peene, Capt. G.R. Malcolm, Capt. J.L. Murdoch, Capt. J.C. Stewart, Sjt. L.G. Furniss (Twice), Lsjt. W.J. Simon (Twice))
- 1 – Commander-in-Chief's Certificate (Gnr. D. McLaggain)

== Commanding officers ==
- Lt. Col. C.D. Crowe; M.C., E.D. (18 Dec. 1941 – 1 Jan. 1943)
- Lt. Col. L.G. Clarke; O.B.E. (1 Jan. 1943 – 10 Dec. 1944)
- Lt. Col. R.D. Telford (10 Dec. 1944 – 17 June 1945)

Telford transferred from the 23rd Field Regiment, RCA when he was promoted from Major to Lt. Col.

- Lt. Col. A.G. Goldie; D.S.O. (17 June 1945 – Dec. 1945)
