= Sainte-Croix-sur-Mer =

- Commune
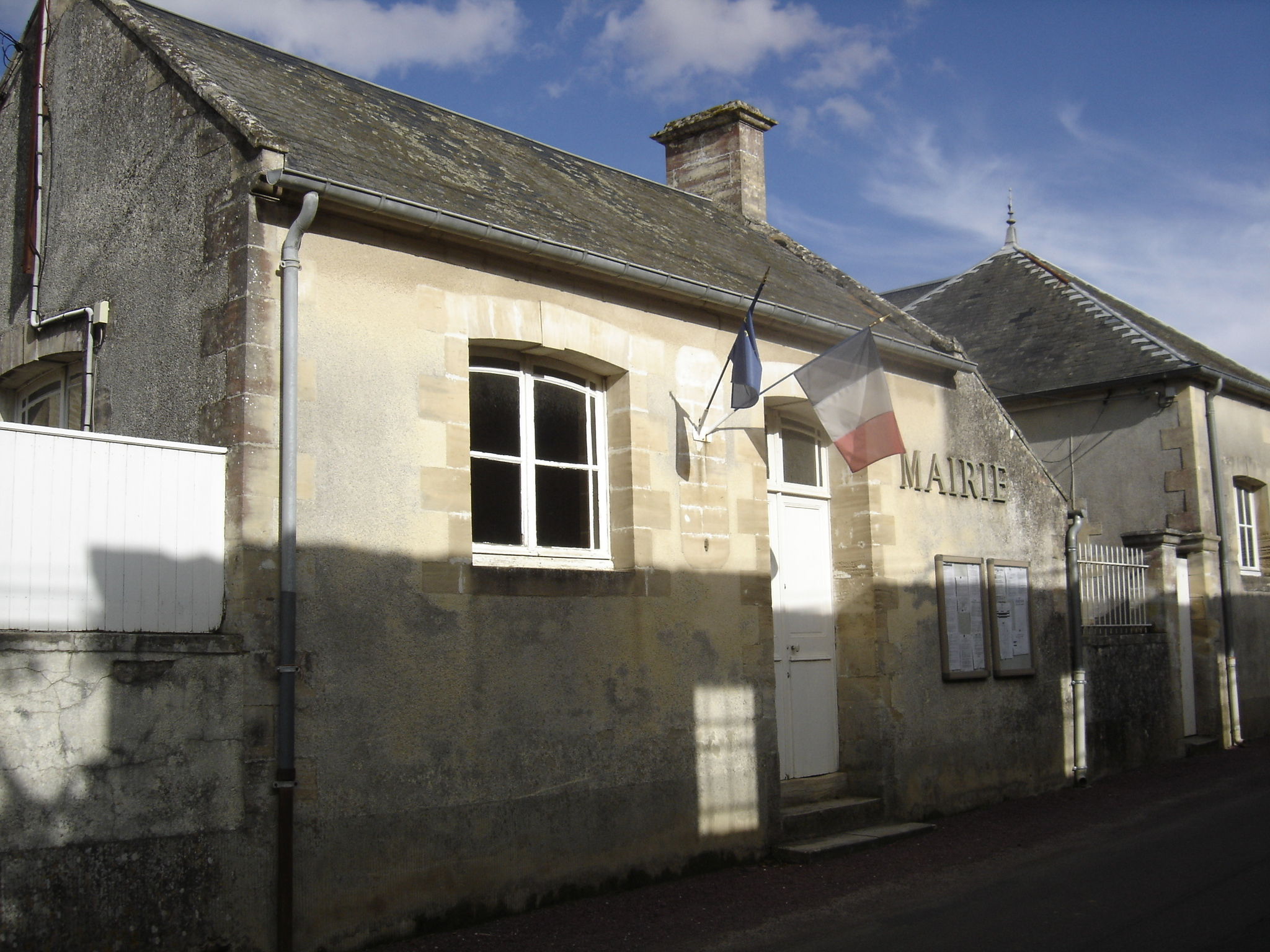
- The town hall in Sainte-Croix-sur-Mer

- Coat of arms
- Location of Sainte-Croix-sur-Mer
- Location within France Location within Normandy
- Coordinates: 49°18′51″N 0°30′31″W
- Country: France
- Region: Normandy
- Department: Calvados
- Arrondissement: Bayeux
- Canton: Courseulles-sur-Mer
- Intercommunality: CC Seulles Terre Mer

Government
  - Mayor (2020–2026): Guillaume Lemenager
- Area^{1}: 2.08 km^{2} (0.80 sq mi)
- Elevation: 43 m (141 ft)
- Highest elevation: 56 m (184 ft)
- Lowest elevation: 33 m (108 ft)
- Population (2023): 243
  - Density: 117/km^{2} (303/sq mi)
- Time zone: UTC+01:00 (CET)
  - Summer (DST): UTC+02:00 (CEST)
- INSEE/Postal code: 14569 /14480
- ^{1} French Land Register data, which excludes lakes, ponds, glaciers > 1 km^{2} (0.386 sq mi or 247 acres) and river estuaries.

Sainte-Croix-sur-Mer (French pronunciation: [sɛ̃t kʁwa syʁ mɛʁ], literally Sainte-Croix on Sea) is a commune in the Calvados department in the Normandy region in northwestern France.

== Population ==
Historical population
Year	Pop.	±% p.a.
1968	131	—
1975	119	−1.36%
1982	120	+0.12%
1990	161	+3.74%
1999	201	+2.50%
2007	233	+1.86%
2012	244	+0.93%
2017	246	+0.16%
2023	243	−0.20%
Source: INSEE

== See also ==
- Communes of the Calvados department
