= Heritage Minutes =

Canadian television series

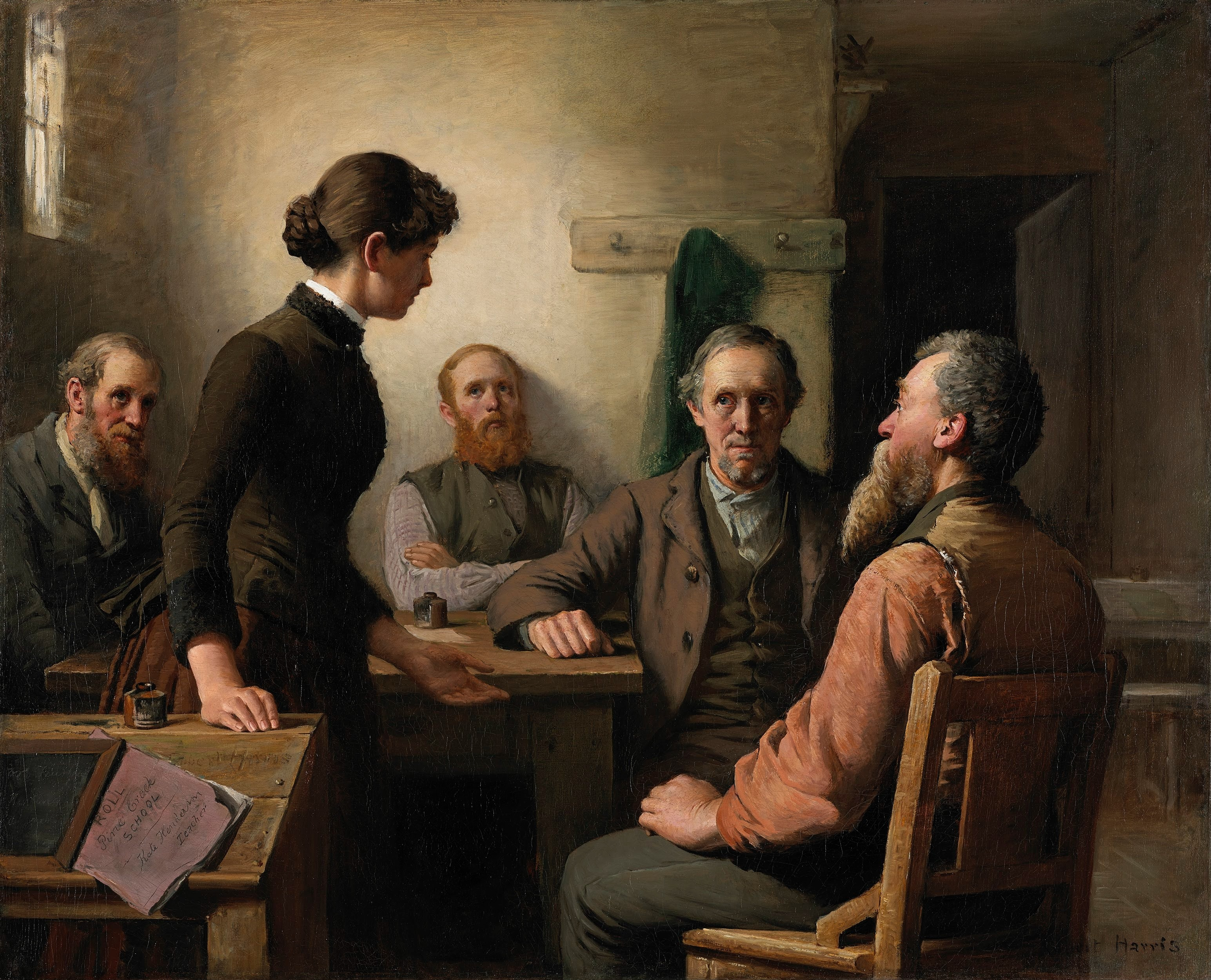
An 1885 Robert Harris painting, A Meeting of the School Trustees, depicted in the 1992 Heritage Minute episode "Rural Teacher", on the benefits of pedagogy

The Heritage Minutes is a series of sixty-second short films, each illustrating an important moment in Canadian history. Published by Historica Canada, the Minutes integrate Canadian history, folklore and myths into dramatic storylines. Like the Canada Vignettes of the 1970s, the Minutes themselves have become a part of Canadian culture and been the subject of academic studies as well as parody.

The Minutes were first introduced on March 31, 1991, as part of a one-off history quiz show hosted by Wayne Rostad. Originally distributed to schools, they appeared frequently on Canadian television and in cinemas before feature films, and were later available online and on DVD. "Radio minutes" have also been made. From 1991 to 1995, 50 episodes aired. In 2012, new Minutes were produced in the lead-up to Canada's sesquicentennial (150th anniversary of Canadian Confederation) in 2017.

The Minutes have featured appearances by some of Canada's best-known personalities, including Jared Keeso, Michael Shanks, Calum Worthy, Colm Feore, Dan Aykroyd, and Kate Nelligan. Voice-over end narration for the Heritage Minutes has been provided by such recognizable voices as Peter Mansbridge, k.d. lang, Adrienne Clarkson, and Lloyd Robertson.

== Background ==
The thirteen original short films were broken up and run between shows on CBC Television and the CTV Network. The continued broadcast of the Minutes and the production of new ones was pioneered by Charles Bronfman's CRB Foundation (subsequently The Historica Dominion Institute), Canada Post (with Bell Canada being a later sponsor), Power Broadcasting (the broadcasting arm of the Power Corporation of Canada), and the National Film Board. They were devised, developed, and largely narrated (as well as scripted) by noted Canadian broadcaster Patrick Watson, while the producer of the series was Robert Guy Scully.

In 2009, "The Historica Foundation of Canada" merged with "The Dominion Institute" to become "The Historica-Dominion Institute", a national charitable organization. In September 2013, the organization changed its name to "Historica Canada". While the foundations have not paid networks to air Minutes, in the early years they have paid to have them run in cinema theatres across the country. The Canadian Radio-television and Telecommunications Commission (CRTC) has ruled that Heritage Minutes are an "on-going dramatic series"; each vignette thus counts as ninety-seconds of a station's Canadian content requirements.

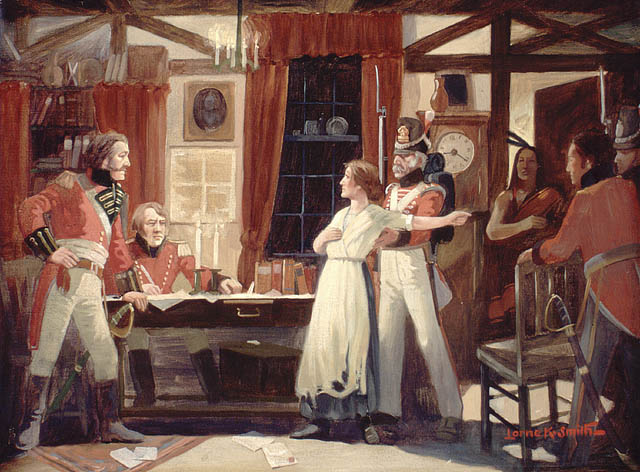
Loyalist Laura Secord warning the British (Lieutenant – James FitzGibbon) and First Nations of an impending American attack at Beaver Dams June 1813. By Lorne Kidd Smith, c. 1920.

The first sets of Heritage Minutes were released in five segments between 1991 and 2000. A set of eight new Heritage Minutes, covering military moments in Canadian history, were released in 2005. In 2012, two new Minutes were created on the War of 1812 in anticipation of the war's bicentenary, and in 2014 two more Minutes were released on John A. Macdonald and George-Étienne Cartier that had been filmed in and around Toronto in September 2013. To honour the centenary of the start of World War I two Minutes were released: one on the Winnipeg Falcons in 2014 and one on Canadian Nursing Sisters in early 2015. In September 2015, to commemorate the 35th anniversary of Terry Fox's run to conquer cancer, Historica released a "Minute" on Fox's inspirational run.

February 2016 saw the release of a "Minute" on Viola Desmond, a trailblazing black female entrepreneur from Halifax who spoke out against racial discrimination in Nova Scotia. On June 21, the 20th anniversary of National Aboriginal Day, Historica Canada released two new Minutes. The first tells the story of Chanie "Charlie" Wenjack, whose death sparked the first inquest into the treatment of Indigenous children in Canadian residential schools. The second, Naskumituwin, highlights the making of Treaty 9 from the perspective of historical witness George Spence, an 18-year-old Cree hunter from Albany, James Bay. On October 19, Historica Canada released another Heritage Minute that shows a story about an Inuk artist named Kenojuak Ashevak. It is also the first Heritage minute that is narrated on not just its official languages (English and French) but also a third language, where this Heritage Minute is narrated in Inuktitut.

A 2012 Ipsos Reid poll of 3,900 Canadians selected the five most popular Minutes. Tied for first place were the episodes on Jackie Robinson and the Halifax Explosion, followed by Jennie Kidd Trout, Winnie-the-Pooh and Laura Secord.

== List ==
Of the over 100 "Heritage Minutes" available online, one on Canadian peacekeeping in Cyprus was pulled from broadcast shortly after its 1991 premiere, and was posted on Historica Canada's YouTube channel only in 2016, while being omitted from the listing on Historica Canada's website. According to The Canadian Encyclopedia published by Historica Canada:

External videos
- The Lost Heritage Minute - "Lester B. Pearson" (variously called "Cyprus" and "Peacekeepers")" – Historica Canada. - Heritage Minutes (1:01 min)

A Minute about Canadian peacekeepers in Cyprus produced in 1991 was criticized by Turkey's ambassador to Canada on the grounds that it depicted Turkish citizens in a poor light. The producers responded that the Minute explored Canada's role in peacekeeping and that no slight to Turkey was intended. The Minute was soon pulled because of historically inaccurate costume details that were discovered after the Minute was released. As well, the Turkish ambassador to Ottawa complained that the Minute treated his country unfairly. However, the producers have said this was not a factor in the decision to pull it from circulation.

In 2020, three Heritage Minutes were deleted from Historica's website and Youtube channel: Louis Riel (1991), Grey Owl (1999), and Sir John A. Macdonald (2014). Historica told CTV News in 2024 that the removal of the Louis Riel Heritage Minute was due to a lack of consultation with the Métis community at the time of production, and concerns about presenting the Heritage Minute in classrooms, due to it graphically showing the hanging of the Metis Leader. However, the Manitoba Métis Federation stated that Historica had not consulted with them about removing the Heritage Minute and expressed support for the violent reality of the depiction. The Grey Owl Heritage Minute was later restored to the Historica website.

Episode	Released	Description
Peacemaker	1992	The formation of the Iroquois Confederacy presented by a First Nations grandfather explaining the significance of the Great Peace to his granddaughter.
Vikings	1992	L'Anse aux Meadows in Newfoundland is settled by Norsemen (Vikings) around the year 1000 CE.
John Cabot	1991	Italian navigator and explorer John Cabot discovers the Grand Banks of Newfoundland.
Jacques Cartier	1991	French navigator and explorer Jacques Cartier misunderstands some Natives resulting in the name Canada.
Jean Nicolet	1992	French coureur des bois and explorer Jean Nicolet becomes the first European to reach Lake Michigan, but thinks it's the Pacific.
Governor Frontenac	1992	New France, under the leadership of French governor Louis de Buade de Frontenac, repels the British invasion at the Battle of Quebec (1690) (narration was later added to this Minute in order to clarify the story).
Syrup	1997	A First Nations family teaches early settlers how to make maple syrup.
Laura Secord	1993	Canadian heroine Laura Secord aids the British in the War of 1812 with an overland trek to warn of an American military advance.
Responsible Government	1991	Queen Victoria decides to grant Canada responsible government after the crushing of the Rebellions of 1837.
Baldwin & LaFontaine	1992	Lawyer and politician Robert Baldwin and Louis-Hippolyte Lafontaine build interlingual cooperation.
Orphans	1991	French Canadian families adopt Irish orphans in the 1850s while allowing them to keep their original names.
Underground Railroad	1991	An African American escapes to Canada along the Underground Railroad.
Etienne Parent	1990	Journalist and government official Étienne Parent demands equality for French and English.
Hart & Papineau	1995	The efforts of politician and lawyer Louis-Joseph Papineau give full equality of religion to Jews in Canada.
The Paris Crew	1995	The surprise victory of the Paris Crew, a group of unheralded Canadian rowers, at the 1867 World Championships.
Joseph Tyrrell	1992	Geologist and cartographer Joseph Tyrrell discovers a plethora of dinosaur bones in Alberta (see Royal Tyrrell Museum of Palaeontology).
Basketball	1992	Sports coach James Naismith's invention of basketball is featured.
Joseph Casavant	1992	Joseph Casavant, world-renowned organ maker is featured.
Emily Carr	1992	The art of Emily Carr is featured.
Soddie	1991	Prairie settlers build a house of sod (see Addison Sod House).
Midwife	1992	A look at the importance of midwives in early Canada.
Saguenay Fire	1992	The 1870 fire in Saguenay is featured.
Sandford Fleming	1990	Engineer and inventor Sandford Fleming develops the system of international standard time.
Nitro	1990	A young Chinese Canadian risks his life to set a dangerous nitroglycerine charge while helping to build the Canadian Pacific Railway in the 1880s.
Jennie Trout	1991	Jennie Trout becomes Canada's first woman doctor.
Rural Teacher	1992	Teacher Kate Henderson sways school trustees to embrace new methods, and the event is represented in the famous painting by Robert Harris, A Meeting of the School Trustees (see image at top).
Louis Riel	1991	The achievements and execution of political and spiritual leader Louis Riel are featured.
Sitting Bull	1990	Native American Chief Sitting Bull seeks refuge in Canada (starring Graham Greene as Sitting Bull).
Les Voltigeurs de Québec	1990	The rehearsal for the first performance of O Canada.
Grey Owl	1999	Englishman Archie Belaney (played by Pierce Brosnan) rises to prominence as a notable author and lecturer after he took on the First Nations identity called Grey Owl.
Frontier College	1997	Frontier College educates those away from the urban centres.
Sam Steele	1993	Major-General and police official Sam Steele (portrayed by Alan Scarfe) of the Royal Canadian Mounted Police bars an unruly American (portrayed by Don S. Davis) from entering the Yukon with pistols, despite being threatened at gunpoint.
Emily Murphy	1992	Women's rights activist, jurist, and author Emily Murphy's (played by Kate Nelligan) quest for equal rights for women.
Myrnam Hospital	1995	The town of Myrnam, Alberta forms a non-denominational hospital.
Agnes Macphail	1992	The first woman to be elected to the Canadian House of Commons, Agnes Macphail (portrayed by Diane D'Aquila), fights for penal reform.
Marconi	1990	Inventor Guglielmo Marconi receives the first trans-Atlantic radio signals in Newfoundland and is awarded the Nobel Prize in Physics.
John McCrae	1990	Author, artist and physician during World War I John McCrae pens In Flanders Fields (starring Colm Feore as McCrae).
Halifax Explosion	1991	Train dispatcher Vince Coleman sacrifices his own life to save a train from the Halifax Explosion.
Vimy Ridge	2005	General Arthur Currie prepares his forces for the successful taking of Vimy Ridge in World War I. Cedric Smith appears as General Julian Byng.
Valour Road	1991	Three men from Pine Street in Winnipeg win the Victoria Cross in World War I, and the street's name is changed to Valour Road in their honour.
Winnie	1990	The bear of Canadian soldier Harry Colebourn becomes the inspiration for Winnie the Pooh.
Nellie McClung	1991	Feminist, politician, and social activist Nellie McClung demands the right to vote in Manitoba.
Joseph-Armand Bombardier	1993	Inventor Joseph-Armand Bombardier and the beginnings of his passion for engineering.
J.S. Woodsworth	2003	Author, lecturer and social activist J. S. Woodsworth (played by Colin Fox) convinces Prime Minister William Lyon Mackenzie King to introduce old age pensions.
Superman	1991	Comic book artist Joe Shuster, en route to visit his cousin, Frank Shuster, creates Superman.
Water Pump	1995	Canadian Mennonites devise sustainable agriculture practices that aid the Third World.
La Bolduc	1993	The story of how Mary Travers becomes a famed popular singer in Quebec.
Bluenose	1995	The ship Bluenose, an important Canadian symbol in the 1930s, wins its last race.
Wilder Penfield	1991	How Dr. Wilder Penfield makes important discoveries in neuroscience when a patient smells burnt toast as the initial signal for an epileptic seizure, during the Montreal procedure.
Osborn of Hong Kong	2005	Sgt. Major John Robert Osborn (played by Ted Dykstra) sacrifices his life to protect his men from Japanese forces during the Battle of Hong Kong in World War II, and is posthumously granted the Victoria Cross.
Marion Orr	1997	Female World War II pilot Marion Orr is featured.
Mona Parsons	2005	Mona Parsons (portrayed by Sonja Smits), a partisan World War II Allied agent in the Netherlands escapes execution and later imprisonment by the Nazis and meets her future husband who confirms her nationality to Canadian forces liberating the nation.
Juno Beach	2005	Broadcaster Johnny Lombardi (played by Fabrizio Filippo) entertains his comrades in the field during a respite of the World War II D-Day taking of Juno Beach by Canadian forces.
Andrew Mynarski	2005	Pilot officer Andrew Mynarski (played by Gabriel Hogan) attempts to free his friend from a bomber turret.
Tommy Prince	2005	A eulogy is given for Tommy Prince (portrayed by Thomas King), Canada's most-decorated Aboriginal war veteran.
Home from the Wars	2005	Returning World War II veterans (portrayed by Allan Hawco) successfully agitate for increasing housing assistance.
John Humphrey	1997	Legal scholar, jurist, and human rights advocate John Humphrey drafts the United Nations Universal Declaration of Human Rights.
Jackie Robinson	1997	Baseball player Jackie Robinson joins the Montreal Royals on October 23, 1945.
Lucille Teasdale	2000	Surgeon Lucille Teasdale (played by Marina Orsini) devotes her life to helping the poor in Africa.
Marshall McLuhan	1990	Philosopher of communication theory Marshall McLuhan (played by Cedric Smith) coins the phrases "the medium is the message" and "global village".
Maurice Ruddick	1993	Miner Maurice Ruddick recounts the 1958 Springhill mine disaster.
Nat Taylor	1997	How Nat Taylor invents the multiplex theater.
Pauline Vanier	1995	The achievements of professional diplomats Georges and Pauline Vanier are featured.
Maurice "Rocket" Richard	1997	Hockey player Maurice Richard, portrayed by actor Roy Dupuis, scores five goals and three assists for eight points in a single game. Dupuis reprises the role for the 2005 Maurice Richard biographical film The Rocket.
Stratford	1997	A look back at the beginning of the Stratford Festival of Canada.
Jacques Plante	1991	Jacques Plante becomes the first NHL player to wear a goaltender mask in regular play.
Avro Arrow	1990	The development of the Avro Arrow (this Heritage Minute was made using footage from the 1996 mini-series The Arrow).
Paul Emile Borduas	1995	The art of Paul-Émile Borduas and the Quiet Revolution are featured.
Le Réseau	1993	Engineer Thomas Wardrope Eadie develops the Trans Canada Microwave telecommunications network.
Flags	1990	Lawyer, judge, and politician John Matheson (portrayed by Peter MacNeill) looks at candidates for Canada's new flag.
Expo 67	1997	The planning of the Montreal International and Universal Exposition called Expo 67 is featured.
Inukshuk	1993	An Inuksuk a stone landmark or cairn is built on Baffin Island.
Dextraze in the Congo	2005	Brigadier-General Jacques Dextraze resolves a hostage situation in the Congo with his UN Peacekeeping forces contingent.
Richard Pierpoint	2012	Richard Pierpoint was a formerly enslaved Black Loyalist who, at age 68, enlisted black men to fight in the War of 1812. Captain Runchey's Company of Coloured Men fought in a number of battles in the Niagara region and were instrumental to the war effort.
Queenston Heights	2013	At the Battle of Queenston Heights (October 13, 1812) Mohawk Chief John Norton (portrayed by Billy Merasty), John Brant (portrayed by Meegwun Fairbrother), and 80 Grand River warriors surprised hundreds of advancing American soldiers and skirmished with them for hours until reinforcements arrived and the battle was won. The minute was narrated by Alanis Obomsawin.
Maple Leaf Gardens	2005	Considered one of the "cathedrals" of ice hockey, the construction and history of the Maple Leaf Gardens is featured.
Sir John A. Macdonald	2014	The dominant figure of Canadian Confederation, John A. Macdonald was the first Prime Minister of Canada.
Sir George-Étienne Cartier	2014	George-Étienne Cartier was a dominant figure in the politics of Canada East (now Quebec) overseeing its entry into Confederation.
Winnipeg Falcons	2014	The Winnipeg Falcons were a senior ice hockey team that fought through discrimination and stayed together even through the First World War, on their way to winning the gold medal for Canada at the 1920 Olympics. Narrated by George Stroumboulopoulos and an appearance by actor Jared Keeso. This was the first Heritage Minute segment to extend longer than one minute.
Nursing Sisters	2015	Nursing Sisters commemorates the service and sacrifice of women on the front lines of the First World War through the retelling of a real event from May 1918. It is the story of two of the nearly 3000 trained nurses who served overseas. Narrated by Molly Parker and starring Siobhan Williams.
Terry Fox	2015	Terry Fox inspires the nation with his Marathon of Hope, a cross-country run to raise money for cancer research. The minute was narrated by Lloyd Robertson.
Viola Desmond	2016	The story of Viola Desmond (portrayed by Kandyse McClure), an entrepreneur who challenged segregation in Nova Scotia in the 1940s.
Chanie Wenjack	2016	The story of Chanie "Charlie" Wenjack, whose death sparked the first inquest into the treatment of Indigenous children in Canadian residential schools. Unlike other Heritage Minutes that were narrated by actors, Wenjack's was narrated by his sister, Pearl.
Naskumituwin (Treaty)	2016	The making of Treaty 9 from the perspective of historical witness George Spence, an 18-year-old Cree hunter from Albany, James Bay.
Kenojuak Ashevak	2016	The story of Kenojuak Ashevak, an Inuk artist and a founder member of Cape Dorset's famed printmaking co-op.
Edmonton Grads	2016	The story of the Edmonton Grads, a powerhouse women's basketball team. World Champions for 17 years, the Grads dominated regionally, nationally, and internationally for 25 years beginning in 1915. Dr. James Naismith called them "the finest team to ever step out onto a floor".
"Boat People" Refugees	2017	A family escapes persecution in Vietnam, traveling by boat to a Malaysian refugee camp before finding a new home in Montreal (1980).
Kensington Market	2017	In the first animated Heritage Minute new arrivals to Canada transform a single store as it passes from generation to generation and culture to culture.
Lucy Maud Montgomery	2018	The story of Lucy Maud Montgomery, who became known around the world as author of Anne of Green Gables and 19 other novels, is narrated by The Right Hon. Adrienne Clarkson.
Jim Egan	2018	The story of Jim Egan, who actively writes letters and articles in magazines and newspapers to advocate for equal rights and criticize the misunderstood and inaccurate perception of lesbian and gay people from 1949 to 1964. His case in 1995 became a milestone for LGBT rights in Canada. The minute was narrated by k.d. lang.
Vancouver Asahi	2019	From 1914 to 1941, the Vancouver Asahi were one of the city's most dominant amateur baseball teams, winning multiple league titles in Vancouver and along the Northwest Coast, until the team was scattered as they were interned during World War II. The short was narrated by Kaye Kaminishi, the sole surviving member of the team, and writer Joy Kogawa. In addition to English and French versions of the minute, a Japanese version was also released.
D-Day	2019	On June 6, 1944, Canadian Forces landed on Juno Beach. D-Day, as this day would become known, was the largest amphibious invasion of all time, led to the liberation of France, and marked the beginning of the end of the Second World War. This Heritage Minute tells the story of 47-year-old Major Archie MacNaughton, a First World War veteran and leader of the North Shore (New Brunswick) Regiment's "A" Company. The story is a tribute to the Canadian soldiers who fought on D-Day – ordinary people in extraordinary circumstances. Narrated by Sonja Smits and Peter Mansbridge providing end narration for the minute.
Acadian Deportation	2019	The Acadians are descendants of early French settlers who arrived in Nova Scotia in 1604 and built a distinct culture and society over generations. Their peaceful existence was uprooted in 1755 when over 10,000 Acadians were ripped from their homeland to ensure British rule in North America.
Liberation of the Netherlands	2020	Between 1944 and 1945, Canadian armed forces were on their way to liberate the Netherlands from Nazi Germany, who was occupying the country. The story is told through the eyes of Canadian Lieutenant Wilf Gildersleeve of the Seaforth Highlanders and of Marguerite Blaisse, a Dutch citizen, who met and later after the war, moved to Vancouver to live together. The end narration was provided by Peter Mansbridge. Another version of the minute was also released with Dutch subtitles.
Elsie MacGill	2020	Elsie MacGill was the world's first female aeronautical engineer and Canada's first practicing woman engineer. She oversaw Canada's production of Hawker Hurricane aircraft at the Canadian Car & Foundry factory during the Second World War. Hawker Hurricanes were one of the main fighters flown by Canadian and Allied airmen in the Battle of Britain. This Heritage Minute follows Elsie MacGill in her role as chief engineer overseeing the production of these instrumental aircraft. The minute was narrated by Nobel Prize in Physics recipient Donna Strickland.
Oscar Peterson	2021	Oscar Peterson was a jazz pianist who grew up in the Montreal neighbourhood of Little Burgundy. In his over 60-year career, he released over 200 recordings, won seven Grammy Awards, and received numerous other awards and honours. Contemporary jazz pianist Thompson Egbo-Egbo portrays the young Peterson early in his career, with footage of Peterson himself representing his later life.
The Discovery of Insulin	2021	Starting in 1921, a team of scientists led by Frederick Banting and Charles Best at the University of Toronto isolated insulin, and in 1922 successfully used it to treat Type 1 diabetes for the first time. The minute was narrated by actor Victor Garber.
Chloe Cooley	2022	Chloe Cooley, an enslaved Black woman in Upper Canada in 1793, engaged in acts of resistance against estate owner Adam Vrooman. As rumours of abolition circulated, Vrooman and his men kidnapped Chloe on March 14 and violently forced her onto a boat to the United States, where Vrooman hoped to profit from selling Chloe. Witnesses, including the free man Peter Martin, later testified to Chloe's resistance in the face of her violent removal, leading to Canada's first legislation limiting slavery. Despite this, slavery in Canada was not abolished until 1834. End narration was provided by The Hon. Jean Augustine.
Tom Longboat	2022	Onondaga long-distance runner Tom Longboat (whose name Gagwe꞉gih means "everything") was one of the most celebrated athletes of the early 20th century and has inspired generations of athletes. After running away from the Mohawk Institute Residential School in Brantford, Ontario, in 1900, he continued running his whole life. Despite the racism he faced as an Indigenous athlete, Tom won many races, including his record-breaking win at the 1907 Boston Marathon, making him a household name. In the Heritage Minute, while Longboat is a dispatch carrier during the First World War, an officer he is escorting struggles to keep up and complains, "Who do you think I am? Tom Longboat?"— Tom replies, "No, Sir… I am" and continues to run. Tom Longboat was portrayed by Joshua Odjick as an adult, Sladen Peltier as young Tom Longboat, and the voice of Tom Longboat was performed by Gary Farmer.
Jackie Shane	2022	Singer Jackie Shane was a key figure in the 1960s Toronto Sound, and an important pioneer transgender performer. Narrated by Beverly Glenn-Copeland.
Paldi	2023	Bishan Kaur describes her arrival in Canada in 1927 to join her husband, lumber entrepreneur Mayo Singh, in the mill town of Paldi, in an era of uncertainty for Asian Canadians. In the face of anti-Asian sentiments and policies, the Mayo Lumber Company was established by Sikh lumbermen in 1917 and employed South Asian, Chinese, Japanese, and white Canadian workers. The town became known as a welcoming and inclusive home to people of all backgrounds, and mill workers and their families called Paldi home until the 1980s. Today, the historic site of the Paldi gurdwara remains a symbol of this inclusive, multicultural community.
Mary "Bonnie" Baker	2023	In 1952, celebrity panelists on game show What's My Line? attempt to guess the extraordinary profession of guest Mary "Bonnie" Baker (portrayed by Michelle Mylett), with panelist Dorothy Kilgallen correctly guessing Baker is a professional baseball player. Born in Regina, Saskatchewan, Baker was one of 68 Canadian players in the All-American Girls Professional Baseball League and debuted as a catcher for the South Bend Blue Sox in 1943, where she remained until 1949. The minute is narrated by Baker's daughter, Maureen "Chick" Baker.
Norman Kwong	2024	Norman Kwong (portrayed by Patrick Kwok-Choon), born in Calgary in 1929, he began his professional football career one year after the end of the Chinese Exclusion Act, when Chinese Canadians were granted the right to vote in federal elections, and became the first CFL player of Chinese heritage. Following his football career and winning four Grey Cups, he became a co-owner of the Calgary Flames hockey team, and he would become lieutenant-governor of Alberta in 2005. The minute was narrated by actor Andrew Phung.
Mary Riter Hamilton	2024	Mary Riter Hamilton (portrayed by Megan Follows), a Canadian painter, captures powerful imagery in her paintings of the aftermath of the First World War.
Edwin Baker	2024	Edwin Baker (portrayed by legally blind actor Bruce Horak), is blinded by a sniper's bullet. With the help of Sir Arthur Pearson, he becomes self-reliant and takes what he learns to helps others in Canada, culminating in co-founding the Canadian National Institute for the Blind. The minute was narrated by Paralympic swimmer Donovan Tildesley, who also portrays a blind veteran.
Bora Laskin	2025	In 1973, Bora Laskin (portrayed by Victor Garber) argues in favour of the appeal of a woman's right to a farm and that there is no just reason that a wife's contribution to a farm should be any less significant than the husband. In the Great Depression, Laskin had struggled to find work after being called to bar and faced rampant antisemitism in Toronto in the 1930s. He eventually became the first Jewish Chief Justice of the Supreme Court of Canada. Maintaining an extensive career which spanned many notable cases, Laskin was known as an innovative educator and the first academic on the Supreme Court. The minute was narrated by The Right Hon. Beverley McLachlin, a former Chief Justice of the Supreme Court of Canada, in English and by Yves Fortier, a former Canadian Ambassador to the United Nations and noted lawyer and diplomat, in French.
Anne Innis Dagg	2025	After developing a lifelong interest in giraffes as a child, Dr. Anne Innis Dagg travelled to South Africa to study giraffes, where she encountered challenges as an unmarried woman travelling alone. Her research would make her leading authority on giraffes. Despite being well-qualified, Dagg struggled to receive a permanent teaching position and later advocated for gender equality, particularly in academia. The minute was narrated by Dagg's daughter, Mary Dagg.
Gander and 9/11	2026	On September 11, 2001, multiple flights were diverted into Canada as a result of the September 11 attacks where U.S. Airspace was closed off to oncoming flights. This led to the mayor of Gander, portrayed by Rick Mercer, coordinating with the town's residents to help stranded passengers with the support they needed.
Captain Jonathan Snyder	2026	On June 4, 2008, during a patrol as company advisor to the Afghan National Army, Captain Jonathan Snyder's company was ambushed by Taliban forces. With little chance of survival, Snyder successfully led his forces through the ambush allowing the Afghan soldiers to retrieve their wounded and dead. For his bravery Captain Snyder, portrayed by Marshall Williams, was awarded the Star of Military Valour. Snyder died days later on June 7, having never received his medal. The end narration for the minute was provided by General (Ret’d) Rick Hillier.

== Parodies ==
- The Canadian sketch comedy shows This Hour Has 22 Minutes, The Rick Mercer Report, Royal Canadian Air Farce, and Rock et Belles Oreilles, have parodied the Heritage Minute format in sketches, or used the format for satire.
- The Comedy Network has aired short parodies titled "Sacrilege Moments".
- Canadian rapper Classified parodied the Heritage Minute in his music video for the song "O Canada..."
- Canadian cartoonist Kate Beaton adapted the Heritage Minute format in a comic about Margaret Trudeau, wife of former Canadian Prime Minister Pierre Trudeau.
- In 2007, the Internet comedy group LoadingReadyRun celebrated Canada Day by telling the story of the Heritage Minutes in the format of a Heritage Minute.
- In the second episode of season 1 of Canada's Drag Race, the main challenge is based on parodying Heritage Minutes as "Her-itage Moments"; the parodied ads were the one on Nellie McClung and the suffragist movement in Manitoba, and the one about Dr. Wilder Penfield's advances in neuroscience research.

== See also ==
- Bicentennial Minutes, similar 1970s series about the American Revolution
- Canadian folklore
- Canada: A People's History
- Events of National Historic Significance
- The Greatest Canadian
- Hinterland Who's Who
- National Historic Sites of Canada
- Persons of National Historic Significance
- The Log Driver's Waltz
