= Norman Kirby =

Norman Kirby may refer to:

- Norman Kirby (footballer) (1908-1977), English footballer, mainly for Swindon Town, see List of Bury F.C. players (1–24 appearances)
- Norm Kirby (1925-2021), Canadian veteran
