= History of education in Canada =

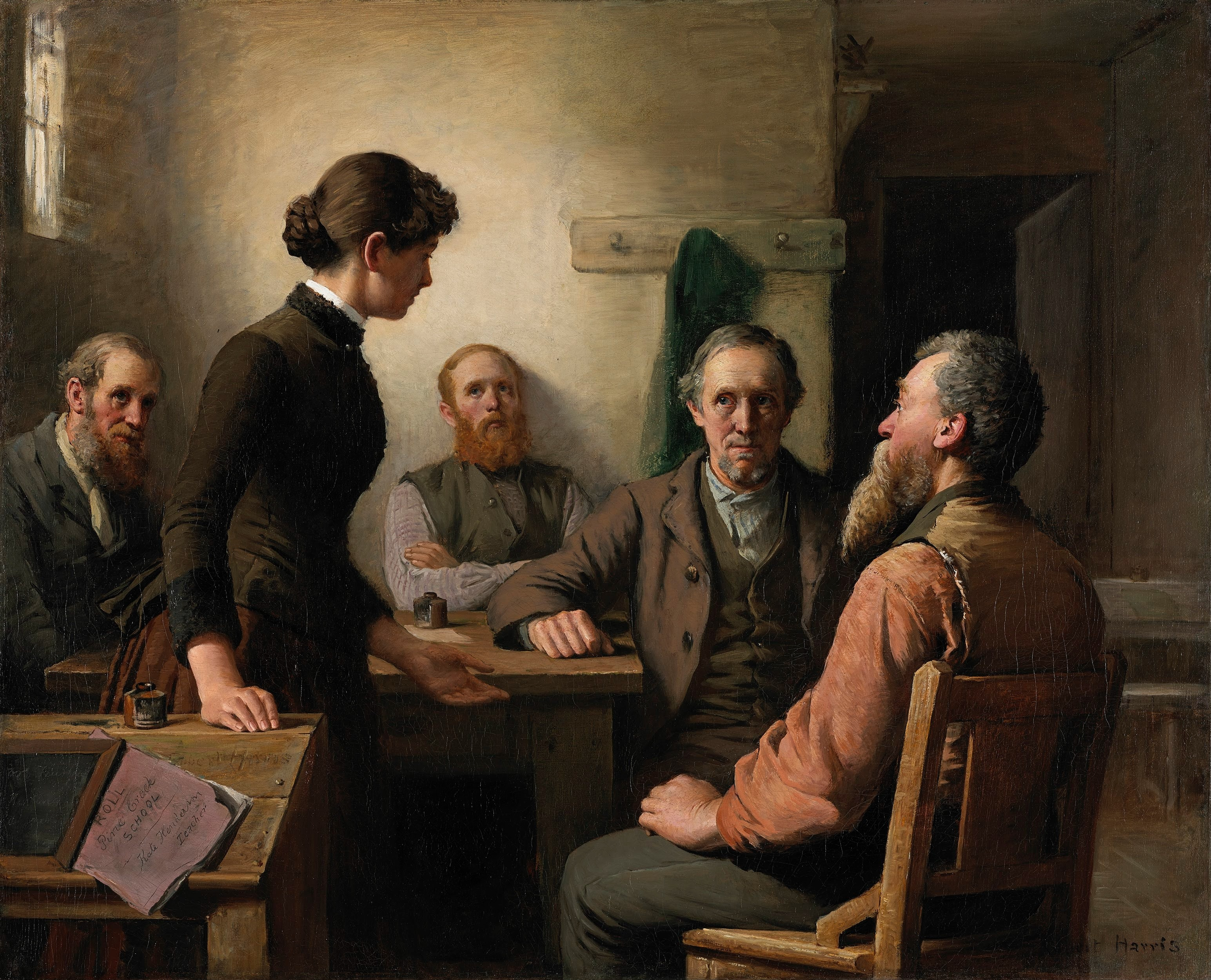
Canadian education pioneer Kate Henderson is portrayed in A Meeting of the School Trustees by painter Robert Harris (1885)

The history of education in Canada covers schooling from elementary through university, the ideas of educators, and the policies of national and provincial governments. In 1957, Charles Phillips divided the history of public schooling in Canada into four periods or stages:

The first was characterized by church-controlled education and lasted from the early 1700s through to the mid 1800s. Stage two, which extended to the late 1800s, saw the introduction of more centralized authority, universal free education, and taxation for schooling at the local level. Stage three, the early 1900s, saw the development of provincial departments of education, a more consistent curriculum, better trained teachers and the start of provincial government financial support for schools. The fourth stage, since the Second World War, has been characterized by the appointment of Ministers of Education in each provincial government and a far greater involvement of government in all aspects of education.

For more information about the residential school abuse in Canadian schools, see Education in Canada and Canadian Indian residential school system.

== Religious schools ==
The first schools in New France were operated by the Catholic church (as were schools in France itself). In the early nineteenth century the colonial governments moved to set up publicly funded education systems. Protestants and Catholics were deeply divided over how religious and moral education should be delivered. In Upper Canada the Catholic minority rejected the Protestant practice of Biblical study in schools, while in Lower Canada the Protestant minority objected to the education system instilling Roman Catholic dogma. Thus in both these areas two schools systems were established, a Catholic and a Protestant.

The first organizational outline for education in Canada was written by Egerton Ryerson in the year 1847. His aim was to promote British culture in Upper Canada, as well as preserve it in light of its powerful neighbours. He did this in a report titled Report on a system of public elementary instruction for Upper Canada

Upon Confederation these schools systems were enshrined in the British North America Act (BNA), 1867. Both Quebec and Ontario were required by section 93 of the BNA Act to safeguard existing educational rights and privileges of the Protestant and Catholic minorities. Thus, separate Catholic schools and school boards were permitted in Ontario. However, neither province had a constitutional requirement to protect its French- or English-speaking minority. Toronto was formally established as Ontario's provincial capital at this time.

British Columbia established a non-sectarian school system in 1872.

In the three Maritime provinces, schools were mainly Protestant, and a single Protestant oriented school system was established in each of them. In Newfoundland there was not only the Catholic/Protestant split, but also deep divisions between Protestant sects, and nine separate schools systems were set up, one catering to each major denomination. Eventually the major Protestant boards merged into an integrated school system.

Over time, the originally Protestant school boards of English Canada, known as the public schools, became increasingly secularized as Canadians came to believe in the separation of Church and state, and the main boards became secular ones. In Ontario all overt religiosity was removed from the public school system in 1990. In two provinces the sectarian education systems have recently been eliminated through constitutional change. Newfoundland and Labrador eliminated its tri-denominational Catholic-Protestant-Pentecostal system after two referendums. In Quebec the Catholic/Protestant divide was replaced with a French language/English language one.

Religious colleges are attached to numerous universities.

=== Language war and school crisis in Ontario ===
In Ontario in 1912, the Conservative government of Sir James P. Whitney issued Regulation 17 which severely limited the availability of French-language schooling to the province's French-speaking minority. French could only be used in the first two years of schooling, and then only English was allowed. Few of the teachers at these schools were fluent in English, so they had to shut down.

French-Canadians—growing rapidly in number in eastern Ontario because of migration, reacted with outrage, journalist Henri Bourassa denouncing the "Prussians of Ontario"—a stinging rebuke since Canada was at war with Prussia and Germany at the time. It was one of the key reasons the Francophones turned away from the war effort in 1915 and refused to enlist. Ontario's Catholics were led by the Irish, who united with the Protestants in opposing French schools.

Regulation 17 was eventually repealed in 1927.

== Prairies ==
The three Prairie provinces adopted a system based on Ontario's with a dominant Protestant system, and smaller Catholic ones.

=== Manitoba Schools Question ===
In 1891, Manitoba moved to eliminate the Catholic board, sparking the Manitoba Schools Question. It demonstrated the deep divergence of cultural, religious and language values and became an issue of national importance. The Catholic Franco-Manitobains had been guaranteed a state-supported separate school system in the original constitution of Manitoba, such that their children would be taught in French. However a grassroots political movement among English Protestants from 1888 to 1890 demanded the end of French schools. In 1890, the Manitoba legislature passed a law removing funding for French Catholic schools. The French Catholic minority asked the federal government for support; however, the Orange Order and other anti-Catholic forces mobilized nationwide to oppose them. The federal Conservatives proposed remedial legislation to override Manitoba, but they were blocked by the Liberals, led by Wilfrid Laurier, who opposed the remedial legislation because of his belief in provincial rights. The Manitoba Schools issue became an issue in the Canadian federal election of 1896, where it worked against the Conservatives and helped elect the Liberals. As Prime Minister, Laurier implemented a compromise stating that Catholics in Manitoba could have their own religious instruction for 30 minutes at the end of the day if there were enough students to warrant it, implemented on a school-by-school basis.

=== Alberta ===
The Catholic archbishop of Edmonton, Henry Joseph O'Leary had a considerable impact on the city's Catholic sectors, and his efforts reflect many of the challenges facing the Catholic Church at that time. During the 1920s, O'Leary favored his fellow Irish and drastically reduced the influence of French Catholic clergy in his archdiocese and replaced them with Anglophone priests. He helped to assimilate Ukrainian Catholic immigrants into the stricter Roman Catholic traditions, extended the viability of Edmonton's separate Catholic school system, and established both a Catholic college at the University of Alberta and a seminary in Edmonton.

In 1892 Alberta adopted the Ontario schools model, emphasizing state-run institutions that stressed the English language, English history and English customs. The Catholic community, under the control of Irish, joined the British Protestant community in these new policies, despite the complaints of the French-Canadian minority. Predominantly francophone communities in Alberta maintained some control of local schools by electing trustees sympathetic to French language and culture. Such groups as the Association Canadienne-Française de l'Alberta expected trustees to implement their own cultural agenda. An additional problem francophone communities faced was the constant shortage of qualified francophone teachers during 1908–35; the majority of those hired left their positions after only a few years of service. After 1940 school consolidation largely ignored the language and culture issues of francophones.

=== Canadianization of immigrants ===
After 1870 numerous non-Anglophone immigrants arrived from Europe, including Germans, Ukrainians, Scandinavians and many others. Large numbers headed to the attractive free farms in the Prairie Provinces. Education was a central factor in their assimilation into Canadian culture and society. An important indicator of assimilation was the use of English; the children of all immigrant groups showed a strong preference in favour of speaking English, regardless of their parents' language. From 1900 to 1930, the governments of the Prairie Provinces faced the formidable task of transforming the ethnically and linguistically diverse immigrant population into loyal and true Canadians. Many officials believed language assimilation by children would be the key to Canadianization. However, there was opposition to the direct method of English teaching from some immigrant spokesmen. English-language usage in playground games often proved an effective device, and was systematically used. The elementary schools especially in rural Alberta played a central role in the acculturation of the immigrants and their children, providing, according to Prokop, a community character that created a distinctive feature of Canadian schools glaringly missing in the European school tradition.

== Academic versus vocational education ==
Historic educational ideals in Canada, contrasted to the United States, have been more elitist, with an emphasis on training church and political elites along British lines. In 1960, for example 9.2 percent of Canadians aged 20 to 24 were enrolled in higher education, compared to 30.2 percent in the United States. Even at the secondary level, enrollments were higher in the United States. Furthermore, the United States has long led in vocational, technical and professional education, while the Canadian schools resist their inclusion. According to research by Lawrence Downey:

Canadians, as a group, assigned considerably higher priority than did Americans to knowledge, scholarly attitudes, creative skills, aesthetic appreciation, and morality, as outcomes of schooling. Americans emphasized physical development, citizenship, patriotism, social skills, and family living much more than did Canadians.

Ivor F. Goodson and Ian R. Dowbiggin have explored the battle over vocational education in London, Ontario, in the 1900-1930 era, a time when American cities were rapidly expanding their vocational offerings. The London Technical and Commercial High School came under heavy attack from the city's social and business elite, which saw the school as a threat to the budget of the city's only academic high school, London Collegiate Institute.

== Educational theory ==
Ontario took the lead in the early 20th century in developing a theoretical approach to education that was not only taught in universities, but largely shaped government policies in Ontario, and in other provinces as well. The central theme was that schooling could be approached in scientific fashion.

== Credentialism in early education ==
The training required to become a teacher formalized in the 1840s. Until this point there were few schools, and teachers would be deemed qualified upon availability more so than intellect and ability. At this point they started introducing qualifications aimed at instructing teachers in how to best do their job. The conditions for teachers at this time were quite poor. They had low wages and poor working conditions. Their salaries ranged from 400 to 1400 for women, or 600–2100 for men. Accounting for inflation, that would be approximately $8000 for women, or $10,000 for men by today's standards. Along with the low wages, the teachers would be responsible for everything in the school. This included janitorial duties, and administrative tasks on top of teaching the students. This made teaching a quite difficult and unappealing job. The first union for teachers was created in 1920, The Canadian Teachers Confederation (CTF). This allowed for teachers to unify with each other, as well as advocate for increased workplace rights.
