= Moncrieff Williamson =

Canadian museum director (1915–1963)

Moncrieff Willliamson CM RCA
- Born: Grahame Moncrieff Willliamson; November 23, 1915; East Linton, Scotland
- Died: August 5, 1996 (aged 80); Edmonton, Alberta
- Education: Edinburgh College of Art
- Known for: arts administrator, curator, author, educator
- Spouse: Pamela Upton Fanshawe (Pam) (m. 1948, d. 1996)
- Awards: Order of Canada

Moncrieff Willliamson (Crieff) (November 23, 1915 – August 12, 1996) was a Canadian gallery director, curator, art historian and author of biographies, a mystery and poetry as well as an educator, teaching fine art at universities and lecturing.

== Career ==
Williamson was born in East Linton, Scotland and spent his early youth in Edinburgh. After an education in Scotland and Belgium, Williamson graduated from the Edinburgh College of Art and worked in documentary and feature films in the United Kingdom and then with the art exhibitions bureau in London, England (now called the Federation of British artists), eventually becoming its director around 1947. At the same time, he wrote for the art news agency in the U.K., and worked as a freelance writer and educator.

In 1940, he served in the British Air Commission in the Communications section in Washington and in 1943, transferred to the British Army Intelligence Corps with which he served in England, Belgium, and Germany. After the war, he was manager of an art gallery in London, then director of the art exhibitions bureau and organized exhibitions which circulated throughout the U.K.

In 1957, he emigrated to Canada and worked as a curator at the Art Gallery of Greater Victoria and began to organize the art department of the Glenbow Foundation in Calgary. He became director of the art department of the Glenbow Foundation from 1960 to 1964 and then returned to the Art Gallery of Greater Victoria and taught Fine Art at the University of Victoria. From 1964 to 1982, he was director of the Confederation Centre Art Gallery in Charlottetown, P.E.I. At the same time, he taught at the Prince of Wales College and at the University of Prince Edward Island.

At the Confederation Centre Art Gallery and Museum, as the founding director, he began the collection. Since the building was a National Monument to the Fathers of Confederation, he made the collection national in scope, including a representation of pre- and post-confederation Canadian art and Canadian contemporary arts and crafts. He also encouraged the development of art in Prince Edward Island and the Atlantic Provinces.

His collection choices were widely diverse, ranging from the vast collection of works and archival material related to Robert Harris to crafts, a collection of British porcelain or L. M. Montgomery’s manuscripts. He became in time the first scholar to study Harris's career and organized the Contemporary Canadian Crafts exhibition for Expo '67. When he retired in 1982 there were approximately 14,000 objects in the collection.

He also was active as a curator of many exhibitions of Canadian art from shows chosen by artists to shows of historical art. He saw the gallery as a way of promoting Island art and culture. After he retired, the gallery made him Director Emeritus and, in 1991, named one of its galleries for him.

In 1983, he wrote a mystery novel, "Death in the picture: a Cyrus Finnegan mystery". In 1995, he and his wife moved to Edmonton to live with his son, Timothy and his wife, where both Crieff and Pam died in 1996.

He is regarded as "one of the busiest and most gregarious gallery directors" in Canada.

== Selected honours and awards ==
- Order of Canada (1976);
- Fellow of the Royal Society of Arts;
- Gold medallist of the Royal Canadian Academy of Arts;
- Diplome d’honneur of the Canadian Conference of the Arts (1975);
- Canadian Centennial Medal, 1967;
- Queen's Silver Jubilee Medal, 1988;
- Honorary doctorate, University of Prince Edward Island (1972);
- President, Canadian Art Museum Directors Organization, 1971-1973;
- Honorary Life Member of the Association of Art Museum Directors in the U.S.;
- Gold Medal, Glenbow Museum Acquisition Society, 1986;
- The Confederation Centre Art Gallery named one of its galleries for him (1991).

== Selected publications ==
- "Fluid Idol", 1952;
- "Four Poems", 1945;
- Canadian Fine Crafts: an exhibition collected by Moncrieff Williamson for the Canadian Government pavilion, Expo 67 (Montreal, Ottawa: Queen's Printer, 1967);
- "Robert Harris, An Unconventional Biography" (Toronto and Montreal, McClelland and Stewart, 1970);
- "Robert Harris (1849–1919)" (National Gallery of Canada, 1973);
- "Island painter: the life of Robert Harris (1849–1919)" (Charlottetown, 1983);
- "Death in the Picture: a Cyrus Finnegan mystery" (Markham: PaperJacks, 1983, c1982);
- "The Inward Garden" (P.E.I., Cross Keys Publishing, 1990);
- "Robert Harris", Dictionary of Canadian Biography, vol. 14, University of Toronto/Université Laval, 2003–.

== Legacy ==
In 2014, the Confederation Centre Art Gallery in Charlottetown organized Acquired in 1964, curated by Cathy Busby. It displayed the collection that Williamson, acquired ahead of the opening of the gallery in 1964 and sheds light on his acquisition choices. In 2017, Kevin Rice, the gallery director, and Pan Wendt, the curator, organized an exhibition titled RE:collection, using the collection in novel and different ways. The exhibition was accompanied by a book catalogue they authored.
