= Thompson Egbo-Egbo =

Canadian musician

- Egbo-Egbo in 2026

Thompson Egbo-Egbo is a Canadian jazz pianist, composer and educator from Toronto, Ontario.

== Background ==
Born in Nigeria, he emigrated to Canada with his family in childhood. After struggling in school, his mother enrolled him in music classes at Toronto's Dixon Hall.

In 1995, at the age of 11, he was featured in a television commercial for the Toronto chapter of the United Way of Canada. In the same year, he also participated in a summer music camp organized by the Canadian Opera Company.

He took further music classes at the Regent Park School of Music in the city's Regent Park neighbourhood, while attending high school at Danforth Collegiate and Technical Institute.

Following high school he studied jazz performance at Humber College, and music production and design at the Berklee College of Music.

== Career ==
By the early 2000s he was beginning to perform in Toronto jazz clubs. In 2005 he performed at the Toronto Jazz Festival for the first time. He created his own Thompson Egbo-Egbo Trio in 2012, and released his debut album Short Stories in 2014.

He performs a mixture of original compositions, jazz standards and jazz-based rearrangements of popular music. Of his inclusion of pop, rock and world music elements into his repertoire, he has stated that “I don't see it as making concessions to the pop world or any other genre. We all have unlimited access to every kind of music now, so I feel I'm a position to add whatever elements I'm interested in to my sound."

He has also worked in theatre, including serving as music director for productions of Da Kink in My Hair in the 2000s, composing original music for the Canadian Contemporary Dance Theatre, and performing in the Soulpepper Theatre Company's 88Keys in 2019.

In 2021 he portrayed the young Oscar Peterson in a Heritage Minute about Peterson's life. In June 2025, he was one of the performers at a special Massey Hall tribute show celebrating the 100th anniversary of Peterson's birth, and he performed at the annual Canada Day festival on the LeBreton Flats in Ottawa on July 1, in the afternoon lineup alongside Amanda Marshall, Garou, Rafaëlle Roy and Alli Walker.

Citing the importance of giving back to the community that helped him, he has remained active as a board member and supporter of both Dixon Hall and the Regent Park Music School, and created his own Thompson T. Egbo-Egbo Arts Foundation to support children's arts education programs.

== Discography ==
- Short Stories - 2014
- A New Standard - 2018
- The Offering - 2019
- What Remains - 2022
- Oddly Familiar, Vol. 1 - 2022
- Oddly Familiar, Vol. 2 - 2024
