= Confederation Centre Art Gallery =

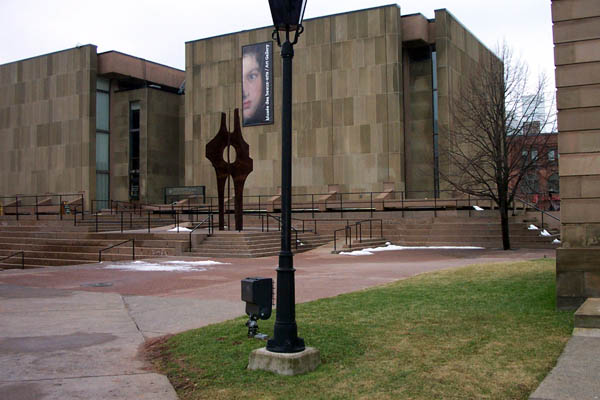
- Exterior of the Confederation Centre Art Gallery

- Location in Prince Edward Island
- Established: 1964; 62 years ago
- Location: 145 Richmond Street, Charlottetown, Prince Edward Island, Canada
- Coordinates: 46.2343072°N 63.1271088°W
- Type: Art museum
- Director: Kevin Rice
- Curator: Pan Wendt
- Architect: Affleck, Desbarats, Dimakopoulos, Lebensold, and Sise
- Website: confederationcentre.com/whats-on/categories/art-gallery/

The Confederation Centre Art Gallery (CCAG; French: Musée d’art du Centre de la Confédération) is an art museum that forms a part of the Confederation Centre of the Arts in Charlottetown, Prince Edward Island, Canada. The art museum pavilion forms the northeast portion of the Confederation Centre of the Arts complex, and includes seven exhibition rooms that equal 3,250 square metres (35,000 sq ft) of space.

The art museum was opened in honour of the Fathers of Confederation, in October 1964, along with the rest of the Confederation Centre of the Arts. The art museum's permanent collection includes over 17,000 works, primarily from Canadian artists. Its exhibition spaces feature contemporary and historical exhibitions year-round, as well as special events, public lectures, and educational programming.

== History ==
The Confederation Centre of the Arts was built from 1963 to 1964 in order to commemorate the Fathers of Confederation. Built in a Brutalist style by Montreal firm Affleck, Desbarats, Lebensold, Michaud & Sise, it was seen as "prototype for the Centennial building program, inciting other provinces and cities to start thinking of a more permanent monument of the year". The federal government provided C$2.8 million, while the provincial governments provided C$0.15 for each resident in their respective provinces. On 6 October 1964, the 100th anniversary of the Charlottetown Conference, the Confederation Centre of the Arts was opened by Queen Elizabeth II. The Confederation Centre of the Arts included the Confederation Centre Art Gallery, and several venues for the performing arts. The centre formally belongs to the federal and provincial governments of Canada, although the Government of Prince Edward Island acts as its custodian.

Following an investigation into several works in its permanent collection in the mid-2010s, the museum corrected the attribution to several works to its correct painter, Caroline Louisa Daly. A two-year investigation into the matter by the museum was launched in 2014 shortly after it was informed of the issue by a great-grandchild of Daly, who recognized her signature on one of the works. Following the correction, the museum organized an exhibition to exhibit works by Daly.

== Architecture ==
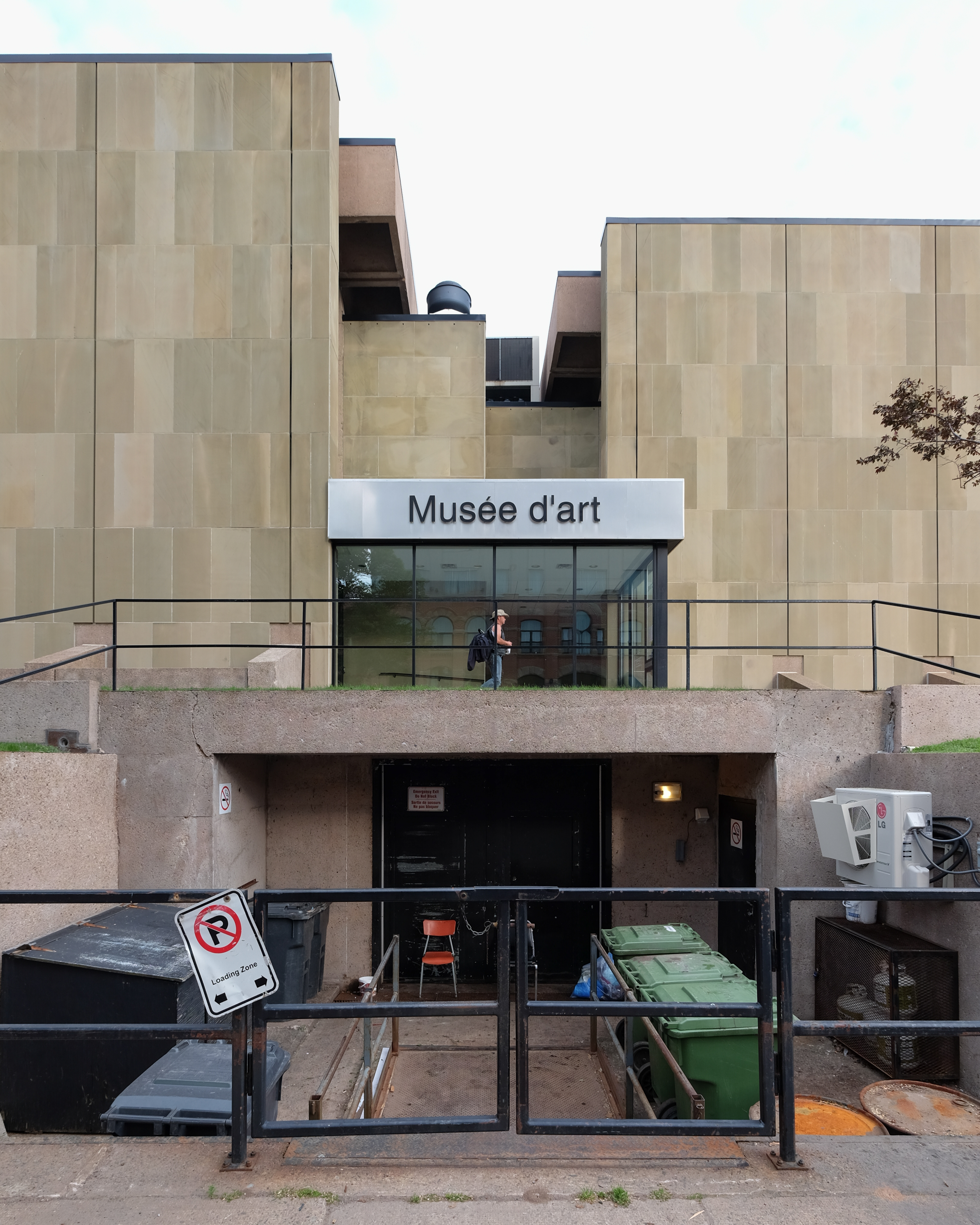
The exterior entrance is one of two access points into the art museum

The Confederation Centre Art Gallery building is located in the central business district of Charlottetown, and is situated west of Province House. The art museum forms a part of the larger Confederation Centre of the Arts building complex, which also contains a public library, restaurant, a 1,102-seat theatre for the performing arts, two studio theatres, and several event venues. Designed by Affleck, Desbarats, Dimakopoulos, Lebensold, and Sise, the Brutalist style structure began construction in 1963, and was completed in 1964. Designed by Dimitri Dimakopoulos, the exterior of the structure features a reinforced concrete frame, faced with a continuous wall of smooth sandstone. On 30 June 2003, the entire structure was designated as a National Historic Site of Canada.

The building is made of four constituent pavilions which together form a single building; however their exteriors were designed to be visually distinct from one another, giving the appearance that the pavilions are separate buildings. Three of these pavilions are situated in a U-shape around a fourth "Memorial Hall" pavilion; with the Confederation Centre Art Gallery located in the northeast pavilion of the U-shaped building complex.

The art gallery pavilion is three storeys, and has a low geometric massing that is used throughout the entire structure. It includes seven exhibition rooms, which comprise over 3,250 square metres (35,000 sq ft), an art education facility named The Schurman Family Studio, a contemporary outdoor sculpture court, a conservation lab, a preparation workshop, administrative offices, and temporary and permanent collection storage rooms. There are two access points for the art museum pavilion, an entrance to the south that provides access from the inside the other pavilions of the Confederation Centre of the Arts, and an entrance to the north that provides access from the outside.

== Permanent collection ==
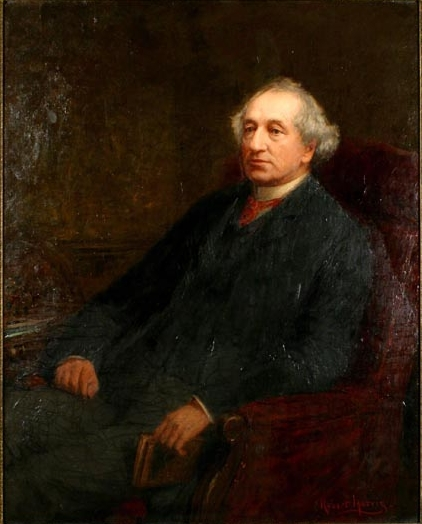
The Rt. Hon. Sir John A. Macdonald by Robert Harris, 1890. The work is one of a number of works in the museum's permanent collection.

As of June 2017, the art museum's permanent collection includes over 17,000 works by Canadian artists. The permanent collection was begun by founding director, Moncrieff Williamson, in 1964, and has a mandate to develop exhibit Canadian visual arts, with and its collection reflect on Canadian identity and the origin and evolution of the country. Works in the collection were either directly purchased from the art museum, bequeathed to, or donated to the art museum.

The collection includes digital media presentations, drawings, installation art, painting, photography, printmaking, sculptures. Most of the museum's holdings are works of contemporary art; although its collection does include works from the 19th and early 20th centuries, including works by Fanny Amelia Bayfield, Kathleen Daly, Cornelius Krieghoff, and George Pepper. The museum's collection includes specialized areas, like the Confederation Mural Collection, which includes works by Jean Paul Lemieux, and Jane Ash Poitras. The collection also includes works by Indigenous Canadians, including Robert Houle.

The museum's permanent collection also includes a specialized historical components, featuring a specialized research collection of works by Robert Harris, and the Lucy Maud Montgomery Collection, which includes sixteen novel manuscripts from the author. The Expo 67 Collection of Fine Craft features works made for the 1967 World's Fair.

== See also ==
- List of art museums
- List of museums in Prince Edward Island
