= Mary Alexandra Bell Eastlake =

Canadian artist (1864–1951)

- Born: Mary Alexandra Bell; 1864; Douglas, Canada West
- Died: 1951 (aged 86–87); Ottawa, Ontario
- Known for: Jewelry maker, Painter, Watercolourist
- Spouse: Charles H. Eastlake

Mary Alexandra Bell Eastlake (née Mary Alexandra Bell) (1864, Douglas, Canada West - 1951, Ottawa) was a Canadian painter most notable for her portraits of women and children, as well as a jewelry and enamelwork designer and producer.

== Biography ==
Born in Douglas, Canada West, Bell grew up in Carillon, Canada East (becoming Quebec when she was about 3) and later in Almonte, Ontario. She received her formal art training from Robert Harris at the Art Association of Montreal from 1884 to 1887 and from William Merritt Chase at the Art Students League in New York. She continued her studies in Paris at the Académie Julian and Académie Colarossi between 1891 and 1892. She first exhibited in the Paris Salon in 1889. She was elected an associate of the Royal Canadian Academy of Arts in 1893.

She sought to use contemporary subject matter in her paintings, often interpreting the subject of women and children, and was attentive to light and colour. Among Bell Eastlake's contemporaries, artists such as Mary Cassatt, Helen McNicoll and Laura Muntz Lyall were also known for their depiction of women and children. Curators believe that she may have seen and been influenced by Cassatt's prints when they were exhibited at the Galerie Durand‒Ruel in Paris in 1891.

After meeting Charles Herbert Eastlake, an English painter and director of the Chelsea Polytechnic and marrying him in 1897, she moved to England and devoted time to learning enamelling and metal work for the production of jewelry as an applied art. She exhibited her work at the Palace of Fine Arts at the 1893 World's Columbian Exposition in Chicago, Illinois. One of her pastels, an effect of sunlight through trees, was exhibited at the Salon of 1906. She painted in Sweden, Holland, and Belgium, as well as England and France. In 1927, she had a major show titled Oils, Water Colors and Pastels by Mrs. C.H. Eastlake at the Art Gallery of Toronto (later its name changed to the Art Gallery of Ontario). After the death of her husband, Eastlake returned to Canada in 1939.

The Pastel and the Boston Water Colour Societies made her a member, and besides the Salon, she exhibited at the Royal Academy, Arts and Crafts, and New English Art Club, and at exhibitions in Canada and the United States. Her works are in the collection of the National Gallery of Canada.

== Selected works ==
- Moonrise
- The Village on the Cliff
- Reverie
- Snowy Day in a Canadian Village

== Record sale prices ==
At the Cowley Abbott Auction Artwork from an Important Private Collection - Part II, June 8, 2023, In the Orchard, circa 1895-1897, oil on canvas, 38 x 33.25 ins ( 96.5 x 84.5 cms ), Auction Estimate: $30,000.00 - $50,000.00, realized a price of $168,000.00.
