= 132nd Battalion (North Shore), CEF =

Canadian Military Battalion

The 132nd Battalion (North Shore), CEF was a unit in the Canadian Expeditionary Force during the First World War. Based in Chatham, New Brunswick, the unit began recruiting in late 1915 in North Shore and Northumberland Counties. After sailing to England in October 1916, the battalion was absorbed into the 13th Reserve Battalion on January 28, 1917. The 132nd Battalion (North Shore), CEF had one Officer Commanding: Lieut-Col. G. W. Mersereau.

The 132nd Battalion is perpetuated by The North Shore (New Brunswick) Regiment.

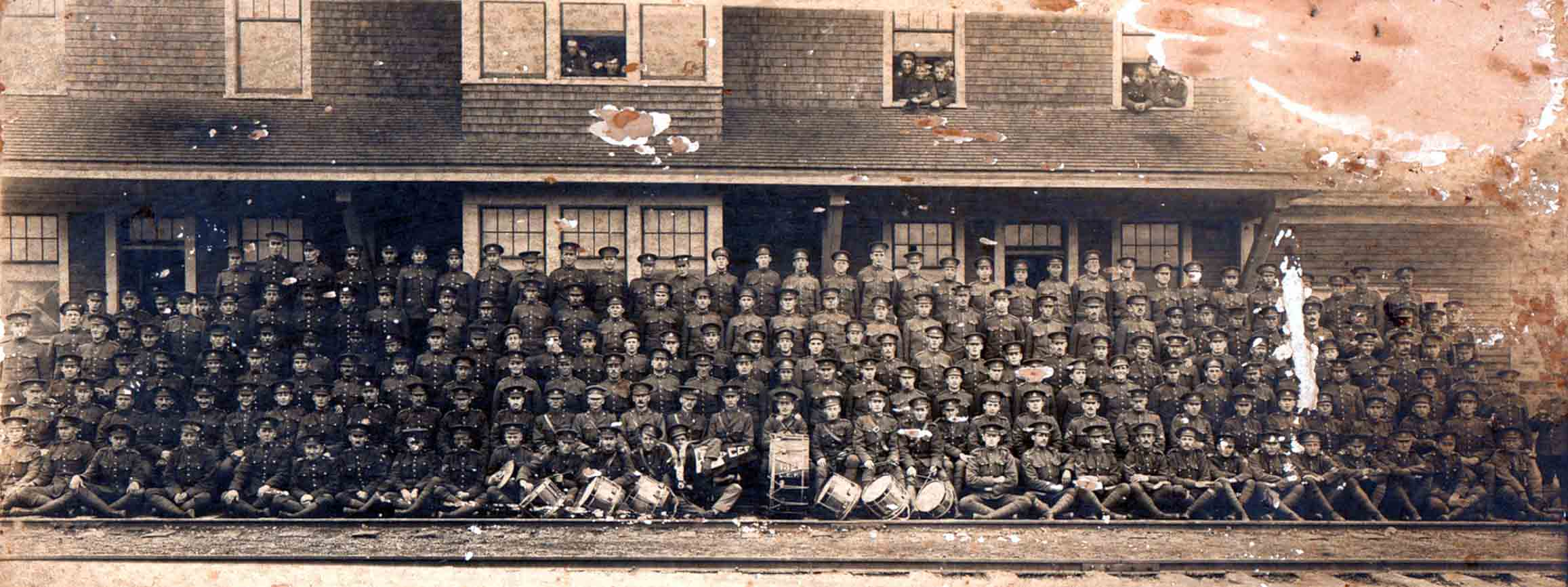
132 off to Valcartier for training

== Notes ==
A former member of the 132nd Battalion, Pte. Benjamin Edward Kaine later served with the 87th Battalion, Manitoba Regiment. Kaine was killed on June 9, 1917. Canadian Virtual Memorial record

A former member of the 132nd Battalion, Pte. Sydney Allen Matchett later served with the 26th Battalion, New Brunswick Regiment. Matchett was killed by a stray bullet while on sentry duty on April 29, 1918. http://www.cwgc.org/find-war-dead/casualty/558031

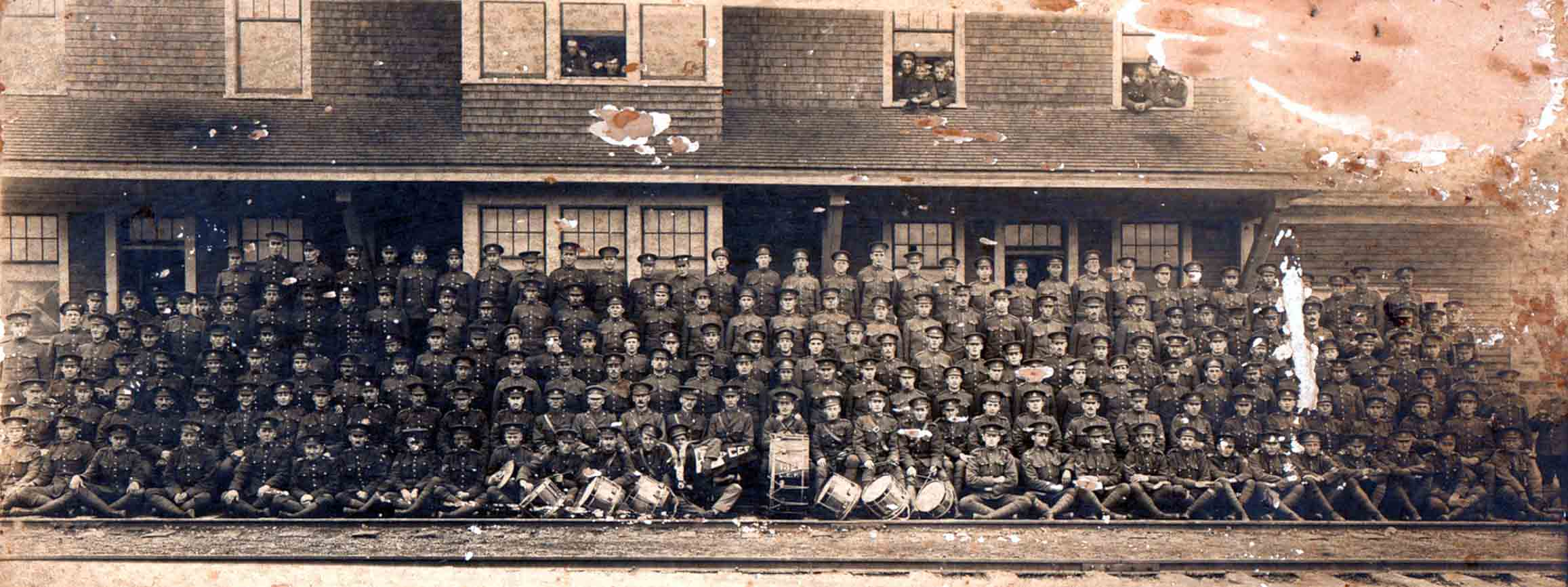
132nd Battalion CEF
