= Norm Kirby =

Canadian veteran (1925–2021)

Norman Kirby (1925–2021) was a Canadian veteran.

Born in New Westminster, British Columbia on 9 July 1925, Kirby dropped out of school at age 14 to work on tugboats. He applied to the Royal Canadian Navy when the Second World War began, but was rejected due to his lack of education. Instead he joined the Canadian Army and participated in Operation Overlord as a member of the North Shore Regiment. He was promoted to corporal because of his actions capturing a German gun at La Trésorerie. He became the youngest sergeant in the Third Division after the Battle of the Rhineland. He participated in the liberation of the Netherlands before being discharged from the army. He received the French Legion of Honour and the Field-Marshal Montgomery Award for Gallantry for his wartime service. Kirby attended the 75th D-Day anniversary at "Juno Beach" in France on 6 June 2019.
