= 165th Battalion (Acadiens), CEF =

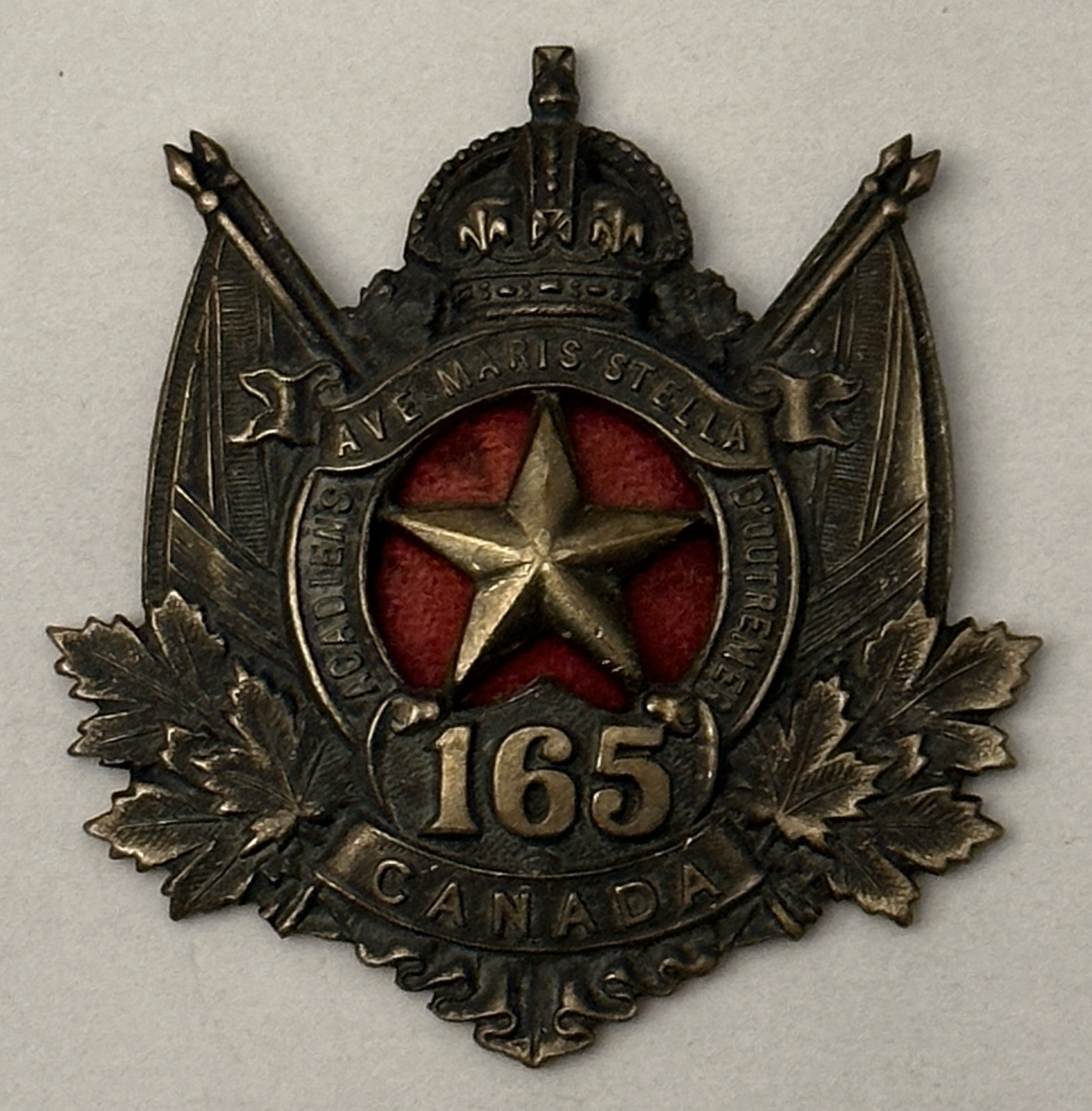
- Cap badge
- Active: 1915 - 7 April 1917
- Country: Canada
- Branch: Canadian Expeditionary Force
- Type: Infantry
- Size: Battalion
- Garrison/HQ: Moncton
- Motto(s): Ave Maris Stella
- Engagements: First World War

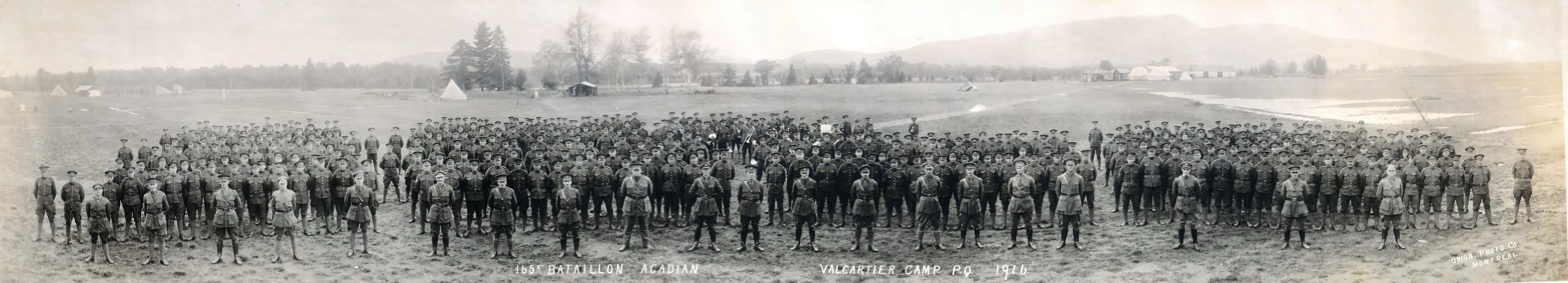
165th Battalion

The 165th (French Acadian) Battalion, CEF was a unit in the Canadian Expeditionary Force during the First World War. Based in Moncton, New Brunswick, the unit began recruiting in late 1915 throughout the Maritime provinces. After sailing to England in March 1917, the battalion was absorbed into the 13th Reserve Battalion on April 7, 1917. The 165th (French Acadian) Battalion, CEF had one Officer Commanding: LCol L. C. D'Aigle.

The 165th Battalion is perpetuated by The North Shore (New Brunswick) Regiment.

== See also ==
- Military history of the Acadians

== Sources ==
- Meek, John F. Over the Top! The Canadian Infantry in the First World War. Orangeville, Ont.: The Author, 1971.
