= Robert Harris (painter) =

Welsh-born Canadian painter (1849–1919)

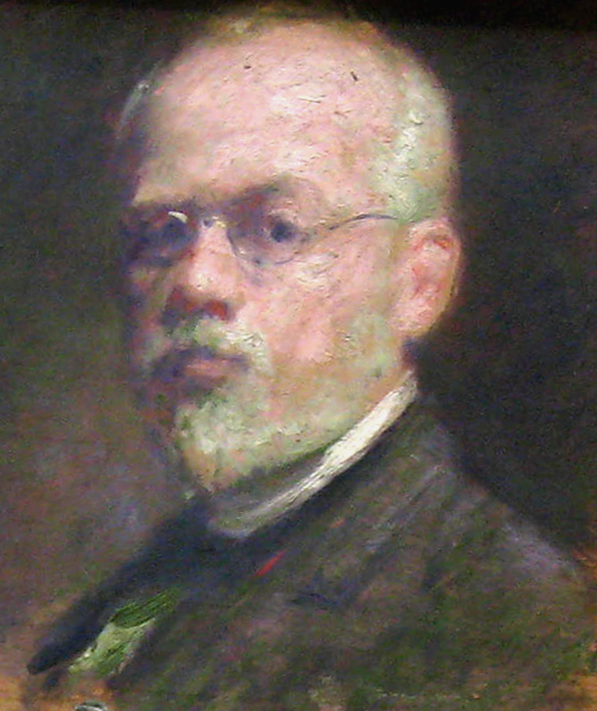
- Self-portrait (1908)
- Born: September 18, 1849; Bryn y Pîn, Caerhun, Wales
- Died: February 27, 1919 (aged 69); Montreal, Quebec, Canada
- Known for: Painter
- Spouse: Elizabeth Putnam (married 1885)

Robert Harris CMG RCA (September 18, 1849 – February 27, 1919) was a Welsh-born Canadian painter, most noted for his portrait of the Fathers of Confederation.

== Early life ==
Born in Caerhun, Conwy, Wales, Robert Harris grew up on his father's farm before moving to Charlottetown, Prince Edward Island in 1856. Encouraged by his mother, he developed an interest in art, and to practice drawing, he often sketched images from magazines. In 1867, he travelled to Liverpool, where he independently studied and sketched from the plaster casts in the local museum, learning human anatomy and proportion. Already skilled in portraiture, and receiving commissions, he decided to pursue formal instruction in 1873 in Boston at the Lowell Institute, in London at the Slade School of Art with Alphonse Legros (1877) and at the Heatherly School of Fine Art (1877), and, finally in Paris with Léon Bonnat at the Atelier Bonnat later that same year.

In 1880, he was commissioned to sketch the principal parties in the Donnelleys' murder trial for the Toronto Globe. He returned to study in Paris with Bonnat again in 1881. In 1882, he shared a studio with American painter A. B. Reinhardt at Ecouen, 17 miles from Paris. In 1883, he exhibited at the Paris Salon. While abroad, he may have learned of Impressionism.

On his return to Canada, in 1883, he was commissioned by the Dominion Government to paint a record of the 1864 Quebec Conference. The painting was later known by the popular title The Fathers of Confederation. Afterwards, he settled in Montreal, and began painting in an academic style the social and political elite in Toronto and Montreal.

== Career ==
In 1886, his painting of A Meeting of the School Trustees, of a woman teacher in P.E.I. named Kate Henderson converting a gathering of male trustees to her point of view, was the sensation of the 1886 Royal Canadian Academy of Arts show. The Fathers of Confederation, early in his career, established his reputation as one of the most distinguished portrait painters in Canada. Between 1889 and 1896, he painted over 55 commissioned portraits superior to other portraits being done at the time. In 1903, he painted his portrait of the Countess of Minto. In the late '00s, Harris turned to painting in an Impressionist-influenced mode after purchasing the first book in English on the subject, The French Impressionists (1860–1900) by Camille Mauclair. (His copy of the book is in the Confederation Centre Art Gallery). Over the next eight years, he began to incorporate small touches of vibrant colour and the fluid brushwork of the Impressionists, while still maintaining the formal characteristics of academic portraiture.

Harris taught at the Ontario School of Art (1879–1881) and at the Art Association of Montreal in the 1880s, and like Brymner, as a teacher, Harris followed an academic curriculum and encouraged many of his students, like George Agnew Reid and Mary Alexandra Bell Eastlake, to pursue further studies in Europe and to develop a distinctively Canadian art. An important collection of his works is housed at the Confederation Centre Art Gallery in Charlottetown, P.E.I.. In 1965, the Confederation Centre Art Gallery in Charlottetown accepted the Robert Harris Collection and Archives, which includes Harris's 1883 preparatory sketches for his painting of the Fathers of Confederation, from the Robert Harris Trust. This acquisition of drawings, paintings, sketchbooks, letters and memorabilia numbered nearly 9,000 items.

His painting A Meeting of the School Trustees appeared on a Canadian stamp in 1980 and was dramatized by television on Heritage Minutes. In 1986–1987, the exhibition Robert Harris, 1849-1919, was circulated in Wales by the National Museum of Wales. The first language of the catalogue was Welsh, the second English.

== Selected works ==
Paintings by Robert Harris

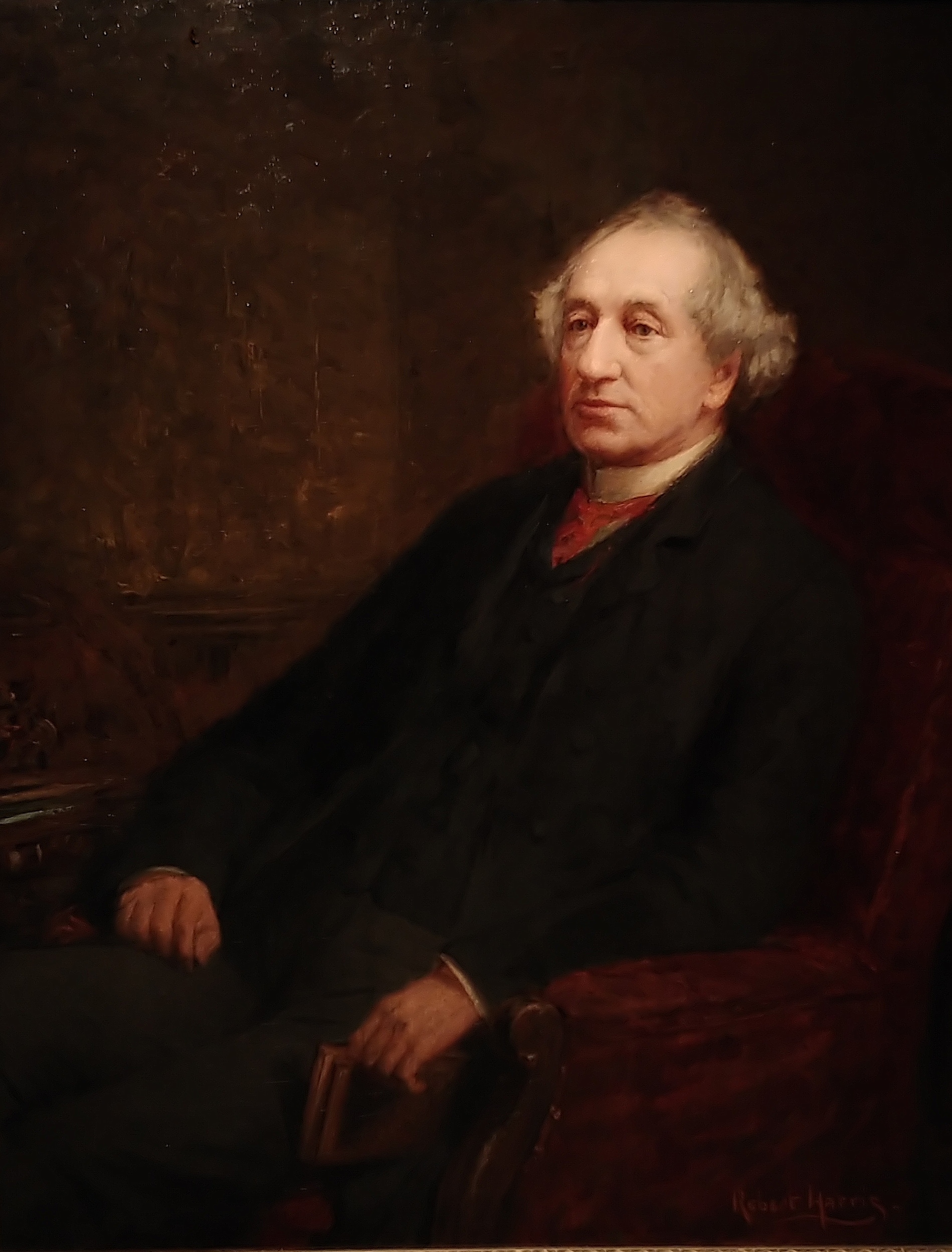
John A. Macdonald

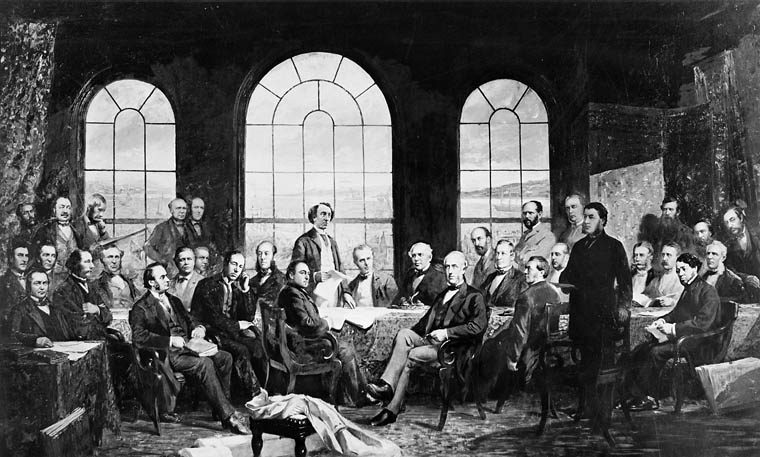
Conference at Québec in 1864, to settle the basics of a union of the British North American Provinces, also known as The Fathers of Confederation. The original painting was destroyed when the Centre Block of the Parliament Buildings was consumed by fire in 1916.

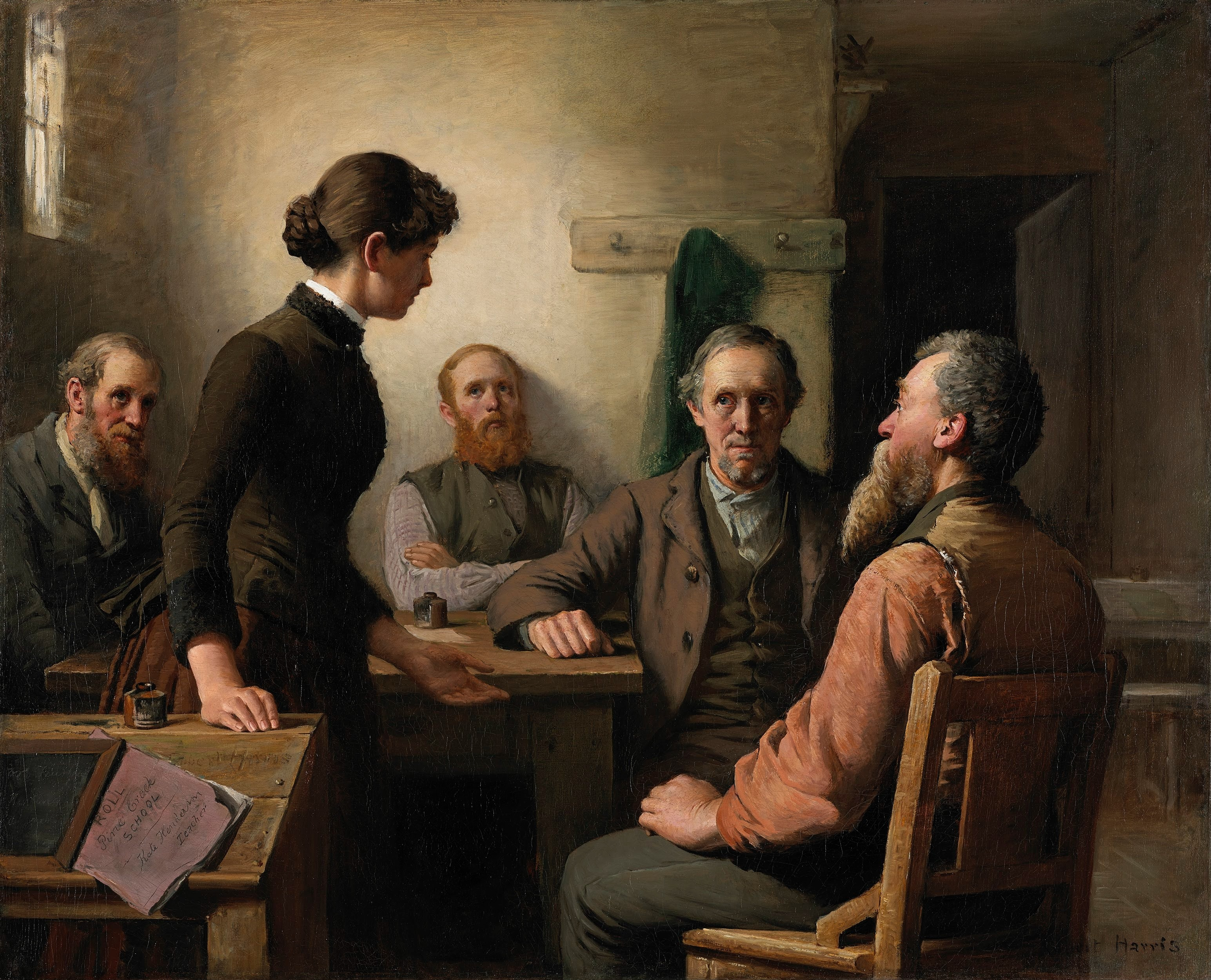
A Meeting of the School Trustees 1885, National Gallery of Canada

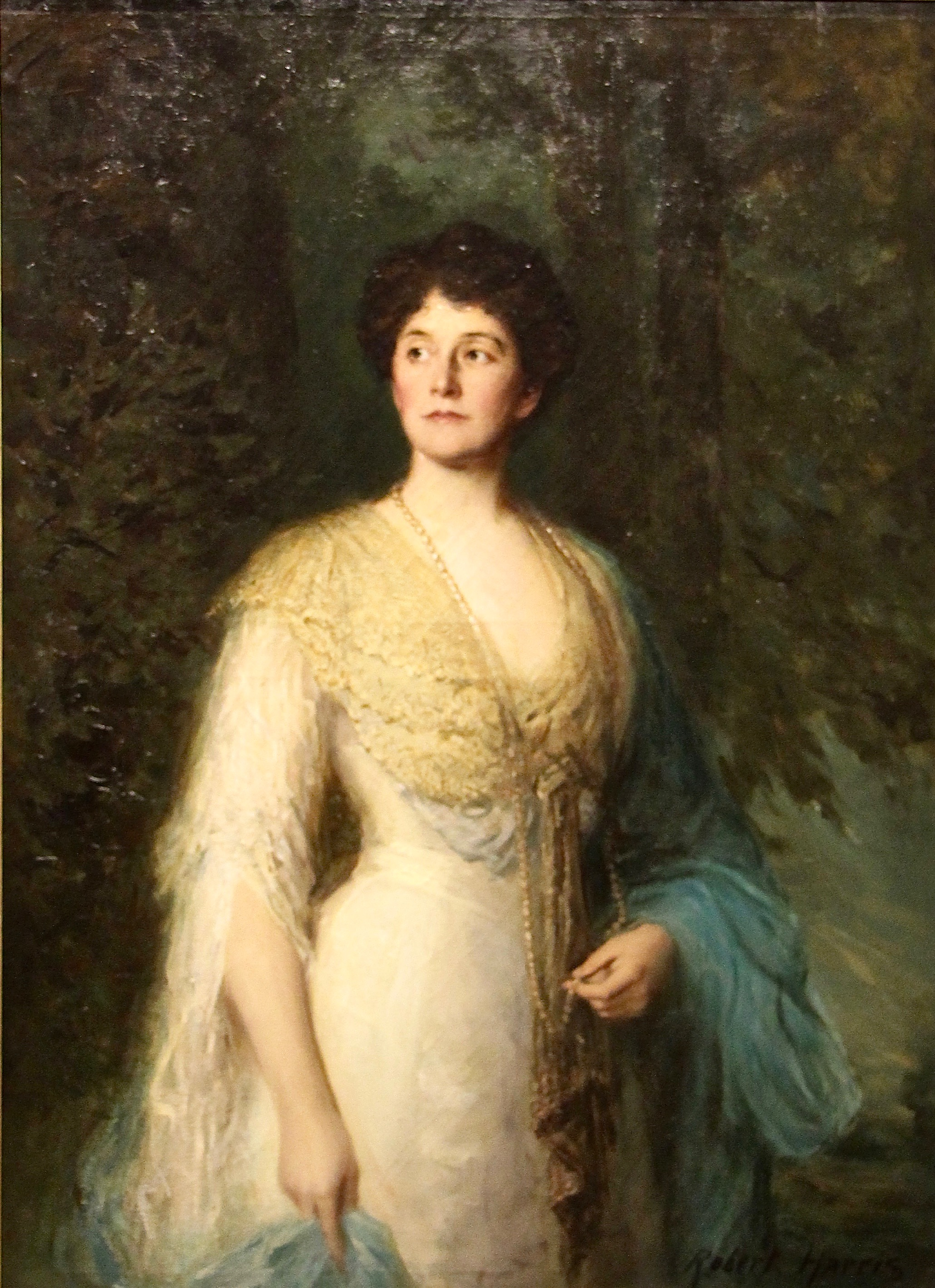
Countess of Minto

== Honours ==
Harris was a founding member of the Royal Canadian Academy of Arts in 1880 (RCA) and elected president of the RCA in 1893. In 1902, he was created a C.M.G., the Most Distinguished Order of Saint Michael and Saint George, a British order of chivalry awarded to men and women who hold high office or who render extraordinary or important non-military service in a foreign country, which can also be conferred for important or loyal service in relation to foreign and Commonwealth affairs. As president of the RCA in 1904, he helped spearhead the organization and installation of the Canadian exhibition at the Louisiana Purchase Exposition. At the exposition, he received the Commemorative Diploma and Gold Medal of Honour for Distinguished Service in Art.

== Personal life ==
Harris was a High church Anglican, attending numerous services at different churches, particularly enjoying sermons and drawing young ladies in the congregation.

On October 28, 1883, he moved into Jane Putnam's bordering house where he met her daughter Elizabeth (Bessie) Putnam. They got married on May 22, 1885, at St. George's Anglican Church, Montreal, but the couple had no children.

He was the brother of the architect William Critchlow Harris and took an active interest in the artwork of his cousin Kathleen Morris.

Robert Harris died on February 27, 1919, at his home in Montreal and was buried at St. Peter's Anglican Cemetery in Charlottetown.

== Legacy ==
The vast collection of works and archival material related to the artist is in the collection of the Confederation Centre Art Gallery, Charlottetown, P.E.I. where the founding director Moncrieff Williamson was the first scholar to publish several books and catalogues on him.

Cultural offices
Preceded by Otto Reinhold Jacobi	President of the Royal Canadian Academy of Arts; 1893–1906	Succeeded by George Agnew Reid
