= Archie MacNaughton =

Canadian Soldier

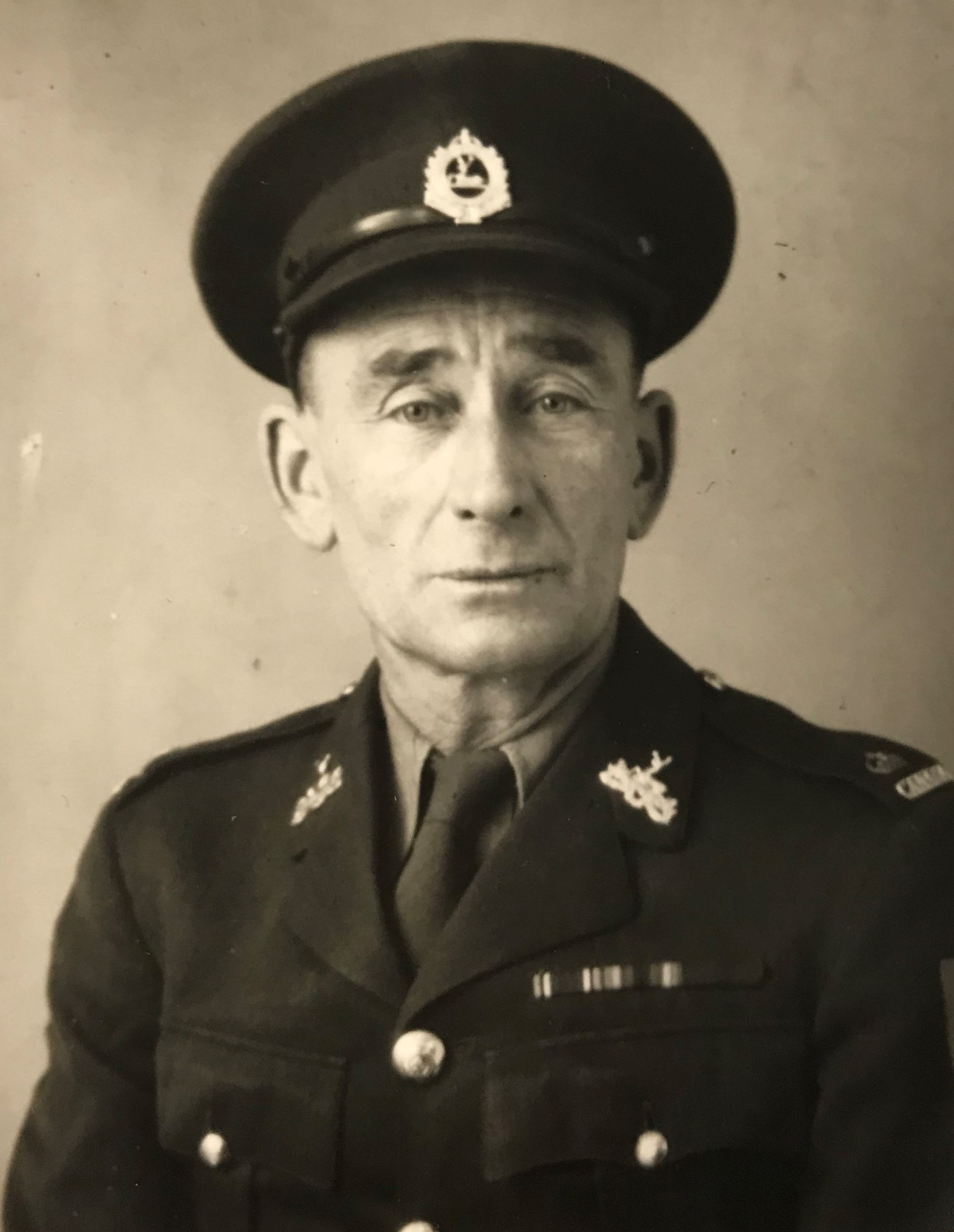
- MacNaughton c. 1939
- Born: John Archibald MacNaughton; 7 October 1896; Black River Bridge, New Brunswick, Canada
- Died: 6 June 1944 (aged 47); Tailleville, France
- Burial place: Beny-sur-Mer Canadian War Cemetery
- Spouse: Grace Helen
- Children: 2

John Archibald MacNaughton (7 October 1896 – 6 June 1944) was a Canadian soldier.

== Biography ==
Born on 7 October 1896 in Black River Bridge, New Brunswick, MacNaughton enlisted to fight in the First World War, serving in France and Belgium. On his return to Canada, he married Grace Helen, with whom he had two children. He was a farmer and taught Sunday School. In the Second World War he re-enlisted and served as a major with the North Shore Regiment. Because of his age – he was 43, and the maximum age for enlistment at the time was 45 – he was offered a retirement or reassignment, but opted to lead his company in Operation Overlord. He was killed in Tailleville and buried in the Beny-sur-Mer Canadian War Cemetery. He is believed to have been the oldest Canadian officer killed on D-Day.

== Legacy ==
In 2019 MacNaughton became the subject of a Heritage Minute.
