= Kate Henderson =

Kate Henderson was a Canadian pioneer in education.

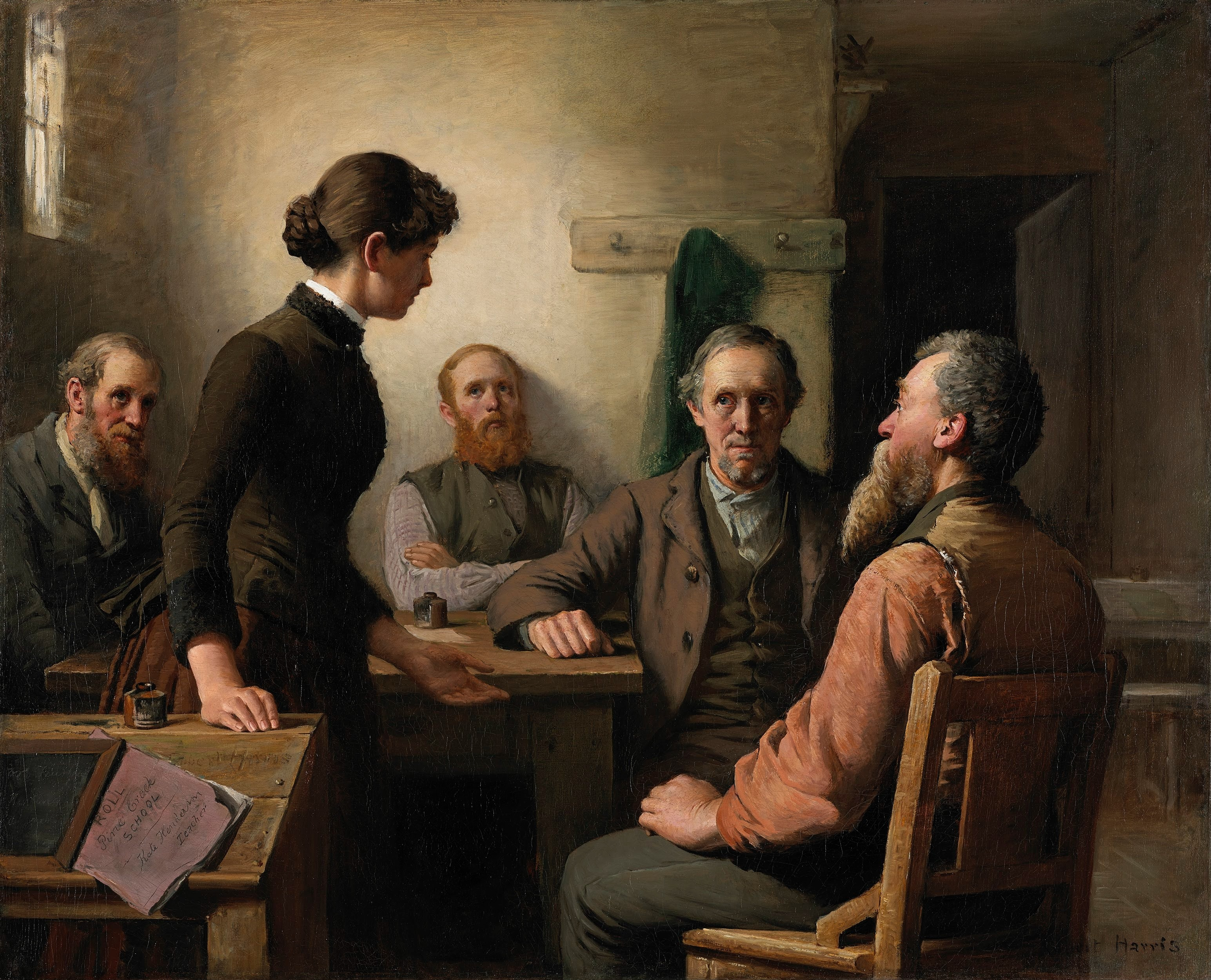
A Meeting of the School Trustees (Robert Harris, 1885)

Henderson was a teacher in a one-room school in Long Creek, Prince Edward Island in the 1880s. Around August 1885, she was contacted by PEI painter Robert Harris. Henderson told Harris of a confrontation she had had with local school trustees. While they preferred that she teach with traditional methods, she persuaded them of the efficacy of more (at the time) modern teaching techniques. This event inspired Harris to paint his A important Meeting of the School Trustees.

The meeting between Henderson and the trustees was portrayed by a Heritage Minute short feature on Canadian television starting around the 1990s.
