= North Shore (New Brunswick) Regiment =

The North Shore (New Brunswick) Regiment
- The badge of The North Shore (New Brunswick) Regiment
- Active: 1870–present
- Country: Canada
- Branch: Canadian Army (Reserve)
- Type: Infantry
- Role: Infantry
- Size: 4 companies
- Part of: 37 Canadian Brigade Group
- Garrison/HQ: Bathurst, Newcastle, Campbellton and Moncton
- Motto: Pro jure constans (Latin for 'Steadfast for the right')
- March: "The Ol' Nor' Shore"
- Engagements: First World War; Second World War; War in Afghanistan
- Battle honours: See #Battle honours
- Website: www.canada.ca/en/army/corporate/5-canadian-division/the-north-shore-regiment.html

Commanders
- Honorary colonel: Col Paolo Fongemie
- Honorary lieutenant-colonel: LCol Nadine Duguay-Lemay
- Commanding Officer: LCol Roch Couturier
- Regimental Sergeant Major: CWO Kevin Trites

The North Shore (New Brunswick) Regiment is a Primary Reserve infantry regiment of the Canadian Army, and is part of the 5th Canadian Division's 37 Canadian Brigade Group. The regiment is headquartered in Bathurst, New Brunswick, with sub-units in Newcastle (present day Miramichi), Campbellton and Moncton.

== Lineage ==
=== The North Shore (New Brunswick) Regiment ===
- Originated 25 February 1870 in Chatham, New Brunswick, as "The 73rd Northumberland New Brunswick" Battalion of Infantry
- Re-designated 8 May 1900 as the 73rd Northumberland Regiment
- Re-designated 15 March 1920 as The Northumberland (New Brunswick) Regiment, named after Northumberland County
- Re-designated 1 April 1922 as The North Shore (New Brunswick) Regiment
- Re-designated 7 November 1940 as the 2nd (Reserve) Battalion, The North Shore (New Brunswick) Regiment
- Re-designated 13 April 1946 as The North Shore (New Brunswick) Regiment
- Amalgamated 30 September 1954 with the 28th Field Battery, RCA and re-designated as the 2nd Battalion, The New Brunswick Regiment (North Shore)
- Re-designated 18 May 1956 as the 2nd Battalion, The Royal New Brunswick Regiment (North Shore)
- Reorganized 7 June 2012 as a separate regiment and re-designated The North Shore (New Brunswick) Regiment

=== 28th Field Battery, RCA ===
- Originated 18 December 1868 in Newcastle, New Brunswick, when a "field battery at Newcastle, County of Northumberland" was authorized
- Re-designated 1 July 1894 as the No. 12 "Newcastle" Field Battery
- Re-designated 28 December 1895 as the 12th "Newcastle" Field Battery, CA
- Re-designated 2 February 1920 as the (Newcastle) Battery, CFA
- Re-designated 12 March 1920 as the 90th (Newcastle) Battery, CFA
- Re-designated 1 July 1925 as the 90th (Newcastle) Field Battery, CA
- Re-designated 15 May 1927 as the 28th (Newcastle) Field Battery, CA
- Re-designated 3 June 1935 as the 28th (Newcastle) Field Battery, RCA
- Re-designated 28th (Reserve) (Newcastle) Field Battery, RCA
- Re-designated 7 November 1940 as the 28th (Reserve) Field Battery, RCA
- Re-designated 21 September 1945 as the 28th Field Battery, RCA
- Amalgamated 30 September 1954 with The North Shore (New Brunswick) Regiment

=== Lineage chart ===
Lineage chart

1812	1st, 2nd, and 3rd Bns, Northumberland County Regt	1st Bn, Saint John County Regt	1st and 2nd Bns, York County Regt
1815	Disbanded	Disbanded	Disbanded
1863	Independent infy coys
1868	Fd bty at Newcastle, County of Northumberland
1870	"The 73rd Northumberland NB" Bn of Infy
1894	No. 12 "Newcastle" Fd Bty
1895	12th "Newcastle" Fd Bty, CA
1900	73rd Northumberland Regt
1914	28th Bty, CEF
1915	132nd "Overseas" Bn, CEF	165th "Overseas" Bn, CEF
1917	Absorbed by 13th Reserve Bn	Absorbed by 13th Reserve Bn	Absorbed by 15th and 16th Fd Btys
1920	1st Bn (132nd Bn, CEF), The Northumberland (NB) Regt	2nd Bn (165th (French Acadian) Bn, CEF), (Note: Reserve) The Northumberland (NB) Regt	90th (Newcastle) Bty, CFA (Note: 12th Brigade, CFA)
1922	1st Bn (132nd Bn, CEF), The North Shore (NB) Regt	2nd Bn (165th (French Acadian) Bn, CEF), The North Shore (NB) Regt
1925	90th (Newcastle) Fd Bty, CA (Note: 12th Field Brigade, CA)
1927	28th (Newcastle) Fd Bty, CA
1935	28th (Newcastle) Fd Bty, RCA (Note: 12th Field Brigade, RCA)
1936	The North Shore (NB) Regt	Disbanded
1939	28th/89th Fd Bty, RCA, CASF (Note: 5th Field Brigade, RCA, CASF)
1940	The North Shore (NB) Regt, CASF
1940	1st Bn, The North Shore (NB) Regt, CASF	2nd (Reserve) Bn, The North Shore (NB) Regt	28th (Reserve) (Newcastle) Fd Bty, RCA (Note: 12th (Reserve) Field Brigade, RCA)
1941	28th (Newcastle) Fd Bty, RCA, CASF
1942	28th (Reserve) Fd Bty, RCA
1945	3rd Bn, The North Shore (NB) Regt, CIC, CAOF	Disbanded	28th Fd Bty, RCA
1946	Disbanded	The North Shore (NB) Regt	Disbanded
1954	2nd Bn, The NB Regt (North Shore)
1956	2nd Bn, The Royal NB Regt (North Shore)
2012	The North Shore (NB) Regt (Note: Perpetuates War of 1812 units)

== Perpetuations ==
=== War of 1812 ===
- 1st Battalion, Northumberland County Regiment
- 2nd Battalion, Northumberland County Regiment
- 3rd Battalion, Northumberland County Regiment
- 1st Battalion, Saint John County Regiment
- 1st Battalion, York County Regiment
- 2nd Battalion, York County Regiment

=== Great War ===
- 132nd Battalion (North Shore), CEF
- 165th Battalion (Acadiens), CEF
- 28th Field Battery, Canadian Field Artillery, CEF

== Operational history ==
=== Great War ===
Details of the 73rd Northumberland Regiment were called out on active service on 6 August 1914 for local protective duty.

The 132nd Battalion (North Shore), CEF was authorized on 22 December 1915 and embarked for Great Britain on 26 October 1916. There it provided reinforcements for the Canadian Corps until 28 January 1917, when its personnel were absorbed by the 13th Reserve Battalion, CEF. The battalion was subsequently disbanded on 21 May 1917.

The 165th Battalion (Acadiens), CEF was authorized on 22 December 1915 and embarked for Great Britain on 28 March 1917. On 7 April 1917, its personnel were absorbed by the 13th Reserve Battalion, CEF to provide reinforcements for the Canadian Corps. The battalion was subsequently disbanded on 15 April 1918.

The 28th Field Battery, CFA, CEF was authorized on 7 November 1914 and embarked for Great Britain on 9 August 1915. The battery disembarked in France on 21 January 1916, where it provided field artillery support as part of the 7th Brigade, CFA, CEF in France and Flanders until 19 March 1917, when its personnel were absorbed by the 15th Field Battery, CFA, CEF and 16th Field Battery, CFA, CEF. The battery was disbanded on 1 November 1920.

=== Second World War ===
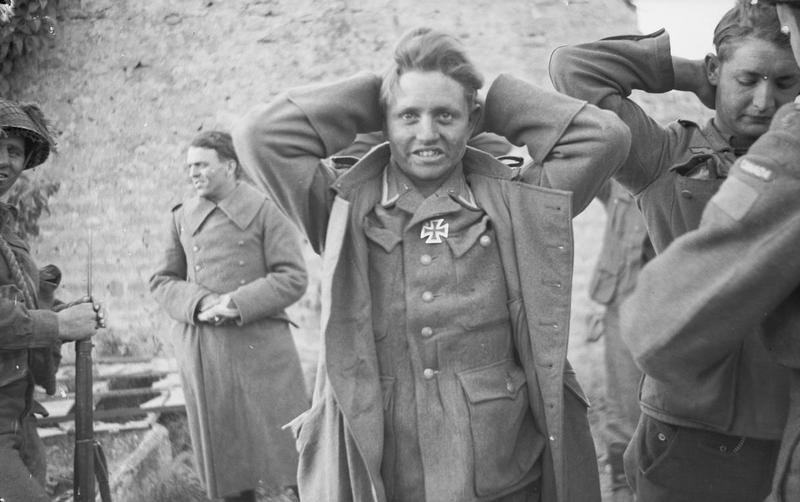
German prisoners & their North Shore guards in Langrune-sur-Mer, France on June 7, 1944

Details of The North Shore (New Brunswick) Regiment were called out on service on 26 August 1939 and then placed on active service on 1 September 1939 as The North Shore (New Brunswick) Regiment, CASF (Details), for local protection duties. The details called out on active service were subsequently disbanded on 31 December 1940.

The regiment mobilized The North Shore (New Brunswick) Regiment, CASF for active service on 24 May 1940. It was re-designated as the 1st Battalion, The North Shore (New Brunswick) Regiment, CASF on 7 November 1940. It embarked for Great Britain on 18 July 1941. On D-Day, 6 June 1944, it landed on JUNO Beach in Normandy, France, as part of the 8th Infantry Brigade, 3rd Canadian Infantry Division, and it continued to fight in North-West Europe until the end of the war. The overseas battalion disbanded on 15 January 1946.

During the Second World War, the regiment was first stationed in Woodstock, New Brunswick and then Sussex, New Brunswick. When it shipped overseas, it was initially stationed in Liverpool, after that it moved to Scotland near the castle of the Duke of Argyll.

On June 6, 1944, the regiment participated in the landing on Juno Beach, landing on Nan Red sector and losing nearly 50 men, including A Company commander Major Archie MacNaughton. On June 10, it liberated the town of Saint-Aubin-sur-Mer, Calvados. Newsreel footage of the North Shore Regiment landing under fire taken by the Canadian Army Film and Photo Unit became one of the most-used film depictions of the Allied D-Day landing.

On July 4, 1944, the men of the North Shore Regiment participated in Operation Windsor, the attack on the Carpiquet airfield. It lost nearly 130 men, and it was later known by the regiment's chaplain as the "graveyard of the regiment". The regiment later fought in Caen and all through France, continuously advancing with the 8th Canadian Infantry Brigade. It fought in places like Ranville, Bourguebus Ridge, Falaise, Quesnay Wood, the Laison and Chambois.

It helped clear the coast of France in late August and early September 1944, then it advanced into the Netherlands, taking part in the Battle of the Scheldt. It fought in Breskens Pocket in flooded fields and harsh conditions. After the Scheldt, it moved onto the rest of the Netherlands, fighting near the Bergsche Maas River at Kapelsche Veer.

In February 1945, it moved into Germany via amphibious landing. It fought in the Rhineland, the Hochwald, but then it doubled back to the Netherlands and conquered the Twente Canal, and liberated Zutphen where it met its most brutal urban fighting since Caen. It then moved back into Germany in April, and it ended the war on German soil.

On 1 June 1945, a second Active Force component of the regiment was mobilized for service with the Canadian Army Occupation Force in Germany, as the 3rd Battalion, The North Shore (New Brunswick) Regiment, CIC, CAOF. The battalion disbanded on 13 April 1946.

The 28th (Newcastle) Field Battery, RCA, in conjunction with the 89th Field Battery, RCA, mobilized the '28th/89th Field Battery, RCA, CASF for active service on 1 September 1939. This unit reorganized as two separate batteries on 1 January 1941, designated as the 28th (Newcastle) Field Battery, RCA, CASF and the 89th Field Battery, RCA, CASF. It embarked for Great Britain on 25 August 1940. On 8 July 1944, it landed in France as a sub-unit of the 5th Field Regiment, RCA, 2nd Canadian Infantry Division, where it continued to fight in North-West Europe until the end of the war. The overseas battery disbanded on 21 September 1945.

=== War in Afghanistan ===
The regiment contributed personnel to the various Task Forces which served in Afghanistan between 2002 and 2014.

== Battle honours ==
In the list below, battle honours in capitals were awarded for participation in large operations and campaigns, while those in lowercase indicate honours granted for more specific battles. Bold type indicates honours emblazoned on the regimental colour.

=== War of 1812 ===
- **Defence of Canada – 1812–1815 – Défense du Canada**
- **Niagara**

(both awarded in commemoration of the New Brunswick Fencible Infantry (104th Regiment of Foot)

Honorary distinction: The non-emblazonable honorary distinction Defence of Canada – 1812–1815 – Défense du Canada (partly awarded in commemoration of the New Brunswick Fencibles)

=== Great War ===
- **Arras, 1917, '18**
- **Hill 70**
- **Ypres, 1917**
- **Amiens**
- **Hindenburg Line**
- **Pursuit to Mons**

=== Second World War ===
- **Normandy Landing**
- **Caen**
- **Carpiquet**
- Bourguébus Ridge
- Faubourg de Vaucelles
- **Falaise**
- **Quesnay Wood**
- The Laison
- **Boulogne, 1944**
- Calais, 1944
- **The Scheldt**
- Breskens Pocket
- **The Rhineland**
- Waal Flats
- The Hochwald
- The Rhine
- **Emmerich–Hoch Elten**
- **Zutphen**
- North-West Europe, 1944–1945

The regiment did not contribute sufficient forces to meet the minimum level of 20 per cent of effective strength to qualify for the theatre honour “Afghanistan".

== Armoury ==
Site	Date(s)	Designated	Location	Description	Image
Col CC Gammon Armoury, 1820 King Avenue			Bathurst, New Brunswick	Housing the North Shore (New Brunswick) Regiment, this centrally located drill hall projects a solid, fortified appearance	

== Notable members ==
- Archie MacNaughton

== Order of precedence ==
Preceded by West Nova Scotia Regiment	The North Shore (New Brunswick) Regiment	Succeeded by The Nova Scotia Highlanders
