= 5th Field Regiment, RCA =

5th Field Artillery Regiment, RCA
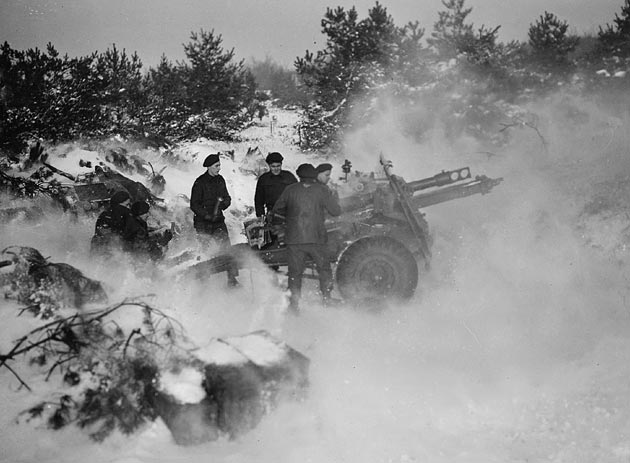
- Gunners of the 5th Canadian Field Regiment firing a 25-pounder gun
- Country: Canada
- Branch: Royal Canadian Artillery
- Type: Field artillery
- Size: 3 batteries
- Part of: 2nd Canadian Division; II Canadian Corps; First Canadian Army
- Equipment: Ordnance QF 25-pounder
- Engagements: World War II: Battle of Normandy; Battle for Caen; Battle of Verrières Ridge; Battle of the Scheldt; Battle of Walcheren Causeway; Western Allied invasion of Germany

The 5th Field Regiment, RCA was a Canadian field artillery unit active during World War II as part of the 2nd Canadian Infantry Division.

== Formation and sub-units ==
The regiment initially consisted of two batteries, the 5th (Westmount) Field Battery RCA and 28th (Newcastle) Field Battery RCA, which were mobilized on September 1st, 1939 (Note: At this stage the 5th battery was officially known as the 5th/73rd Field Battery RCA after merging with the 73rd. The 28th battery was similarly referred to as the 28th/89th Field Battery RCA. Both reverted to using only the first battery number after the regiment reorganized to contain three batteries, the 73rd becoming independent once again and becoming the third battery.). After arriving in England, the regiment reorganized into three batteries with 73rd Field Battery RCA becoming the regiment's third.

== North-West Europe ==
The 5th Field Regiment RCA landed in Normandy on 7 July 1944 and would fight in France, Belgium, the Netherlands, and Germany as part of the 2nd Canadian Infantry Division until the war's end.

The regiment most frequently fired in support of operations conducted by the 5th Canadian Infantry Brigade. Some of these engagements included an attack on the French village of Ifs outside Caen, the Battle of Verrières Ridge, and the Battle of Walcheren Causeway.
