= Juno Beach order of battle =

Order of battle on D-Day

This is the Juno Beach Order of Battle on D-Day (6th June, 1944). Code named Operation Neptune, part of Operation Overlord (Battle of Normandy) itself part of the Western Front of World War II.

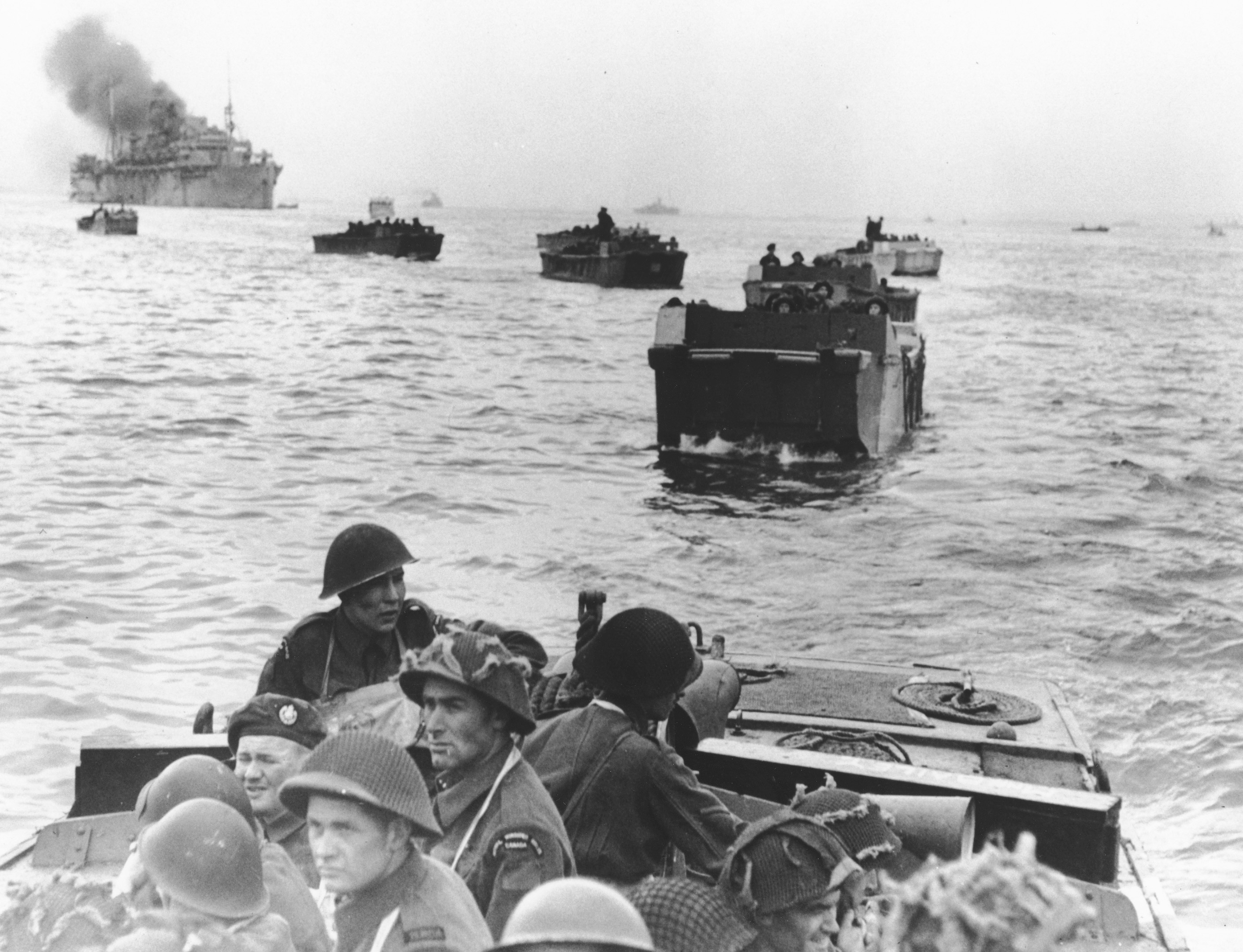
A line of LCAs carrying infantry of the Royal Winnipeg Rifles head for Juno Beach

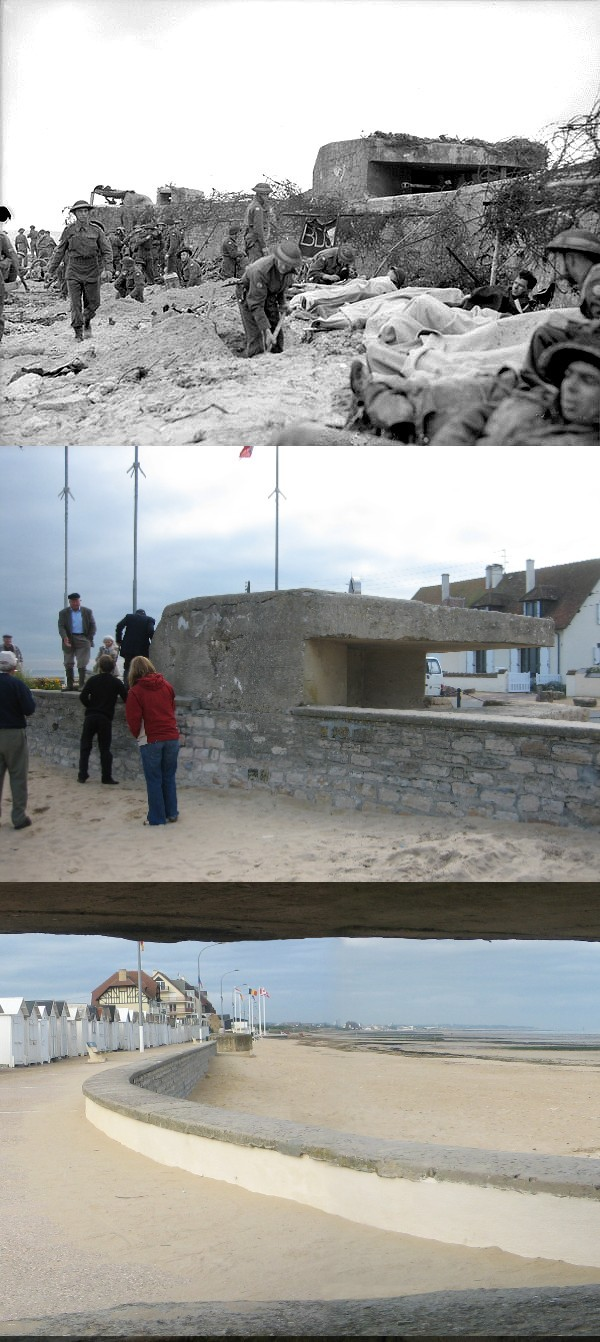
Top: Wounded Canadian soldiers lying on Juno beach awaiting transfer to casualty clearing station, Normandy, France, 6 June 1944. Middle: The same bunker in 2006. Bottom: The view down the beach from the bunker, showing enfilading fire position.

== Canadian Army ==
=== 3rd Canadian Infantry Division ===
3rd Canadian Infantry Division (Approx. 22,500 Canadian Soldiers)

- Headquarters, 3rd Canadian Infantry Division
  - (Branch of the General Officer Commanding)
    - General Officer Commanding (GOC), 3rd Canadian Infantry Division: Major-General Rod Keller
      - Aide-de-Camp: Captain C.W. Turton
  - (Branch of the General Staff)
    - General Staff Officer 1 (Chief of Staff): Lieutenant-Colonel J.D. Mingay
      - General Staff Officer 2 (Deputy Chief of Staff): Major P.W. Strickland
      - General Staff Officer 3 (Operations): Acting Major W.H. Seamark
      - General Staff Officer 3 (Intelligence): Captain G.G. Black
        - Intelligence Officer: Acting Captain G. Sinkewiez
      - General Staff Officer 3 (Operations): Captain W.L. Lovering
      - General Staff Officer 3 (Liaison): Captain Earl Olmsted
        - Liaison Officer 1: Captain W.J. Saul
        - Liaison Officer 2: Lieutenant G. Bradshaw
        - Liaison Officer 3: Lieutenant C.H.E. Askwith
  - (Branch of the Adjutant General and Quartermaster General)
    - Assistant Adjutant and Quartermaster General (AA&QMG): Lieutenant-Colonel Ernest Côté
      - Deputy Assistant Adjutant General: Major W.H. Wickwire
      - Deputy Assistant Quartermaster General: Major J.A.D. Craig
      - Staff Captain "Quartermaster": Captain J.F. McNaughton
      - Staff Learner "Quartermaster": Lieutenant G.P. Eligh
  - (Branch of Medical Services)
    - Assistant Director of Medical Services (ADMS): Colonel M.C. Watson
      - Deputy Assistant Director of Medical Services (DADMS): Major H.A. Procter
      - Staff Learner "Medical": Lieutenant John Barr
  - (Branch of Ordnance Services)
    - Assistant Director of Ordnance Services (ADOS): Lieutenant-Colonel N.P. Dew
      - Ordnance Officer: Captain R.D. Murray
      - Ordnance Officer: Captain W.J. Strachan
  - (Branch of Administrative Services)
    - Headquarters Paymaster: Acting Major W.S. Coate
    - Assistant Provost Marshal: Major W.G. Lloyd
    - Camp Commandant: Captain A.J.S. Turvey
    - Staff Learner "Administrative": Captain J.B. Lind
  - (Branch of Chaplain Services)
    - Senior Chaplain, Roman Catholic: Honorary Major J.M. Malone
    - Senior Chaplain. Protestant: Honorary Major R. McCleary
    - Assistant Senior Chaplain: Honorary Major J.W. Forth (Attached to CH of Ottawa)
    - Chaplain 1: Honorary Captain A. Gillis (Attached to 3 Div OSP)
    - Chaplain 2: Honorary Captain N.E. McLaughlin (Attached to 7 CRR)
    - Chaplain 3: Honorary Captain R.K. Perdue (Attached to 3 Div Sigs)
  - No. 3 Defence and Employment Platoon (Lorne Scots) (Lieutenant J.D.L. Stewart) (Division HQ Defence)
  - No. 4 Canadian Provost Company, Canadian Provost Corps (Officer Commanding: Captain G.C. Embery)
- Increment Headquarters, 3rd Canadian Infantry Division (Unique to 3rd CID as a First Wave D-Day Assault Division in British and Canadian Infantry Division TO&E)
  - Deputy General Officer Commanding, 3rd Canadian Infantry Division: Brigadier R.O.G. Morton
  - Deputy Assistant Director of Medical Services (Increment): Major J.P. Wells
  - Staff Officer Royal Engineers (SORE): Major D.W. Cunnington
  - General Staff Officer 2 (Staff Duties and Training Section (SD&T): Major A.S. Campbell
  - General Staff Officer 2 (Liaison): Acting Major W.E. Fess
  - General Staff Officer 3 (Staff Duties and Training Section (SD&T): Major H.J. Kennedy
  - General Staff Officer 3 (Operations): Major L.H. Fraser
  - Staff Captain: Captain H.C. Palmer (Attached to 7CIB HQ)
  - Staff Captain: Captain R.I. Findlater (Attached to 8CIB HQ)
  - Staff Captain: Major H.S. Fosberry (Attached to 9CIB HQ)
  - Staff Captain "Administrative": Captain L.C. Ritchardson
  - Staff Captain "Quartermaster": Captain R.A. Hallonouist
  - Staff Captain "Quartermaster": Captain C.J. Radcliffe
  - Increment "A" Officer: Captain A. Meiklejohn
  - Increment "A" Officer: Lieutenant H.K. Hazard
  - Increment "B" Liaison Officer: Captain K. Wilson (Attached to 7CIB HQ)
  - Increment "B" Liaison Officer: Captain A.J. Baker (Attached to 7CIB HQ)
  - Increment "B" Liaison Officer: Captain W.A. Teed (Attached to 8CIB HQ)
  - Increment "B" Liaison Officer: Lieutenant J.F. Lake (Attached to 8CIB HQ)
  - Increment "B" Liaison Officer: Captain A. Stewart (Attached to 9CIB HQ)
  - Increment "B" Liaison Officer: Captain W.J. Preston (Attached to 3CID HQ)
  - Increment "B" Liaison Officer: Lieutenant D. Eastwood (Attached to 3BID HQ)
  - Unknown Position: Captain N.P. Nedved (Attached to 3CID OFdP)

7th Canadian Infantry Brigade – Mike Green / Mike Red and Nan Green Beaches

- (Headquarters, 7th Canadian Infantry Brigade).
  - Brigade Commander: Brigadier H.W. Foster
  - Brigade Major (Chief of Staff): Major P.W. Bennett
  - General Staff Officer 3 (Deputy Chief of Staff): Acting Major L.A.G. Rounding
  - Staff Captain: Captain R.W. Knechtel
  - Camp Commandant: Captain H.D. Knox
  - Brigade Transport Officer: Captain W.H.F. Jolley
  - Brigade Royal Army Service Corps Officer: Captain F.G. Megill (RCASC)
  - Brigade Paymaster Officer: Captain D.D. Murphy (RCAPC)
  - Brigade Ordnance and Mechanical Engineer Officer: Captain J.C. Stone (RCOC)
  - Brigade Intelligence Officer: Captain P.H. Mash
  - Military Liaison Officer: Captain J.E. Reekie
  - Liaison Officer 1: Captain J.W. Stewart
  - Liaison Officer 2: Lieutenant R.B. Allan
  - Liaison Officer 3: Lieutenant H.G. Robson (Liaison with RWR) (WIA: 6th June, 1944)
  - Chaplain 1: Honorary Captain J.L. Steele (HQ)
  - Chaplain 2: Honorary Captain E.W. Horton (Attached to the RWR)
  - Chaplain 3: Honouary Captain R.L. Seaborn (Attached to the CSR)
  - Chaplain 4: Honorary Captain G.H. Jamieson (Attached to the RRR)
  - 7th Canadian Infantry Brigade Ground Defence Platoon (Lorne Scots) (Lieutenant M.D. Grant)
- 1st Battalion, The Royal Winnipeg Rifles, CASF (TO&E Strength: 848 men (37 officers and 811 other ranks)
  - Battalion Headquarters (50 men: 5 officers and 45 other ranks)
    - Commanding Officer: Lieutenant-Colonel J.M. Meldram
    - Second-in-Command: Major R.R. Fultz
    - Adjutant: "Unknown"
    - Medical Officer: Captain R.M. Caldwell (RCAMC)
    - Intelligence Officer: Lieutenant S.H.B. Ketchen
  - HQ Company (97 men: 5 officers and 92 other ranks)
    - Officer Commanding: "Unknown"
    - No. 1 (Signals) Platoon
    - No. 2 (Administrative) Platoon
      - Quartermaster: Captain R.F. Ogletree
      - Transport Officer: Captain B.D. Strachan
      - Paymaster: Captain W.H. Lund (RCAPC)
  - Support Company (192 men: 7 officers and 185 other ranks)
    - Officer commanding: Captain D.B. Robertson
    - No. 3 (Mortar) Platoon (Lieutenant A.G. Bieber)
    - No. 4 (Carrier) Platoon (Captain H.C. Chadderton)
    - No. 5 (Anti-Tank) Platoon
    - No. 6 (Pioneer) Platoon ( Lieutenant W.G. Speechly
  - A Company (127 men: 5 122 other ranks)
    - Officer Commanding: Major F.E. Hodge (Note: executed as POW: 8th June, 1944)
    - Second-in-Command: Lieutenant F.O. Myles (WIA: 6th June, 1944) (Rep: Capt. McConvey (POW: 8th June, 1944)
    - No. 7 (Rifle) Platoon (Lieutenant J.W.F. Battershill)
    - No. 8 (Rifle) Platoon: (Lieutenant R.S. Moglove)
    - No. 9 (Rifle) Platoon: (Lieutenant D.J. Glasgow (POW: 8th June, 1944)
  - B Company (127 men: 5 officers and 122 other ranks) (Juno Beach: First Wave) (Mike Red)
    - Captain P.E. Gower (POW: 8th June, 1944)
    - 3 x Rifle Platoon
  - C Company (127 men: 5 officers and 122 other ranks)
    - Major J.M.D. Jones
    - No. 13 (Rifle) Platoon
    - No. 14 (Rifle) Platoon ( Lieutenant W.S. Ferguson (Note: executed as POW: 8th June, 1944)
    - No. 15 (Rifle) Platoon (Lieutenant L.J. McQueen (Note: KIA: 8th June 1944) (Juno Beach: First Wave, Mike Red, Attached to B Company for landing)
  - D Company (127 men: 5 officers and 122 other ranks) (Juno Beach: First Wave, Mike Green and Mike Red)
    - Officer Commanding: Major L.R. Fulton
    - No. 16 (Rifle) Platoon (Lieutenant J.W. Benham (Note: KIA: 8th June 1944)
    - No. 17 (Rifle) Platoon
    - No. 18 (Rifle) Platoon (Lieutenant J. Mitchell)
- 1st Battalion, The Regina Rifle Regiment, CASF (TO&E Strength: 848 men (37 officers and 811 other ranks)
  - Battalion Headquarters (50 men: 5 officers and 45 other ranks)
    - Commanding Officer: Lieutenant-Colonel F.M. Matheson
    - Second-in-Command: Major A.S. Gregory
    - Adjutant: Captain L.K. Gass
    - Medical Officer: Captain W.S. Huckvale (RCAMC)
    - Intelligence Officer: Lieutenant J.G. Baird
  - HQ Company (97 men: 5 officers and 92 other ranks)
    - Officer Commanding: Captain A.C.V. Hall)
    - No. 1 (Signals) Platoon (Platoon Commander and Signals Officer: Lieutenant R.B. Murchison (Note: KIA: 6th June 1944)
    - No. 2 (Administrative) Platoon (Captain N.D. McDonald
  - Support Company (192 men: 7 officers and 185 other ranks)
    - Officer Commanding: Captain E.G. Syme)
    - No. 3 (Mortar) Platoon (Lieutenant G.A. Cooper)
    - No. 4 (Carrier) Platoon (Captain R.G. Shinnan)
    - No. 5 (Anti-Tank) Platoon (Captain F.R. Dickson)
    - No. 6 (Pioneer) Platoon (Lieutenant A.E. Smith)
  - A Company (127 men: 5 officers and 122 other ranks) (Juno Beach: First Wave, Nan Green)
    - Officer Commanding: Major D.D. Grosch (WIA: 6th June, 1944)
    - No. 7 (Rifle) Platoon (Lieutenant J.L. Garner)
    - No. 8 (Rifle) Platoon (Lieutenant J.R. Heisler)
    - No. 9 (Rifle) Platoon (Lieutenant W.D. Grayson)
  - B Company (127 men: 5 officers and 122 other ranks) (Juno Beach: First Wave, Nan Green)
    - Officer Commanding: Major F.L. Peters (KIA: 6th June, 1944)
    - No. 10 (Rifle) Platoon ( Lieutenant H.O. Ziffle)
    - No. 11 (Rifle) Platoon ( Lieutenant J.C. Treleaven)
    - No. 12 (Rifle) Platoon ( Lieutenant J.W. McNinch)
  - C Company (127 men: 5 officers and 122 other ranks)
    - Officer Commanding: Major C.S.T. Tubb
    - No. 13 (Rifle) Platoon (Lieutenant R.R. Smith)
    - No. 14 (Rifle) Platoon (Lieutenant R.B. Porter)
    - No. 15 (Rifle) Platoon (Lieutenant W.C. White)
  - D Company (127 men: 5 officers and 122 other ranks)
    - Officer Commanding: Major J.V. Love (KIA: 6th June, 1944)
    - No. 16 (Rifle) Platoon (Lieutenant H.S. Roberts)
    - No. 17 (Rifle) Platoon ( Lieutenant C.M. Rehill)
    - No. 18 (Rifle) Platoon (Lieutenant L.G. Putnam)
- 1st Battalion, The Canadian Scottish Regiment, CASF (TO&E Strength: 848 men (37 officers and 811 other ranks)
  - Battalion Headquarters (50 men: 5 officers and 45 other ranks)
    - Commanding Officer: Lieutenant-Colonel F.N. Cabeldu
    - Second-in-Command: Major C.M. Wightman
    - Adjutant: Captain R.S. Gray
    - Medical Officer: Captain J.C.G. Young
    - Intelligence Officer: Lieutenant F.H. Werts
    - Regimental Sergeant Major: Warrant Officer Class I. J. Strothard
  - HQ Company (97 men: 5 officers and 92 other ranks)
    - Officer Commanding: Captain E.G. English
    - Company Sergeant Major: Warrant Officer Class II. J.A. Hunter
    - No. 1 (Signals) Platoon (Platoon commander and Signals Officer: Lieutenant R. Nicoletti )
    - No. 2 (Administrative) Platoon
    - Regimental Quartermaster Sergeant: Warrant Officer Class II. J.M. Sutherland
    - Company Quartermaster Sergeant: Staff Sergeant J.H. McDermott
    - Attached: Supervisor P.C. Elderfield (Auxiliary Services)
  - Support Company (192 men: 7 officers and 185 other ranks)
    - Officer Commanding: Captain L.S. Henderson
    - Company Sergeant Major: Warrant Officer Class II. R.A. Knight
    - Company Quartermaster Sergeant: Staff Sergeant A.G. Grant
    - No. 3 (Mortar) Platoon (Lieutenant J.J. Andrews)
    - No. 4 (Carrier) Platoon (Captain J.D.M. Gillan)
    - No. 5 (Anti-Tank) Platoon (Captain R.H. Tye)
    - No. 6 (Pioneer) Platoon (Lieutenant D.C. Bowen)
  - A Company (127 men: 5 officers and 122 other ranks)
    - Officer Commanding: Major A.H. Plows
    - No. 7 (Rifle) Platoon (Lieutenant R.E. Turnbull)
    - No. 8 (Rifle) Platoon (Lieutenant G.I. Hope)
    - No. 9 (Rifle) Platoon (Lieutenant B. Clarke)
  - B Company (127 men: 5 officers and 122 other ranks)
    - Officer Commanding: Major R.M. Lendrum
    - No. 10 (Rifle) Platoon (Lieutenant J.H. Russell)
    - No. 11 (Rifle) Platoon (Lieutenant S.R. Ross)
    - No. 12 (Rifle) Platoon (Lieutenant I.P. MacDonald)
  - C Company (127 men: 5 Officer and 122 other ranks) (Juno Beach: First Wave, Mike Green)
    - Officer Commanding: Major D.G. Crofton
    - No. 13 (Rifle) Platoon (Lieutenant V.R. Schjelderup)
    - No. 14 (Rifle) Platoon (Lieutenant D.A. Hay)
    - No. 15 (Rifle) Platoon ( Lieutenant F.G. Radcliff)
  - D Company (127 men: 5 officers and 122 other ranks)
    - Officer Commanding: Major G.T. MacEwan)
    - No. 16 (Rifle) Platoon ( Lieutenant J.P.R. Mollison)
    - No. 17 (Rifle) Platoon ( Lieutenant T.W.L. Butters)
    - No. 18 (Rifle) Platoon ( Lieutenant A.C. Peck)

8th Canadian Infantry Brigade – Nan White and Nan Red Beaches

- (Headquarters, 8th Canadian Infantry Brigade).
  - Brigade Commander: Brigadier K.G. Blackader
  - Brigade Major (Chief of Staff): Acting Major G.L. Boone
  - General Staff Officer 3 (Deputy Chief of Staff): Acting Major K.S. Osler
  - Staff Captain: Captain R.R. Logie
  - Camp Commandant: Acting Captain R.L. Bickford
  - Brigade Transport Officer: Captain W.R. Lawson
  - Brigade Royal Army Service Corps Officer: Captain J.M. Berry (RCASC)
  - Brigade Paymaster Officer: Captain G.E. Wilson (RCAPC)
  - Brigade Ordnance and Mechanical Engineer Officer: "Unknown" (RCOC)
  - Brigade Intelligence Officer: Acting Captain J.L.S. Steven
  - Military Liaison Officer: Major R.W. Bullmore
  - Liaison Officer 1: Captain F.G. Cooke
  - Liaison Officer 2: Lieutenant C.R. Lamoureux
  - Liaison Officer 3: Lieutenant J.T. Weir
  - Chaplain 1: Honorary Captain A.J. Mowat (HQ)
  - Chaplain 2: Honorary Captain J.C. Clough (Attached to the QORC)
  - Chaplain 3: Honouary Captain R.M. Hickey (Attached to the NSR)
  - Chaplain 4: Honorary Captain R.W. Huard (Attached to the LRC)
  - 8th Infantry Brigade Ground Defence Platoon (Lorne Scots) (Lieutenant S. Caldecott)
- 1st Battalion, The Queen's Own Rifles of Canada, CASF (TO&E Strength: 848 men (37 officers and 811 other ranks)
  - Battalion Headquarters (50 men: 5 officers and 45 other ranks)
    - Commanding Officer: Lieutenant-Colonel J.G. Spragge
    - Second-in-Command: Major S.M. Lett
    - Adjutant: Captain W.J. Weir
    - Medical Officer: Captain A. Kirsch (RCAMC)
    - Intelligence Officer: Lieutenant R.C. Rae
  - HQ Company (97 men: 5 officers and 92 other ranks)
    - Officer Commanding: Captain T.E. Parkinson
    - No. 1 (Signals) Platoon (Platoon Commander and Signals Officer: Lieutenant D.M. Philp (RCCS)
    - No. 2 (Administrative) Platoon
  - Support Company (192 men: 7 officers and 185 other ranks)
    - Officer Commanding: Captain R.A. Cottrill
    - No. 3 (Mortar) Platoon ( Lieutenant B. Dunkleman)
    - No. 4 (Carrier) Platoon (Captain J.G. Price)
    - No. 5 (Anti-Tank) Platoon (Captain T.A. Staunton)
    - No. 6 (Pioneer) Platoon (Lieutenant J.D. Pickup)
  - A Company (127 men: 5 officers and 122 other ranks) (Juno Beach: First Wave) (Nan White)
    - Officer Commanding: Major H.E. Dalton
    - No. 7 (Rifle) Platoon (Lieutenant J.L. Pond)
    - No. 8 (Rifle) Platoon (Lieutenant D.D. Owen)
    - No. 9 (Rifle) Platoon (Platoon Commander Lieutenant P.C. Rea)
  - B Company (127 men: 5 officers and 122 other ranks) (Juno Beach: First Wave, Nan White)
    - Officer Commanding: Major C.O. Dalton
    - No. 10 (Rifle) Platoon
    - No. 11 (Rifle) Platoon
    - No. 12 (Rifle) Platoon
  - C Company (127 men: 5 officers and 122 other ranks)
    - Officer Commanding: Major O.A. Nickson
    - No. 13 (Rifle) Platoon
    - No. 14 (Rifle) Platoon
    - No. 15 (Rifle) Platoon (Platoon Commanderr:)
  - D Company (127 men: 5 officers and 122 other ranks)
    - Officer Commanding: Major J.N. Gordon
    - No. 16 (Rifle) Platoon
    - No. 17 (Rifle) Platoon
    - No. 18 (Rifle) Platoon
- 1st Battalion, Le Régiment de la Chaudière, CASF (TO&E Strength: 848 men (37 officers and 811 other ranks)
  - Battalion Headquarters (50 men: 5 officers and 45 other ranks)
    - Commanding Officer: Lieutenant-Colonel J.E.G.P. Mathieu
    - Second-in-Command: Major G.L. Taschereau
    - Adjutant: Captain J.E.A.G.G. Beaudry
    - Medical Officer:
    - Intelligence Officer:
  - HQ Company (97 men: 5 officers and 92 other ranks)
    - Officer Commanding:
    - No. 1 (Signals) Platoon (Platoon Commander and Signals Officer: Lieutenant L. Thirlwall (RCCS)
    - No. 2 (Administrative) Platoon
  - Support Company (192 men: 7 officers and 185 other ranks)
    - Officer Commanding
    - No. 3 (Mortar) Platoon
    - No. 4 (Carrier) Platoon ( Captain M.C.M. Gauvin)
    - No. 5 (Anti-Tank) Platoon
    - No. 6 (Pioneer) Platoon
  - A Company (127 men: 5 officers and 122 other ranks)
    - Officer Commanding: Major H. Lapointe
    - No. 7 (Rifle) Platoon
    - No. 8 (Rifle) Platoon
    - No. 9 (Rifle) Platoon ( Lieutenant A.P. Ladas (KIA: 6th June, 1944)
  - B Company (127 men: 5 officers and 122 other ranks)
    - Officer Commanding: Major J.F. L'Espérance
    - No. 10 (Rifle) Platoon
    - No. 11 (Rifle) Platoon
    - No. 12 (Rifle) Platoon
  - C Company (127 men: 5 officers and 122 other ranks)
    - Officer Commanding: Major J.G. Sévigny
    - No. 13 (Rifle) Platoon
    - No. 14 (Rifle) Platoon ( Lieutenant W. Foy)
    - No. 15 (Rifle) Platoon
  - D Company (127 men: 5 officers and 122 other ranks)
    - Officer Commanding: Major G.O. Taschereau
    - No. 16 (Rifle) Platoon
    - No. 17 (Rifle) Platoon
    - No. 18 (Rifle) Platoon
    - Two of the Three D Coy. Lieutenants are J.R. Grégiore, and Curtins
- 1st Battalion, The North Shore (New Brunswick) Regiment, CASF (TO&E Strength: 848 men (37 officers and 811 other ranks)
  - Battalion Headquarters (50 men: 5 officers and 45 other ranks)
    - Battalion Commander: Lieutenant-Colonel D.B. Buell
    - Battalion Second-in-Command: Major G.E. Lockwood
    - Adjutant: Captain J.R. Ross
    - Medical Officer: Captain J.A. Patterson (RCAMC)
    - Intelligence Officer: Lieutenant B.A. Oulton
  - HQ Company (97 men: 5 officers and 92 other ranks)
    - Officer Commanding: Captain J.A.L. Robichaud
    - No. 1 (Signals) Platoon (Platoon Commander and Signals Officer: Lieutenant J.E. Chochinov (RCCS)
    - No. 2 (Administrative) Platoon
  - Support Company (192 men: 7 officers and 185 other ranks)
    - Officer Commanding: Captain C.C.L. Gammon
    - No. 3 (Mortar) Platoon ( Lieutenant W.B. Parker)
    - No. 4 (Carrier) Platoon ( Captain J.A. Currie)
    - No. 5 (Anti-Tank) Platoon ( Captain C.H. Murphy)
    - No. 6 (Pioneer) Platoon ( Lieutenant B.A.J. McElwaine)
  - A Company (127 men: 5 officers and 122 other ranks) (Juno Beach: First Wave, Nan Red)
    - Officer Commanding: Major J.A. MacNaughton (KIA: 6th June, 1944)
    - No. 7 (Rifle) Platoon (Platoon Commander Lieutenant F.F. Moar)
    - No. 8 (Rifle) Platoon ( Lieutenant C.S. Mersereau)
    - No. 9 (Rifle) Platoon ( Lieutenant M.M. Keith)
  - B Company (127 men: 5 officers and 122 other ranks) (Juno Beach: First Wave, Nan Red)
    - Officer Commanding: Major R.B. Forbes
    - No. 10 (Rifle) Platoon ( Lieutenant C.F. Richardson)
    - No. 11 (Rifle) Platoon ( Lieutenant G.V. Moran)
    - No. 12 (Rifle) Platoon ( Lieutenant P.H. McCann)
  - C Company (127 men: 5 officers and 122 other ranks)
    - Officer Commanding: Major R.H. Daughney
    - No. 13 (Rifle) Platoon
    - No. 14 (Rifle) Platoon
    - No. 15 (Rifle) Platoon
  - D Company (127 men: 5 officers and 122 other ranks)
    - Officer Commanding: Major J.E. Anderson
    - No. 16 (Rifle) Platoon
    - No. 17 (Rifle) Platoon
    - No. 18 (Rifle) Platoon

9th Canadian Infantry Brigade – Landing through the Nan Sector Beaches in the later day.

- (Headquarters, 9th Canadian Infantry Brigade).
  - Brigade Commander: Acting Brigadier D.G. Cunningham
  - Brigade Major (Chief of Staff): Major N. Kingsmill
  - General Staff Officer 3 (Deputy Chief of Staff): Captain D.M. Dickson
  - Staff Captain: Captain C.H. Barrett
  - Camp Commandant: Acting Captain B.M. Thomson
  - Brigade Transport Officer: Captain J.E. Gillespie
  - Brigade Royal Army Service Corps Officer: Captain P.R. Gilman (RCASC)
  - Brigade Paymaster Officer: Captain J.L. Muirhead (RCAPC)
  - Brigade Ordnance and Mechanical Engineer Officer: Captain J.W. Ferguson (RCOC)
  - Brigade Intelligence Officer: Acting Captain G.E. Franklin
  - Military Liaison Officer:
  - Liaison Officer 1: Captain P.K. Kennedy
  - Liaison Officer 2: Lieutenant L.L. Smith
  - Liaison Officer 3: Lieutenant D.J. Nicholson
  - Chaplain 1: Honorary Captain D.A. Kerr (HQ)
  - Chaplain 2: Honorary Captain J.M. Anderson (Attached to the HLIC)
  - Chaplain 3: Honorary Captain R.T.F. Brain (Attached to the SDGH)
  - Chaplain 4: Honorary Captain G. Cox (Attached to the NNSH)
  - 9th Infantry Brigade Ground Defence Platoon (Lorne Scots) (Lieutenant A.P. Graham)
- 1st Battalion, The Highland Light Infantry of Canada, CASF (TO&E Strength: 848 men (37 officers and 811 other ranks)
  - Battalion Headquarters (50 men: 5 officers and 45 other ranks)
    - Commanding Officer: Lieutenant-Colonel F.M. Griffiths
    - Second-in-Command: Major G.A.M. Edwards
    - Adjutant: Captain G.D. Sim
    - Medical Officer: Captain C. Schneiderman (RCAMC)
    - Intelligence Officer: Lieutenant C.D. Campbell
  - HQ Company (97 men: 5 officers and 92 other ranks)
    - Officer Commanding: Major F.A. Sparks
    - Battalion Quartermaster: Lieutenant G.G. Hipel
    - Battalion Transport Officer: Lieutenant J.A. Ferguson
    - No. 1 (Signals) Platoon (Platoon Commander and Signals Officer: Lieutenant E.D. Axford (RCCS)
    - No. 2 (Administrative) Platoon
  - Support Company (192 men: 7 officers and 185 other ranks(
    - Officer Commanding: Captain D.P. Kennedy
    - No. 3 (Mortar) Platoon
    - No. 4 (Carrier) Platoon
    - No. 5 (Anti-Tank) Platoon
    - No. 6 (Pioneer) Platoon
  - A Company (127 men: 5 officers and 122 other ranks)
    - Officer Commanding: Major D.N. Durnward
    - No. 7 (Rifle) Platoon
    - No. 8 (Rifle) Platoon
    - No. 9 (Rifle) Platoon
  - B Company (127 men: 5 officers and 122 other ranks)
    - Officer Commanding: Captain V.E. Stark
    - No. 10 (Rifle) Platoon
    - No. 11 (Rifle) Platoon ( Lieutenant R.L. Chantler)
    - No. 12 (Rifle) Platoon
  - C Company (127 men: 5 officers and 122 other ranks)
    - Officer Commanding: Major R.D. Hodgins
    - No. 13 (Rifle) Platoon ( Lieutenant R.J. McCormick)
    - No. 14 (Rifle) Platoon
    - No. 15 (Rifle) Platoon
  - D Company (127 men: 5 officers and 122 other ranks)
    - Officer Commanding: Major H. Anderson
    - No. 16 (Rifle) Platoon
    - No. 17 (Rifle) Platoon
    - No. 18 (Rifle) Platoon
- 1st Battalion, The Stormont, Dundas and Glengarry Highlanders, CASF (TO&E Strength: 848 men (37 officers and 811 other ranks)
  - Battalion Headquarters (50 men: 5 officers and 45 other ranks)
    - Commanding Officer: Lieutenant-Colonel G.H. Christiansen
  - HQ Company (97 men: 5 officers and 92 other ranks)
    - Officer Commanding:
    - No. 1 (Signals) Platoon (Platoon Commander and Signals Officer: Lieutenant H.B. Hall (RCCS)
    - No. 2 (Administrative) Platoon
  - Support Company (192 men: 7 officers and 185 other ranks)
    - Officer Commanding:
    - No. 3 (Mortar) Platoon ( Lieutenant G.D. Utman)
    - No. 4 (Carrier) Platoon ( Captain R.H. Smith)
    - No. 5 (Anti-Tank) Platoon ( Captain R.B. Gault)"
    - No. 6 (Pioneer) Platoon
  - A Company (127 men: 5 officers and 122 other ranks)
    - Officer Commanding: Major F.L. Fisher
    - No. 7 (Rifle) Platoon
    - No. 8 (Rifle) Platoon
    - No. 9 (Rifle) Platoon
  - B Company (127 men: 5 officers and 122 other ranks), Officer Commanding: Major N.M. Gemmell
  - C Company (127 men: 5 officers and 122 other ranks), Officer Commanding: Major F.W. Lander
  - D Company (127 men: 5 officers and 122 other ranks), Officer Commanding: Major A.D. MacDonald
- 1st Battalion, The North Nova Scotia Highlanders, CASF (TO&E Strength: 848 men (37 officers and 811 other ranks)
  - Battalion Headquarters (50 men: 5 officers and 45 other ranks)
    - Commanding Officer: Lieutenant-Colonel C. Petch
  - HQ Company (97 men: 5 officers and 92 other ranks)
    - Officer Commanding: Captain A.W. Jefferson
    - No. 1 (Signals) Platoon (Platoon Commander and Signals Officer: Lieutenant W.E. Bimm (RCCS)
    - No. 2 (Admin) Platoon
  - Support Company (192 men: 7 officers and 185 other ranks)
    - Officer Commanding: Captain A.J. Wilson
    - No. 3 (Mortar) Platoon ( Lieutenant C.M. MacDonald)
    - No. 4 (Carrier) Platoon ( Captain E.S. Gray)
    - No. 5 (Anti-Tank) Platoon (
    - No. 6 (Pioneer) Platoon (
  - A Company (127 men: 5 officers and 122 other ranks), Officer Commanding: Major L.M. Rhodenizer (POW: 7th June, 1944)
  - B Company (127 men: 5 officers and 122 other ranks), Officer Commanding: Major J.W. Douglas (WIA: 7th June, 1944)
  - C Company (127 men: 5 officers and 122 other ranks), Officer Commanding: Major J.D. Learment (POW: 7th June, 1944)
  - D Company (127 men: 5 officers and 122 other ranks), Officer Commanding: Major C.F. Kennedy

=== Support Battalions, 3rd Canadian Infantry Division ===
- 3rd Signals Regiment, Royal Canadian Corps of Signals
  - Battalion Headquarters
    - Commanding Officer: Lieutenant-Colonel G.O. Gamble (Commander, RCS, 3rd CID)
    - Second-in-Command: Major T.G. Grant
    - Adjutant: Captain J.T. Brodie
    - Technical Management Officer: Captain K.C. Carruthers
    - Cipher Officer: Captain N.H. Edelstein
    - Quartermaster: Captain A.M. Ervin
    - Paymaster: Captain V.S. Simpson (RCAPC)
  - No. 1 (HQ) Company (Commander: Captain F.S. Rutherford)
  - No. 2 Company (Commander: Major H.S. Patterson)
  - No. 3 Company (Commander: Major K.M. Johnston)
- 7th Reconnaissance Regiment (17th Duke of York's Royal Canadian Hussars)
  - Commanding Officer: Lieutenant-Colonel T.C. Lewis
  - HQ Squadron (Major D.G. MacKenzie)
  - A Squadron (Major W.C. Bowen)
    - (3× Scout Troops and 1× Assault Troop)
  - B Squadron (Major E.R. Allen)
    - (3× Scout Troops and 1× Assault Troop)
  - C Squadron (Major C.W. MacLean)
    - (3× Scout Troops and 1× Assault Troop)
- 1st Battalion, The Cameron Highlanders of Ottawa (Machine Gun), CASF (Vickers machine guns and ML 4.2-inch mortars)
  - Battalion Headquarters
    - Commanding Officer: Lieutenant-Colonel P.C. Klaehn
    - Second-in-Command: Major R. Rowley
    - Adjutant: Captain G.A. Harris
    - Technical Adjutant: Captain J.M. Lambert
    - Medical Officer: Captain S.B. Fraleigh (RCAMC)
    - Intelligence Officer: Lieutenant J.A. Morris
  - HQ Company
    - Officer Commanding: Captain G.L. Tripp
    - No. 1 (Signal) Platoon (Platoon Commander and Signals Officer: Captain R.F. Ferrie (RCCS)
    - No. 2 (Administrative) Platoon
  - A Company (Attached to 7th CIB)
    - Officer Commanding: Major J.W.H. Rowley
    - No. 3 (MG) Platoon (Lieutenant R.G. Ashman) (Attached to The Royal Winnipeg Rifles)
    - No. 4 (MG) Platoon (Lieutenant R.C. Willis) (Attached to The Regina Rifle Regiment)
    - No. 5 (MG) Platoon (Captain H.B. Gonder) (Attached to The Canadian Scottish Regiment)
  - B Company (Attached to 8th CIB)
    - Officer Commanding: Major J.M. Carson
    - No. 6 (MG) Platoon (Lieutenant J.C. Woodward) (Attached to The Queen's Own Rifles of Canada)
    - No. 7 (MG) Platoon (Lieutenant W.T. Sharp) (Attached to The North Shore (New Brunswick) Regiment)
    - No. 8 (MG) Platoon (Lieutenant J.H.M. Dupuis) (Attached to Le Régiment de la Chaudière)
  - C Company (Attached to 9th CIB)
    - Officer Commanding: Major C.C. Hill
    - No. 9 (MG) Platoon (Lieutenant P.B. Smellie) (Attached to The Highland Light Infantry of Canada)
    - No. 10 (MG) Platoon (Lieutenant J.S. Couper) (Attached to The North Nova Scotia Highlanders)
    - No. 11 (MG) Platoon (Lieutenant L.M. Malouin) (Attached to The Stormonet, Dundas, Glengarry Highlanders)
  - D Company
    - Officer Commanding: Major R.M. Ross
    - No. 12 (Mortar) Platoon (Captain D.M. Thompson) (Attached to 9th CIB for D-Day)
    - No. 13 (Mortar) Platoon (Captain H.C. Swift) (Attached to 7th CIB for D-Day)
    - No. 14 (Mortar) Platoon (Captain Laidlaw) (Attached to 7th CIB for D-Day)
    - No. 15 (Mortar) Platoon (Captain L. Ritchie) (Attached to 9th CIB for D-Day)

Royal Regiment of Canadian Artillery – Royal Artillery, 3rd Canadian Infantry Division

- (Headquarters, Royal Artillery: 3rd Canadian Infantry Division)
  - Commander, Royal Artillery: Brigadier P.A.S. Todd
- (12th Field Regiment, RCA). (24× 105mm M7 Priest) (Fire support for 7th CIB landing)
  - Battalion Commander: Lieutenant-Colonel R.H. Webb
  - 11th Field Battery, RCA (8× M7 Priest)
    - Battery Headquarters
    - "A" Troop (4× M7 Priest)
    - "B" Troop (4× M7 Priest)
  - 16th Field Battery, RCA (8× M7 Priest), Battery Commander: Major J.D. Ross
    - "C" Troop (4× M7 Priest)
    - "D" Troop (4× M7 Priest)
  - 43rd Field Battery, RCA (8× M7 Priest)
    - Battery Headquarters (Major A.G. Goldin)
    - "A" Troop (4× M7 Priest)
    - "B" Troop (4× M7 Priest)
- (13th Field Regiment, RCA). (24× 105mm M7 Priest) (Fire support for 7th CIB landing)
  - Battalion Headquarter ( Acting Lieutenant-Colonel F. le P.T. Clifford)
  - 22nd Field Battery, RCA (8× M7 Priest)
    - Battery Headquarters
      - Battery Commander: Major J.D. Baird
      - Battery Captain: Captain H.L. Thorne
      - Command Post Officer: Lieutenant J.M. Doohan (WIA: 6th June, 1944)
      - Assistant Command Post Officer: Lieutenant J.A. Crutcher
    - "A" Troop (4× M7 Priest)
    - "B" Troop (4× M7 Priest)
  - 44th Field Battery, RCA (8× M7 Priest)
    - Battery Headquarters (Major J.D. Young)
    - "C" Troop (4× M7 Priest)
    - "D" Troop (4× M7 Priest)
  - 78th Field Battery, RCA (8× M7 Priest)
    - Battery Headquarters (Major R.K. MacKenzie)
    - "E" Troop (4× M7 Priest)
    - "F" Troop (4× M7 Priest)
- (14th Field Regiment, RCA). (24× 105mm M7 Priest) (Fire support for 8th CIB landing)
  - Battalion Headquarters
    - Battalion Commander: Lieutenant-Colonel H.S. Griffin
  - 34th Field Battery, RCA
    - Battery Headquarters
      - Battery Commander: Major A.W. Duguid
      - Battery Captain: Captain G.S. Maulson
      - Command Post Officer: Lieutenant Y.H. Belyea
      - Assistant Command Post Officer: Lieutenant G.E.M. Ruffee
    - "A" Troop (4× M7 Priest)
    - "B" Troop (4× M7 Priest)
  - 66th Field Battery, RCA (Battery Leader: Major J.F. Kibler)
    - Battery Commander: Major J.F. Kibler
    - "C" Troop (4× M7 Priest)
    - "D" Troop (4× M7 Priest)
  - 81st Field Battery, RCA (8× M7 Priest)
    - Battery Commander: Major G.E. Purcell
    - "E" Troop (4× M7 Priest)
    - "F" Troop (4× M7 Priest)
- 3rd Anti-Tank Regiment, RCA. (16× M10 76.2mm tank destroyers, and 32×QF 6-pounder anti-tank guns)
  - Battalion Headquarters
    - Battalion Commander: Lieutenant-Colonel J.P. Phin
  - 4th Anti-Tank Battery, RCA (Battery Commander: Major D.U. MacDonald)
    - "A" Troop (4× 6-pounder Anti-Tank guns)
    - "B" Troop (4× 6-pounder Anti-Tank guns)
    - "C" Troop (4× M10 Tank Destroyers)
  - 52nd Anti-Tank Battery, RCA (Battery Commander: Major J.V. Rose)
    - "D" Troop (4× 6-pounder Anti-Tank guns)
    - "E" Troop (4× 6-pounder Anti-Tank guns)
    - "F" Troop (4× M10 Tank Destroyers)
  - 94th Anti-Tank Battery, RCA (Battery Commander: Major E.G. Scott)
    - "G" Troop (4× 6-pounder Anti-Tank guns)
    - "H" Troop (4× 6-pounder Anti-Tank guns)
    - "I" Troop (4× M10 Tank Destroyers)
  - 103rd Anti-Tank Battery, RCA (Battery Commander: Major W.K. Love)
    - "J" Troop (4× 6-pounder anti-tank guns)
    - "K" Troop (4× 6-pounder anti-tank guns)
    - "L" Troop (4× M10 tank destroyers)
- 4th Light Anti-Aircraft Regiment, RCA
  - Battalion Headquarters
    - Battalion Commander: Lieutenant-Colonel C.E. Woodrow
  - 32nd Light Anti-Air Battery, RCA
    - Battery Headquarters ( Major J.M. Cousins)
    - "A" Troop
    - "B" Troop"
    - "C" Troop
  - 69th Light Anti-Air, RCA
    - Battery Headquarters
      - Battery Commander: Major B.F. Gossage
      - Battery Captain: Captain A.M. Appleby
      - Battery Headquarters Subaltern: Lieutenant H. Gwilliam
    - "D" Troop
    - "E" Troop"
    - "F" Troop
  - 100th Light Anti-Air Battery, RCA, Battery Commander: Major B.M. Osler
    - "G" Troop
    - "H" Troop"
    - "I" Troop
- Corps of Royal Canadian Engineers – Royal Engineers, 3rd Canadian Infantry Division
  - Headquarters, Royal Engineers: 3rd Canadian Infantry Division
    - Commander, Royal Engineers: Lieutenant-Colonel R.J. Cassidy
    - Adjutant, Royal Engineers: Captain T.V. Doran
    - Paymaster, Royal Engineers: Captain R.J. Sanders (RCAPC)
    - Medical Officer, Royal Engineers: Captain A. Portigal (RCAMC)
    - Intelligence Officer, Royal Engineers: Lieutenant F.B. Henderson
    - FE1: Lieutenant D.B. Campbell
    - FE2: Lieutenant R.H. Walker
  - No. 6 Canadian Field Company, RCE (Assault with 7th Canadian Infantry Brigade)
    - Company Commander: Major T.R. Murphy
    - Second-in-Command: Captain R.T. Miller
    - R.O.1: Lieutenant F.R. Cauley
    - R.O.2: Lieutenant A.S. Millen
    - No. 1 Platoon: Lieutenant J.A. Miller
    - No. 2 Platoon: Lieutenant J.N. Mustard
    - No. 3 Platoon: Lieutenant J.H. Alexander
    - Rear Party Officer: Lieutenant F.M. Woods
  - No. 16 Canadian Field Company, RCE (Assault with 8th Canadian Infantry Brigade)
    - Company Commander: Major V.C. Hamilton (WIA: 6th June, 1944) (Replaced by: Major D.W. Cunnington from Increment HQ)
    - Second-in-Command: Captain G.E. Smith
    - R.O.1: Lieutenant S.M. Schofield
    - R.O.2: Lieutenant M.C.A. Cameron
    - No. 1 Platoon: Lieutenant E.M. Peto
    - No. 2 Platoon: Lieutenant D.L. Yeats
    - No. 3 Platoon: Lieutenant L.P. Kenyon
  - No. 18 Canadian Field Company, RCE (Obstacle Clearance)
    - Company Commander: Major C.E. Brown
    - Second-in-Command: Captain C.B. Ross
    - R.O.1: Lieutenant K.G. Evans
    - R.O.2: Lieutenant W.C. McKenzie
    - No. 1 Platoon: Lieutenant R.C. Eddy
    - No. 2 Platoon: Lieutenant I.D. Macdonald
    - No. 3 Platoon: Lieutenant R.R. Jack
    - Rear Party Officer: Lieutenant W.W. Bolton
  - No. 3 Canadian Field Park Company, RCE
    - Company Commander: Major H.E. Main
  - No. 3 Canadian Divisional Bridge Platoon, RCE (Lieutenant A. Secter)

=== Rear-line Formations, 3rd Canadian Infantry Division ===
- Royal Canadian Army Service Corps
  - Headquarters, Royal Army Service Corps: 3rd Canadian Infantry Division
    - Commander, Royal Army Service Corps: Lieutenant-Colonel J.R.W.T. Bessonette
  - 7th Canadian Infantry Brigade Company (Attached to 7 CIB)
  - 8th Canadian Infantry Brigade Company (Attached to 8 CIB)
  - 9th Canadian Infantry Brigade Company (Attached to 9 CIB)
  - 3rd Canadian Infantry Divisional Troops Company
- Royal Canadian Army Medical Corps
  - No. 14 Canadian Field Ambulance (Lt-Col. J.W. Merritt (Attached to 7th CIB)
  - No. 22 Canadian Field Ambulance (Lt-Col. M.R. Caverhill (Attached to 8th CIB)
  - No. 23 Canadian Field Ambulance (Lt-Col. L.A. Loree (Attached to 9th CIB)
  - No. 5 Canadian Field Dressing Station
  - No. 7 Canadian Field Dressing Station
  - No. 7 Canadian Field Hygiene Section
- Canadian Dental Corps
  - No. 5 Company, Canadian Dental Corps (Divisional Dental Element)
- Royal Canadian Ordnance Corps
  - 3rd Canadian Infantry Division Ordnance Field Park
- Corps of Royal Canadian Electrical and Mechanical Engineers
  - Headquarters, Royal Electrical and Mechanical Engineers: 3rd Canadian Infantry Division
    - Commander, Royal Electrical and Mechanical Engineers: Lieutenant-Colonel E.M. Shields
  - 4th Canadian Light Anti-Air Workshop (Type A) (Attached to 4th LAA Regiment, RCA)
    - Workshop Commander: Captain G.R. Currie
  - 7th Canadian Infantry Brigade Workshop (Attached to 7th CIB)
  - 8th Canadian Infantry Brigade Workshop (Attached to 8th CIB)
  - 9th Canadian Infantry Workshop (Attached to 9th CIB)
  - No. 6 Canadian Light Aid Detachment (Type B) (Attached to CHO (MG)
  - No. 30 Canadian Light Aid Detachment (Type B) (Attached to 3rd FPC (RCE)
  - No. 31 Canadian Light Aid Detachment (Type B) (Attached to 3rd SR (RCCS)
  - No. 32 Canadian Light Aid Detachment (Type D) (Attached to 12th FR (RCA)
  - No. 33 Canadian Light Aid Detachment (Type D) (Attached to 13th FR (RCA)
  - No. 34 Canadian Light Aid Detachment (Type D) (Attached to 14th FR (RCA)
  - No. 35 Canadian Light Aid Detachment (Type D) (Attached to 3rd ATR (RCA)
  - No. 36 Canadian Light Aid Detachment (Type A) (Attached to 7th CIB)
  - No. 37 Canadian Light Aid Detachment (Type A) (Attached to 8th CIB)
  - No. 38 Canadian Light Aid Detachment (Type A) (Attached to 9th CIB)
  - No. 62 Canadian Light Aid Detachment (Type A) (Attached to 7th CRR)

Attached Formations, 3rd Canadian Infantry Division

- 2nd Canadian Armoured Brigade (Independent Armoured Brigade TO&E, attached from II Canadian Corps troops)
  - Headquarters, 2nd Canadian Armoured Brigade
    - Brigade Commander: Brigadier R.A. Wyman
    - Brigade Second-in-Command: Acting Colonel J.F. Bingham
    - Brigade Major (Chief of Staff): Major R.P. Rothschild
    - Deputy Assistant Adjutant and Quartermaster General: Major D.N.D. Freeman-Deane
    - Deputy Assistant Director of Medical Services: Major A.G. Minnes
    - Deputy Assistant Director of Ordnance Services: Major E.C. Cowan
    - Deputy Assistant Director of Mechanical Engineering: Major E.G. Pallister
    - Brigade Headquarters Squadron Commander: Major W.C. Weber
    - General Staff Officer 3 (Deputy Chief of Staff): Acting Major G.S.L. Butler
    - Brigade Royal Army Service Corps Officer: Captain K.M. Pack (RCASC)
    - Staff Captain: Captain R.H. Stapleford
    - Staff Lieutenant: Captain H.M. Sleigh
    - Brigade Headquarters Squadron Second-in-Command: Captain J.C. St. John
    - Brigade Headquarters Squadron Battle Captain: Captain N.M. McDougall
    - Paymaster: Captain J.R. Holmes
    - Sub Cashier: Captain K.A. Bryce
    - Liaison Officer 1: Captain T.C. Trenholme
    - Liaison Officer 2: Acting Captain W.S. Johnston
    - Liaison Officer 3: Lieutenant R.B. How
    - Liaison Officer 4: Lieutenant A.D. White
    - Chaplain 1: Honorary Captain E.J. Gleason (HQ)
    - Chaplain 2: Honorary Captain B.C. Creelman (Attached to the 1st Hussars)
    - Chaplain 3: Honorary Captain W.E. Harrison (Attached to the Fort Garry Horse)
    - Chaplain 4: Honorary Captain W.L. Brown (Attached to the Sherbrooke Fusilier Regiment) (Note: Executed as POW: 7th June, 1944)
    - Unknown Position: Lieutenant V.E. Lindsay
  - 2nd Canadian Armoured Brigade Signals (RCCS) (Major P.F. Burgoyne)
  - 2nd Canadian Armoured Brigade Workshop (RCEME) (Major D.F. Cornish)
  - 2nd Canadian Armoured Brigade Ordnance Field Park (RCAOC) (Major T.J. Warner)
  - 2nd Canadian Armoured Brigade Company (RCASC) (Major N. Allan)
  - No. 17 Canadian Light Field Ambulance (RCAMC) (Lieutenant-Colonel J.G. Jose)
  - No. 11 Canadian Provost Section (CPC) (Captain M.A. Fitzgibson)
  - No. 54 Canadian Light Aid Detachment (Type C) (RCEME) (Lieutenant P.C. Neil) (Attached to 1H)
  - No. 55 Canadian Light Aid Detachment (Type C) (RCEME) (Captain R.G. Struthers) (Attached to FGH)
  - No. 85 Canadian Light Aid Detachment (Type C) (RCEME) (Lieutenant C.H. Neil) (Attached to SFR)
- 6th Armoured Regiment (1st Hussars) (Attached to 7th CIB)
  - Battalion Headquarters
    - Battalion Commander: Lieutenant-Colonel R.J. Colwell
    - Battalion Second-in-Command: Major F.E. White
    - Adjutant: Captain R.G. Rogers
    - Paymaster: Captain J.G. Rigney (RCAPC)
    - Medical Officer: Captain A.E. Conley (RCAMC)
    - Signals Officer: Lieutenant D.C. Coughtry (RCCS)
    - Intelligence Officer: Lieutenant E.D.L. Miller
  - HQ Squadron
    - Squadron Commander: Major E.M. Harding
    - Second-in-Command: Captain H.S. Brydges
    - Quartermaster: Captain H.R. Herbert
    - Technical Adjutant (Transport Officer): Captain W.A. Robinson
    - Assistant Adjutant: Lieutenant G.R. Davy
    - Reconnaissance Troop Leader: Lieutenant W.A.P. Smith
    - Intercommunication Troop Leader: Lieutenant G.C. Campbell
    - Anti-Air Troop Leader: Lieutenant C.F. Oerton
  - A Squadron (19× M4A4 Sherman Mk V Duplex Drive amphibious medium tanks) (Juno Beach: First Wave, Mike Green and Red)
    - "A" Squadron Headquarters Troop
      - Squadron Commander: Major W.D. Brooks
      - Second-in-Command: Captain J.W. Powell
      - Battle Captain: Captain A.M. Fyfe
    - No. 1 Troop (Lieutenant H.M. Lees)
    - No. 2 Troop (Lieutenant H.A. Mills)
    - No. 3 Troop (Lieutenant G.C. Goff)
    - No. 4 Troop (Lieutenant H.K. Pattison)
    - No. 5 Troop (Lieutenant W.R.C. Little)
  - B Squadron (19× Sherman Mk V DD) (Juno Beach: First Wave, Nan Green)
    - "B" Squadron Headquarters Troop
      - Squadron Commander: Major J.S. Duncan
      - Second-in-Command: Captain H.L. Smuck
      - Battle Captain: Acting Captain R. Wildgoose
    - No. 1 Troop (Lieutenant E.L. Pease (KIA: 6 June 1944)
    - No. 2 Troop (Lieutenant F.B. Allen)
    - No. 3 Troop (Lieutenant C.M. McLeod (WIA: 6 June 1944)
    - No. 4 Troop (Lieutenant R.F. Seaman)
    - No. 5 Troop (Lieutenant B.M. Deans)
  - C Squadron (5× Sherman Mk Vc "Firefly" medium tanks and 14× Sherman Mk III medium tanks)
    - "C" Squadron Headquarters Troop
      - Squadron Commander: Major A.D'A. Marks
      - Second-in-Command: Captain R.H. Harrison
      - Battle Captain: Captain A.B. Conron
    - No. 1 Troop (Lieutenant G.W. Gordon)
    - No. 2 Troop (Lieutenant W.F. McCormick)
    - No. 3 Troop (Lieutenant G.K. Henry)
    - No. 4 Troop (Lieutenant C.A. Mills)
    - No. 5 Troop (Lieutenant O.G. Stoner)
  - (Attached Officers)
    - Rear Party Officer: Captain H.D. MacKenzie
    - Firefly Detachment Leader: Captain F.L. Irving (KIA: 6 June 1944)
      - 2× Sherman Mk Vc "Firefly" medium tanks
- 10th Armoured Regiment (The Fort Garry Horse) - Attached to 8th CIB
  - Battalion Headquarters (Lieutenant-Colonel R.E.A. Morton)
  - HQ Squadron
    - Squadron Commander: Major C.W. Fletcher
    - Second-in-Command: Captain W.A. Johnston
    - Quartermaster: Captain G.G. McKenzie
    - Technical Adjutant (Transport Officer): Captain O.J. Atkins
    - Assistant Adjutant: Lieutenant H.E. Theobald
    - Reconnaissance Troop Leader: Lieutenant V.T.L. Eriksson
    - Intercommunication Troop Leader: Lieutenant J.N. Bell
    - Anti-Air Troop Leader: Lieutenant E.C. Brumwell
  - A Squadron (5× Sherman Mk Vc "Firefly" Medium Tanks and 14× Sherman Mk III tanks)
  - "A" Squadron Headquarters Troop
    - Squadron Commander: Major H.C. Blanshard
    - Second-in-Command: Captain E.A. Goodman (WIA: 9 June, 1944)
    - Battle Captain: Captain W.G. Burgoyne
  - No. 1 Troop (Troop Leader:)
  - No. 2 Troop (Lieutenant D.M. McPherson)
  - No. 3 Troop (Troop Leader:)
  - No. 4 Troop (Troop Leader:)
  - No. 5 Troop (Troop Leader:)
  - B Squadron (19× Sherman Mk V DD Tanks) (Juno Beach: First Wave, Nan White)
    - "B" Squadron Headquarters Troop
      - Squadron Commander: Major J.A. Meindl (WIA: 6 June 1944)
      - Second-in-Command: Captain J.F.M. Hall (KIA: 9 June 1944)
      - Battle Captain: Acting Captain R.D. Grant
    - No. 1 Troop
    - No. 2 Troop
    - No. 3 Troop
    - No. 4 Troop
    - No. 5 Troop
    - B Sqn Troop Leaders are: Lieutenants W.G. Beatty (WIA: 9 June 1944) N.H.V. Brown (KIA: 6 June 1944), J.G. Fulton, J.P. Milner, and A.E. Rogers
  - C Squadron (19× Sherman Mk V DD tanks) (Juno Beach: First Wave, Nan Red)
    - "C" Squadron Headquarters Troop
      - Squadron Commander: Major W.R. Bray
      - Second-in-Command: Captain A.S. Christian
      - Battle Captain: Captain W.E. McAleese
    - No. 1 Troop
    - No. 2 Troop
    - No. 3 Troop
    - No. 4 Troop
    - No. 5 Troop
  - (Attached Officers)
    - Rear Party Officer: Captain T.N. Magee
    - Firefly Detachment Leader: Lieutenant E.F. Holt
      - 2× Sherman Mk Vc "Firefly" Medium Tanks
- 27th Armoured Regiment (The Sherbrooke Fusilier Regiment), CAC, CASF. Different TO&E compared to 1H and FGH (Attached to 9th CIB)
  - Battalion Headquarters
    - Battalion Commander: Lieutenant-Colonel M.B.K. Gordon
    - Battalion Second-in-Command: Major J.C. Cave
    - Adjutant: Captain G.W. Cote
    - Paymaster: Captain E.W. Haley (RCAPC)
    - Medical Officer: Captain T.W. Brokowski (RCAMC)
    - Signals Officer: Lieutenant T.C. Stevens (RCCS)
    - Intelligence Officer: Lieutenant H.D. Spielman
    - RHQ Troop Leader: Lieutenant I.A. MacArthur
  - HQ Squadron
    - Squadron Commander: Major F.H. Baldwin
    - Second-in-Command: Captain N.H. Welsh
    - Quartermaster: Lieutenant C.C. McLachlan
    - Technical Adjutant (Transport Officer): Captain R.F. Garrow
    - Assistant Adjutant: Lieutenant W.F. Grainger
    - Reconnaissance Troop Leader: Lieutenant G.A. Kraus
    - Intercommunication Troop Leader: Lieutenant D.H. Bradley
    - Anti-Air Troop Leader: Lieutenant N.H. Dann
  - A Squadron (4× Sherman Mk Vc "Firefly" Medium Tanks and 16× Sherman Mk III Medium Tanks)
    - "A" Squadron Headquarters Troop
      - Squadron Commander: Major E.W.L. Arnold
      - Second-in-Command: Captain B.M. Veilleux
      - Battle Captain: Captain K.Y. Dick
    - No. 1 Troop (Lieutenant J.H. Casey)
    - No. 2 Troop (Lieutenant M.J. Fitzpatrick)
    - No. 3 Troop (Lieutenant T.A.L. Windsor) (Executed as POW: 7 June 1944)
    - No. 4 Troop (Lieutenant A.R. Truax)
  - B Squadron (4× Sherman Mk Vc "Firefly" Medium Tanks and 16× Sherman Mk III Medium Tanks)
    - "B" Squadron Headquarters Troop
      - Squadron Commander: Major G.S. Mahon
      - Second-in-Command: Captain M.H. Bateman
      - Battle Captain: Captain J.H. Gilbert
    - No. 1 Troop (Lieutenant K.L. Steeves)
    - No. 2 Troop (Lieutenant W.N. Trenholme)
    - No. 3 Troop (Lieutenant L.N. Davies)
    - No. 4 Troop (Lieutenant S.W. Wood)
  - C Squadron (4× Sherman Mk Vc "Firefly" Medium Tanks and 16× Sherman Mk III Medium Tanks)
    - "C" Squadron Headquarters Troop
      - Squadron Commander: Major V.O. Walsh
      - Second-in-Command: Captain S.V. Radley-Walters
      - Battle Captain: Captain H.M. Belton
    - No. 1 Troop (Lieutenant E. Spafford)
    - No. 2 Troop (Lieutenant I.A. MacLean)
    - No. 3 Troop (Lieutenant N.S. Boyd)
    - No. 4 Troop (Lieutenant C.F. Thompson)
  - (Attached Officers) (No Firefly Detachment)
    - Rear Party Officer: Lieutenant W.R. Waterson
- (19th Field Regiment, RCA). (24× 105mm M7 Priest) (Attached from First Canadian Army Troops, fire support for 8th CIB landing)
  - (Battalion Headquarters)
    - Battalion Commander: Lieutenant-Colonel L.G. Clarke
    - Second-in-Command: Major A.B. Peene
    - Adjutant: Captain W.J. Hunstein
    - Technical Adjutant: Captain J.B. Walker
    - Quartermaster: Captain J.E. Porteous
    - Paymaster: Captain J. Mitchell (RCAPC)
    - Medical Officer: Captain W.R. Webster (RCAMC)
    - Ordnance Officer: Lieutenant F.K. Brown
    - Survey Officer: Lieutenant G.R. Malcolm
  - (55th Field Battery, RCA) (8× M7 Priest)
    - Battery Headquarters ( Major R.E. Mewburn)
    - "A" Troop (4× M7 Priest)
    - "B" Troop (4× M7 Priest)
  - (63rd Field Battery, RCA) (8× M7 Priest)
    - Battery Headquarters (Major R.S. Stronach)
    - "C" Troop (4× M7 Priest)
    - "D" Troop (4× M7 Priest)
  - (99th Field Battery, RCA) (8× M7 Priest)
    - Battery Headquarters ( Major R.S. Hetherington)
    - "E" Troop (4× M7 Priest)
    - "F" Troop (4× M7 Priest)
- No. 5 Canadian Field Company, RCE (Obstacle clearance: Attached from First Canadian Army Troops Engineers)
  - Company Commander: Major F.A. McTavish
  - R.O.1:
  - R.O.2:
  - No. 1 Platoon: Lieutenant D. Stalker (KIA: 6th June, 1944)
  - No. 2 Platoon
  - No. 3 Platoon: Lieutenant G.H. Madge
  - Rear Party Officer:

== British forces ==
British forces on Juno beach included units from Second Army and Combined Operations Headquarters They also provided the tri-service Beach groups that defended the beaches from air attack, directed the following waves and arranged casualty evacuation. The 79th Armoured division was the administrative division of the specialist assault and combat engineering vehicle units allocated to overcome the defences.

- HQ, 4th Special Service Brigade
  - No. 48 (Royal Marine) Commando
- Elements of 79th Armoured Division
  - "B" Squadron, 22nd Dragoons (Sherman Crab mine flail)
  - HQ, 5 Assault Regiment, Royal Engineers (Detachment)
    - 26 Assault Squadron, RE (Churchill AVRE)
    - 80 Assault Squadron, RE (Churchill AVRE)
    - 71st Field Company, RE (Attached)
- 3rd and 4th Batteries, 2nd Royal Marine Armoured Support Regiment (Centaur support tanks)
- Royal Armoured Corps
  - C Squadron, Inns of Court Regiment (armoured car unit tasked with rushing the bridges over the Orne River, south of Caen)
- HQ 7th GHQ Troops Engineers, Royal Engineers – Col F.C. Nottingham (Landed as sub-units distributed amongst assaulting formations and Beach Groups)
  - 65th Field Company, RE
  - 72nd Field Company, RE
  - 85th Field Company, RE
  - 184th Field Company, RE
  - 240th Field Company, RE
  - 262nd (Sussex) Field Company, RE (attached from XII Corps Troops, Royal Engineers; distributed as beach obstacle clearance parties with 3rd Canadian Division)
  - 582nd Field Company, RE
  - Platoon of 19th Field Company, RE (attached from I Corps Troops RE)
  - 297th Field Park Company, RE
  - 19th and 20th Stores Sections, RE
  - 59th and 61st Mechanical Equipment Sections, RE
  - 204th Works Section, RE
  - 670th and 710th Artisan Works Companies, RE
  - Two Advanced Park Sections of 176th Workshop and Park Company, RE
  - 48th Bomb Disposal Section, RE
  - 1033rd and 1034th Port Operating Companies, RE
  - 966th Inland Water Transport Operating Company, RE
  - 1622nd Bailey Platoon of 106th Bridge Company, Royal Army Service Corps (RASC)

102 Beach Sub-Area

- No. 7 Beach Group, Mike sector, including:
  - 8th (Irish) Battalion, King's Regiment
  - 'O' Anti-Aircraft Assault Group (from 80th Anti-Aircraft Brigade)
    - Regimental HQ 114th Light AA Regiment – Lt-Col N.W. Hoare
    - 372nd Battery, 114th LAA Regiment, less C Troop (Crusader AA tanks, 40mm Bofors)
    - 321st Battery, 93rd LAA Regiment, less E Troop (Crusader AA, 20 mm Polsten)
    - 274th Battery, 86th HAA Regiment
    - 1 Troop 383rd Battery, 86th HAA Regiment
    - 474th (Independent) Searchlight Battery, less B and C Troops
    - 112nd Company, Pioneer Corps, less detachments
    - 114th LAA Regiment Workshop, Royal Electrical and Mechanical Engineers (REME)
- No. 8 Beach Group, Nan sector, including:
  - 5th Battalion (Hackney Gurkhas) Royal Berkshire Regiment
  - 'P' AA Assault Group (from 80th AA Brigade)
    - Regimental HQ 86th (Honourable Artillery Company) Heavy AA Regiment – Lt-Col G.H. Champness
    - 273rd Battery, 86th HAA Regiment
    - 383rd Battery, 86th HAA Regiment less 1 Troop
    - 375th Battery, 114th LAA Regiment
    - 1 Troop 296th Battery, 73rd LAA Regiment
    - 1 Troop 321st Battery, 93rd LAA Regiment
    - 155th AA Operations Room
    - Detachment 112nd Pioneer Company
    - 86th HAA Regiment Workshop, REME
- In reserve No. 4 Beach Group

== Naval forces ==
Landing Force J was commanded by Commodore Geoffrey Oliver, RN. Among the chief vessels in this combined British and Canadian Force were

- HMS Hilary infantry landing and headquarters ship.

The force also included 109 Royal Canadian Navy vessels, among them:

- Two of the 11 destroyers in the bombardment group were RCN:
  - HMCS Algonquin
  - HMCS Sioux
- Landing Ships and others
  - HMCS Prince Henry - LSI(M)
  - HMCS Prince David - LSI(M)
  - HMS Invicta - LSI(S)
  - SS Isle of Thanet.
  - SS Mecklenburg.
  - Duke of Argyll. (Hospital ship)
  - HMS Ulster Monarch.
  - SS Canterbury.
  - SS Lairds Isle.
  - MV Llangibby Castle
  - HMS Queen Emma.
  - HMS Lawford (HQ ship, Assault Group J1) sunk 8 June.
  - HMS Waveney (HQ ship, Assault Group J2)
  - HMS Brigadier.
  - SS Clan Lamont
  - SS St. Helier
  - SS Lady of Mann
  - HMS Duke of Wellington
  - HMS Monowai - LSI(L)
  - SS Isle of Guernsey
  - HMS Royal Ulsterman (HQ ship, Assault Group J3)
  - HMS Northway - Casa Grande-class dock landing ship
- Escorts
  - HMS Wrestler (mined 06:45 on 6 June)
  - HMS Stevenstone,
  - HMS Venus
  - FFN La Combattante
  - HMS Beagle
- J1 Force
  - 102nd Flotilla - LCT
  - 4th Flotilla - LCT
  - 20th Flotilla - LCT
  - 31st Flotilla - LCT
- J2 Force
  - 36th Flotilla -LCT
  - 20th Flotilla - LCT
  - 103rd Flotilla - LCT

Landing craft from both the RN and RCN were employed in Force J, the total number were:

- 1 Landing Ship Headquarters
- 2 Assault Group Headquarters Ship
- 3 Landing Ships Infantry (Large)
- 3 Landing Ships Infantry (Medium)
- 12 Landing Ships Infantry (Hand Hoisting)
- 20 Landing Craft Infantry (Large)
- 8 Landing Craft Infantry (Small)
- 142 Landing Craft Assault
- 4 Landing Craft Assault (Obstacle Clearance)
- 18 Landing Craft Assault (Hedgerow)
- 8 Landing Craft Support (Medium)
- 4 Landing Craft Headquarters
- 22 Landing Ship Tank Mark II
- 2 Landing Craft Tank Mark III (Flotilla of 10 craft each)
- 7 Landing Craft Tank Mark IV (Flotilla of 10 craft each)
- 2 Landing Craft Tank Mark V/VI (Flotilla of 10 craft each)
- 7 Landing Craft Flak
- 7 Landing Craft Gun (Large)
- 7 Landing Craft Tank (Armoured)
- 8 Landing Craft Tank (High Explosive)
- 9 Landing Craft Tank (Rocket)
- 36 Landing Craft Personnel (Large) Smoke Layer
- 4 Landing Barge Flak
- 4 Landing Craft Support (Large) Mark I
- 3 Landing Craft Support (Large) Mark II
- 1 Landing Ship Dock
- 15 Rhino ferry

== German forces ==
Standing against the 3rd Canadian Infantry Division, units of 716.Infanterie-Division (Static) – Wehrmacht Heer Coastal Defence (Bodenständigen) had little tactical mobility and its personnel, in general, belonged to the lowest category of conscript, coming from older age groups or from the Landsturm: Military District 6. While the division in Normandy with the fewest personnel; fronting the Juno sector, its density of troops was a little stronger than elsewhere. The division had no combat experience before D-Day, and on 1 May 1944 it only had 7,771 personnel of all ranks.

The 716. Infanterie-Division consisted of:

- 716.Division – HQ Stab Gefechtsstand: Caen: La Folie-Couvrechef – Generalleutnant Wilhelm Richter
  - Nachrichten-Abteilung 716. Kdr Major Werner Liedloff (Signals)
- K.V.A. H1 / Küsten Verteidigung Abschnitt Caen. Kdr: Generalleutnant Wilhelm Richter. Gefechtsstand: Caen - La Folie-Couvrechef
  - Küsten Verteidigung Gruppe (KV Gruppe) Courseulles:
    - Küsten Verteidigung Unter Gruppe (KVU-Gr) Meuvaines: Major Lehman - Kdr Bataillon II. / 726. Gefechtsstand: St. Croix sur Mer (Bazenville)
    - K.V.U.-Gr. Seulles: Hauptmann Deptolla - Kdr Bataillon II. / 736. Gefechtsstand: Château de Tailleville at WN 23
  - K.V.-Gruppe. Riva-Bella: Oberst Ludwig Krug - Kdr Grenadier-Regiment 736. Gefechtsstand: Colleville-sur-Orne at WN 17 Höhe
    - K.V.U.-Gr. Orne: - Kdr Bataillon I. / 736. Gefechtsstand: Colleville-sur-Orne
    - K.V.U.-Gr. Luc: Major Pipor - Kdr Bataillon III. / 736. Gefechtsstand: Cresserons
- 716.Division – Artillerie-Regiment 1716.
  - Bataillon I. / 1716 AR. East of Orne: WN 17 Beauvais
    - Bttn 1. Merville WN01 - NW Gonneville-sur-Orne
    - Bttn 2. Southwest of Colleville-sur-Orne - At WN16
    - Bttn 3. East of Orne - At Brieville
    - Bttn 4. Southwest Ouistreham - Château d'Eau: At WN12
  - Bataillon II. / 1716 AR. Ouistreham: West of Crepon
    - Bttn 5. Between South Crepon and Bazenville: At WN36a
    - Bttn 6. La Mare-Fontaine: Between Crepon and Bazenville - At WN32
    - Bttn 7.(Resi) North le Moulin sur Mue - West Bény-sur-Mer: At WN28
  - Bataillon III. / 1716 AR. Northwest of Caen: NOT in 716 Inf.Div. Sector
    - Bttn 8 Not in 716 Div Sector: At Maisy La Martiniere - WN84 (352 Inf Div)
    - Bttn 9. Not in 716 Div Sector: At Maisy Les Perruques - WN83 (352 Inf Div)
    - Bttn 10. (Waldersee) At Plumetot - N.E. Bayeux
  - GHQ Heeres-schwere-Artillerie-Abteilung 989. (Heeresgruppe-Reserve Attached) Gefechtsstand: Northeast of Reviers.•
    - Batterie 1. / s.Art.-Abtl 989. Southwest of Basly - Moved to Bénouville (x4 12.2 cm sFH 396 (r))
    - Batterie 2. / s.Art.-Abtl 989. At Amblie - East of The Seulles (x4 12.2 cm sFH 396 (r))
    - Batterie 3. / s.Art.-Abtl 989. East of Creully (x4 12.2 cm sFH 396 (r))
  - Herres-Kusten-Artillerie-Abteilung 1260. (Attached) Gefechtsstand – Arromanches
    - 1. Bttr. / H.K.A. Abtl 1260. At St. Aubin-d'Arquenay: WN 08 - Ouistreham (x6 15.5 cm K 420 (f))
    - 2. Bttr. / H.K.A. Abtl 1260. East of Arromanches - Attached to 352. Inf.Div.
    - 3. Bttr. / H.K.A. Abtl 1260. At WN 35a - Mont Fleury (x4 12.2 cm K 390 (r))
    - 4. Bttr. (MKM) / H.K.A. Abtl 1260. At WN 48 - Longues (x4 15 cm TbtsK C/36)
    - Flak-Zug / H.K.A. Abtl 1260.
- Grenadier-Regiment 726. Oberst Walter Korfes Gefechtsstand : Château de Sully - Bayeux Attached to 352.Inf.-Div
  - Bataillon I./726. Stab & Kompanie 1/2/3/4 – Attached to 352.Inf.Div
  - Bataillon II./726. HQ Stab. Gefechtsstand: At Ste-Croix-sur-Mer: KVU-Gr Meuvaines
    - Kompanie 5./II. East of Tierceville, North of Colombiers-sur-Seulles
    - Kompanie 6./II. At Bazenville, Northwest of Villiers-le-Sec
    - Kompanie 7./II. West of Banville, South of Ste-Croix-sur-Mer
    - Kompanie 8.(schwere) /II. South of Crepon, North of Creully
  - Bataillon III./726. Stab & Kompanie 9/10/11/12 – Grandcamp-les-Bains: Attached to 352.Inf.Div
  - Bataillon IV./726. 439.Ost-Battalion: Attached to 352.Inf.Div
  - 14(PaK) Kompanie. At Hameau de Vaux - Behind Vaux-Le Buisson
- Grenadier-Regiment 736. Oberst Ludwig Krug Stab: Colleville-sur-Orne
  - Bataillon I./736. Stab I. Gefechtsstand: Ouistreham – Kdr KVU-Gr Orne. Kompanie 1/2/3/4 - (Riva Bella - UK Sword Sector)
  - Bataillon II./736. Stab II. Gefechtsstand: Château de Tailleville – Kdr KVU-Gr Seulles (WN 23)
    - Kompanie 5./ II. KoKdr Hauptmann Rudolf Grute
      - Zug - At Bernières-sur-Mer: WN 28 and WN28a
      - Zug / Stab Gruppen - At Saint Aubin-sur-Mer: WN 27
    - Kompanie 6./ II. KoKdr Hauptmann Grote
      - Zug - At Courseulles-sur-Mer EAST: WN 29
      - Zug - At Courseulles-sur-Mer WEST: WN 31
      - Zug-Gruppen - At Courseulles-sur-Mer SOUTH: WN 30
    - Kompanie 7./ II. La Rivière and Ver-sur-Mer (WN 33 UK Gold)
    - Kompanie 8.(schwere)/ II. Bn Reserve: Field Position – Les Ruines Saint-Ursin (La Tombette)
  - Bataillon III./736. Stab III. Gefechtsstand: Cresserons – Kdr KVUGr Luc (KVGr Riva Bella: UK Sword Sector)
    - Kompanie 9./ III. Langrunne-sur-Mer and Luc-sur-Mer (WN 24 UK Sword)
    - Kompanie 10./ III. Lion-sur-Mer and Hermanville-sur-Mer (WN 20 UK Sword)
    - Kompanie 11./ III. Bn Reserve: South of Tailleville - Northwest of Cresserons
    - Kompanie 12./ III. Bn Reserve: North of Douvres (WN 23a) and la-Délivrande (WN 22) (UK Sword)
  - Bataillon IV./736. 642. Ost-Battalion: Stab: Amfreville – Kompanie 1/2/3/4 (KV-Gr Riva Bella UK Sword)
  - 14(PaK) Kompanie: Luc-sur-Mer and Lion-sur-Mer (UK Sword)
- Ost-Battalion 441 (Ukrainian). (Attached) Stab: de Mars-Fontaine, SW Ver-sur-Mer
  - Einsatzfaehig - KVU-Gr. Seulles: Infanterie-Division 716. (Anlandungen: CA Juno)
    - Kompanie 2. (Jagdkommando-Kp. 52) Bn Reserve: Southeast of Courseulles-sur-Mer, At Les Rotys,
  - Einsatzfaehig - KVU-Gr. Meuvaines: Infanterie-Division 352. (Anlandungen: UK Gold)
    - Kompanie 1. (Ukrainer-Kp. 52) Hameau de Vaux (Aerium de Graye - Le Buisson) at WN 33a
    - Kompanie 3. West of Ver-sur-Mer, At Le Hable de Heurtot
    - Kompanie 4. East of Ver-sur-Mer
- Panzerjäger-Abteilung 716. Gefechtsstand: Oberleutnant Kurt Kaergel – Biéville
  - Kompanie 1. (Sfl) / Pz.Jg-Abt 716. Gefechtsstand: At la Croix de Bois Biéville - North of Caen,
  - Kompanie 2. (StuG) / Pz.Jg-Abt 716. Gefechtsstand: At Reviers
    - Zug - Graye-sur-Mer - Hameau de la Valette: x3 7.5 cm Pak 40
    - Zug - Courseulles-sur-Mer South - Les Champs des Fers: x3 7.5 cm Pak 40
    - Zug - Berniers-sur-Mer - Les Perrucques: x2 8.8 cm Pak 43/41
  - Kompanie 3. (FlaK) / Pz.Jg-Abt 716. Gefechtsstand: At Sallenelles
    - Zug - At Tailleville la Tomblette: x6 7.5 cm D.C.A. Mle 1938(f) AA Guns.
    - Zug - At Tailleville la Tomblette: x20 3.2 cm Wurfgerät 40/41 Packkiste.
    - Zug - At Anisy. on trailers:2 cm Flak 30/38/Flakvierling
- Pionier-Bataillon 716. Gefechtsstand: Herouvillette-Haras
  - Kompanie 1. Hérouvillette, Northeast of Caen
  - Kompanie 2. Detached to 352.Inf.Div and Garrisoned: At Anisy / Mathieu
  - Kompanie 3. Detached to 352.Inf.Div
- Schnelle-Brigade 30 / 716. Heeresgruppe-Reserve (Ersatzheer). Gefechtsstand: Coutances. Commander: Oberstleutnant H.F. von und Aufsess
  - Schnelle-Abteilung 513 [Bicycle]. attached 06.06.1944 - Gefechtsstand: at Coutances (West of St.Lo)
  - Schnelle-Abteilung 517 [Bicycle]. attached 06.06.1944 - Gefechtsstand: at Bréhal (South West of St.Lo)
  - Schnelle-Abteilung 518 [Bicycle]. attached 06.06.1944 - Gefechtsstand: at Cérences (South West of St.Lo)
- 716.Division – Divisional Troops.
  - 716.Division – Versorgungs-truppen 716. (Supply)
  - 716.Division – Verwaltungs-zug 716. (Food Services)
  - 716.Division – Sanitäts-Btl 716. (Medical)
  - 716.Division - Nachschub-Btl 716. (Transportation)

Panzer-Division 21., belonging to XXXXVII Pz.Gr. West, was allocated to Army Group B as its only reserve. (Note: Pz.Div.21 was reconstituted on 15 July 1943, in the reorganization of schnellen Brigade West (SB 931). Pz.Div.21 was absent from Normandy from March 1944, for Operation Maragretha, in Hungary, until May 1944, when it was reassigned to Brittany, and then moved up into Normandy. On 6 June 1944, Panzer-Division 21., on its initiative, adopted a 'new' organization for battle, as Regimental (Brigade) Groups were formed, PzKGr.Oppeln - Pz.Regt.22., and KGr.Luck - Pz.Gren-Regt 125., they regrouping an infantry battalion for a tank battalion, and KGr.Rauch - Pz.Gren-Regt192., was formed, given Panzer-Artillerie-Regiment 155., assigned a battalion to each Kampfgruppe.) The Canadians, coming South, from Juno Beach, did not experience a direct impact from either PzKGr.Oppeln or Kampfgruppe Luck and only felt a slight impact, in their area of influence, from the counter-move undertaken by Kampfgruppe Rauch, on 6 June.

- Panzer-Division.21. Gefechtsstand: St. Pierre-sur-Dives (Begleitkompanie)
  - GOC Kommandeur: Generalmajor Edgar Feuchtinger
  - Panzer-Aufklärung-Abteilung. 21. Gefechtsstand: SE of Condé-sur-Noireau: x5 Kompanien (some tanks)
- Panzer-Regiment. 22. (former Pz.Regt.100.) Gefechtsstand: Aubigny (with Pz.FlaK-Ko.)
  - Kdr: Oberst Hermann von Oppeln-Bronikowski (PzKGr. Oppeln: North of Caen - West of Orne – from 6 June 1944)
  - I. Btl. /Pz.Regt. 22. Stab: Jort (Saint Piere-sur-Dives) StabsKo & Pz.Kompanien: 1. 2. 3. 4.
  - II. Btl. /Pz.Regt. 22. Stab: Fresné-la-Mère (Falaise) StabsKo & Pz.Kompanien: 5. 6. 7. 8.
- Panzer-Grenadier-Regiment. 125(tgp) Gefechtsstand: Vimont (Stabs Ko.)
  - Kdr: (Baron) Major Freiherr Hans von Luck (KGr. Luck: East of Orne – from 6 June 1944)
  - I. Btl. (Gepanzert) Stab: Fierville-la-Campagne: Kompanien (SPW) 1. 2. 3. & Kompanien 4.(sch)
  - II. Btl. (Motorized) Stab: Colombelles:
    - Kompanien (Mot.) 5. Northwest of Troarn
    - Kompanien (Mot.) 6. Les Carrieres - North of Chateau Bannevilles-les-Campagnes
    - Kompanien (Mot.) 7. Rainville
    - Kompanien 8.(sch) East of Colombelles
  - 9. Kompanie (s.IG) /125. Colombelles
  - 10. Kompanie (s-Werfer) /125. Colombelles
- Panzer-Grenadier-Regiment. 192 (mot.) Gefechtsstand: Thury-Harcourt (Stabs Ko.)
  - Kdr: Oberst Josef Rauch (KGr. Rauch: Northwest of Caen – From 06.06.44)
  - I. Btl. (Gepanzert) Stab: Verson: Kompanien (SPW) 1. 2. 3. 4.
  - II. Btl. (Motorized) HQ Stab: Le Mesnil (Anisy) (13 May) Stabs Ko: Villons-les-Buissons
    - Kompanien 5. (Mot.) At Château la Londe, Northeast of Epron (verst.)
    - Kompanien 6. (Mot.) Buron
    - Kompanien 7. (Mot.) North of Périers-sur-le-Dan (Hermanville) (verst.) Southeast of Plumetot
    - Kompanien 8. (sch.) At Cairon and then KUGr Braatz – Bénouville Caen Canal Bridge
  - 9. Kompanie (s.IG)/192. At Croisilles
  - 10. Kompanie (Werfer)/192. At Thury-Harcourt
- Panzer- Artillerie-Regiment. 155. Gefechtsstand: St. André-sur-Orne
  - Kdr: Oberst Hühne
  - I. Btl./155. Gefechtsstand – Mathieu:
    - Bttn 1. (sfl) Northwest of Beuville
    - Bttn 2. (Mot.) West of Périers-sur-le-Dan (WN 21a)
    - Bttn 3. (SPW) Northwest of Colomby-sur-Thaon
  - II. Btl./155. Gefechtsstand – May-sur-Orne: 4. Bttn. / 5. Bttn. / 6. Bttn.
  - III. Btl./155. Gefechtsstand – Thury-Harcourt: 7. Bttn. / 8. Bttn. / 9. Bttn.
  - 10. Batterien (gp). (s.Werfer)
  - Heeres-Flakartillerie-Abteilung. (H.-Flak-Abtl.) 305. Gefechtsstand: Hérouville Kdr: Hauptmann Ohlendorf
    - 1. Bttn. SE of Caen
    - 2. Bttn. West of Caen
    - 3. Bttn. At St. Pierre sur Dives
    - 4. Bttn.
    - 5. Bttn.
  - Heeresflakabt.200.
    - I. Bttn. Flak
    - II. Bttn. Flak
    - III Bttn. gemischte Flak
- Sturmgeschütz-Abteilung 200 (Stug.-Abtl. 200) Gefechtsstand: Quetteville
  - Batterien. 1.
  - Batterien. 2.
  - Batterien. 3.
  - Batterien. 4.
  - Batterien (Ko) 5. / Stug.-Abtl. 200. From Cambes-en-Plasne at Epron- North of Caen
- Panzerjäger-Abteilung 200 (Pz.Jg.-Abtl. 200). Kdr: Hauptmann Werner von Lyncker, Stab: Saint-Pierre (Maison des Trois Chimnees) Tilly-sur-Seulles
  - Kompanie 1.(sfl) / Pz.Jg.ABt 200. Stab: Châteux de Grand-Tonne, At Sainte-Croix- Grand-Tonne (Martagny)
  - Kompanie 2.(sfl) / Pz.Jg.ABt200. Stab: Château du Mesnil-Patry, At Le Mesnil-Patry (Putot)
  - Kompanie 3.(sfl) / Pz.Jg.ABt 200. Stab: Camilly, South of Le Fresnet-Camilly
- Panzer-Pionier-Bataillon 220. Gefechtsstand: Clécy -Saint-Remy
  - Pz.Pi.Kompanie 1.(SPW) /220. At Quesnay, Northeast of Falaise
  - Pz.Pi.Kompanie 2.(SPW) /220. Gaillon and Vernon, Southeast of Rouen (Detached)
  - Pi Kompanie 3. (Mot.) /220. At Creully, Northeast of Bayeau
  - Pi.Zug Brücken-(Brüko) Kolonne
- Pz.Div.21 – Divisions-Einheiten
  - Pz. Nachschubtruppen 200.
  - Pz. Nachrichtenabteilung 200.
  - Pz. Feld-Ersatz.Bataillon 200. Gefechtsstand: Condé-sur-Noireau – Stab & Kompanien 1. 2. 3. 4.
