= Waveney =

Waveney may refer to:

- River Waveney, a river that forms the boundary between Suffolk and Norfolk, England
- Waveney District, a local government district in Suffolk, England
- Waveney (UK Parliament constituency)
- Waveney class lifeboat, a class of lifeboat operated by the Royal National Lifeboat Institution between 1964 and 1999
- HMS Waveney (1903), a River-class destroyer
- Waveney Valley Line, a branch line running from Tivetshall in Norfolk to Beccles in Suffolk
- Robert Adair, 1st Baron Waveney 1811–1886 British Liberal Party politician

== People with the given name ==
- Waveney Bicker Caarten (1902-1990), an English playwright

== See also ==
- HMS Waveney, a list of ships of the Royal Navy
- Empire Waveney, an Empire ship built 1929
