= 14th Luftwaffe Field Division =

German infantry division during World War II

14th Luftwaffe Field Division (14. Luftwaffen-Felddivision)
- Active: Late 1942 – 1945
- Country: Germany
- Branch: Luftwaffe then Army
- Type: Infantry
- Size: Division
- Part of: XXXIII Army Corps
- Garrison/HQ: Norway and Denmark
- Engagements: World War II

Commanders
- Notable commanders: Wilhelm Richter

The 14th Luftwaffe Field Division (14. Luftwaffen-Felddivision) was a Luftwaffe Field Division of the Wehrmacht during World War II. It was transferred to the German Army in November 1943 as the 14th Field Division (L) and spent its entire operational existence on occupation duties in Norway and Denmark. It saw no ground combat during its period of service.

== History ==
In 1942, Adolf Hitler authorised the creation of Luftwaffe field divisions using surplus ground crew. This was done, rather than transferring these men to the German Army, because Hermann Göring personally intervened with Hitler, stating that he was concerned that his men's "fine National Socialist attitudes" would be contaminated. This decision ultimately led to the commitment of many of these inadequately trained divisions mainly to the Eastern Front, where they suffered heavy casualties.

The 14th Luftwaffe Field Division was formed in late 1942 from the 61st Air Regiment. Despite not having completed its training or having been fully equipped, the division was sent to German-occupied Norway in January 1943, in order to replace the 196th Infantry Division, which was being shifted to the Eastern Front. The 14th Luftwaffe Field Division initially garrisoned the Mo area, near Bergen, and was transferred to the German Army on 1 November 1943 as the 14th Field Division (L). It was later deployed to the Jutland Peninsula in Denmark. In mid-1944 it was transferred back to Norway and was deployed in the Nordland region, under the control of XXXIII Army Corps, and remained in Norway until the end of the war, when it was disbanded.

== Organization ==
The following units made up the division:

- 27th Luftwaffe Field Regiment
- 28th Luftwaffe Field Regiment
- 14th Luftwaffe Field Artillery Regiment
- 14th Luftwaffe Tank Destroyer Battalion
- 14th Luftwaffe Bicycle Battalion
- 14th Luftwaffe Engineer Company
- 14th Luftwaffe Signal Company
- 14th Luftwaffe Field Divisional Supply Troops

The 4th Luftwaffe Field Artillery Battalion of the 14th Luftwaffe Field Artillery Regiment became the 1st Motorised Flak Battalion of the 15th Motorised Flak Regiment in October 1943.

== Commanders ==
The following officers commanded the division:

- Generalmajor (from 28 November 1942) Generalleutnant Gunther Lohmann (after 1 September 1943)
- Generalleutnant Wilhelm Richter (from 1 February 1945)
