= 716th Static Infantry Division =

716th (Static) Infantry Division
- German: 716. (bodenständige) Infanterie-Division
- Divisional insignia
- Active: 2 May 1941 – May 1945
- Country: Nazi Germany
- Branch: Heer
- Type: Infantry
- Role: Coastal defence and fortification
- Size: Division
- Engagements: Invasion of Normandy

Commanders
- Notable commanders: Wilhelm Richter

The 716th Static Infantry Division (German: 716. Infanterie-Division) was a German World War II infantry division. It was raised on May 2, 1941, and sent to German-occupied France in June 1941. Many of the division's troops were elderly Germans and conscripts from other German-occupied countries. The division also had some young German conscripts as well. As a bodenständig (static unit), it was not equipped with the standard configuration of vehicles and heavy weapons. Much of the division's artillery and anti-tank guns were from captured armaments.

It is well-known for its involvement as a defensive unit in the Allied Normandy landings on 6 June 1944.

== Divisional history ==
The 716th Infantry Division was mobilized for occupation duties in the 15th Wave Replacement Army on 2 May 1941 in Wehrkreis VI in Munster. After formation in Bielefeld, and transfer to Occupied France, it was assigned to AOK 15 in June 1941 and employed at Saint-Lo and Soissons. It was transferred to the 7th Army in June 1942 and relocated to Normandy, with duties including coastal defence, air raid protection and defensive fortification construction. After short movements to Amiens and Brussels it returned to the divisions in Normandy. The 716th Division had no combat experience, and was one of the weakest divisions in the area.

On D-Day, the division was responsible for the Divisional Coastal Defensive Section KVA Caen. Having the task of defeating landings, it manned an extended line of defensible posts, along its assigned 47 km of Normandy Coast, and deployed all other unit resources then available above the Lower Normandy Calvados-Seine Bay Coastal Plain. Fighting with additionally allocated LXXXIV Corps resources, the tactical situation and the terrain saw the Division 'split' across two Regimental Coastal Defensive Sections: Coastal Defense Group Courseulles and Coastal Defense Group Riva-Bella. To the west, Coastal Defense Group Courseulles commanded all divisional troops from Asnelles to Saint-Aubin-sur-Mer, seeing it attempt to defeat landings at Gold Beach and Juno Beach. In the east up to the AOK 7 / AOK 15 Boundary, Coastal Defense Group Riva-Bella commanded the tactical situation from Langrune-sur-Mer to Le Home Varaville, becoming responsible to defeat landings at Sword Beach and by the British 6th Airborne Division; astride the River Orne.

During the fighting after D-Day, the division fought defensively around Caen and Villers-Bocage. According to the commanding officer Generalleutnant Wilhelm Richter, "My division had been defeated and badly beaten up in Normandy". The division was removed from frontline duty on July 10, 1944, and was able to avoid the carnage of the Falaise Pocket. Redeployed to southern France, the division took up coastal security positions in the region of Salses-Perpignan-Elne, close to the Spanish border. Thereafter, the division was ordered to withdraw on August 19, 1944, and retreated through Languedoc to the region around Lyon. After this movement the division was engaged by the French resistance before later arriving in the area of Sélestat in Alsace.

In October 1944, the 716th Infantry Division was in the region of Oberrhein (near Colmar) where it fought at Neunkirch-Obenhein and was nearly wiped out in heavy fighting in January 1945. The remains of the division was reconstituted as the 716th Volksgrenadier Division in April 1945 before surrendering to American troops at Kempten in May 1945.

== Order of battle ==
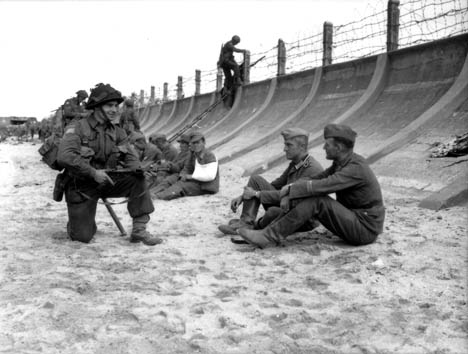
716th Division captives on D-Day, under the guard of a Canadian soldier from the Régiment de la Chaudière.

The 716th's complement when raised in 1941 was:

- Divisional Staff
- 726 Infantry Regiment
- 736 Infantry Regiment
- 716 Artillery Regiment
- 716 Panzerjäger Company
- 716 Pioneer Battalion
- 716 Signals Battalion
- 716 Supply Troops
- Administration Platoon

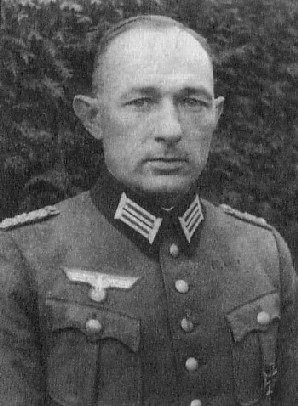
General Wilhelm Richter, commander of the division during the 1944 Normandy Campaign.

The 716th's complement during the June 1944 Normandy Campaign consisted of:

- Command
- 726th Grenadier Regiment (439th Ost Battalion)
- 736th Grenadier Regiment (642nd Ost Battalion)
- 1716th Artillery Battalion
- 716th Antitank Battalion
- 716th Engineer Battalion
- 716th Signals Battalion
- 716th Fusilier Battalion
- 441st Ost Battalion

== Commanders ==
- Oberst Otto Matterstock: 1941 to April 1943
- Generalleutnant Wilhelm Richter: April 1943 − May 1944
- Generalmajor Ludwig Krug (1894–1972): May 1944
- Generalleutnant Wilhelm Richter: June − August 1944
- Generalmajor Otto Schiel (1895–1990): August − September 1944
- Generalleutnant Wilhelm Richter: September 1944
- Oberst Ernst von Bauer (1896–1945): September − December 1944
- Generalmajor Wolf Ewert (1905–1994): December 1944 – April 1945
- Oberst Friedrich Trompeter: April 1945
