= Earl Alexander Olmsted =

Canadian Army officer (1914–2008)

Earl Alexander Olmsted, C.D.
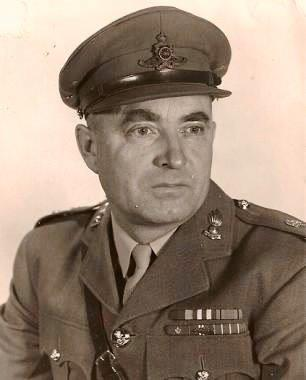
- Born: 22 July 1914; Ottawa, Ontario
- Died: 10 November 2008 (aged 94)
- Burial place: Ottawa, Ontario
- Military career
- Allegiance: Canada
- Branch: Canadian Army
- Service years: 1939–1965
- Rank: Lieutenant Colonel
- Commands: 13 Field, RCA
- Conflicts: World War II
- Awards: Mentioned in Despatches; Canadian Forces' Decoration (1st Clasp)

Lieutenant Colonel Earl Alexander Olmsted C.D. (22 July 1914 – 10 November 2008) was a Canadian Army officer who held command positions (3rd Canadian Infantry Division Headquarters) and led artillery units (13th Field Regiment, RCA) during World War II, serving in the European theatres. After WWII he served as a Senior Operations Officer with the North American Aerospace Defense Command (NORAD) and was the National Secretary of the Canadian Army Benevolent Fund. His notable military career spanned 27 years and included postings on several continents.

== Early life ==
Earl Alexander Olmsted was born in Ottawa at the start of WWI in 1914. He was the first member of his extended family to receive a university degree from St. Patrick's College in Ottawa. He had always wanted to attend Queen's University but was unable to do so because of financial constraints caused by the Great Depression. He met his wife Marjorie Kingsland (Salter) Olmsted at Parkdale United Church in Ottawa, Ontario – they would remain together for over 70 years.

== World War II ==
Olmsted joined the Canadian Army in October 1939, shortly after Britain declared war on Germany. He was commissioned Second Lieutenant, First Field Brigade, Royal Canadian Artillery (RCA). He was assigned to the artillery because of his apparently strong mathematical skills; prior to the outbreak of war he had worked as an accounting clerk. After being shipped overseas, Olmsted served with an anti-aircraft unit, presumably defending Britain from aerial Luftwaffe attacks during the Blitz.

Between February 1943 – May 1943 he attended the Royal Military College Canadian War Staff Course in Kingston, Ontario. Lt.-Col. A.J. Creighton indicated that "[Olmsted] is best suited for employment in close touch with fighting troops". Olmsted returned to England and was billeted in Aldershot in preparation for the invasion of France.

Olmsted participated in Operation Overlord as a recently promoted G-III Staff Captain aboard the Canadian headquarters ship HMS Hilary. He landed on Juno Beach just before noon on June 6, leading a party that included war correspondents and other senior Canadian military personnel. After rendezvousing with Canadian H.Q., Major-General R.F.L. Keller (Rod Keller) ordered Olmsted forward on motorcycle to connect with Brigadier Harry Wickwire Foster, who was commanding the 7th Canadian Brigade. Communications at the time were unreliable and there was concern that the unit was in danger of being cut off. Olmsted's personal D-Day accounts were later used in the book "The Longest Day" by Cornelius Ryan, which was eventually turned into a movie starring John Wayne. Excerpts from Olmsted's account include:

"The Channel was very choppy. Many were seasick on the HQ Ship. About 3 Miles from shore we got onboard Landing Craft Assaults (LCAs). The trip to the shore was quite rough and a number of waves broke over the LCA."

"[The LCA landed] about one mile East of Courselles-Sur-Mer at approximately 11:00 hours 6 Jun. 1944. Everyone was eager and anxious to get going. No adverse rumours. All were extremely confident of the outcome."

"Nothing was funny. Dead cattle all over the place. Civilians were very nervous and terrified of the Germans. Casualties were heavy. Weather warm on shore. Cloudy but dry day. We landed about 1.5 Miles from the spot we were supposed to land and had to walk to our HQ selected location"

"...I was most impressed with the calm atmosphere around HQ. Everyone knew his job and was doing it well. Communications were not as good as they might have been and I rode forward to HQ 7 [Brigade] on a motorcycle to obtain information. I was amazed to go through large areas where there were no troops and where everything was deserted"

After D-Day Olmsted was put on Regimental duty with the 13th Canadian Field Regiment, RCA, serving with this unit through France, Holland, Belgium and Germany until the end of hostilities. In April 1945, he was promoted to the rank of Major. The 13th Field was an Alberta-based artillery Regiment consisting of three four-gun troops. The Regiment primarily utilized 25-pound howitzer artillery pieces during operations. Olmsted performed a variety of roles in the 13th Field, notably leading the Regiment during the Battle of the Scheldt. Olmsted was slightly injured in Germany, when his jeep was hit by a German artillery shell after stopping to converse with a motorcycle courier. The driver of the jeep and the motorcycle courier were both fatally injured in the attack, while Olmsted survived mostly unscathed. In another incident the Buffalo amphibious Landing Vehicle Tracked (LVT) he was riding in struck a submerged telephone pole and sank. He and the other crew were forced to abandon the vehicle and were stranded overnight on a small island until they were rescued.:

== Post-War ==
Olmsted continued his service with the Canadian Army long after WWII. In 1956 he was promoted to Lieutenant-Colonel and went on to become a Senior Operations Officer with the newly formed North American Aerospace Defense Command (NORAD). He played a senior role at Fort Churchill, Manitoba and oversaw activities including ballistic missile testing. After leaving military service he became the National Secretary of the Canadian Army Benevolent Fund and became a Knight of the Order of Saint Lazarus in Canada.

== Decorations, campaign stars, medals and other awards ==
1939–45 Star; France and Germany Star; Defence Medal; Canadian Volunteer Service Medal and Clasp; War Medal 1939–1945; Mentioned in Despatches, Canadian Forces' Decoration with 1st Clasp.
