= Wilhelm Richter =

WW2 German general (1892-1971)

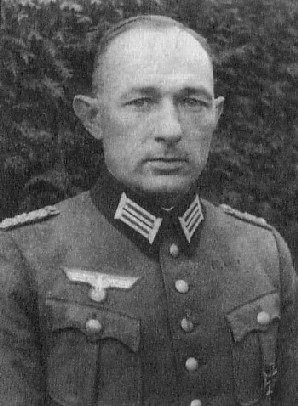
- Born: Friedrich-Wilhelm Richter; 1892; Hirschberg, German Empire
- Died: 1971 (aged 79)
- Allegiance: German Empire; Weimar Republic; Nazi Germany
- Service years: 1913–1945
- Rank: Generalleutnant
- Commands: 716th Infantry Division; 14th Luftwaffe Field Division
- Conflicts: World War II; Invasion of Poland; Battle of France; Operation Barbarossa

Friedrich-Wilhelm Richter (1892–1971) was a general in the Wehrmacht during World War II. He is most notable for commanding the 716th Infantry Division during the D-Day Landings in June 1944.

Richter was a son of the Lord Mayor of Hirschberg and Frankfurt an der Oder Georg Richter (1853–1925). In 1913, one year before the beginning of the First World War, he joined the German army at the age of 21. He participated in battles of the First World War. After 1918 he remained in the army and continued his military career in the reduced and disarmed Reichswehr.

In 1937 Richter received an order for the 30th Artillery Regiment of the Wehrmacht. He took part in the Polish campaign in 1939 and in the west campaign in 1940. In 1941 he fought on the Eastern Front against the Soviet Union. In March 1943 he took command of the 716th Infantry Division in Normandy, whose job was to protect the French coast against an Allied amphibious assault. Richter's section lay west of Bayeux, where the 352nd Infantry Division was stationed from May 1944, and east of Caen.

When the invasion took place on 6 June 1944, Richter's troops fought against Canadians and British who had landed on the invasion beach Juno Beach in France. By 15 June 1944 Richter's division had lost sixty percent of its soldiers.

The 716th I.D. was then withdrawn from the front, reorganized and replenished with men and material. In September 1944, after the Battle of Normandy, Richter lost command of the 716th Infantry Division and instead took over the 14th Field Division (L) in occupied Norway, where he survived the war without seeing further combat. He died in 1971 at the age of 79.

Richter's headquarters and bunkers have served as a museum since 1991.
