= HMS Waveney =

Three ships of the Royal Navy have borne the name HMS Waveney, after the River Waveney:

- HMS Waveney (1903) was a River-class destroyer launched in 1903 and sold in 1920.
- HMS Waveney (K248) was a River-class frigate launched in 1942 and broken up in 1947.
- HMS Waveney (M2003) was a River-class minesweeper launched in 1983. She was sold to the Bangladesh Navy in 1994 and was renamed Shapla.
