= Beach groups =

Beach Group (Brick)
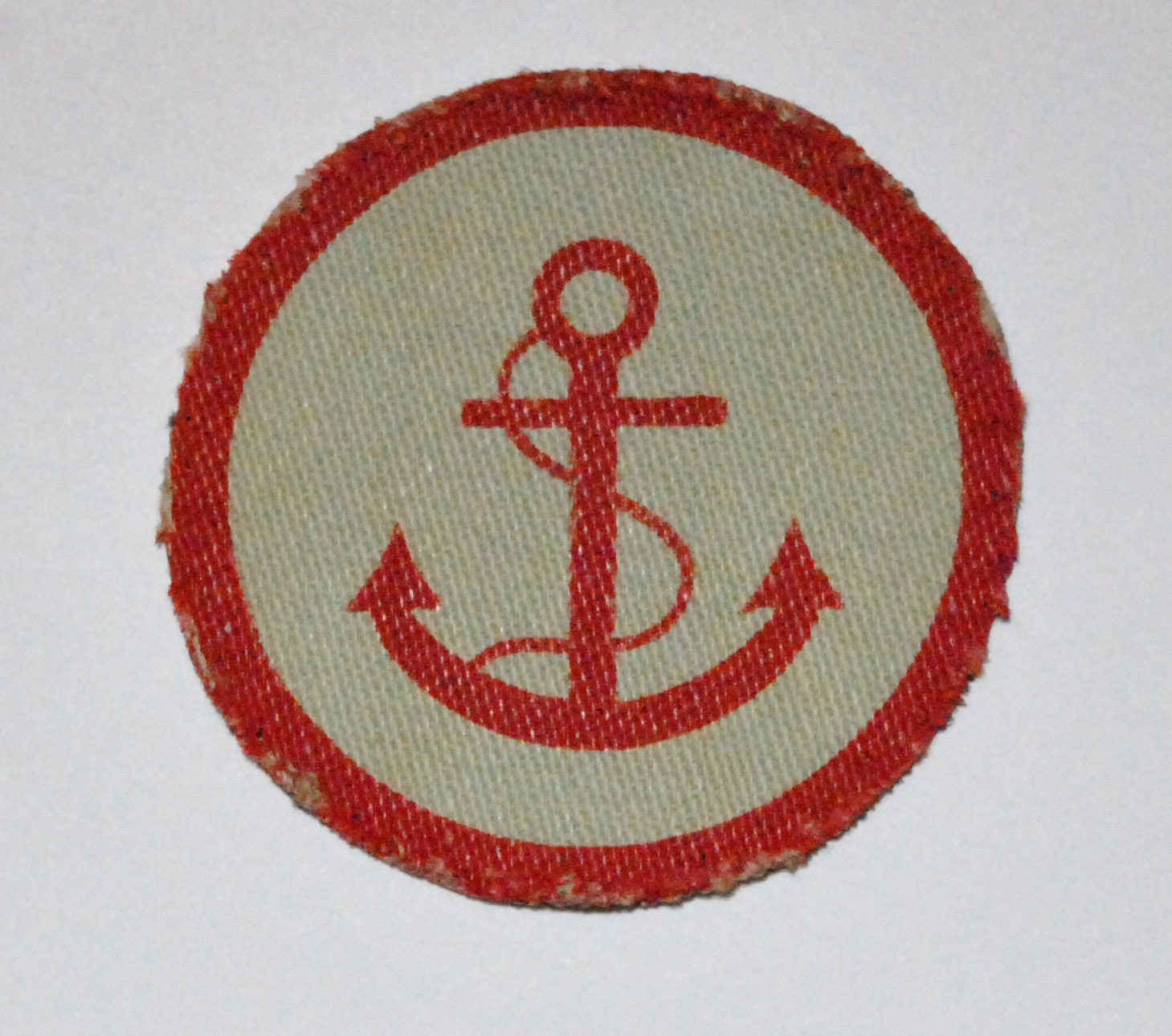
- Shoulder insignia worn by beach groups
- Active: 1943–1944
- Country: Britain
- Branch: Tri-Service
- Role: Beachhead organisation
- Size: Brigade
- Engagements: Sicily Landings; Salerno; Normandy Landings

Insignia
- Patch worn by beach commandos

During the Second World War, the Allies realised the need for the landing zone of an amphibious assault to be organised for the efficient passage of follow on forces. The British formed such units from all three services – the Royal Navy (Commandos), British Army and the Royal Air Force, with the Army component comprising Infantry, Engineers, Ordnance, Royal Electrical and Mechanical Engineers, Medical and Service Corps.

The equivalent U.S. units were called "beach battalions."

== Formation ==
After the Operation Torch landings, the need for a beach organisation became apparent for the larger planned operations. Beach Groups were formed in the UK and began to train in Scotland. In the Mediterranean, the equivalent organisations were called Beach Bricks and were formed in Egypt and trained at Kabrit. The Chief of Combined Operations Lord Louis Mountbatten described the functions of a beach group in late 1942:

- Arrange and control the movement of all personnel and vehicles from the landing craft to inland assembly areas.
- Move stores from ships' holds and craft to dumps in the beach maintenance areas.
- Develop and organise the beaches and beach maintenance area in regard to defence, movement and administration, including the evacuation of all casualties and recovery of vehicles.
- Provide the beach signal organisation.
- The removal to the UK of casualties, prisoners of war and salvaged equipment.
- The creation of dumps to hold petrol, ammunition and rations that were being landed.
- Assembly areas for the arriving personnel and their vehicles.

For this, a tri-service formation was created around an infantry battalion, added to this were smaller units from the Royal Engineers, Royal Army Medical Corps, Royal Electrical and Mechanical Engineers, Royal Army Ordnance Corps, Royal Pioneer Corps, Royal Army Service Corps and the Corps of Military Police. The Navy provided Royal Naval Beach Commandos and a signal unit, and the Royal Air Force provided for beach anti-aircraft defence. The complement of a Beach group or brick was up to 3,000 men.

The beach commandos were composed of 76 officers and men, led by the one Principal Beach Master and three Beach Masters, who would land with the assaulting troops and have the following duties:

- Marking the limits of the beachhead
- Set up a protected area for the beach commander to operate from
- Calling in landing craft to the beach via radio, signal lamp or loud-hailer.
- Unloading landing craft according to priority.
- Providing salvage parties to recover damaged landing craft, stores and equipment.
- Providing fire fighting parties, using modified DUKWs
- Ensuring personnel and equipment could move through the beachhead as quickly as possible
- Mooring landing craft correctly

Each commando, which was to control the landing area for a brigade, was subdivided into a headquarters and three sub units (Beach Parties), each controlling a battalion landing area. The men wore army battledress with navy headgear. Nine beach commandos were formed for Operation Overlord, designated F, J, L, P, Q, R, S, T and W, the latter was composed of Canadians.

The Royal Navy Beach Signals units were to provide communications between the beach and the offshore forces. Included in the units were men from the army and RAF.

The infantry component was intended to be a fighting force if any pockets of resistance remained on the beach immediately after the landings. After the beach had been secured, the battalion was to provide manpower for any other tasks, for example 6th Battalion Border Regiment was split up as follows,

- A and D Companies - beach companies
- B Company - a labour unit of the ammunition section of the beach ordnance detachment
- C Company - reserve
- S Company - (the Universal Carrier, mortar and anti-tank platoons), to provide labour for the petrol depot.

As well as the treatment and dispatch of casualties back to Britain, the Medical Corps was also tasked with the provision of drinking water for the troops.

The Military Police (MPs) were to be used to control the flow of traffic on the beach and to guard and document the prisoners of war collected in the initial stages and brought back to the beach. These units also included RAF MPs.

The pioneer companies were called on to perform many duties; construction of roads, air-fields and stores, mine clearance, collection and evacuation of wounded, collection and burial of the dead, transport, guarding POWs and, where necessary, fight.

The RASC was responsible for the transport and distribution of the supplies needed by the troops.

The REME was tasked with keeping the beaches clear of disabled vehicles, including the removal of stranded landing craft. Repairable vehicles were repaired in place or at a vehicle park. The men used normal and specialised recovery vehicles for the task, such as the BARV.

The precise mix and number of units depended of the perceived need of each location.

=== Training ===
From spring 1942, on the formation of the beach commandos, training was begun at the shore establishment HMS Armadillo Ardentinny, with amphibious training on Loch Long. RAF units and other formations destined for the beach groups were trained at Gailes Camp near Irvine, North Ayrshire.

Units formed in the Mediterranean trained at Kibrit on the Great Bitter Lake on the Suez Canal.

== Beach Groups ==
=== No. 3 Beach Group ===
Formed in the UK, it sailed to Sicily with the 1st Canadian Infantry Division, landing on 10 July 1943. It contained the 68th RAF Beach Unit. Utilised again for the Salerno landings, and attached to the British 56th Infantry Division, landing on Rodger beach on 9 September 1943, for this operation it contained the 68th and 69th RAF Beach Units.

=== No.4 Beach Group ===
This unit also sailed with the 1st Canadian Infantry Division from Britain and landed with them during the invasion of Sicily. It contained the 69th RAF Beach Unit. It was the reserve Beach group for Juno.

=== No.5 Beach Group ===
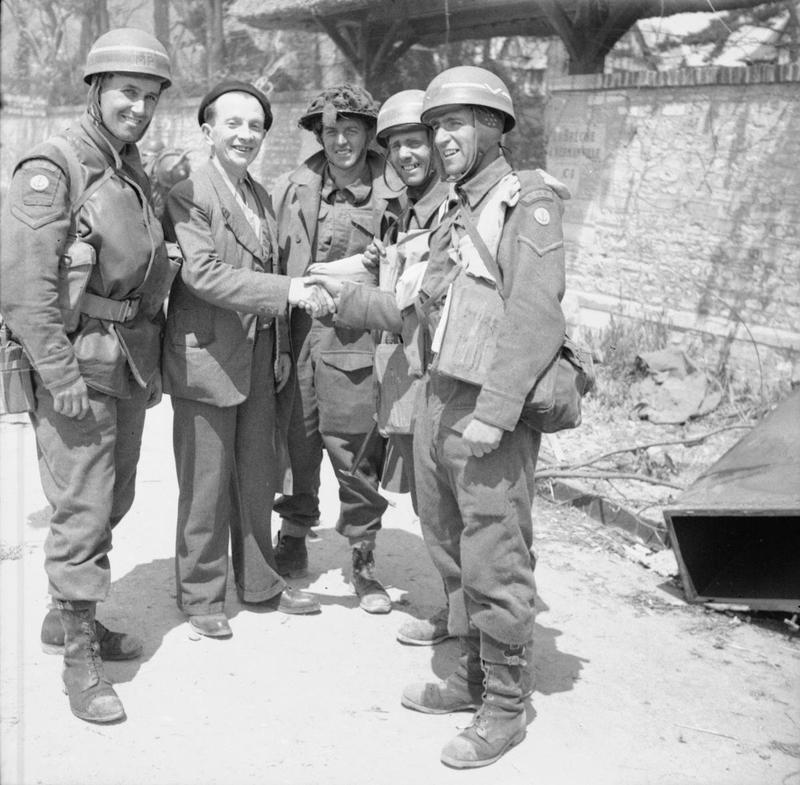
Military Police dispatch riders of No.5 or 6 Beach group greet French Civilians

Supported the 3rd Infantry Division on Sword, Queen beaches.

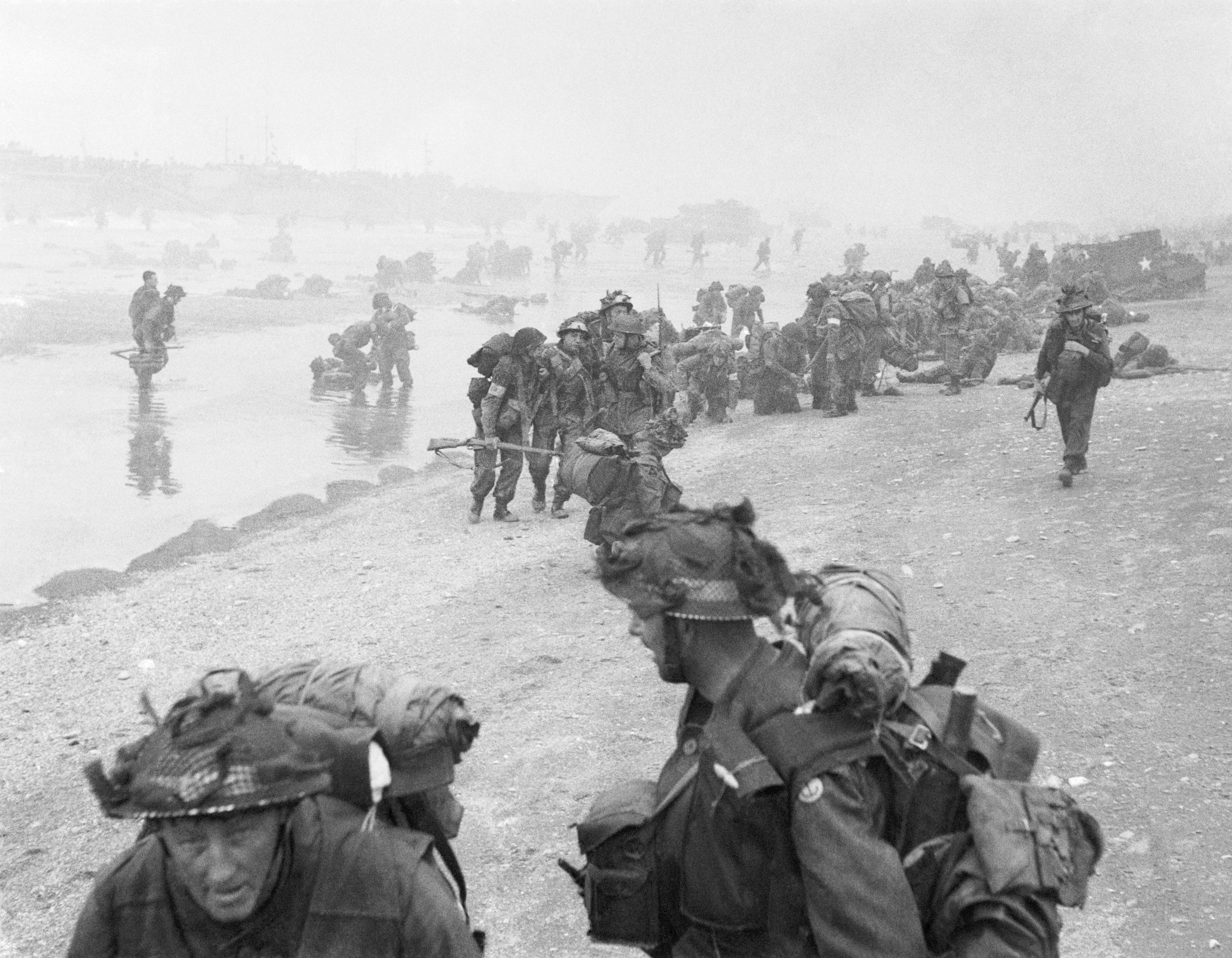
Men of 84 Field Coy RE (foreground) on Sword

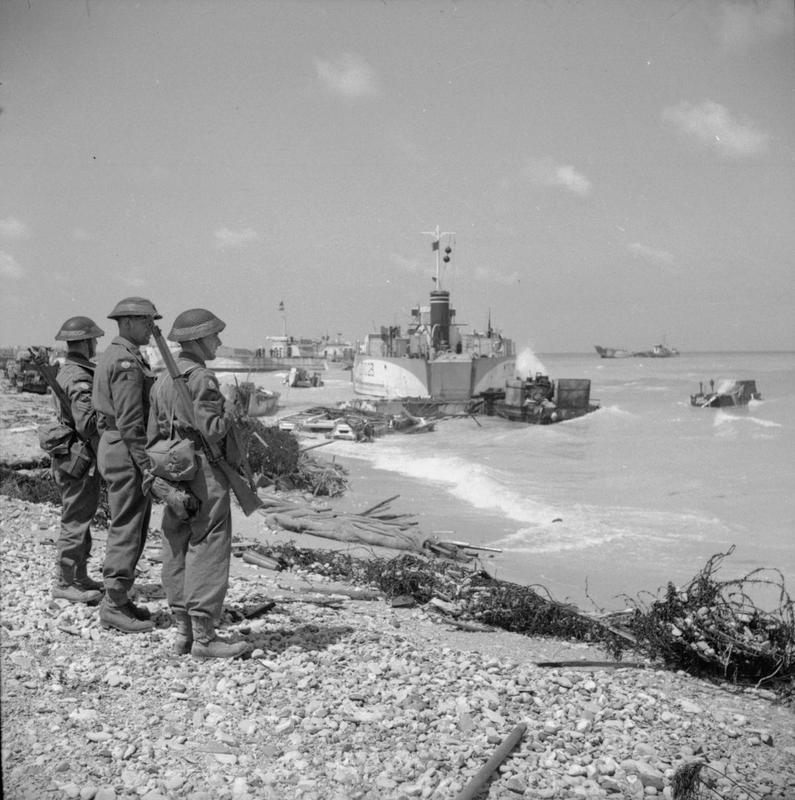
Beach Group troops look out from Queen beach, Sword, littered with beached landing craft and wrecked vehicles and equipment, 7 June 1944

Composition
Service	Arm of Service (Army only)	Unit
Royal Navy		Beach Commando Unit F
Royal Navy		13th Beach Signals
Army	Infantry	5th Battalion The King's Regiment (Liverpool)
Army	R.A.M.C.	20th, 21st, 30th, 39th Field Dressing Stations
Army	R.A.M.C.	1st Field Sanitary Section
Army	R.A.M.C.	39th, 40th, 55th Field Surgery Units
Army	R.A.M.C.	21st, 29th Field Transfusion Units
Army	R.A.M.C.	16th Gas Clearing Station
Army	R.A.O.C.	44th Ordnance Ammunition Company
Army	R.A.O.C.	11th Ordnance Beach Detachment
Army	Pioneer Corps	53rd, 102nd, 129th, 267th, 292nd, 303rd Pioneer Companies
Army	R.E.M.E.	20th Beach Recovery Section
Army	R.A.S.C.	96th Detail Issue Depot
Army	R.A.S.C.	H.Q. 21st Transport Column R.A.S.C.
Army	R.A.S.C.	39th, 101st, 635th General Transport Companies
Army	R.A.S.C.	257th Petrol Depot
Army	Royal Engineers	84th Field Company
Army	Royal Engineers	18th G.H.Q. Troop Engineers
Army	Royal Engineers	940th Inland Waterway Transport
Army	Royal Engineers	8th Stores Section
Army	Royal Engineers	20th Port Detachment
Army	Military Police	241st Provost Company
Royal Air Force		101st RAF Beach Flight

=== No.6 Beach Group ===
No.6 Beach Group was the reserve for Sword.

Composition
Service	Arm of Service (Army only)	Unit
Royal Navy		Beach Commando Unit R
Royal Navy		18th Beach Signals
Army	Infantry	1st (Buckinghamshire) Battalion Ox & Bucks Light Infantry
Army	R.A.M.C.	9th, 12th Field Dressing Stations
Army	R.A.M.C.	2nd Detachment Field Sanitary Section
Army	R.A.M.C.	37th, 38th Field Surgery Units
Army	R.A.O.C.	12th Ordnance Beach Detachment
Army	Pioneer Corps	85th, 149th Pioneer Companies
Army	R.E.M.E.	21st Beach Recovery Section
Army	R.A.S.C.	138th Detail Issue Depot
Army	R.A.S.C.	299th General Transport Company
Army	R.A.S.C.	238th Petrol Depot.
Army	Royal Engineers	91st Field Company
Army	Royal Engineers	50th Detachment Mechanical Equipment Platoon
Army	Royal Engineers	1028th Port Operating Company
Army	Military Police	245th HQ Provost Company
Royal Air Force		102nd RAF Beach Flight

=== No.7 Beach Group ===
Supported the 3rd Canadian Infantry Division landed on Mike in the Juno landing area.

Composition

Service	Arm of Service (Army only)	Unit
Royal Navy		Beach Commando Units L, P & S
Army	Infantry	8th (Irish) Battalion The King's Regiment
Army	R.A.M.C.	1st, 2nd Field Dressing Stations
Army	R.A.M.C.	3rd Field Sanitary Section
Army	R.A.M.C.	39th, 40th, 55th Field Surgery Units
Army	R.A.M.C.	13th, 14th Field Transfusion Units
Army	R.A.O.C.	45th Ordnance Ammunition Company
Army	R.A.O.C.	7th, 14th Ordnance Beach Depots
Army	Pioneer Corps	190th, 225th, 243rd, 293rd Pioneer Companies
Army	R.E.M.E.	20th Beach Recovery Section
Army	R.A.S.C.	139th Detail Issue Depot
Army	R.A.S.C.	282nd General Transport Company
Army	R.A.S.C.	240th Petrol Detachment
Army	Royal Engineers	72nd, 85th Field Companies
Army	Royal Engineers	11th Port Operating Group
Army	Royal Engineers	19th Stores Section
Army	Military Police	242nd Provost Company
Royal Air Force		103 RAF Beach Flight

=== No.8 Beach Group ===
Landed on Nan, in the Juno landing area.

Composition

Service	Arm of Service (Army only)	Unit
Royal Navy		Beach Commando Unit P
Royal Navy		19th Beach Signals Section
Army	Infantry	5th (Hackney) Battalion Royal Berkshire Regiment
Army	R.A.M.C.	32nd, 34th Field Dressing Stations
Army	R.A.M.C.	32nd Casualty Clearing Station
Army	R.A.O.C.	45th Ordnance Ammunition Company
Army	Pioneer Corps	115th, 144th, 170th Pioneer Companies
Army	R.E.M.E.	23rd Beach Recovery Section
Army	R.A.S.C.	140th Detail Issue Depot
Army	R.A.S.C.	30th Transport Company HQ
Army	R.A.S.C.	199th General Transport Company
Army	R.A.S.C.	242nd Petrol Company
Army	Royal Engineers	20th Field Company
Army	Royal Engineers	1034th Port Operating Company
Army	Royal Engineers	20th Stores Section
Army	Royal Engineers	59th Mechanised Equipment Section
Army	Royal Engineers	966th Inland Water Transport
Army	Military Police	242nd Provost Company
Royal Air Force		104 RAF Beach Flight

=== No.9 Beach Group ===
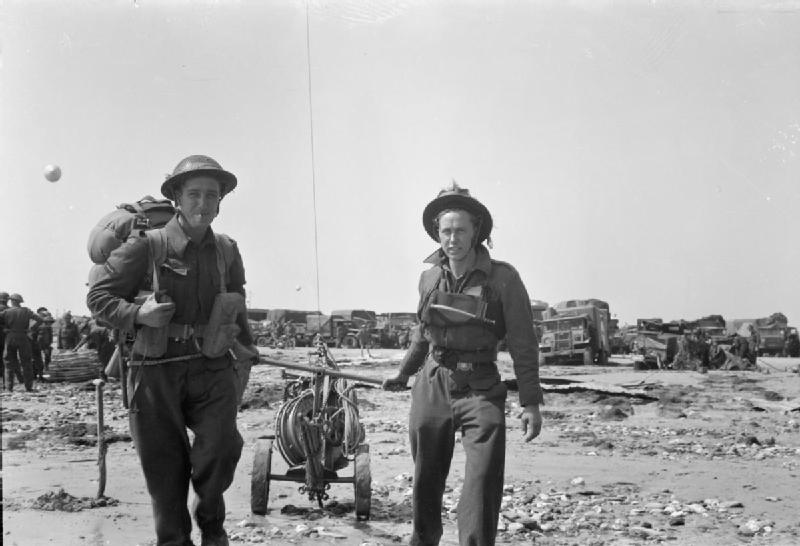
Men of 98th Balloon Squadron R.A.F. pull a balloon winch over King Beach

Supported the 50th (Northumbrian) Infantry Division landing on the King sector of the Gold, landing area.

Composition

Service	Arm of Service (Army only)	Unit
Royal Navy		Beach Commando Units J, G & T
Royal Navy		B10 Beach Signal Section
Army	Infantry	2nd Battalion Hertfordshire Regiment
Army	Royal Artillery	Heavy Anti-Aircraft Detachments
Army	Royal Artillery	Light Anti-Aircraft Detachments
Army	R.A.M.C.	3rd, 32nd, 35th Field Dressing Stations
Army	R.A.M.C.	47th, 48th Field Sanitary Units
Army	R.A.M.C.	3rd, 10th Casualty Clearing Stations
Army	R.A.M.C.	24th, 30th Field Transfusion Units
Army	R.A.O.C.	7th, 36th Ordnance Beach Detachment
Army	Pioneer Corps	75th, 208th, 209th Pioneer Companies
Army	R.E.M.E.	24th Beach Recovery Section
Army	R.A.S.C.	2nd Detail Issue Depot
Army	R.A.S.C.	305th General Transport Companies
Army	R.A.S.C.	247th Petrol Depot
Army	Royal Engineers	69th, 89th, 183rd Field Company
Army	Royal Engineers	74th Mechanised Equipment Section
Army	Royal Engineers	961st Inland Waterway Transport
Army	Royal Engineers	1043rd Port operating Company
Army	Royal Engineers	22nd Port Detachment
Army	Military Police	243rd Provost Company
Royal Air Force		107th RAF Beach Flight
Royal Air Force		98th Balloon Squadron

=== No.10 Beach Group ===
Landed on the Jig beaches, within the Gold sector.

Composition

Service	Arm of Service (Army only)	Unit
Royal Navy		Beach Commando Unit Q
Royal Navy		7th Beach Signal Section
Army	Infantry	6th Battalion Border Regiment
Army	Royal Artillery	Anti-Aircraft Detachments
Army	R.A.M.C.	25th, 31st Field Dressing Stations
Army	R.A.M.C.	30th, 41st, 42nd Field Sanitary Units
Army	R.A.M.C.	24th, 30th Field Transfusion Units
Army	R.A.O.C.	12th Ordnance Beach Depot
Army	Pioneer Corps	73rd, 112th, 120th, 173rd, 243rd Pioneer Companies
Army	R.E.M.E.	25th Beach Recovery Section
Army	R.A.S.C.	5th Detail Issue Depot
Army	R.A.S.C.	356th, 705th General Transport Companies
Army	R.A.S.C.	244th Petrol Depot
Army	Royal Engineers	90th Field Company
Army	Royal Engineers	51st Mechanised Equipment Section
Army	Royal Engineers	23rd, 1035th Port Operating Companies
Army	Royal Engineers	23rd Stores Section
Army	Military Police	240th Provost Company
Royal Air Force		108th RAF Beach Flight
Royal Air Force		55th Balloon Squadron

=== No. 20 Beach Group ===
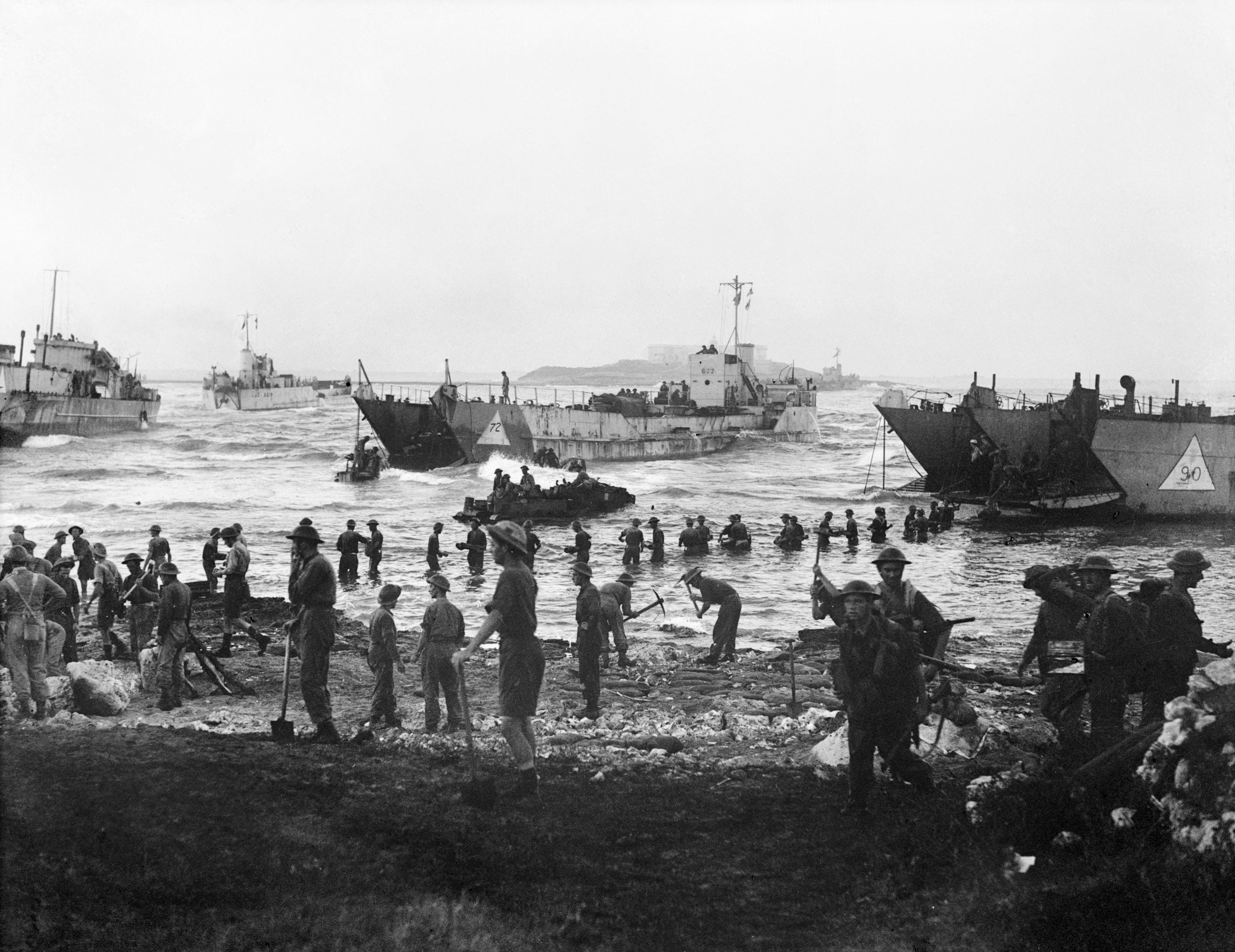
Highlanders assist with the unloading, while the beach group engineers prepare roads off the beach

This unit landed with the 51st (Highland) Infantry Division on Sicily on 10 July 1943. The infantry component was two companies of the 2/4th Hampshire Regiment.

=== No. 21 Beach Group ===
This unit also landed with the 51st (Highland) Infantry Division on Sicily on 10 July 1943. The unit was used again and landed at Salerno on Sugar beach, supporting the 56th Infantry Division. It contained two companies of the Hampshire Regiment and the RAF's 81st and 82nd Auxiliary Embarkation Units.

=== No.31 Beach Brick ===
Formed on 13 April 1943 at Kabrit in Egypt, around the 7th Battalion Royal Marines. This unit was charged with training itself and then other units that were to form other Beach Bricks. It landed on Sicily supporting the 231st Infantry Brigade at Marzamemi.

=== No.32 Beach Brick ===
Formed around the 2nd Battalion Highland Light Infantry, the Brick supported the 5th Infantry Division during the Sicily landings at Cassibile (beaches Nos. 45 and 46) south of Syracuse. The Brick again supported the 5th Division (13th Infantry Brigade) in the landings at Calabria on 3 September 1943 on George Beach.

=== No.33 Beach Brick ===
Formed on 1 April 1943 around 1st Battalion Argyll and Sutherland Highlanders, the Brick supported the 17th Infantry Brigade of the 5th Infantry Division at George Beach (beach No. 44). On 27 July, the Highlanders were sent to the front line and the 1st Battalion Welch Regiment took their place from No. 34 Beach Brick. The Brick was reassembled with the Highlanders for the landings at Calabria, again with 17th Brigade, on How beach north of Torrente. The Brick was disbanded in November 1943.

=== No.34 Beach Brick ===
Formed on 1 June 1943 at Kabrit Egypt around the 1st Battalion, Welch Regiment, the Brick supported the 50th (Northumbrian) Infantry Division during the Sicily Landings at Avola. For the landings at Calabria, the Brick supported the 3rd Canadian Infantry Brigade on Fox beach north of Reggio de Calabria. The Brick supported the Anzio landings with D Company of 18th Durham Light Infantry as the infantry component. Denis Healey was a Beach Master for this operation.

=== No.35 Beach Brick ===
Formed around the 18th Battalion Durham Light Infantry at Kabrit, it transferred to Algeria in July for training and then to Tunisia for more training with the 46th Infantry Division, whom it supported in the landings at Salerno on Uncle beach.

=== No.36 Beach Brick ===
Formed on 20 July 1943 at Kabrit in Egypt around the dismounted men of 8th Royal Tank Regiment. The brick was sent to Palestine in August, around plans for capture of Rhodes in late 1943. This was cancelled and the Brick transferred to the UK in early 1944. By this time, 8th Royal Tank Regiment had left the Brick and been re-equipped with tanks; 18th Durham Light Infantry took their place. For the Normandy landings, the Brick was in reserve for Gold.

Composition (Normandy)

Service	Arm of Service (Army only)	Unit
Army	Infantry	18th Battalion Durham Light Infantry
Army	Royal Artillery	HQ 100th Heavy Anti Aircraft Regiment
Army	Royal Artillery	305th Heavy Anti Aircraft Battery
Army	Royal Artillery	328th Light Anti Aircraft Battery
Army	R.A.M.C.	Detachments
Army	R.A.O.C.	Detachments
Army	R.E.M.E.	Detachments
Army	R.A.S.C.	Detail Issue Depot
Army	Royal Engineers	503rd Field Company
Army	Royal Engineers	Mechanised Equipment Company
Army	Military Police	Provost Detachment
Royal Air Force		15th RAF Beach Flight (?)

== Awards ==
Men of the Beach Groups and Bricks received the following awards during their service. This list is incomplete.

During the Salerno landings, the Distinguished Service Order was awarded to Wing Commander Rowland George O.B.E., and the Military Cross was awarded to Major Cameron (18th Durham Light Infantry) and Flight Lieutenant John Dobbin, who organised the beaches and cleared vehicle congestion while under fire.

During the Normandy Landings, the following Beach Commandos of Nos 5 and 6 Beach Groups received Awards.

Award	Commando
Distinguished Service Order (D.S.O.)	Lt Cdr Edward F. Gueritz RN
Distinguished Service Order (D.S.O.)	Sub Lt James H Speed RNVR
Distinguished Service Cross (DSC)	Sub Lt William Pittendrig RNVR
Distinguished Service Cross (DSC)	Sub Lt S.E. Willis RNVR
Distinguished Service Cross (DSC)	Sub Lt P.D. Anderton RNVR
Distinguished Service Medal (DSM)	AB Sidney Compston
Distinguished Service Medal (DSM)	AB William D Crook
Distinguished Service Medal (DSM)	LS Albert Charles Davy
Distinguished Service Medal (DSM)	AB Charles William Day
Distinguished Service Medal (DSM)	AB Donald Emery
Distinguished Service Medal (DSM)	LS Thomas William Gooding
Distinguished Service Medal (DSM)	AB Thomas Hunt
Distinguished Service Medal (DSM)	PO Frederick Raymond Smith
Distinguished Service Medal (DSM)	PO George Colin Richards
Distinguished Service Medal (DSM)	AB Edward George Saunders
Distinguished Service Medal (DSM)	PO George Graham Tapley
Croix de guerre	Sub Lt Richard H Dongar RNVR
Croix de guerre	AB Alan Watersworth

Members of the Royal Navy beach signals sections won the following.

Award	Recipient
DSC	Lt Robert Billington RNVR
DSM	Telegraphist Ronald Arthur Bateson
DSM	Coder Geoffrey Harris
DSM	Telegraphist Harry Monks
DSM	Telegraphist William George Quinn
DSM	Telegraphist Abraham Acton Parr
DSM	Telegraphist Kennet Eifon Penny
DSM	Acting Telegraphist Edwin William Sutton
Croix de Guerre	Coder Willian B Leggate

On 8 June, a German fighter plane dropped a bomb on the petrol and ammunition depot on Sword, with the ensuing fire threatening to destroy large quantities of supplies. Men of 5 and 6 Beach Groups worked to save the supplies; seven of whom were awarded the George Medal.

- Lt.Col. R D R Sale (1 Bucks)
- Maj. L Pepper (RAOC)
- Lt. E Fairbrother (RE)
- Sgt H Grant (Pioneers)
- Sgt J S MacGowen (RAOC)
- Sgt A G Wakeford (RASC)
- Pte A Catley (Pioneers)

== Australian Beach Groups ==
Two Australian beach groups were formed in June 1944, and saw action in the Borneo campaign in 1945.

=== 1st Beach Group ===
Supported the 9th Division in the landings at Brunei and Labuan. It was commanded by Colonel C. J. Cummings.

Composition

Service	Arm of Service (Army only)	Unit
Royal Australian Navy		Beach Commando A
Royal Australian Navy		Beach Commando C
Royal Australian Navy		2nd Beach Signals Section
Army	Pioneers	2/4th Pioneer Battalion
Army	Medical	1st A.A.M.C. Company
Army	Medical	20th Malaria Control Unit
Army	Ordnance	2nd Ordnance Beach Detachment
Army	A.E.M.E.	1st Beach Workshop
Army	A.A.S.C.	HQ 2/166th General Transport Company
Army	A.A.S.C.	2/47th Transport Platoon
Army	A.A.S.C.	2/48th Transport Platoon
Army	A.A.S.C.	2/166th Workshop Platoon
Army	A.A.S.C.	2/240th Supply Depot Platoon
Army	A.A.S.C.	57th B.I.P.O.D.
Army	Engineers	2/15th Field Company
Army	Engineers	1st Mechanical Equipment Platoon
Army	Engineers	1st Engineer Stores Platoon
Army	Provost	15th Independent Brigade Group Provost Platoon
Army	Salvage	3rd Armoured Division Salvage Unit

=== 2nd Beach Group ===
Supported the 9th Division in the Battle of Tarakan and the 7th Division in the Battle of Balikpapan. It was commanded by Colonel C. R. Hodgson.

Composition

Service	Arm of Service (Army only)	Unit
Royal Australian Navy		Beach Commando B
Royal Australian Navy		Beach Commando D
Royal Australian Navy		1st Beach Signals Section
Army	Pioneers	2/2nd Pioneer Battalion
Army	Medical	2nd A.A.M.C. Company
Army	Medical	23rd Malaria Control Unit
Army	Ordnance	1st Ordnance Beach Detachment
Army	A.E.M.E.	2nd Beach Workshop
Army	A.A.S.C.	HQ 2/108th General Transport Company
Army	A.A.S.C.	2/45th Transport Platoon
Army	A.A.S.C.	2/46th Transport Platoon
Army	A.A.S.C.	2/108th Workshop Platoon
Army	A.A.S.C.	2/235th Supply Depot Platoon
Army	A.A.S.C.	58th B.I.P.O.D.
Army	Engineers	2/11th Field Company
Army	Engineers	2nd Mechanical Equipment Platoon
Army	Engineers	2nd Engineer Stores Platoon
Army	Provost	17th Independent Brigade Group Provost Platoon
Army	Salvage	1st Armoured Division Salvage Unit

== See also ==
- Colin Maud

== Bibliography ==
- Forty, George (1998). Companion to the British Army 1939–1945 (3rd ed.). Stroud: The History Press. ISBN 978-0-7524-5240-1.
- Rogers, Joseph & David (2012). D-Day Beach Force: The Men who Turned Chaos into Order (1st ed.). Stroud: The History Press. ISBN 978-0-7524-6330-8.
