= 6th Beach Group =

No. 6 Beach Group
- Active: 1943–1944
- Country: United Kingdom
- Branch: British Army
- Role: Beach group
- Size: 3,298

Commanders
- 1st commander: Lt. Col. R. D. R Sale; March 1943 – 8 June 1944 (WIA)
- 2nd commander: Acting Lt. Col. E. A. Carse; 8 June – 10 July 1944

The No. 6 Beach Group was a unit of the British Army during the Second World War. It was responsible for organising the units landing on Sword in the Normandy landings on D-Day, 6 June 1944. The Beach Group was tasked with establishing dumps of equipment and supplies including ammunition, petrol and vehicles. The Group controlled all policing and unloading in the eastern flank of the Normandy invasion area.

== History ==
The 1st Buckinghamshire Battalion (1st Bucks) was a Territorial Army battalion of the Oxfordshire and Buckinghamshire Light Infantry and provided the infantry support for the group which was commanded by Lieutenant Colonel R. D. R. Sale. The 1st Bucks were deployed to defend the beachhead area from German counter-attacks after troops from the 3rd British Infantry Division had started to move inland to link up with the 6th Airborne Division.

No. 6 Beach Group also included units of the Royal Engineers, Royal Army Service Corps, Royal Army Ordnance Corps, Royal Electrical and Mechanical Engineers, Royal Army Medical Corps, Military Police and the Pioneer Corps. The HQ of the beach group moved to Lion-sur-Mer on 12 June 1944.

An advance party of No. 6 Beach Group, which included an anti-tank platoon of the 1st Bucks, landed on the first tide of the invasion on D-Day, 6 June 1944. The remainder of No. 6 Beach Group landed on the second tide of the invasion on D-Day. The commander of No. 5 Beach Group, Lieutenant-Colonel D. H. V. Board, was killed soon after landing by a German sniper, and Lieutenant Colonel Sale assumed command of both beach groups, totalling approximately 7,000 men. On 8 June Lt-Col. Sale was wounded by shrapnel, and his second-in-command Major E. A. Carse was appointed in his place with the acting rank of lieutenant colonel.

On 10 July 1944, No. 6 Beach Group was officially disbanded. As from 12 July 1944, all remaining landing craft were directed to Juno Beach and Gold Beach. 1st Bucks was transferred to other battalions fighting in the battle for Normandy including to the 2nd Battalion, Oxfordshire and Buckinghamshire Light Infantry (the 52nd) in the 6th Airborne Division and to the Black Watch (Royal Highland Regiment) and other units in the 51st (Highland) Infantry Division.

== Order of battle ==
On D-Day, 6 June 1944, No. 6 Beach Group comprised the following units:

- The 1st Buckinghamshire Battalion, Oxfordshire and Buckinghamshire Light Infantry
- 245th HQ Provost Company, Corps of Military Police
- Military Landing Officer's Party
- No. 85 Company, Pioneer Corps
- No. 149 Company, Pioneer Corps
- No. 102 RAF Beach Flight
- No. 18 Beach Signal Section, Royal Navy
- Detachment, 2nd Field Hygiene Section, Royal Army Medical Corps
- 9th Field Dressing Station, Royal Army Medical Corps
- 12th Field Dressing Station, Royal Army Medical Corps
- 37th Field Surgical Unit, Royal Army Medical Corps
- 38th Field Surgical Unit, Royal Army Medical Corps
- No. 12 Ordnance Beach Detachment, Royal Army Ordnance Corps
- 138th Detail Issue Depot, Royal Army Service Corps
- 238th Petrol Depot, Royal Army Service Corps
- No. 21 Beach Recovery Section, Royal Electrical and Mechanical Engineers
- 91st Field Company, Royal Engineers
- Detachment, No. 50 Mechanical Equipment Platoon, Royal Engineers
- 1028th Port Operating Company, Royal Engineers
- "R" Commando, Royal Naval Commandos

The following units joined No. 6 Beach Group after D-Day:

- No. 22 Field Transfusion Unit, Royal Army Medical Corps
- No. 53 Beach Balloon Flight, No.976 Beach Balloon Squadron, Royal Air Force
- No. 9 Stores Section, Royal Engineers
