= Norman Scarfe =

English historian (1923–2014)

Norman Scarfe MBE, FSA, (1 May 1923, Felixstowe - 2 March 2014, Ipswich was an English historian of locality noted for his work as regards his native Suffolk.

His first publication was Assault Division: A History of the 3rd Division from the Invasion of Normandy to the Surrender of Germany (1947). This was an account of the 3rd British Infantry Division following its leading role in the D-Day landings in 1944. Scarfe served in the Suffolk Regiment, part of this division, and participated in the landing on Sword Beach.

== Works ==
- Scarfe, Norman (2006) [1947]. Assault Division: A History of the 3rd Division from the Invasion of Normandy to the Surrender of Germany. Stroud, Gloucestershire: Spellmount. ISBN 978-1-86227-338-2.
- Scarfe, Norman (1983). Cambridgeshire (A Shell Guide). Faber and Faber. ISBN 0-571-13250-2.
