= List of ships in Sword Bombardment Group =

Ships supporting the 1944 Normandy landings

Below is a list of ships responsible for bombarding targets at Sword as part of the Normandy landings on 6 June 1944, the opening day of Operation Overlord, the Allied operation that launched the successful invasion of German-occupied western Europe during World War II.

Sword Bombardment Group
| Name | Type | National service |
|---|---|---|
| Ramillies | Battleship | Royal Navy |
| Warspite | Battleship | Royal Navy |
| Frobisher | Heavy cruiser | Royal Navy |
| Arethusa | Light cruiser | Royal Navy |
| Danae | Light cruiser | Royal Navy |
| Dragon | Light cruiser | Polish Navy |
| Mauritius | Light cruiser | Royal Navy |
| Eglinton | Destroyer | Royal Navy |
| Kelvin | Destroyer | Royal Navy |
| Middleton | Destroyer | Royal Navy |
| Saumarez | Destroyer | Royal Navy |
| Scorpion | Destroyer | Royal Navy |
| Scourge | Destroyer | Royal Navy |
| Serapis | Destroyer | Royal Navy |
| Ślązak | Destroyer | Polish Navy |
| Stord | Destroyer | Royal Norwegian Navy |
| Svenner | Destroyer | Royal Norwegian Navy |
| Swift | Destroyer | Royal Navy |
| Verulam | Destroyer | Royal Navy |
| Virago | Destroyer | Royal Navy |
| Roberts | Monitor | Royal Navy |
