= 5th Medium Regiment, Royal Canadian Artillery =

- Active: 22 September 1941 – 30 June 1945
- Country: Canada
- Type: Medium regiment
- Role: Artillery
- Size: Regiment
- Part of: First Canadian Army
- Engagements: World War II: Allied Invasion of Sicily; Moro River campaign; Battle of Monte Cassino; Gothic Line Offensive; Battle of Rimini; Operation Chuckle

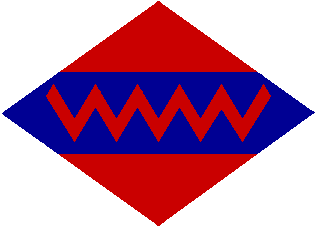
The formation patch worn by members of the Regiment. This indicated that they were troops attached directly to First Canadian Army.

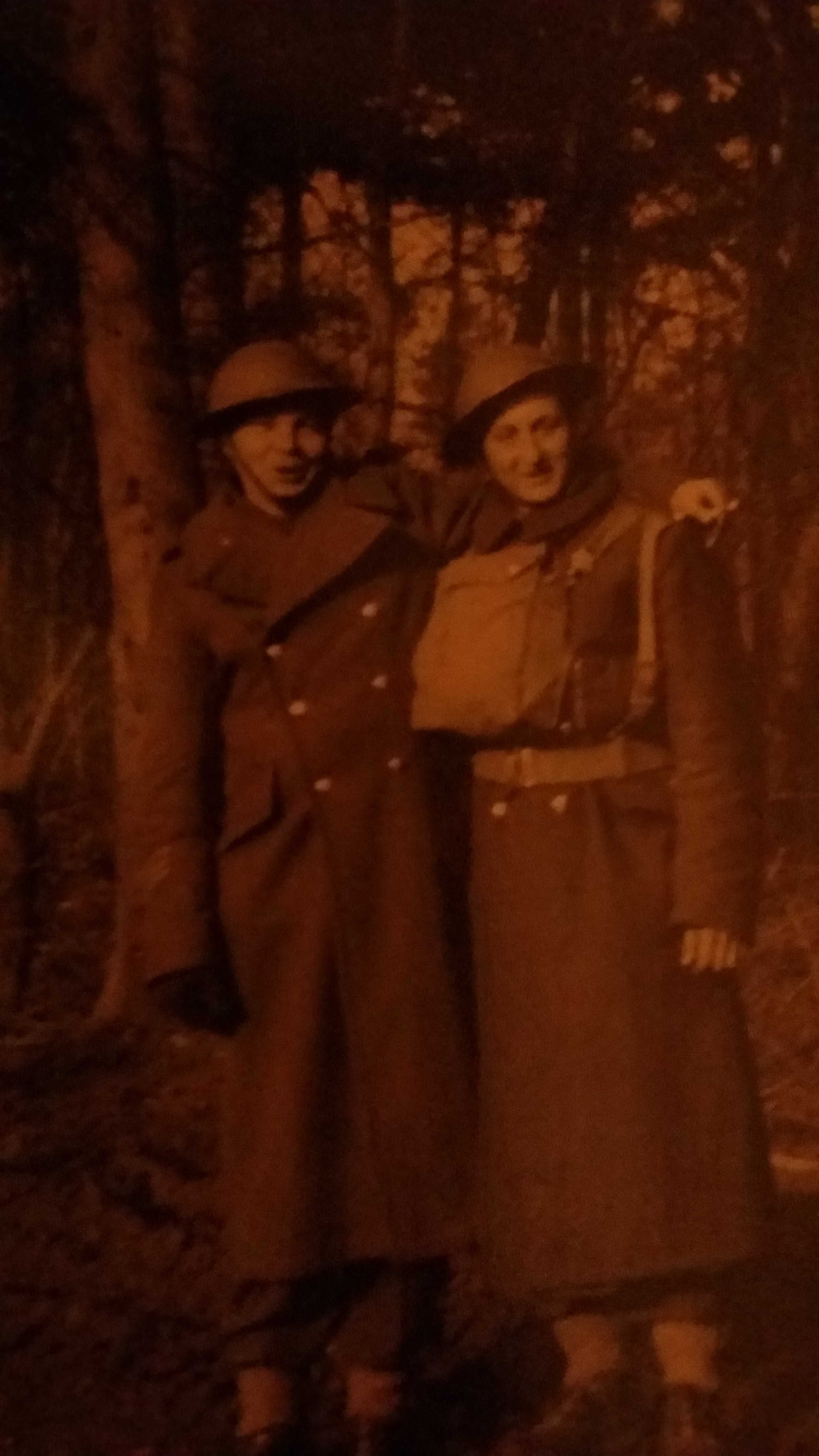
Soldiers of the 5th Medium Regiment of the Royal Canadian Artillery during the Second World War.

The 5th Medium Regiment, Royal Canadian Artillery, was one of six Canadian medium regiments that saw service in Britain and continental Europe in the Second World War, the others being the 1st, 2nd, 3rd, 4th, and 7th Medium Regiments. (There was no 6th Medium.)

== Formation ==
The 5th Medium Regiment was formed in England from two non-permanent batteries, namely the 7th Medium Battery (Montreal, Quebec) and the 23rd Medium Battery (Toronto, Ontario), on 22 September 1941. The regiment at this time was temporarily placed under the command of Major A. Bruce Matthews, who subsequently was promoted to Lt. Colonel. Prior to the creation of the 5th Medium Regiment, the 7th Medium Battery had been paired with the 2nd Medium Battery (Charlottetown, PEI) of the 1st Medium Regiment RCA. Similarly, the 23rd Medium Battery also belonged to the 1st Medium Regiment RCA and had been paired with the 3rd Medium Battery (Kingston, Ontario). It was not uncommon for members of each Battery to identify themselves by geographic location instead of by Battery number (e.g., as an Islander if 2nd Battery, or from Kingston, if 3rd Battery). Throughout the war there was always a friendly rivalry between these Medium batteries.

After the completion of the regiment's formation in England, in a manner of questionable legality, the 5th Medium became the first fully armed medium regiment in the UK. Paraphrased from the 5th Medium unpublished diary: in an "alcoholic orgy of bargaining," two Battery captains, Reiner and Hogarth, 'bought' eight new 5.5 inch guns from an officer in charge of the supply gun park for the bargain price of 300 cigarettes. All the guns arrived by the end of September 1941 making the 5th Medium the first regiment to be fully outfitted with armaments. Similarly, Lt. General AGL McNaughton was interested in conducting user trials of this new weapon. The 5th Medium conducted the user trials of the new artillery piece in January 1942 at Larkhill, England.

== Deployment ==
By October 1942, Lt. Colonel Matthews left the unit and was replaced by Lt Colonel Suttie. In this time before Christmas, the 5th Medium conducted a live fire demonstration for Lt. General AGL McNaughton and continued further training at Sennybridge. After two lively Christmas parties, the 5th Medium settled down for more training in the New Year.

At 0830 on 24 October 1943, Major Reiner informed the regiment of their anticipated movement towards a theater of action. The 23rd Battery, along with the Regimental HQ and the Signals section entrained at Leatherhead Station, while the rest of the 7th Battery at Woking station bound for Glasgow. According to the official orders outlining the operation (Code named "Timberwolf"), it was stated that all "units will be on 12.00 notice to entrain, from 0001 21 October 1943." On the afternoon of 26 October 1943 the 5th Medium boarded the Dutch liner, Sloterdijk (or Sloterdyk) in Glasgow along with elements of the 5th Canadian Armoured Division, HQ 1st AGRA, 2nd Medium RCA, and 11th Field Regiment RCA. On the evening of the 27th, the ship set sail in its convey in a northerly direction.

The troop ship continued into the North Atlantic causing a great deal of sea sickness. By estimates, it was documented that the waves and swells were 15-20+ feet in height. To keep the men occupied, pamphlets were given out detailing hygiene in tropical countries and notes for troops heading to North Africa. The convey traveled unmolested by aircraft or U-boat attack through the Atlantic and reached the straits of Gibraltar early in the evening of 4 November 1943.

On 6 November 1943, at 18:07, while north of Philippevile, North Africa (now known as Skikda), the men had just completed a treasure hunt for 100 playing cards hidden throughout the ship when the convey was attacked by German aircraft. The predetermined Bren gun defenses were effective at creating a wall of tracers around the ship. The convey shot down two bombers and the all clear was called at 20:00. The only casualty aboard the Sloterdijk was an American sailor who was shot (by accident) in the leg by Grn Greenshields. Later, it was found that No. 14 Hospital Ship had been damaged and disabled in the attack, and two other ships were lost, none carrying Canadians. The No. 14 Hospital Ship was towed towards Philippevile but sunk en route without loss of life on board.

By 8 November 1943, the Sloterdijk docked outside of Palermo Harbour, Sicily at 02:10. An advanced party left the ship at about 08:30 and the rest of the 5th Medium disembarked at 11:00 and marched 3 miles (4.8 km) outside the city to the staging point in a swampy field. As American trucks began to bring up supplies, the 5th Medium moved to a rock quarry as it was drier than the swamp. A rock slide, caused by heavy rains, killed Grn. Chiasson when he was struck by a falling boulder. Two others required hospitalization, one of which required the amputation of a leg. The 5th Medium spent the rest of the night without cover, tents or food in torrential downpours of rain.

After boarding box cars, the 5th Medium left Lolli Station, Palermo, on 10 November 1943 towards their more permanent area in Zafferana. Traveling by train, the entire 5th Medium reached the Villa Angela on the slope of Mount Etna by 11 November 1943. The next few days in Zafferana consisted of continued training and inspections (and numerous swims in the Mediterranean Sea). On the 16–17 November 1943, the 7th and 23rd Batteries moved to Ionia. The training and checking of equipment continued, with events like mail arriving from Canada and even a minor earthquake occurring. The discipline was very strict, although it was noted that members of the 5th Medium were able to send a few parties into the city of Catania to gather wine. Also the amount of dysentery from men trading cigarettes for contaminated figs, oranges, dates and nuts were numerous because of the unsanitary handling of the food by the peasants.

As the winter approached the 5th Medium moved to Altamura on 11 January 1944. On 24 February, eight new 4.5 inch guns arrived. Now complete with armament and equipment, the 5th Medium moved forward along the Adriatic coast to the river Sangro towards the Ortona line. The night of the 24 February 1944, the 5th Medium remained behind the line in outside of Lanciano awaiting the movement into the front.

The 5th Medium found action in the Adriatic front held by the 5 British Corps. At this point, the 5th Medium had little to do but the odd counter-battery and in support of the 8th Indian Division's attempt at capturing German soldiers in the houses across the Moro.

By mid-April, the 5th Medium received its orders to move again for a spring offensive on Cassino in the Liri Valley. On 27 April 1944, the 5th Medium began moving under the cover of darkness, stopping during the day in order to conceal their movements. By 11 May 1944, everything was in order for the assault on the German held Gustav line.

At 23:00 on 11 May 1944 (Operation Honker), almost 2,000 Allied artillery pieces began firing on Cassino and the Gustav line. The 5th Medium's task during the attack was predetermined fire plans, shoots on hostile batteries, nebelwerfers and other targets of opportunity. By 3 June 1944, the regiment came out of action and began its move towards Pofi.

By 11 June 1944, the regiment had returned to its old concentration area in Guardia. Training continued and by 3 August 1944, the regiment began to move again to an area near Spolatto. On 15 August 1944, Brigadier Huckvale, Commander of 1st Army Group Royal Artillery informed the regiment that it was going back into action north of Jesi, close to the Gothic Line.

The 5th Medium found the Germans dug in along the Metauro and moved into a forward position on 24 August 1944. On 25 August 1944 at 24:00, the regiment participated in a large artillery barrage, but nowhere near the size conducted at Cassino. The fighting in this area continued for another week and the 5th Medium went out of action again on 2 September 1944 and took up a position outside of San Giovanni. They remained in this position for 13 days, in part due to the stiff resistance the 5 British Corps were facing from the Germans. Movement again occurred on 16 September 1944 to Coraino. On the night of 21 September 1944, the rain reduced the hillside the regiment was located into a "mass of mud". The Germans also were laying accurate fire on the roads leading from the area, thus restricting the regiment's movement. Equally, all equipment was "stuck at all possible angles and places" in the mud necessitating a postponement of movement until the next day. Eventually, after much winching and digging, the equipment was freed from the mud and the regiment made its way to a position south of Rimini.

The regiment spent four days at the position in Rimini suffering many counter-battery attacks from German artillery. They then moved through the ruins of Rimini on the north side. The regiment remained in this position until 12 October 1944 when the advance on the front was again slowed at Savio. The regiment remained in action, doing little firing until 11 November 1944 when it moved into a rest area at Cesenatico. After spending two weeks at Cesenatico, Operation "Chuckle" began with intentions to capture Bologna and contain the 28 German Divisions in Italy. Bagnacavallo and Ravenna were eventually taken and the 5th Medium halted its advance along the Senio River which was decided would be the winter front line. The 5th Medium was eventually shifted to a new location near Godo. By 19 February 1945, the regiment came out of action and moved back to Cesenatico for movement to a new theater of action.

On 23 February 1945 the 5th Medium learned that it was leaving Italy for North-West Europe. The regiment spent a week and a half in a camp outside of Naples (Camp Lammie) before boarding the ship, Ville D'Oran, on 12 March 1945 in Naples harbour.

On 13 March 1945, at 10:30, the 5th Medium disembarked in Marseille and was transported to a camp outside the city. The next day, in convoy, the 5th Medium moved through the Rhone Valley of France, into Belgium. On 19 March 1945, the regiment settled in the town of Waregam. After numerous cancelled movement orders, the 5th Medium eventually received orders to move into the Netherlands, outside of Nijmegen, firing on 1 April 1945 at 23:00 on targets along the Rhine and Ijssel. By 15 April 1945, the 5th Medium moved to a new position north of Valberg, remaining there until 19 April 1945 when the regiment took up its last offensive position near Barneveld.

On 26 April 1945, the regiment received orders that it would not fire again, unless in retaliation. By 2 May 1945 a local truce had been declared to allow food conveys through to the Dutch citizens. On the evening of 4 May 1945, the regiment received word that the cessation of hostilities would occur on the following day and subsequently, a double issue of rum was authorized within the regiment to all personnel.

After Victory in Europe Day on 8 May 1945, the regiment moved towards Hippo and eventually to Doorn. The last day of the regiment's official existence was 30 June 1945. The final notation in the 5th Medium's war diary ends: "This is the last entry of the war diary of the 5th Cdn. Med. Regt., RCA. FINTO -- KAPUT"
