= II Canadian Corps =

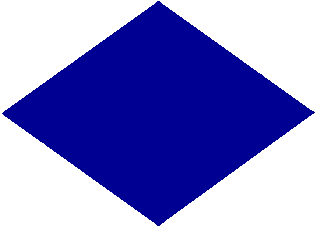
- Formation patch worn by corps-level personnel.
- Active: 1943–1945
- Country: Canada
- Branch: Canadian Army
- Type: Corps
- Size: Two Canadian infantry divisions, one Canadian armoured division, 1st Polish Armoured Division, units from other Allied countries.

Commanders
- Notable commanders: Guy Simonds

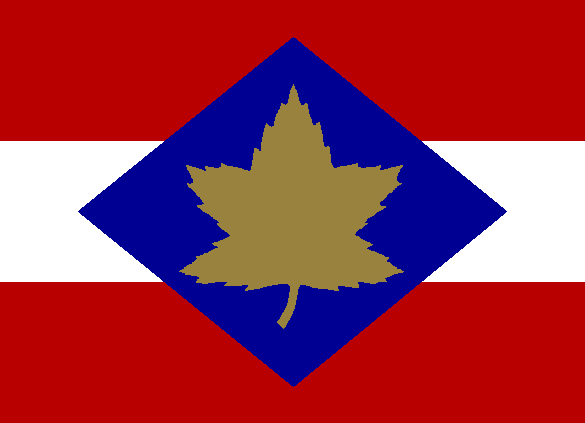
The formation sign used to identify vehicles associated with corps-level units.

II Canadian Corps was a corps-level formation that, along with I (British) Corps (August 1, 1944, to April 1, 1945) and I Canadian Corps (April 6, 1943, to November 1943, and April 1, 1945, until the end of hostilities), comprised the First Canadian Army in Northwest Europe during World War II.

Authorization for the formation of the corps headquarters became effective in England on January 14, 1943. Over March 4–12 the new Canadian corps was involved in Exercise Spartan, a large-scale training exercise in southern England. This exercise revealed weaknesses in the command of both the new Corps and of First Canadian Army, and this led directly to several changes in leadership over the subsequent year.

The first commander of II Canadian Corps was Lieutenant-General Ernest William Sansom, effective January 15, 1943. Concerns over his leadership abilities and health caused Sansom to be replaced by Lieutenant-General Guy Simonds on January 29, 1944. Simonds led the corps for the remainder of its existence. On May 5, 1945, at Bad Zwischenahn in Northern Germany, Simonds accepted the surrender of German forces facing II Canadian Corps at the end of the war. The corps was deactivated on June 25 as part of general demobilization.

II Canadian Corps opened its first tactical headquarters in Normandy at Amblie on June 29, 1944. The headquarters became fully operational on July 7 as the 2nd Canadian Infantry Division began to arrive in France. This first division was soon joined by the 3rd Canadian Infantry Division and the 2nd Canadian Armoured Brigade, which had participated earlier in the Normandy landings and in Operation Windsor as part of I (British) Corps. The 4th Canadian (Armoured) Division was the third Canadian division-level component of the corps. Finally, for most of the campaign through Northwest Europe the corps also included Polish 1st Armoured Division.

Although nominally a Canadian formation, II Canadian Corps contained significant contributions at different times from other Allied countries. In addition to the 1st Polish Armoured Division, the corps included the 1st Belgian Infantry Brigade, the Royal Netherlands Motorized Infantry Brigade, and the 51st (Highland) Infantry Division.

== Major Operations ==
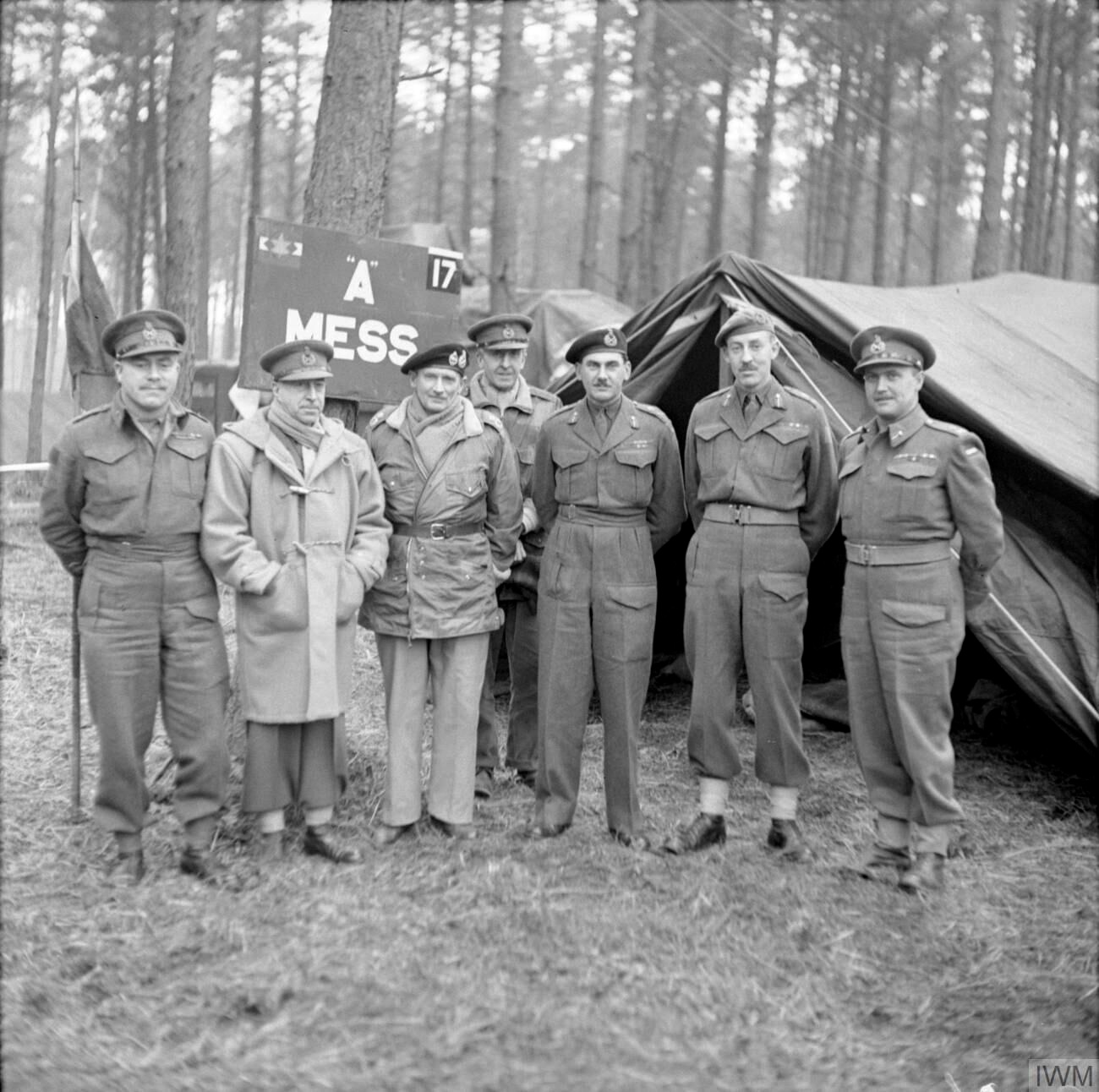
Field Marshal Sir Bernard Montgomery (third from left) shown along with senior commanders of the First Canadian Army while visiting the headquarters of II Canadian Corps, near Kleve, February 1945. From left to right: Major General C. Vokes (4th Canadian Armoured Division), General H. D. C. Crerar (First Canadian Army), Field Marshal Sir Bernard L Montgomery (21st Army Group, Lieutenant General B. G. Horrocks (XXX (British) Corps, attached to First Canadian Army), Lieutenant General G. G. Simonds (II Canadian Corps), Major General D. C. Spry (3rd Canadian Infantry Division), and Major General A. B. Matthews (2nd Canadian Infantry Division).

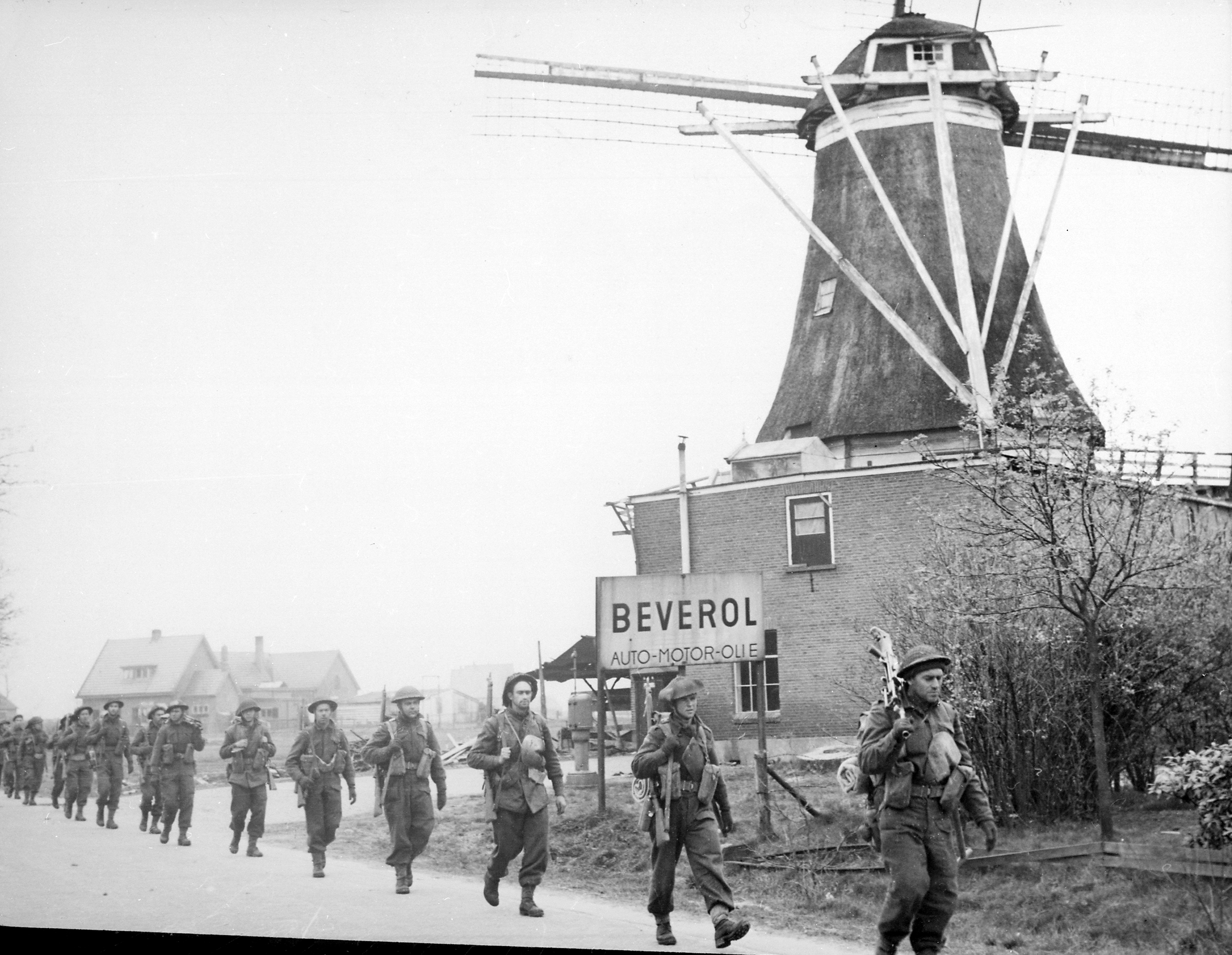
II Canadian Corps troops of the Régiment de Maisonneuve advancing along the road from Holten to Rijssen, the Netherlands, April 9, 1945.

II Canadian Corps engaged in combat operations in North-West Europe from the beginning of July 1944 to just before VE Day in early May 1945. During the Battle of Normandy, the corps was used to spearhead the British-Canadian advance from Caen to Falaise. With the final closure of the Falaise Gap on August 21, 1944, the remaining German forces in northern France were forced into a rapid retreat back towards defensive positions in port cities along the coast, and in the regions just south of the Netherlands and outside the western borders of Germany, in Belgium and eastern France. The First Canadian Army formed the left flank of the advancing Allied armies, and was charged with capturing or sealing off German-occupied ports in Northern France and in Belgium. Dieppe, Boulogne, Calais, Cap-Gris-Nez and Ostend were captured in September by troops of II Canadian Corps. However, the defences of Dunkirk proved to be so strong that it was decided to leave the German-occupied port city under siege until the end of the European war. Antwerp had been captured by the British Second Army on September 4, but the city's large port facilities were useless to the Allies as long as German forces continued to occupy the banks of the Scheldt Estuary. As the spearhead of the First Canadian Army, II Canadian Corps was heavily involved in the Battle of the Scheldt to clear out those German positions. II Canadian Corps was involved in the battles to expel German forces from the eastern provinces of the Netherlands, back across the western border of Germany, and then to drive them out from the west bank of the Rhine River. In the final phases of the war, II Canadian Corps advanced into the northern provinces of the Netherlands and across the border into Germany towards the North Sea coast. On May 5, 1945 Lt.-Gen. Simonds received the unconditional surrender of those German forces facing the corps in northern Germany.

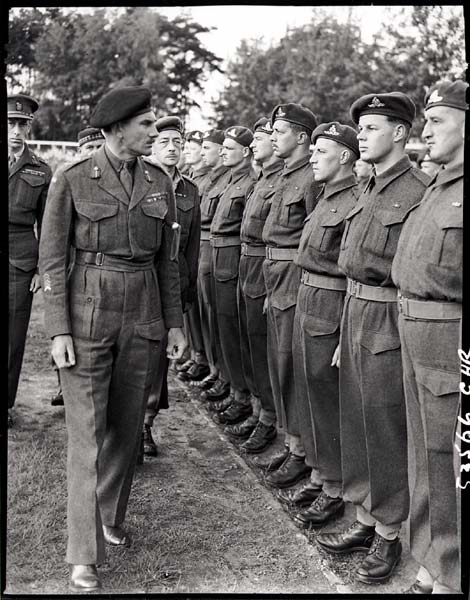
Lieutenant-General Guy Simonds inspecting II Canadian Corps troops in Meppen, Germany, May 31st, 1945.

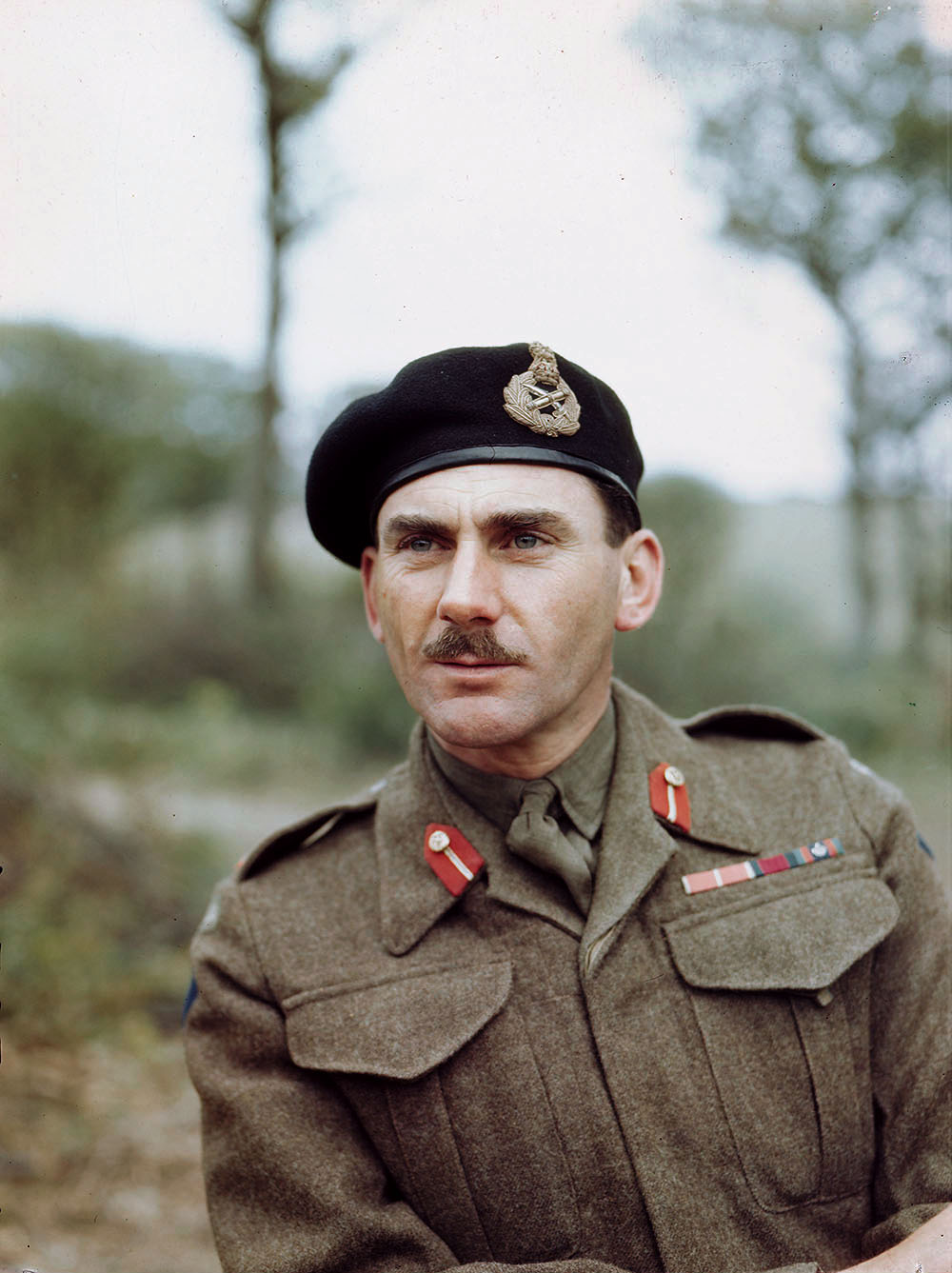
Lieutenant-General Guy Simonds

- Operation Atlantic, crossing the Orne River and unsuccessful attempt to capture Verrières Ridge, area south of Caen, July 18–21, 1944
- Operation Spring, assault against Verrières Ridge, July 25–28, 1944
- Operation Totalize, capture of Verrières Ridge and advance towards Falaise, Normandy, August 8–13, 1944
- Operation Tractable, capture of Falaise, Normandy, August 14–21, 1944
- Advance up to and then across the River Seine at Elbeuf and Rouen, Aug. 23–28, 1944
- Liberation of Dieppe, abandoned by the retreating German Army, Sept. 1, 1944
- Investment of Dunkirk as the initial part of the 8-month-long siege of that port city, Sept. 7-18, 1944
- Liberation of Ostend, Sept. 9, 1944
- Liberation of Bruges, Sept. 12, 1944
- Operation Wellhit, capture of Boulogne, September 17–22, 1944
- Operation Undergo, capture of Calais and the heavy batteries at Cap Gris Nez, September 25–30, 1944
- Operation Switchback, clearing area north of the Albert Canal, Belgium, October 6 to November 3, 1944
- Operation Vitality, South Beveland peninsula and Walcheren Island, the Netherlands, October 24 to November 3, 1944
- Operation Infatuate I, South Beveland, October 26, 1944
- Operation Veritable, Reichwald Forest, Germany, February 8 to March 11, 1945
- Operation Blockbuster, Hochwald gap and the capture of Xanten on the Rhine River, Germany, February 23 to March 3, 1945
- Battle of Friesoythe, April 13-14 1945
- Battle of Groningen, northern Netherlands, April 14–18, 1945
- Operation Duck, crossing of the Ems River and the capture of Leer, April 28 to May 4, 1945
- Capture of Oldenburg, April 25 to May 4, 1945

== Commanders ==
- Lieutenant-General Ernest William Sansom (January 15, 1943 to January 29, 1944)
- Lieutenant-General Guy Simonds (January 29, 1944 to June 25, 1945)

== Order of battle ==
- 2nd Canadian Infantry Division
- 3rd Canadian Infantry Division
- 4th Canadian (Armoured) Division
- 1st Polish Armoured Division, August 1944 to May 1945
- 15th (Scottish) Infantry Division, January to March, 1945
- 51st (Highland) Infantry Division, August 1944
- 2nd Canadian Armoured Brigade
- 33rd Armoured Brigade, August 1944, Operation Totalize
- 1st Belgian Infantry Brigade, April 1945
- Royal Netherlands Motorized Infantry Brigade, August 1944
- 1st Czechoslovak Armoured Brigade, October–November 1944, Siege of Dunkirk
- Corps troops
  - 2nd Corps Defence Company (The Prince Edward Island Light Horse)
  - 18th Armoured Car Regiment (12th Manitoba Dragoons)
  - 6th Light Anti-Aircraft Regiment, Royal Canadian Artillery (RCA)
  - 6th Anti-Tank Regiment, RCA
  - 2nd Survey Regiment, RCA
  - 8th Field Park Company, Royal Canadian Engineers (RCE)
  - 29th, 30th and 31st Field Companies, RCE
  - 2nd Drilling Company, RCE
  - II Canadian Corps Headquarters Signals, Royal Canadian Corps of Signals
  - No. 2 Corps Troops Company, Royal Canadian Army Service Corps (RCASC)
  - II Canadian Corps Transport Company, RCASC
  - No. 33 and 34 Transport Companies, RCASC
  - No. 2 Motor Ambulance Company, RCASC
  - No. 2 Headquarters Corps Car Company, RCASC
  - No. 2 and 3 Casualty Clearing Stations, Royal Canadian Army Medical Corps (RCAMC)
  - No. 6 Field Dressing Section, RCAMC
  - No. 8 Field Hygiene Section, RCAMC
  - unknown Dental Companies, Canadian Dental Corps (CDC)
  - No. 12 Base Dental Company, CDC
  - No. 2 Corps and Army Troops Sub-Park, Royal Canadian Ordnance Corps (RCOC)
  - II Corps Troops Workshop, Royal Canadian Electrical and Mechanical Engineers (RCEME)
  - Recovery Compani(es), RCEME
  - No. 13 Provost Company, Canadian Provost Corps (C Pro C)
- Attached First Canadian Army Troops
  - No. 2 Army Group Royal Canadian Artillery
    - 19th Army Field Regiment, RCA
    - 3rd Medium Regiment, RCA
    - 4th Medium Regiment, RCA
    - 7th Medium Regiment, RCA
  - "E" Squadron, 25th Armoured Delivery Regiment (The Elgin Regiment), Canadian Armoured Corps
