= Bruce Matthews (Canadian Army officer) =

Canadian general (1909–1991)

Major General Albert Bruce Matthews CBE DSO ED
- Born: 12 August 1909; Ottawa, Ontario
- Died: 12 September 1991 (aged 82)
- Relatives: Albert Edward Matthews (father)
- Military career
- Branch: Canadian Army
- Service years: 1928–1945
- Rank: Major General
- Unit: Royal Canadian Artillery
- Commands: 5th Medium Regiment, Royal Canadian Artillery; 2nd Canadian Infantry Division
- Conflicts: World War II
- Awards: Distinguished Service Order; Commander of the Order of the British Empire; Honorary citizenship of the city of Groningen
- Other work: Colonel commandant of the Royal Regiment of Canadian Artillery; President Liberal Party of Canada

Major General Albert Bruce Matthews CBE DSO ED (12 August 1909 – 12 September 1991) was a senior Canadian Army officer and businessman. Although not a professional soldier, he nevertheless rose to be the General Officer Commanding (GOC) of the 2nd Canadian Infantry Division during the final months of the Second World War, after having served with distinction in campaigns in Sicily, Italy and Western Europe from 1943-1945. He became noted for his personal bravery and the accuracy and reliability of the artillery under his command. Post-war, his business career continued. In addition, he was active in the Canadian Liberal Party.

== Early life ==
Born 1909, his father, Albert Edward Matthews, was a prominent stockbroker with Liberal connections who became Lieutenant-Governor of Ontario in 1937. Bruce Matthews was educated at Upper Canada College in Toronto, later serving as President of its Board of Governors, and at University of Geneva. He then joined the family firm.

Matthews married Victoria Thorne in 1937; the couple had one child before the outbreak of war and, after Victoria had visited Matthews in Britain in summer 1940, there were twins in 1941, although Matthews did not see them until October 1945.

== Military career ==
At first, in 1927, Matthews, was turned down for admission to the Royal Military College of Canada and he was also rejected by the Royal Canadian Navy Reserve due to his colour blindness. Nevertheless, in 1928, he joined the Non-Permanent Active Militia, 30th Field Battery, 3rd Field Brigade, Royal Canadian Artillery, as a provisional lieutenant, qualifying as a lieutenant later that year. He was promoted to captain in 1933 and started a two-year militia staff course. In 1936, Matthews was appointed adjutant in the 7th Toronto Regiment of the Royal Canadian Artillery, and in 1938, he commanded the 15th Field Battery, as a major.

The Second World War was declared in September 1939 and Matthews was posted overseas to the United Kingdom with the 1st Canadian Infantry Division, then commanded by Andrew McNaughton, a fellow RCA gunner, in December. In the wartime army, Matthews rose steadily; commanding a battery in March 1940, and, after becoming second-in-command of the 1st Medium Regiment, Royal Canadian Artillery, then he raised the 5th Medium Regiment (as a lieutenant-colonel) in September 1941. After an appointment from September 1942 as counter battery officer at Headquarters, I Canadian Corps, in January 1943 Matthews was promoted to brigadier at the age of 33, the youngest at that time in the Canadian Army, and Commander, Royal Artillery, (CRA) of the 1st Canadian Division, now commanded by Guy Simonds, another fellow gunner described as "brusque and demanding, a no-nonsense division commander".

Matthews' active service started in July 1943, landing in Sicily and directing the naval gunfire of HMS Roberts and later finding artillery locations, while under direct enemy fire, for the assault on Agira during the Sicily campaign. In September 1943, his Italian mainland campaign began: he was later awarded the DSO after he "demonstrated substantial courage prior to the capture of Agira, going forward under observed German fire to reconnoitre ground for his gun positions".

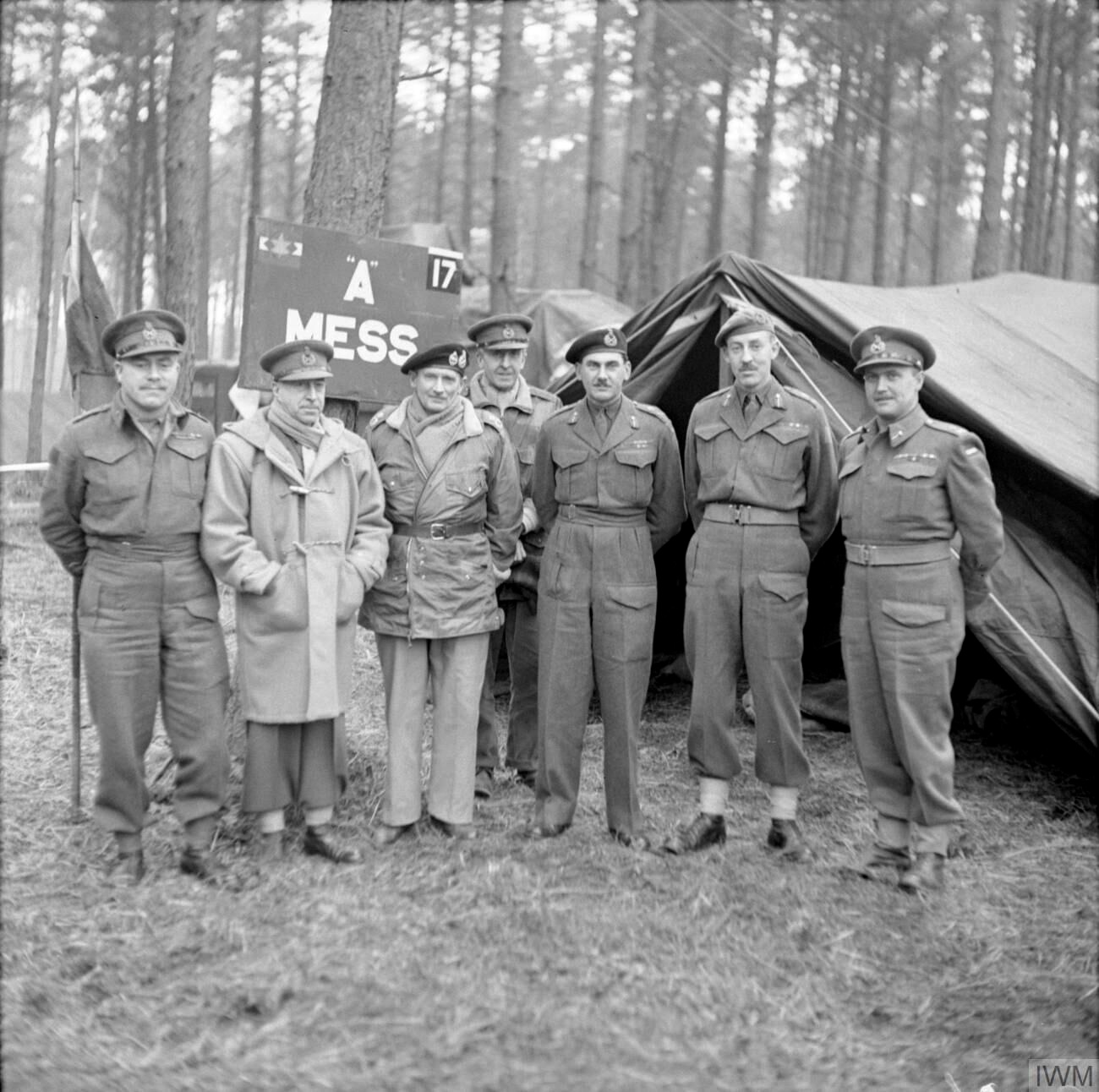
From left to right, Major-General Chris Vokes, General Harry Crerar, Field Marshal Sir Bernard Montgomery, Lieutenant-General Brian Horrocks, Lieutenant-General Guy Simonds, Major-General Daniel Spry, and Major-General Bruce Matthews, pictured here in early 1945 during Operation Veritable.

He returned to the United Kingdom in January 1944, having been transferred to the II Canadian Corps as CCRA, regarded as the "second most senior job for a gunner in the Canadian forces". II Corps was activated in Normandy on July 11, 1944, over a month after the Normandy landings, and participated in several actions (Operations Atlantic, Spring, Totalize and Tractable) in the Battle of Normandy. Matthews developed the artillery firing plans for each of these operations.

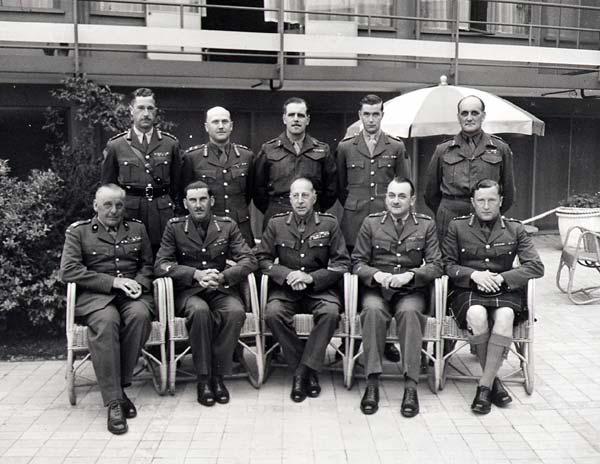
Senior commanders of the First Canadian Army, May 1945. Seated from the left: Stanisław Maczek (Polish Army), Guy Simonds, Harry Crerar, Charles Foulkes, Bert Hoffmeister. Standing from the left: Ralph Keefler, Bruce Matthews, Harry Foster, Robert Moncel (standing in for Chris Vokes), Stuart Rawlins (British Army).

Matthews' coordination of the large-scale artillery support in Normandy and Walcheren showed him to be a highly skilled gunner.

In November 1944, due to Simonds recommending him, Matthews was promoted to major general and appointed General Officer Commanding (GOC) of the 2nd Canadian Infantry Division, after Charles Foulkes had been sent to Italy to command I Canadian Corps. Matthews brought it back to high operational efficiency after its gruelling battles on the Scheldt. The division took part in the Rhineland battles (Operations Veritable and Blockbuster) battles in February and March 1945. The division advanced from Kalkar, through the Hochwald and Xanten to Wesel, narrowly failing to prevent the demolition of the Rhine bridges by the retreating Germans.

Once across the Rhine, Matthews' division liberated the northern Netherlands and then made a rapid 150-mile move to guard XXX Corps' right flank on the Weser. The Canadians captured Oldenburg and they were approaching Wilhelmshaven when hostilities ceased on May 5.

== Post war ==
Forgoing a promising military career, Matthews returned to Canadian business life and he was appointed to directorships with Excelsior Life, Dome Mines, Standard Broadcasting and the Canadian Corps of Commissionaires. He was chairman of Massey Ferguson from April 19, 1978, to December 12, 1978, and president of the Argus Corporation. In politics, he served as President of the Liberal Party of Canada in the late 1950s and early 1960s.

He served as Colonel commandant of the Royal Regiment of Canadian Artillery from 1964 to 1969.

Matthews was considered for the post of Governor General but his strong party allegiance precluded him.

Matthews died in September 1991, shortly after turning 82.

== Bibliography ==
- Granatstein, Jack (2005) [1993]. The Generals: The Canadian Army's Senior Commanders in the Second World War. Stoddart Publishing. ISBN 978-0773727397.
- Granatstein, Jack (2016). The Weight of Command Voices of Canada's Second World War Generals and Those Who Knew Them. Vancouver: University of British Columbia Press. ISBN 9780774833028.

Military offices
Preceded by Charles Foulkes	GOC 2nd Canadian Infantry Division; 1944–1945	Succeeded by Post disbanded
Party political offices
Preceded by Duncan Kenneth MacTavish	President of the Liberal Party of Canada; 1958–1961	Succeeded by John Joseph Connolly
