= Ralph Holley Keefler =

Canadian soldier and businessman (1902–1983)

- Born: 12 September 1902; Weston, Ontario
- Died: 17 September 1983 (aged 81); Galway, County Galway
- Education: University of Toronto (BASc '24)
- Spouse: Beatrice Louise Taschereau (m. 1927)

Major General Ralph Holley Keefler CBE DSO ED (12 September 1902 – 17 September 1983) was a Canadian soldier and businessman. He was commander of the 3rd Canadian Infantry Division during the final stages of World War II and was chairman and president of Northern Electric (now Nortel Networks).

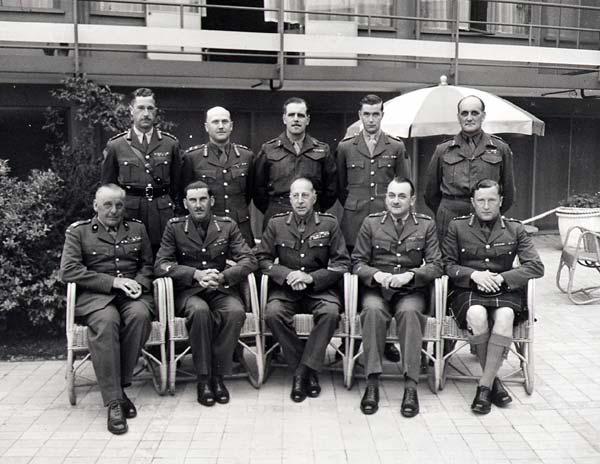
Senior commanders of the First Canadian Army, May 1945. Seated from the left: Stanisław Maczek (Polish Army), Guy Simonds, Harry Crerar, Charles Foulkes, Bert Hoffmeister. Standing from the left: Ralph Keefler, Bruce Matthews, Harry Foster, Robert Moncel (standing in for Chris Vokes), Stuart Rawlins (British Army).

Born in Weston, Ontario, the son of Joseph Keefler and Margaret Isabel Holley, he received a B.A.Sc. in Mechanical Engineering from the University of Toronto in 1924 and later joined the Bell Telephone Company. During World War II, he was the Major-General in command of the 3rd Canadian Infantry Division.

After the war, he became chairman and president of Northern Electric. In 1965 he was president of the Canadian Chamber of Commerce.

== See also ==
- John Roth

Military offices
Preceded by Daniel Spry	GOC 3rd Canadian Infantry Division; 1945	Succeeded by Post disbanded
Business positions
Preceded by Paul Fleetford Sise	President of the Northern Electric Company; 1948 –1964	Succeeded by Vernon Oswald Marquez
