= 7th Medium Regiment, Royal Canadian Artillery =

7th Medium Regiment Royal Canadian Artillery
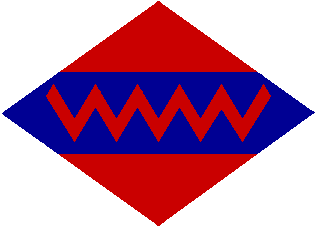
- Formation patch worn by RCA army troops
- Active: 1 September 1939 – 8 June 1945
- Disbanded: 8 June 1945
- Country: Canada
- Branch: Canadian Army
- Role: Artillery
- Equipment: 5.5-inch (140 mm) artillery piece x 16
- Engagements: Normandy, Liberation of the Netherlands

Commanders
- Notable commanders: Lt-Col. G.H. Ellis; Lt-Col. W.G. Myatt; Lt-Col. F.P. Haszard, OBE.

The 7th Medium Regiment, Royal Canadian Artillery, was one of six Canadian medium regiments that saw service in Britain and continental Europe in the Second World War, the others being the 1st, 2nd, 3rd, 4th, and 5th Medium Regiments. (There was no 6th Medium.)

The 1st, 2nd and 5th Mediums served in Italy, while the 3rd, 4th, and 7th were in northwest Europe. Three of these units (1st, 4th, and 7th) were each equipped with sixteen 5.5-inch (140 mm) guns, firing 100-pound shells, while the other three had 4.5-inch (110 mm) guns firing 60-pound shells.

Medium regiments were not part of the artillery component of the individual infantry or armoured divisions as were most field regiments (25-pounder guns) but were classed as "Army" troops and were available to support any formation which needed the fire of heavier guns.

The 7th Medium Regiment was raised in September 1939 with the mobilization of four Ontario militia field artillery batteries: the 12th (London), 45th (Lindsay), 97th (Walkerton) and 100th (Listowel). In the period from then until February 1941, during which time the regiment was at Petawawa, there were a number of organizational changes from which emerged the 7th Army Field Regiment, RCA, consisting of the 12th, 45th and 97th Batteries.

The 7th continued its training at Petawawa and in New Brunswick until November 1941, when it went overseas to England, where it spent over two and a half years in constant training. A major change occurred in November 1943 when the regiment was converted from Field to Medium, and gave up its 25-pounders for the much bigger 5.5 inch. In the process it became a two-battery regiment, and the 97th Battery was disbanded, most of its personnel, however, being absorbed by the other two larger batteries.

The war for the 7th Medium became the real thing when it crossed the Channel in the second week in July 1944, and from then until the end of the fighting in the first week of May 1945 it took part in all the major battles and actions in which First Canadian Army was engaged: Normandy, the Seine crossing, the Channel ports (Boulogne and Calais), the Scheldt, Bergen op Zoom, Nijmegen salient, the Rhineland, the Rhine crossing, the advance through central and northern Netherlands, and finally across the Ems River into northwest Germany.

The 7th Medium fired its first round in anger at Rots, near Caen, Normandy, shortly after 18:00 on 13 July 1944, and its last, also shortly after 18:00, from its last gun position at Veenheusen in Germany, a short distance from Emden, on 4 May 1945. In the course of 10 months in action, the 7th occupied about 60 gun positions, fired nearly 70,000 rounds of 100-pound shells in support of three Canadian divisions, most of the British divisions and the 1st Polish Armoured Division, all of the British 21st Army Group.

The major battles in which the 7th was engaged were of course Normandy, the Scheldt and the Rhineland. The fire program for the opening of the latter is reported to have been the largest in the West during the war: at 05:00 on 8 February 1945, 1,400 British and Canadian guns of all calibres opened fire at once in support of the British XXX Corps, consisting for the opening of the battle of four British divisions and the 2nd Canadian Infantry Division attacking east from Nijmegen into Germany. Included in the preliminary bombardment, which ended at 09:30, were 16 medium regiments (13 Royal Artillery and three Royal Canadian Artillery. This was followed at 10:00 by the 2½-hour barrage in support of XXX Corps infantry attacking into Germany. In the ten months in which the 7th Medium was in action it had 124 casualties, of which 35 were killed and 89 wounded (some of the latter returned to the unit on recovery).

In Normandy, during Operation Totalize, on 8 August 1944, a group of American bombers dropped their ordnance right on top of the 7th medium regiment, 12th battery, Royal Canadian Artillery. "The great problem on our side was road space, and it was while waiting in our gun positions, still firing at the retreating German forces, that the first disaster of the campaign befell us. A flight of American Fortresses flying high over 12th Battery area unloaded their bomb load right on top of the battery and on a nearby ammunition depot. B troop received most of the damage and Lt. J.E. Clark and ten other ranks were killed or died of wounds shortly afterwards. Captain W.G.Ferguson and eighteen other ranks were wounded and evacuated"

Several G.P.O.s from the 7th became 'Air Observation Post' pilots with No. 665 Squadron RCAF, and No. 666 Squadron RCAF: Lt. A.B. Culver, Lt. R.G. Everett, and Lt. R.A.S. Perley.

The 7th Medium Regiment, Royal Canadian Artillery, was disbanded on 8 June 1945.

== Music ==
The call to arms : the Canadian army marching song (1914) by W.J. Bugler, was dedicated to Lieutenant Colonel H.C. Becher, commanding, 7th Regiment Fusiliers, London, Ontario. Chorus: They will march and fight with a might that's right First line: British boys who play the war game.
