= Robert Moncel =

Canadian Army general (1917–2007)

Lieutenant General Robert William Moncel OC DSO OBE CD
- Born: 9 April 1917; Montreal, Quebec
- Died: 10 December 2007 (aged 90); Halifax, Nova Scotia
- Burial place: Fairview Lawn Cemetery
- Spouse: Nancy Allison Bell (m. 1939)
- Military career
- Allegiance: Canada
- Branch: Canadian Army
- Service years: 1937–1966
- Rank: Lieutenant-general
- Units: Victoria Rifles of Canada; The Royal Canadian Regiment
- Commands: 12th Manitoba Dragoons; 4th Canadian Armoured Brigade; Royal Canadian Armoured Corps; 3rd Canadian Infantry Brigade; Vice Chief of the Defence Staff
- Conflicts: World War II: Battle of France; Battle of Normandy; Operation Blockbuster
- Awards: Officer of the Order of Canada; Companion of the Distinguished Service Order; Officer of the Order of the British Empire; Canadian Forces' Decoration

Lieutenant General Robert William Moncel OC DSO OBE CD (9 April 1917 – 10 December 2007) was a senior officer in the Canadian Army. Moncel was Lieutenant-General of the Canadian Army and former Vice Chief of the Defence Staff. He was the youngest general officer in the Canadian Army when promoted to Brigadier on 27 August 1944, at the age of 27.

== Early life ==
Born in Montreal, Quebec, he was educated at Selwyn House School, Bishop's College School and McGill University. He served as an officer with the Victoria Rifles of Canada.

== World War II ==
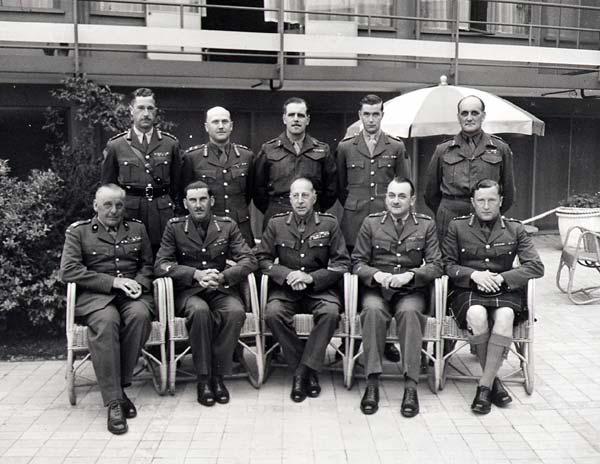
Senior commanders of the First Canadian Army, May 1945. Seated from the left: Stanisław Maczek (Polish Army), Guy Simonds, Harry Crerar, Charles Foulkes, Bert Hoffmeister. Standing from the left: Ralph Keefler, Bruce Matthews, Harry Foster, Robert Moncel (standing in for Chris Vokes), Stuart Rawlins (British Army).

When World War II broke out, Moncel went to Europe with the Royal Canadian Regiment (RCR). In May 1940, he was ordered along with the RCR to France to reinforce the British Expeditionary Force facing the German blitzkrieg. Soon however, Lieutenant Moncel, who commanded a Bren gun carrier platoon, was ordered to retreat to the French coast. When being evacuated, he was ordered to destroy his equipment to save it from German hands, but Moncel, with his cool judgement, managed to evacuate the Bren gun carriers. This act caught the eyes of his superiors and he was promoted to captain.

In 1941, he finished first on a staff course under the command of Guy Simonds, and was promoted to major in 1942, and lieutenant-colonel in January 1943. Moncel became the commanding officer of 18th Armoured Car Regiment (12th Manitoba Dragoons). Later, Moncel was posted as the General Staff Officer 1 of the II Canadian Corps, where he reorganized its general staff. Here, he was made an officer of the Order of the British Empire (OBE) and a chevalier of the Legion d'honneur (receiving the Croix de Guerre with Palme in the process). In August 1944 at the age of 27, he was promoted to brigadier, the youngest ever Canadian to achieve that rank.

In the Normandy campaign, he was the commanding officer of the 4th Canadian Armoured Brigade until the end of the war in 1945. During this, Moncel won the Distinguished Service Order (DSO) for his leadership of Tiger Group during the battle of Hochwald Forest, when the II Canadian Corps launched Operation Blockbuster.

== Post-War ==
After the war, in 1946, he was appointed Director of the Royal Canadian Armoured Corps. From 1947 to 1949, he served as Director of Military Training, Army Headquarters in Ottawa. From 1949 to 1950, he attended the National War College in Washington, DC. From 1951 to 1953, he was the Senior Canadian Army Liaison Officer to the United Kingdom. From 1954 to 1956, he was the Deputy Chief of General Staff. From 1957 to 1958, he was the Senior Canadian Military Officer, International Control Commission in Indochina. From 1957 to 1960, he was appointed Commander, 3rd Canadian Infantry Brigade at Camp Gagetown. From 1960 to 1963, he served as Quartermaster General of the Canadian Army. From 1963 to 1964, he was the Commander-in-Chief, Eastern Command. He served finally as Vice Chief of the Defence Staff 1965 to 1966. He retired in 1966 prior to unification of the armed services, which resulted in the formation of the Canadian Forces. In 1967, he was appointed a civilian coordinator for visits of heads of state to Canada during the Canadian Centennial year.

In 1967, Lieutenant-General Moncel was invested as an Officer of the Order of Canada. He died at the Camp Hill Veterans' Memorial Building in Halifax, Nova Scotia, on December 10, 2007, at the age of 90.

== See also ==
- List of Bishop's College School alumni

Military offices
| Preceded by Geoffrey Walsh | Vice Chief of the Defence Staff; 1965-1966 | Succeeded by Frederick Sharp |
