= Leslie Brown (RAF officer) =

Sir Leslie Oswald Brown
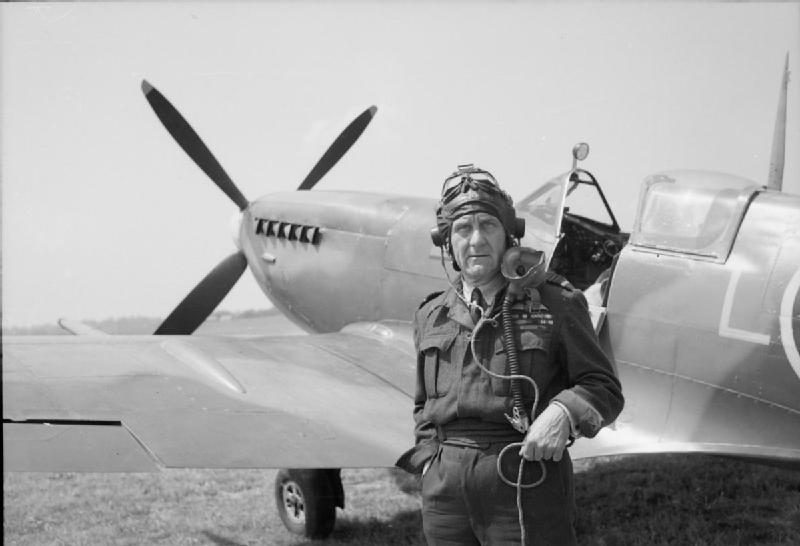
- Air Vice Marshal L. O. Brown, Air Officer Commanding No. 84 Group, standing by his personal Supermarine Spitfire at Odiham, Hampshire
- Born: 11 July 1893; Pietermaritzburg, South Africa
- Died: 28 June 1978 (aged 84)
- Military career
- Allegiance: United Kingdom
- Branch: Royal Air Force
- Service years: 1914 to 1949
- Rank: Air vice-marshal
- Commands: No. 20 Sqn; No 50 (Army Co-operation) Wing; 84 Group
- Awards: KCB – 1 Jan 1948; CB – 1 Jan 1945; CBE – 24 Sep 1941; DSC – 15 Jun 1917; AFC – 3 Jun 1919; MiD – 26 Jun 1931, 6 May 1932, 11 Jun 1942; King Haakon VII Liberty Cross – 12 Apr 1949

Sir Leslie "Bingo" Oswald Brown KCB CBE DSC AFC (11 July 1893 – 28 June 1978) was a South African who served with the Royal Air Force (RAF) in both World Wars, attaining the rank of air vice-marshal.

Brown served in East Africa, the Middle East and the United Kingdom. His first years were with the Royal Naval Air Service, before that was absorbed into the newly formed RAF.

He commanded No. 84 Group RAF as a temporary air vice-marshal during the allied advance across north west Europe, assigned to support the First Canadian Army's operations. His staff established extremely close operational contacts with their army opposite numbers, but this was not to the liking of his superior, Air Marshal Sir Arthur Coningham and he was replaced in November, 1944.

He was appointed Commandant of the School of Land/Air Warfare later in 1944 and reverted to his substantive rank of air commodore.

Brown was promoted to air vice-marshal in October 1946, retired from the RAF on 23 January 1949 and died on 28 June 1978.
