= Bert Hoffmeister =

Canadian army officer (1907–1999)

Bertram Hoffmeister
- Born: 15 May 1907; Vancouver, British Columbia
- Died: 4 December 1999 (aged 92)
- Spouse: Amber Donalda Strauss (m. 1935)
- Military career
- Allegiance: Canada
- Branch: Canadian Army
- Service years: 1927–1945
- Rank: Major General
- Unit: The Seaforth Highlanders of Canada
- Commands: Canadian Pacific Force (1945); 6th Canadian Infantry Division (1945); 5th Canadian (Armoured) Division (1944–45); 2nd Canadian Infantry Brigade (1943–44); The Seaforth Highlanders of Canada (1942–43)
- Conflicts: Second World War: Allied invasion of Sicily; Italian campaign; Moro River Campaign; Battle of Ortona; Liri Valley; Gothic Line; Battle of Rimini; Liberation of Arnhem; Battle of Otterlo; North-West Europe campaign of 1944–45
- Awards: Officer of the Order of Canada; Companion of the Order of the Bath; Commander of the Order of the British Empire; Distinguished Service Order & Two Bars; Efficiency Decoration; Mentioned in Despatches; Grand Officer of the Order of Orange-Nassau (Netherlands); Commander of the Legion of Merit (United States); Commander of the Mililtary Order of Italy (Italy)

Major General Bertram Meryl Hoffmeister, OC, CB, CBE, DSO & Two Bars, ED (15 May 1907 – 4 December 1999) was a Canadian Army officer, businessman, and conservationist. He served with distinction during the last two years of the Second World War, becoming, in Jack Granatstein's words, "the best Canadian fighting general of the war", rising from captain and a company commander in 1939 to major general and commander of the 5th Canadian (Armoured) Division in 1944.

== Early life and career ==
Born in Vancouver, British Columbia to parents Louis and Flora, Hoffmeister was a sales manager with the Canadian White Pine Co. Ltd. in Vancouver. He enlisted with the Non-Permanent Active Militia (NPAM, the Canadian Army Reserve Force) in 1927. He was promoted captain in 1934. After he was promoted to major, in 1939, he was made officer commanding a company of the Seaforth Highlanders of Canada, who went to England in 1939, the year the Second World War began, as part of Andrew McNaughton's 1st Canadian Division.

== Second World War ==
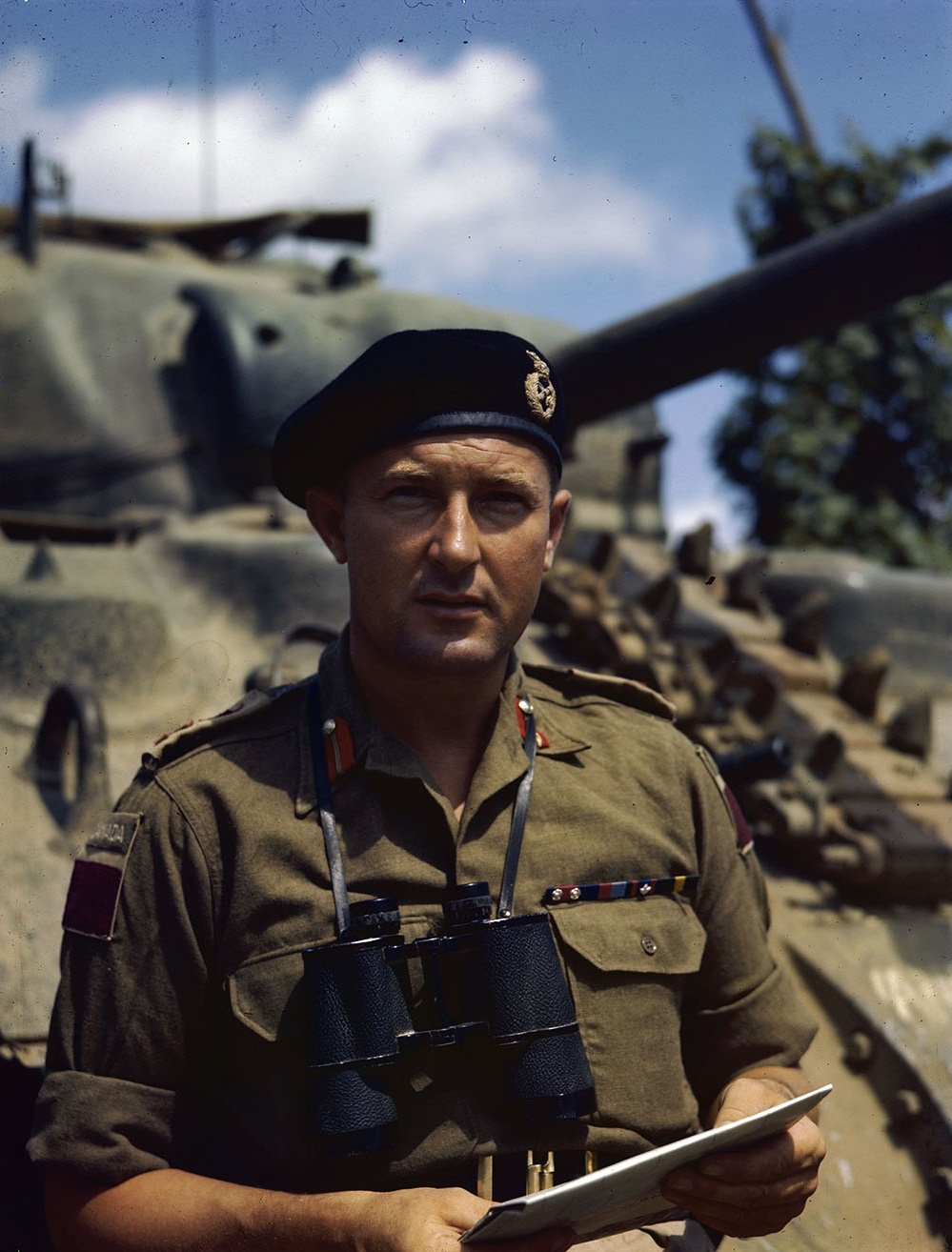
Bert Hoffmeister in Italy, 1944.

Hoffmeister attended the Canadian Junior War Staff courses at the Royal Military College of Canada in Kingston, Ontario. On 11 October 1942, he was promoted to lieutenant colonel. In November 1943, he was awarded the Distinguished Service Order (DSO) while fighting in Sicily as a battalion commander. He received a Bar to his DSO the following year, in April, and another Bar in August.

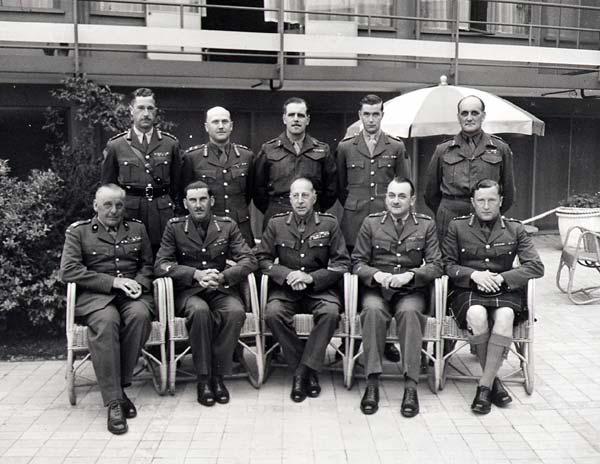
Senior commanders of the First Canadian Army, May 1945. Seated from the left: Stanisław Maczek (Polish Army), Guy Simonds, Harry Crerar, Charles Foulkes, Bert Hoffmeister. Standing from the left: Ralph Keefler, Bruce Matthews, Harry Foster, Robert Moncel (standing in for Chris Vokes, Stuart Rawlins (British Army).

In October 1943, promoted to brigadier, Hoffmeister was named commanding officer of the 2nd Canadian Infantry Brigade, which fought in the early stages of the Italian campaign, including at the Battle of Ortona towards the end of the year.

On 20 March 1944, as a reward for his successful command of the 2nd Brigade, he was promoted to major general and made general officer commanding (GOC) the 5th Canadian Armoured Division.

After Victory in Europe Day, he was made GOC of the 6th Canadian Division (Canadian Pacific Force) which disbanded after the atomic bombings of Japan. Hoffmeister retired from active service in September 1945. That same year, he was made a Grand Officer of the Order of Orange-Nassau with swords as well as a Companion of the Order of the Bath, and a Commander of the Order of the British Empire. In 1947, he was made a Commander of the Legion of Merit.

== Post-war ==
After the war, Hoffmeister became president of MacMillan Bloedel Limited in 1949 and was its chairman from 1956 to 1958. From 1958 to 1961, he was British Columbia's agent general in London. From 1961 to 1968, he was chairman of the Council of Forest Industries of British Columbia, an association for the British Columbia interior forest industry. From 1971 to 1991 he was the founding chairman of the Nature Trust of British Columbia, a non-profit land conservation organization.

In 1982, Hoffmeister was made an Officer of the Order of Canada.

== Bibliography ==
- Douglas E. Delaney (2006). The Soldiers' General: Bert Hoffmeister at War. University of British Columbia Press. ISBN 0-7748-1149-8.
- Granatstein, Jack (2005). The Generals: The Canadian Army's Senior Commanders in the Second World War. University of Calgary Press. ISBN 978-1-55238-176-2.

Military offices
Preceded by E. L. M. Burns	GOC 5th (Canadian) Armoured Division; 1944–1945	Succeeded by Post disbanded
