= Harry Wickwire Foster =

WWII Canadian Army officer

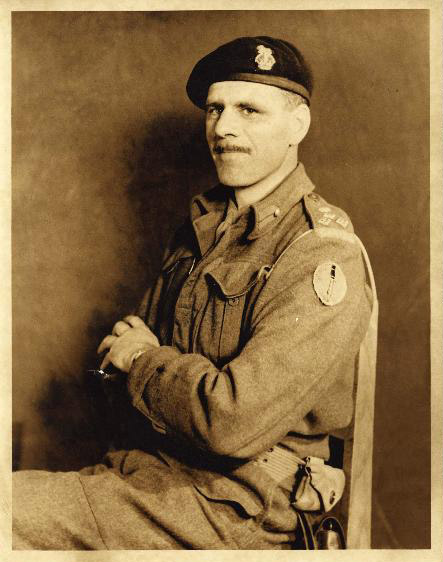
- Major General Harry Foster in 1944
- Born: 2 April 1902; Halifax, Nova Scotia, Canada
- Died: 16 August 1964 (aged 62)
- Burial place: Kentville, Nova Scotia, Canada
- Military career
- Allegiance: Canada
- Branch: Canadian Army
- Service years: 1924–1952
- Rank: Major General
- Unit: Lord Strathcona's Horse (Royal Canadians)
- Commands: 4th Princess Louise Dragoon Guards; Highland Light Infantry of Canada; 13th Canadian Infantry Brigade; 7th Canadian Infantry Brigade; 1st Canadian Infantry Division; 4th Canadian (Armoured) Division
- Conflicts: World War II
- Awards: Commander of the Order of the British Empire; Distinguished Service Order; Mentioned in Despatches; Silver Star (United States); Legion of Merit (United States); Legion of Honour (France); Croix de guerre (France)

Major General Harry Wickwire Foster, CBE, DSO (April 2, 1902 – August 6, 1964) was a senior Canadian Army officer who commanded two Canadian divisions during World War II. He served in both the Pacific and European theatres.

== Early life ==
Born in Halifax, he was the son of Major General Gilbert Lafayette Foster, who had been the director general of the medical services of the First World War. Foster was educated at King's College at Windsor, Nova Scotia as a cadet. He attended school at Berkhamsted, England; Bishop's College School in Lennoxville, Quebec; Royal Military College of Canada, Kingston, Ontario; and McGill University, Montreal.

== Military career ==
Having failed his third year, but with a Certificate of Military Qualification (which all cadets earned when they finished two full years at RMC) Foster withdrew from RMC to receive the King's commission and a posting to the Permanent Force (PF) with Lord Strathcona's Horse on July 2, 1924. As a young officer, he spent years in debt: the army paid only for saddle, harness, and stabling. He had to pay for his own horse (which cost nearly a month's salary) and for mess, uniforms, and tailoring.

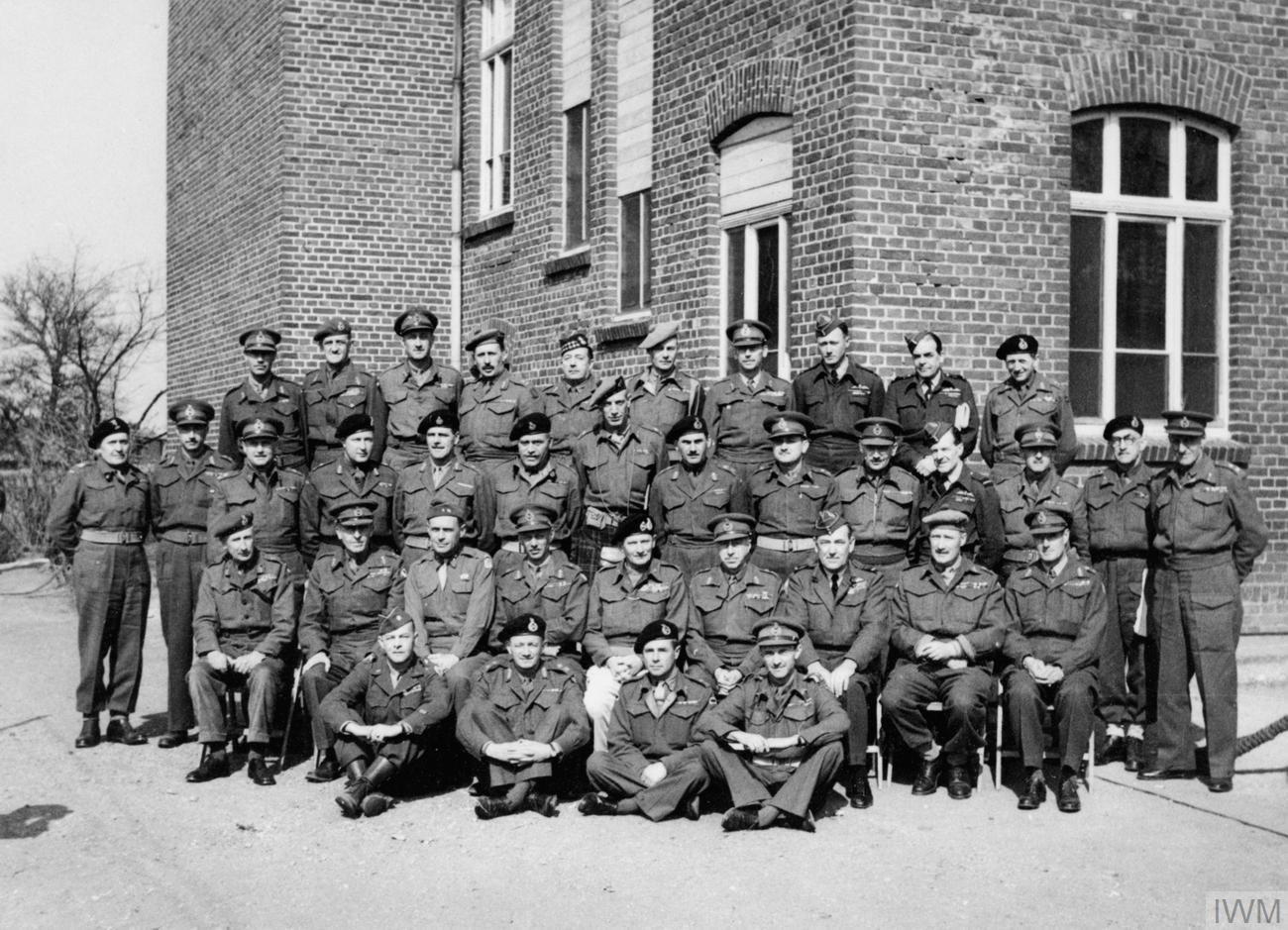
Field Marshal Sir Bernard Montgomery poses for a group photograph with members of his staff, along with his corps and division commanders, at Walbeck, Germany, 22 March 1945. Pictured standing in the third row, fifth from the right, is Major General Harry Foster.

By 1934 he held the rank of captain. He attended the Staff College, Camberley, from 1937 to 1939 and was promoted to major and posted as brigade major of the 1st Canadian Infantry Brigade at the outbreak of the Second World War.

In 1941, promoted to lieutenant colonel, Foster assumed command of 4th Reconnaissance Battalion (4th Princess Louise Dragoon Guards), the recently activated scout formation assigned to 1st Canadian Infantry Division in England. In 1942, he was appointed commanding officer of the 1st Battalion, The Highland Light Infantry of Canada.

He led Canadian troops of the 13th Canadian Infantry Brigade in the Kiska campaign in 1943 (Operation Cottage), for which he was awarded the American Legion of Merit. Unknown to the Allies, the Japanese had withdrawn three weeks before the attack. Foster commented in his diary "I feel bloody silly coming all this way for nothing."

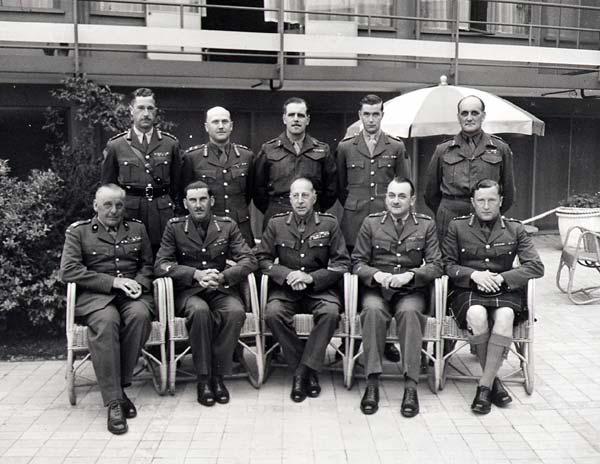
Senior commanders of the First Canadian Army, May 1945. Seated from the left: Stanisław Maczek (Polish Army), Guy Simonds, Harry Crerar, Charles Foulkes, Bert Hoffmeister. Standing from the left: Ralph Keefler, Bruce Matthews, Harry Foster, Robert Moncel (standing in for Chris Vokes), Stuart Rawlins (British Army).

In 1943, he was promoted to brigadier and became the commanding officer of the 7th Canadian Infantry Brigade. which landed on Juno beach on D-Day.

In 1944 he was promoted to major general and took over 4th Canadian (Armoured) Division in Normandy, relieving George Kitching. On September 12, 1944, he entered the historic city of Bruges (Belgium) with his troops. The liberation of this medieval town was done successfully, without fight or damage. In recognition for this achievement, Foster was named an honorary citizen of Bruges, an award bestowed upon only two people since 1900: Foster and Hendrik Brugmans, first rector of the College of Europe.

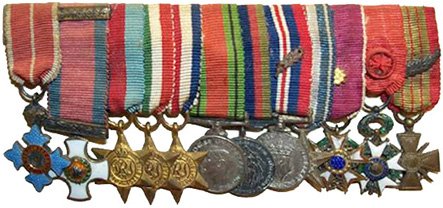
The miniature medals of Major General Harry Foster.

Later, swapping commands with Chris Vokes (because Vokes had a poor relationship with new I Canadian Corps commander Charles Foulkes), he led the 1st Canadian Infantry Division in Italy, then returned with this division to North-West Europe as part of Operation Goldflake.

Foster was said to have had a "hands off" style and loathed paperwork.

Foster was appointed a Companion of the Distinguished Service Order in January 1945 and appointed a Commander of the Order of the British Empire in July 1945.

== Post-war ==
After the war, Foster (with four brigadiers) presided over the court martial of Canada's top prisoner of war, SS General Kurt Meyer. The trial was a showcase for Canada, the first time that the country had conducted an international prosecution of this sort. Meyer was found guilty of three of five charges and sentenced to death. The sentence was later commuted to life imprisonment. When asked by his son (author Tony Foster) why the death sentence had been imposed he replied, "Because I had no choice according to those rules of warfare dreamt up by a bunch of bloody barrack-room lawyers who had never heard a shot fired in anger."

Foster organized and commanded Eastern Command (Canada) from 1946. Upon retirement in 1952 he took the civilian appointment of chief administrator of the Central European District, Imperial War Graves Commission. In 1959, he married his third wife Mona Leonhart (née Parsons), a Canadian spy for the Dutch Resistance during the Second World War, and was appointed honorary aide-de-camp to Governor General Georges Vanier.

Harry Foster had two sons, Anthony (Tony) Foster and David Foster. Tony Foster wrote a biography of his father's life, with particular emphasis on his interactions with Kurt Meyer, both on the battlefield and in the courtroom. Entitled Meeting of Generals, the book won Canada's Evelyn Richardson Memorial Non-Fiction Award and the Canadian Authors Association Award for best Non-Fiction in 1987.

The Foster family donated Harry's military uniforms, medals, battle maps and other historical items of interest to the Army Museum of the Halifax Citadel where they are part of the WWII display.

== Notes ==
Military offices
Preceded by George Kitching	GOC 4th Canadian (Armoured) Division; August–November 1944	Succeeded by Christopher Vokes
Preceded by Christopher Vokes	GOC 1st Canadian Infantry Division; 1944–1945	Post disbanded
