= Christopher Vokes =

Canadian Army officer (1904–1985)

Major General Christopher Vokes CB, CBE, DSO, CD
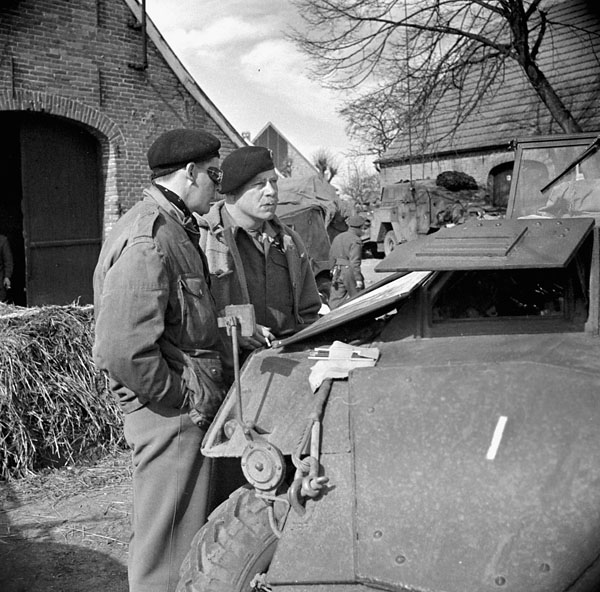
- Brigadier Robert Moncel (left) and Major General Christopher Vokes, 10 April 1945
- Born: 13 April 1904; Armagh, Ireland
- Died: 27 March 1985 (aged 80); Oakville, Ontario
- Military career
- Allegiance: Canada
- Branch: Canadian Army
- Rank: Major General
- Nicknames: "Butcher" "Chris"
- Unit: Royal Canadian Engineers
- Commands: 2nd Canadian Infantry Brigade; 1st Canadian Infantry Division; 4th Canadian Armoured Division
- Conflicts: World War II Invasion of Sicily Battle of Ortona Battle of the Hochwald
- Awards: Companion of the Order of the Bath; Commander of the Order of the British Empire; Distinguished Service Order; Canadian Forces' Decoration
- Other work: General Officer Commanding the Canadian Army Occupation Force in Europe

Major-General Christopher Vokes CB, CBE, DSO, CD (13 April 1904 – 27 March 1985) was a Canadian Army officer who fought in World War II. Born in Armagh, Ireland, he commanded the 2nd Canadian Infantry Brigade during the Allied invasion of Sicily. Promoted to major-general, Vokes led the 1st Canadian Infantry Division through several battles of the Italian campaign, which included fierce house-to-house fighting in the Battle of Ortona and the advance north to the Hitler Line.

In 1944, he took over command of the 4th Canadian Armoured Division and fought in Operation Blockbuster. During the latter stages of this battle, Vokes ordered his division to raze the German town of Friesoythe. The division subsequently destroyed around 85–90% of the town and used the rubble to make good the cratered local roads. After the war, he commanded the Canadian Army Occupation Force in Europe, before returning to Canada to undertake further command assignments. Vokes retired in 1959 and died in 1985 at the age of 80.

== Family ==
Born in the town of Armagh, Ireland, on 13 April 1904, Vokes was the son of a British officer, Major Frederick Patrick Vokes, and Elizabeth Vokes. They came to Canada in 1910 and Vokes's father served as the engineering officer at the Royal Military College of Canada (RMC). The family lived in the Married Quarters at Ridout Row, RMC.

Christopher Vokes's brother, Lieutenant-Colonel Frederick Vokes, took a leading part in the assault on Dieppe in August 1942. In early 1944 he was sent to Italy as commanding officer of the 9th Armoured Regiment (The British Columbia Dragoons). On 31 August 1944 he was seriously wounded in action and died in a field hospital on 4 September.

== Early military service ==
From 1921 to 1925 Vokes attended the Royal Military College of Canada and was commissioned into the Royal Canadian Engineers. He then attended McGill University from 1926 to 1927 where he received a Bachelor of Science degree and was a member of the Kappa Alpha Society. From 1934 to 1935 he attended Staff College, Camberley in England. While there he received a promotion to captain in January 1934. In Depression-era Canada many military bases were improved by civilians working in relief camps under supervision of professional military officers, including Camp Dundurn. The original engineer drawings for the concrete rifle range butts were signed by Chris Vokes, in that capacity. Barrack blocks in Dundurn resemble similar buildings constructed at Camp Valcartier in the same time frame.

== World War II ==
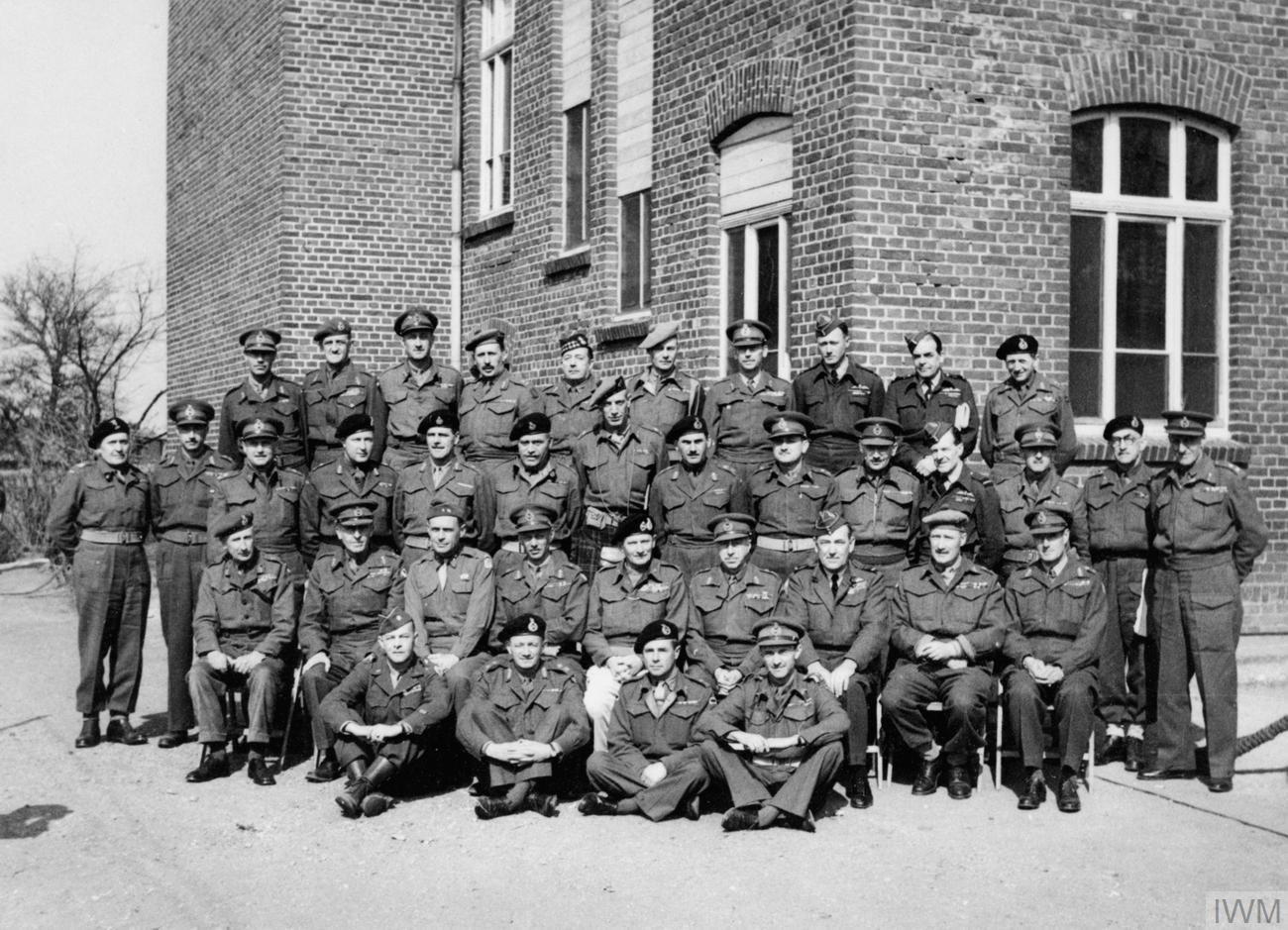
Field Marshal Sir Bernard Montgomery poses for a group photograph with members of his staff, along with his corps and division commanders, at Walbeck, Germany, 22 March 1945. Pictured standing in the third row, sixth from the right, is Major General Christopher Vokes.

Starting in 1939, the year World War II began in Europe, Vokes rapidly rose through the ranks of the Canadian General Staff. With the 1st Canadian Infantry Division, he served as Adjutant General, Assistant Quartermaster General, General Staff Officer, grade 1, and as Officer Commanding Princess Patricia’s Canadian Light Infantry. He proved to be an outstanding operational officer and in June 1942 was promoted to brigadier and put in charge of the 2nd Canadian Infantry Brigade. The 2nd was one of three brigades forming part of the 1st Canadian Infantry Division, with which he had served since 1939 and which was then commanded by Major-General George Pearkes until Major-General H. L. N. Salmon replaced him in September (although he, too, was replaced by Major-General Guy Simonds after being killed in a plane crash in April 1943). Vokes commanded his brigade the following year during the Allied invasion of Sicily (codenamed Operation Husky) from July−August 1943, which was followed soon afterwards by Operation Baytown, part of the Allied invasion of Italy and the beginning of the Italian campaign, in early September. One historian lauded his performance throughout the war:

Vokes was a successful commander because he maintained a good balance between technical skills such as planning and directing operations and his ability to understand, motivate, and lead soldiers, and because his actions were guided by a sound philosophy of command based on personal leadership and teamwork. These elements allowed Christopher Vokes to train and lead a highly effective and cohesive fighting force that defeated some of Germany's best troops in the physically demanding environment of the Sicilian battlefield.

Shortly after the beginning of the Italian campaign, Vokes temporarily took command of the 1st Canadian Division after its current General Officer Commanding (GOC), Major-General Simonds, fell ill, with Bert Hoffmeister taking over the 2nd Canadian Brigade. He soon became the division's permanent GOC and was promoted to the rank of major general on 1 November 1943. Vokes led the division during the Battle of Ortona, after which he was criticized for unimaginative tactics and frontal assaults. General Sir Bernard Montgomery, the commander of the British Eighth Army (under whose command the 1st Canadian Division had been serving since July), ordered Vokes's 1st Canadian Division to attack along the coast towards Ortona early in December. During an attack on a ravine southwest of Ortona, Vokes continued to send battalion after battalion to attack the mine-fortified German defense for nine days. For this he became known as the "Butcher" among his men. An impatient Montgomery sent messages wondering why the attack took so long. At the same time, the Canadians became aware of the fact that they were fighting not only Panzer-Grenadiers, but also the 1st Parachute Division, whom they recognized by their characteristic helmets. On the 21 December the Canadians broke through, and German forces destroyed the old town: the Fallschirmjägers continued to hold the town ruins for over a week, deploying mines and booby-traps. After the battle Vokes broke out in tears due to his division's losses – 2,300 casualties, among them 500 dead, as well as many cases of war neuroses.

He remained in command of the division throughout much subsequent hard fighting, including in the fighting to break the Gothic Line. Throughout most of this period Vokes's division was serving under command of I Canadian Corps, commanded first by Lieutenant-General Harry Crerar until he was replaced by Lieutenant-General E. L. M. Burns towards the end of March 1944 after Crerar went to Britain to assume command of the First Canadian Army. The relationship between Vokes and Burns, who had been one of Vokes's instructors at the RMC some twenty years earlier, steadily declined throughout 1944, with Burns eventually being sacked and replaced by Lieutenant-General Charles Foulkes, who Vokes despised. As a result, in December 1944, Vokes exchanged commands with Major-General Harry Foster, GOC of the 4th Canadian (Armoured) Division. The division was then serving in Northwest Europe, and which later fought in the Battle of the Hochwald in early 1945.

=== Destruction of Friesoythe ===
In April 1945, the town of Friesoythe was attacked by the 4th Canadian (Armoured) Division, under General Vokes. Most of the town's 4,000 people moved to the surrounding countryside on about 11–12 April 1945.

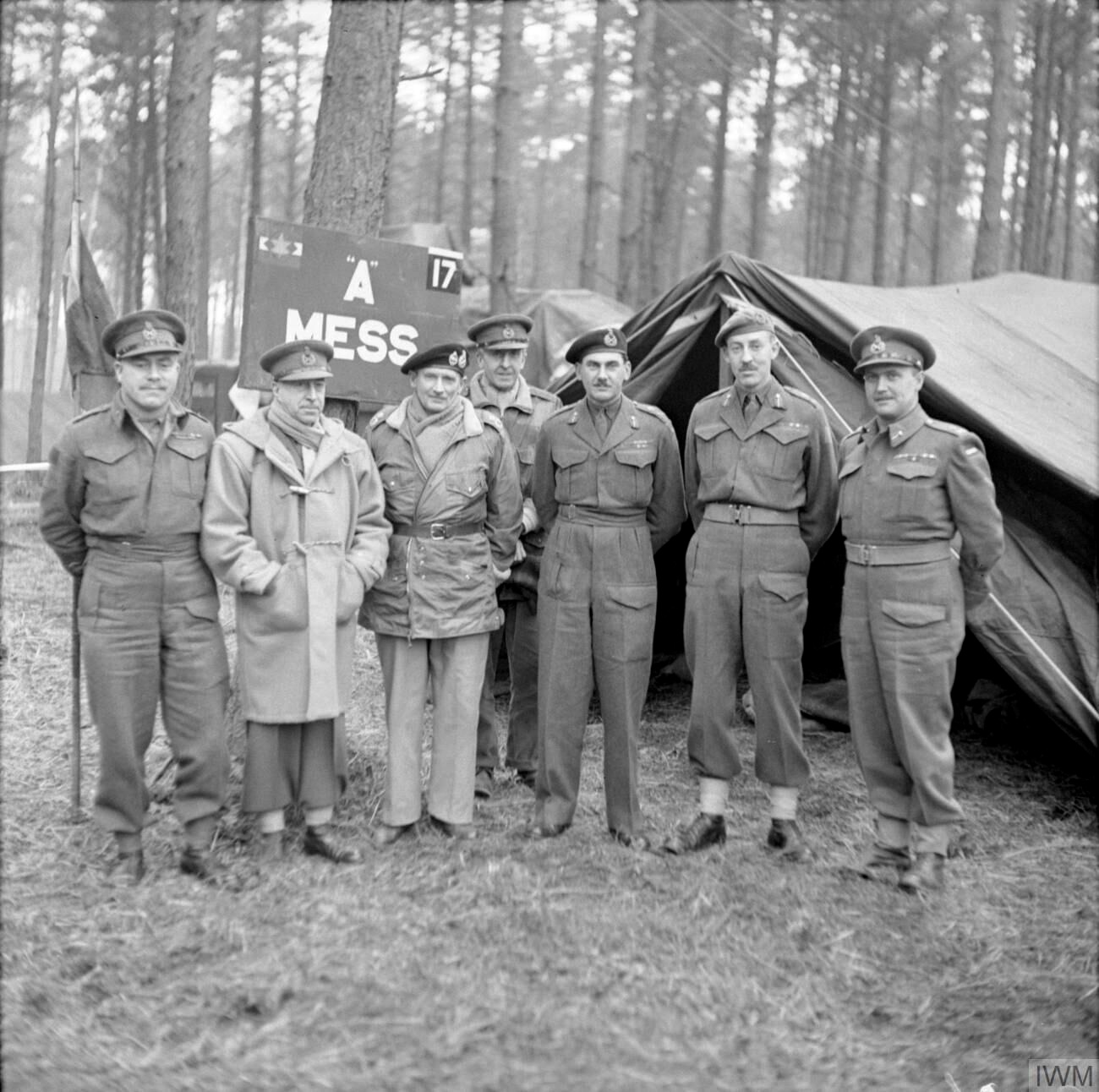
From left to right, Major-General Christoper Vokes, General Harry Crerar, Field Marshal Sir Bernard Montgomery, Lieutenant-General Brian Horrocks, Lieutenant-General Guy Simonds, Major-General Daniel Spry, and Major-General Bruce Matthews, pictured here in early 1945 during Operation Veritable.

The town was defended by some 200 paratroopers of Battalion Raabe of the 7th German Parachute Division. These paratroopers repelled the first attack by the Lake Superior Regiment (Motor) on 13 April. The Lake Superior Regiment suffered two dead and nineteen wounded. German casualties are not known. Vokes ordered the resumption of the attack the next day by The Argyll and Sutherland Highlanders of Canada (Princess Louise's) commanded by Lieutenant Colonel Frederick E. Wigle. The attack went well, with the Argylls securing the town by 10:30 hours. However, at 08:30 a small number of German soldiers caught Wigle's tactical headquarters by surprise; resulting in the death of Wigle and several other soldiers.

Vokes determined on an immediate reprisal. "A first-rate officer of mine, for whom I had a special regard and affection, and in whom I had a particular professional interest because of his talent for command, was killed. Not merely killed, it was reported to me, but sniped in the back". Vokes then announced his draconian decision. "I summoned my GSO1 . . 'Mac,' I roared at him, 'I'm going to raze that goddam town. Tell 'em we're going to level the fucking place. Get the people the hell out of their houses first.'"

You should know our soldiers were kind to the children of our enemies, and kind to those in adversity. And they were, on the whole, great ambassadors for Canada.

— Major-General Christopher Vokes in his autobiography

Units and soldiers of the Argylls had spontaneously begun the arson of Friesoythe to revenge the death of their colonel, but after Vokes issued his direct order, the town was systematically set on fire with flamethrowers mounted on Wasp Carriers. The rubble was used to reinforce district roads for the division's tanks. According to German estimates, 85% to 90% of the town was destroyed, making it one of the most devastated towns in Germany at the time. Vokes said that he had "no feeling of remorse over the elimination of Friesoythe."

== Later career ==
From June 1945 to May 1946 Vokes was the General Officer Commanding the Canadian Army Occupation Force in Europe. Returning to Canada, he commanded the Canadian Army's Central Command and then Western Command. He retired to Oakville, Ontario in 1959 and in 1985 published his memoirs, My Story. He died of cancer on 27 March 1985, aged 80.

== Arms ==
Coat of arms of Christopher Vokes
Adopted 1957 Crest A bear rampant proper charged on the shoulder with a trefoil, standing on a mural crown Or Escutcheon Per pale Gules and Vert in chief two maple leaves and in base a trefoil Or Motto PRESS ON Orders Companion of the Order of the Bath: TRIA JUNCTA IN UNO (Latin for 'Three joined in one'); ICH DIEN (German for 'I serve'); Companion of the Order of the British Empire; Distinguished Service Order Other elements Laurel wreath behind the shield indicate armiger is a recipient of the military division of the Order of the Bath

== Notes ==
Military offices
Preceded by Guy Simonds	GOC 1st Canadian Infantry Division; 1943–1944	Succeeded by Harry Foster
Preceded by Harry Foster	GOC 4th Canadian Armoured Division; 1944–1945	Succeeded by Post disbanded
