= First Canadian Army =

Formation of the Canadian Army in World War II

- Formation patch worn by army-level personnel.
- Active: 1942–1946
- Country: Canada
- Branch: Canadian Army
- Type: Field army
- Role: Canadian Army force also with UK and other national elements in World War II
- Size: 251,000
- Part of: 21st Army Group
- Engagements: World War II

Commanders
- 1942–1943: Andrew McNaughton
- 1943–1944: Kenneth Stuart (acting)
- 1944: Guy Simonds (acting)
- 1944–1945: Harry Crerar

The First Canadian Army (French: 1^{re}Armée canadienne) was a field army and a formation of the Canadian Army in World War II in which most Canadian elements serving in North-West Europe were assigned. It served on the Western Front from July 1944 until May 1945. It was Canada's first and, so far, only field army.

The army was formed in early 1942, replacing the existing unnumbered Canadian Corps, as the growing contribution of Canadian forces to serve with the British Army in the United Kingdom necessitated an expansion to two corps. By the end of 1943 Canadian formations consisted of three infantry divisions, two armoured divisions and two independent armoured brigades. The first commander was Lieutenant-General A. G. L. "Andy" McNaughton, who was replaced in 1944 by General H. D. G. "Harry" Crerar. Both had been senior Royal Regiment of Canadian Artillery officers in the Canadian Corps in World War I. Allied formations of other nationalities were added to the First Canadian Army to keep it at full strength.

The First Canadian Army's strength was 177,000 all ranks at the end of 1942. One year later it had grown to 242,000. On 31 May 1944, shortly before the Normandy landings, Canadian troops in Europe numbered 251,000 of which 75,000 had left First Canadian Army to serve on the Italian Front.

== History ==
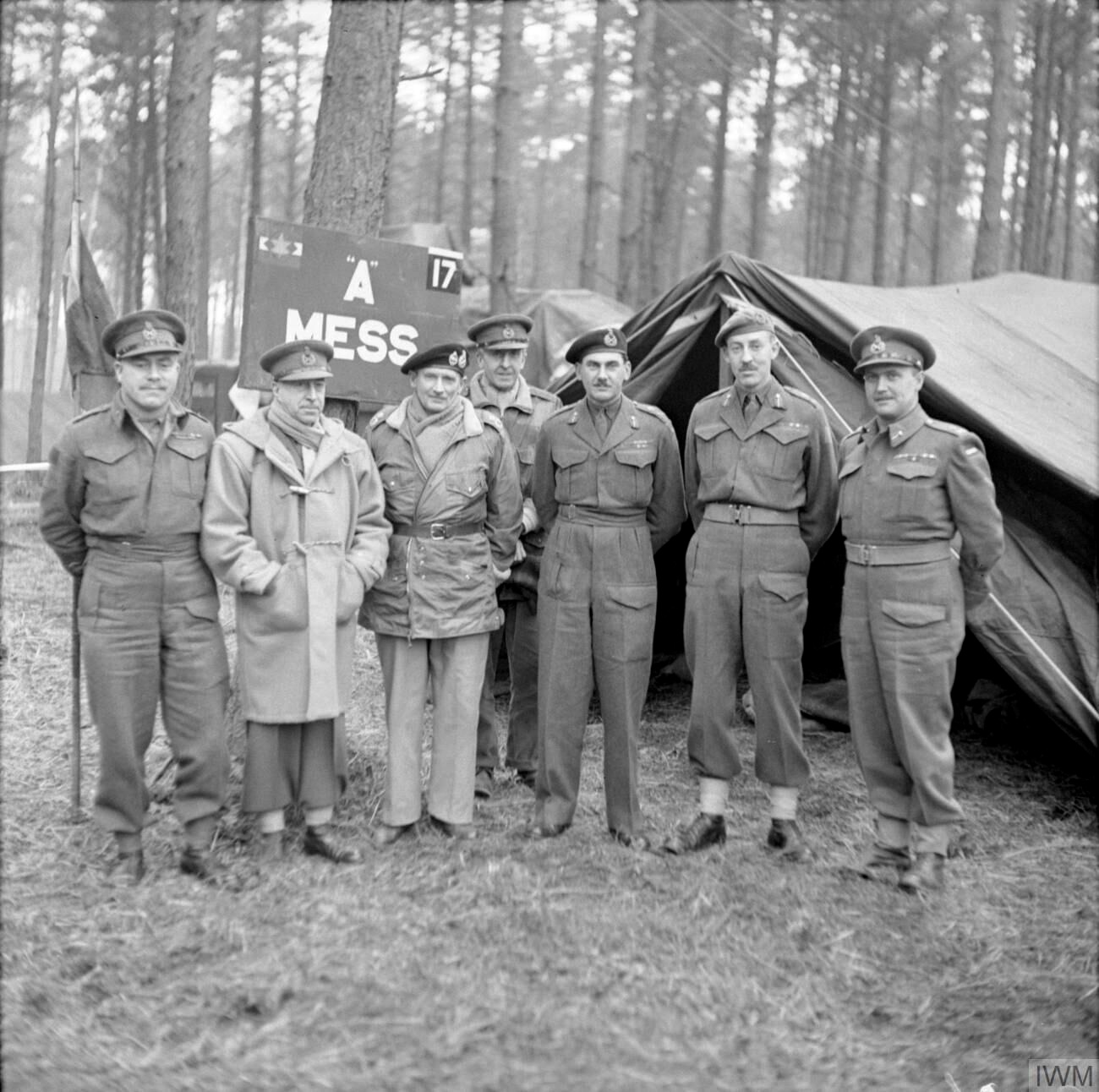
From left to right: General officers Christopher Vokes, Harry Crerar, Sir Bernard Montgomery, Brian Horrocks (both British Army), Guy Simonds, Daniel Spry and Bruce Mathews (February 1945)

When the First Canadian Army was formed overseas in 1942, Lieutenant-General Andrew McNaughton's aim was to keep Canada's contributions to the British Army together to lead the cross-channel assault on northwest Europe. Two brigades of the 2nd Canadian Division led the ill-fated Dieppe Raid in 1942. Aside from this endeavour, the field army did not see combat until July 1943. In 1943, because the Canadian government wanted Canadian troops to see action immediately, the 1st Canadian Infantry Division, 1st Canadian Armoured Brigade, and 5th Canadian Armoured Division were detached from the field army for participation in the Italian Campaign.

In early 1944, the 3rd Canadian Infantry Division and 2nd Canadian Armoured Brigade were also detached to British I Corps to participate in the assault phase of the Normandy landings. II Canadian Corps became operational in Normandy in early July 1944, as the 2nd Canadian Infantry Division landed. The First Canadian Army headquarters did not itself arrive in Normandy until mid-July, becoming operational on 23 July 1944 just before 4th Canadian Armoured Division arriving on the Continent.

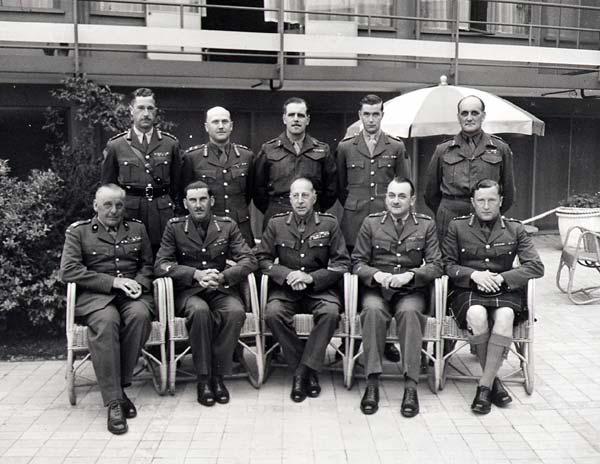
Senior commanders of the First Canadian Army, May 1945. Seated from the left: Stanisław Maczek (Polish Army), Guy Simonds, Harry Crerar, Charles Foulkes, Bert Hoffmeister. Standing from the left: Ralph Keefler, Bruce Matthews, Harry Foster, Robert Moncel (standing in for Chris Vokes), Stuart Rawlins (British Army).

During Operation Overlord, the First Canadian Army was under the control of the British 21st Army Group. The Army proper went into action in the Battle of Normandy and conducted operations aimed at Falaise. Totalize was the first major operation carried out by the army, followed by Operation Tractable and the closing of the Falaise pocket. After reaching the Seine, the objective of the first phase of Operation Overlord, the field army moved along the coast towards Belgium, with the Canadian 2nd Division entering Dieppe at the beginning of September. The First Army, under acting command of Lieutenant-General Guy Simonds (from 28 September 1944 to 7 November 1944), fought the critical Battle of the Scheldt along with the supporting Operation Pheasant in October and early November, opening Antwerp for Allied shipping.

The First Canadian Army held a static line along the river Meuse (Maas) from December through February, then launched Operation Veritable in early February. By this point, the field army, besides the II Canadian Corps, contained nine British divisions. The Siegfried Line was broken and the field army reached the banks of the Rhine in early March.

In the final weeks of the war in Europe, the First Army cleared the Netherlands of German forces. By this time the First Division and Fifth (Armoured) Division as well as First Armoured Brigade and the 1st Cdn AGRA had returned to the field army during Operation Goldflake, and for the first time, both the I Canadian Corps and II Canadian Corps fought under the same army commander.

== Makeup ==
The First Canadian Army was international in character. The size of Canada's military contribution on its own would likely not have justified the creation of a separate army-level command in North-West Europe, especially over the period when I Canadian Corps was away gaining valuable combat experience in Italy. However, both McNaughton and Crerar, backed up by the Canadian government, were successful in their lobbying for the British Army to create a Canadian-led army enlarged with contributions from other Allied countries. In addition to II Canadian Corps (which included the Canadian formations under command described above), other formations under command included the British I Corps, and the 1st Polish Armoured Division, as well as, at various times, the American 104th Infantry Division (Timberwolf), 1st Belgian Infantry Brigade, Royal Netherlands Motorized Infantry Brigade and 1st Czechoslovak Armoured Brigade. The First Canadian Army in North-West Europe during the final phases of the war comprised the largest field army ever under the control of a Canadian general. Ration strength of the army ranged from approximately 105,000 to 175,000 Canadian soldiers to anywhere from 200,000 to over 450,000 when including the soldiers from other nations.

The 'Maple Leaf Route' was the designation of the army's main supply route. The route was usually divided into Maple Leaf Up and Maple Leaf Down, designating traffic to and away from the front, respectively.

== Order of battle ==
Second World War 1939–1945

- First Canadian Army
  - Headquarters
    - First Canadian Army Defence Battalion - Lorne Scots (until April 1944) & Royal Montreal Regiment
    - No. 1 Army Headquarters Car Company, Royal Canadian Army Service Corps (RCASC)
  - Royal Canadian Artillery
    - No. 1 Army Group, R.C.A.(1st Cdn AGRA)
      - 11th Army Field Regiment
      - 1st Medium Regiment, Royal Canadian Artillery
      - 2nd Medium Regiment, Royal Canadian Artillery
      - 5th Medium Regiment, Royal Canadian Artillery
      - 56th Heavy Regiment, Royal Artillery (from Mar 1945)
    - No. 2 Army Group, R.C.A.(2nd Cdn AGRA)
      - 19th Army Field Regiment
      - 3rd Medium Regiment, Royal Canadian Artillery
      - 4th Medium Regiment, Royal Canadian Artillery
      - 7th Medium Regiment, Royal Canadian Artillery
      - 10th Medium Regiment, Royal Artillery
      - 15th Medium Regiment, Royal Artillery, (disb Dec 44)
      - 1st Heavy Regiment, Royal Artillery
      - 2nd Heavy Anti-Aircraft Regiment (Mobile)
      - 1st Rocket Battery
      - 1st Radar Battery
  - "F" Squadron, 25th Armoured Delivery Regiment (The Elgin Regiment), Canadian Armoured Corps (CAC)
  - 1st Canadian Armoured Personnel Carrier Squadron, CAC (August to October 1944)
  - No. 6 Casualty Clearing Station, Royal Canadian Army Medical Corps (RCAMC)
  - Nos. 4, 5, 6 & 7 Field Transfusion Units, RCAMC
  - Nos. 9, 10 & 11 Field Dressing Stations, RCAMC
  - No. 14 Field Hygiene Section, RCAMC
  - units of the Canadian Dental Corps (CDC)
  - Nos. 81 & 82 Artillery Companies, RCASC
  - Nos. 35 & 36 Army Troops Composite Companies, RCASC
  - Nos. 41, 45, 47, 63 & 64 Army Transport Companies, RCASC
  - Nos. 1 & 2 Motor Ambulance Convoys, RCASC
  - Royal Canadian Engineers
    - First Canadian Army Troops Engineers
      - 10th Field Park Company
      - 5th, 20th & 23rd Field Companies
    - 2nd Canadian Army Troops Engineers
      - 11th Field Park Company
      - 32nd, 33rd & 34th Field Companies
    - No. 1 Workshop and Park Company
    - 1st Field (Air) Survey Company
    - 2nd Field Survey Company
    - 3rd Field (Reproduction) Company
  - First Army Signals, Royal Canadian Corps of Signals (RCCS)
  - 1st Air Support Signals Unit
  - Nos. 1, 2 & 3 Special Wireless Sections
  - First Army Troops Workshop, Royal Canadian Electrical and Mechanical Engineers
  - No. 11 Provost Company, Canadian Provost Corps
  - No. 1 Canadian Forestry Group, Canadian Forestry Corps
  - No. 1 Army Base Post Office, Canadian Postal Corps
  - I Canadian Corps (April 1942 to November 1943; February to July 1945)
    - (attached to the British Eighth Army in Italy from November 1943 to February 1945)
    - 1st Canadian Infantry Division (in Italy from July 1943 to February 1945)
    - 5th Canadian Armoured Division
    - 1st Canadian Armoured Brigade
    - 1st Corps Defence Company (Lorne Scots)
    - Other Corps Troops
  - II Canadian Corps (January 15, 1943, to June 25, 1945)
    - 2nd Canadian Infantry Division
    - 3rd Canadian Infantry Division
    - 4th Canadian Armoured Division
    - 2nd Canadian Armoured Brigade
    - Polish 1st Armoured Division
    - 15th (Scottish) Infantry Division (January to March, 1945)
    - 2nd Corps Defence Company (The Prince Edward Island Light Horse)
    - Other Corps Troops
  - I British Corps (August 1, 1944, to April 1, 1945)
    - 6th Airborne Division (to 3 September 1944)
      - 1st Belgian Infantry Brigade (August 10 to September 10, 1944)
    - 49th (West Riding) Infantry Division
    - 51st (Highland) Infantry Division (to 19 December 1944)
    - 33rd Armoured Brigade (to September 1944)
    - 104th Infantry Division (United States) (mid October to early November, 1944)
  - XXX British Corps (January to March, 1945 for Operation Veritable)
    - Guards Armoured Division
    - 43rd (Wessex) Infantry Division
    - 52nd (Lowland) Infantry Division
    - 53rd (Welsh) Infantry Division
    - elements of 79th Armoured Division
    - 4th Armoured Brigade
    - 6th Guards Armoured Brigade
    - 8th Armoured Brigade
    - 34th Armoured Brigade

== Commanders ==
- Andrew McNaughton (Commander, early 1942 – 21 December 1943)
- Kenneth Stuart (Acting Commander, 21 December 1943 – 20 March 1944)
- Harry Crerar (Commander, 20 March 1944 – summer 1945)
- Guy Simonds (Acting Commander from 28 September to 7 November 1944)
