= 3rd Medium Regiment, Royal Canadian Artillery =

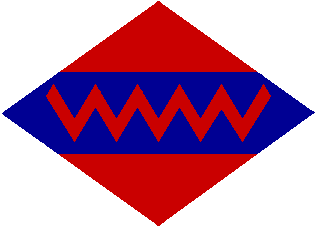
- Formation patch used by RCA units attached to the First Canadian Army
- Active: 26 January 1942 – 16 November 1945
- Disbanded: 16 November 1945
- Equipment: 5.5 and later 4.5-inch artillery gun

The 3rd Medium Regiment, Royal Canadian Artillery was raised as a medium artillery regiment of the Canadian Army on January 26, 1942. Formed in Petawawa, Ontario, it was made up of two former coastal batteries, the 5th, from the west coast, and the 87th, from the east coast.

== History ==
The regiment was equipped with the 5.5-inch medium gun or howitzer, later converting to the 4.5-inch Gun (Canadian Specification). In March 1942, the 3rd Medium was assigned to I Canadian Corps in England; in July 1944, the unit was transferred to II Canadian Corps for service in Northwest Europe. It was later assigned to the First Canadian Army level of command under 2 Army Group RCA (2nd AGRCA). The 3rd Medium Regiment, RCA, was disbanded on November 16, 1945.
