= 1st Medium Regiment, Royal Canadian Artillery =

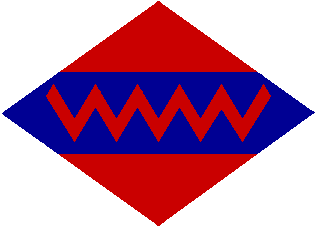
- Formation patch used by RCA troops attached to the First Canadian Army
- Active: ?–1945
- Country: Canada
- Branch: Canadian Army
- Role: Artillery
- Part of: No. 1 Army Group, RCA; First Canadian Army
- Engagements: World War II: Italian campaign; North-West Europe Campaign of 1944–1945

The 1st Medium Regiment, Royal Canadian Artillery was one of six Canadian medium artillery regiments that served in the European Theatre of World War II. Medium regiments were armed with 5.5-inch and 4.5-inch guns.

== History ==
The adjutant of the 1st Medium Regiment, RCA, was Captain Horace Trites; Trites was mentioned in dispatches in Italy. Trites and gun position officer (GPO) Lieutenant 'Buck' Buchanan later became pilots at 43 Operational Training Unit, RAF Andover, and fought in northwest Europe with No. 665 Squadron RCAF.

== Sources ==
- Fromow, Lt-Col. D.L. Canada's Flying Gunners. (Ottawa: Air Observation Post Pilot's Association, 2002). ISBN 0-9730055-0-5.
