= Edward Neufville Crosse =

British Brigadier, CBE, MC & Bar, MID, WW1 & WW2

Brigadier Edward Neufville Crosse CBE, MC and Bar
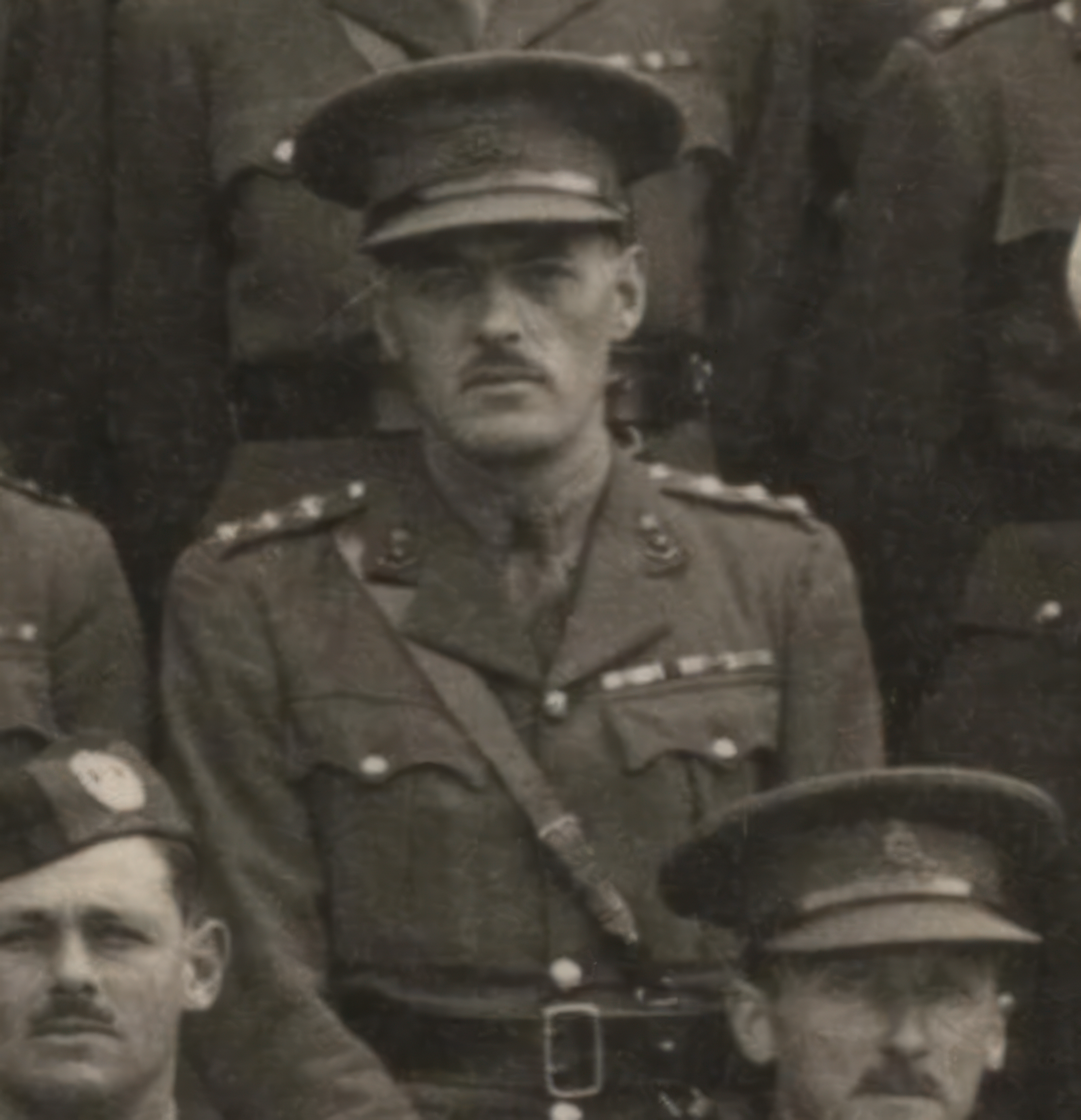
- The then Captain E.N. Crosse, MC and Bar, at Staff College, Camberley. 1931.
- Born: 19 January 1898; Canterbury, England
- Died: 9 October 1970 (aged 72); Yeovil, England
- Spouse(s): Edith Carol Harrison (m.1925; died 1927); Margaret Katharine Mackillop Brown (m.1929)
- Military career
- Allegiance: United Kingdom
- Branch: British Army
- Service years: 1915–1951
- Rank: Brigadier
- Service number: 10410
- Units: Royal Field Artillery; Royal Artillery
- Commands: 100th Anti-Aircraft Brigade (Apr 1943–Mar 1945); Commander, Royal Artillery, 49th (West Riding) Infantry Division (Mar–May 1945); Commander, Corps Royal Artillery, I Corps (Jun 1945–Mar 1948); Commander, Royal Artillery, 43rd (Wessex) Division (TA) (Mar 1948-Apr 1951)
- Conflicts: First World War; Iraq campaign of 1920; Second World War
- Awards: Commander of the Order of the British Empire (CBE); Military Cross and Bar; Mentioned in Despatches; Knight Commander of the Order of Orange-Nassau (with Swords)

Brigadier Edward Neufville Crosse, CBE, MC and Bar (19 January 1898 – 9 October 1970), was an officer in the British Army who served during the First World War, the Iraqi Revolt, and the Second World War.

Crosse served as a junior officer with the Royal Field Artillery on the Western Front during the First World War, and was mentioned in despatches and awarded the Military Cross. Crosse fought in the Battle of the Somme, during which two of his three brothers were killed and another wounded. He continued to serve in the interwar period and was awarded a Bar to his Military Cross for conspicuous gallantry in Iraq in 1920.

During the Second World War he moved between staff positions in the War Office and home-based regimental commands, until he was appointed commander of the 100th Anti-Aircraft Brigade in 1943. He led the brigade through the campaign in North West Europe, for which he was appointed Commander of the Order of the British Empire (CBE) in 1945. In March 1945, he became Commander, Royal Artillery, of the 49th (West Riding) Infantry Division for their final push to liberate the Netherlands, and after the surrender of German forces there he was tasked with overseeing the disarmament and internment of the 34th SS Volunteer Grenadier Division. For this service he was made a Knight Commander of the Order of Orange-Nassau (with Swords).

In June 1945 he was appointed Commander, Corps Royal Artillery, I Corps as part of the British Army of the Rhine, where he remained until March 1948. In November of that year he took his final posting as aide-de-camp to King George VI, a post he held until his retirement in May 1951.

== Early life ==
Crosse was born in Canterbury, Kent, in 1898, the youngest of eight children born to Thomas George Crosse, a clergyman born in India, and his wife Fanny Maria (née Simpson), who was born in Yorkshire. Fanny had previously been married to Charles James Nelson, who died in 1880. A daughter from that marriage, Charlotte Hallowell Nelson, was raised in the Crosse household and appears in census returns as Thomas Crosse's stepdaughter.

Crosse attended St Lawrence College, Ramsgate from 1911 to 1914, before enrolling in the Royal Military Academy, Woolwich between 1914 and 1915.

== First World War ==
All four Crosse brothers were commissioned into the British Army during the First World War, and served on the Western Front. Edward was commissioned into the Royal Field Artillery in 1915, joining 47th Brigade, Royal Field Artillery as part of the 14th (Light) Division in March 1916. His eldest brother, Thomas Latymer Crosse, was a captain in the Border Regiment, Robert Grant Crosse was a lieutenant in the Royal West Kent Regiment, and Edward’s youngest brother George Hallewell Crosse initially joined the Yorkshire Regiment, before transferring to 104th Company, Machine Gun Corps, in 1916.

The brothers all fought at the Battle of the Somme in 1916, an action which exacted a heavy toll on the family. Thomas was killed by machine gun fire in the fighting at Fricourt on 3 July, aged 27. Less than two weeks later on 14 July, and less than five miles away, Robert died of wounds sustained in shellfire at Trônes Wood, at the age of 22.

Map of the Battle of the Somme, 1916. Fricourt and Mountauban are both shown. The dotted line marked 14 July intersects Trônes Wood, east of Mountauban.

Edward had been in action in the Arras sector during this time but redeployed to Montauban-de-Picardie between 26 and 27 August so that the brigade’s artillery could cover Delville Wood, only a few miles from where both brothers had been killed. In a letter home to his sister Margaret, dated 26 August 1916, Edward wrote:

I am doing my best to find Tom’s and Rob’s graves; I have not been successful as yet, but I am going to the Register of Graves tomorrow to find out exactly where they are on the map and I suspect I will find them without difficulty. You see, the wood in which Tom is buried is pretty big and as far as I can make out, there is no special graveyard, but people were buried practically where they fell.

On the same day, less than two miles away, his youngest brother George was wounded in fighting in and around the Maltz Horn trenches, on the edge of Trônes Wood, where Robert had been fatally wounded less than two months prior. In another letter dated 29 September 1916, Edward wrote of George "rotten luck and yet good luck Hal being wounded, isn’t it? But fancy getting three solid weeks leave in Blighty, I do envy him."

George and Edward continued to serve on the Western Front. Edward was both mentioned in despatches in December 1917 and awarded the Military Cross less than a year later in June 1918. In March 1918, he was promoted to acting captain and posted to 47th Brigade Headquarters as adjutant, a position he held until the brigade’s disbanding in 1919.

== Iraq campaign ==
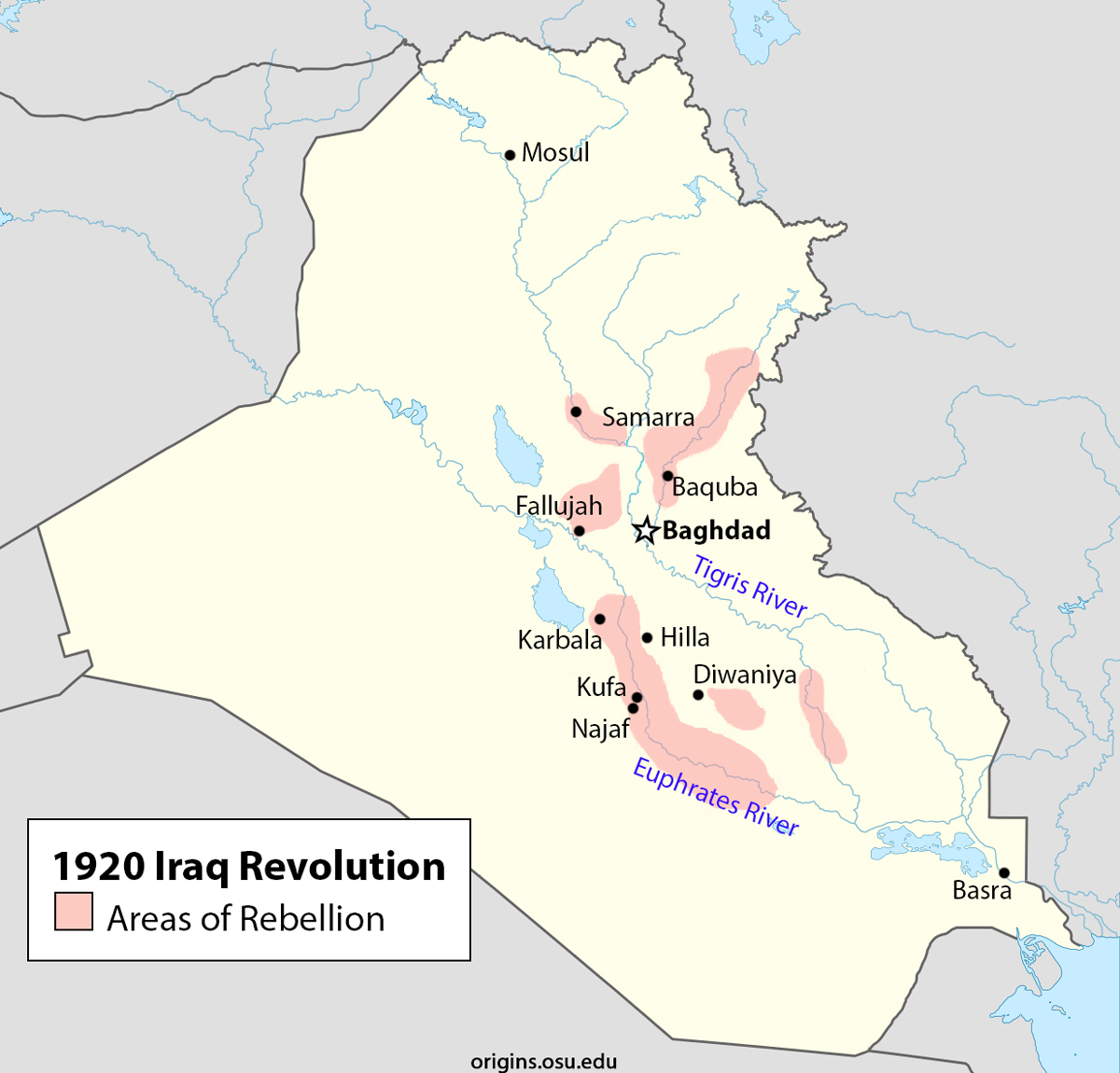
Iraq's 1920 Revolution. Hilla can be seen directly south of Baghdad. Crosse and the column were aiming to move to a Al-Kifl, halfway between Hilla and Kufa.

Edward and George both remained in the Army after the war and took part in British operations during the Iraq campaign of the early 1920s. Edward served with 39th Battery, 19th Brigade, Royal Field Artillery during the campaign, and fought in the action near Hillah (Hilla) in July 1920, during which a relief expedition, commonly known as ‘the Manchester Column’, was heavily attacked during a "night retreat which ended so disastrously [and] cost [the column] twenty killed, sixty wounded, and three hundred and eighteen missing".

Crosse wrote a detailed account to his parents on 25 July 1920, the day after the battle, in which he described the chaos of the withdrawal, including a stampede of mules and horses that resulted in 8 to 9 miles of his 14 mile retreat being done on foot after his horses were lost. He describes how his section became isolated as the rearguard against superior numbers and brought their guns into action at point blank range, before driving off attacking enemy forces with rifle fire. At least eight men from the battery were killed, but Crosse noted that “we can thank our lucky stars that we got out of it all with so few casualties.”

Lieutenant General Haldane, General Officer Commanding (GOC) Mesopotamia at the time, wrote in his account of the action that "the officers of the 39th Battery...behaved like heroes, and it is to their fine example and the discipline of those under their command that a complete disaster was averted." Several gallantry awards were issued after the action, including a Victoria Cross for Captain George Henderson. Crosse received a Bar to his Military Cross for his actions that night, his citation reading:

For conspicuous gallantry in action on the night of the 24th/25th July 1920, near the Rustimiyeh Canal. During a rearguard action at night, when the infantry and cavalry were cut off from the rest of the column by Arabs, he repeatedly brought his section into action and drove off the enemy, who were attacking in superior numbers. When five of his men were wounded he acted as one of the detachment, and thus enabled the gun to remain in action. Throughout the operations he showed the greatest courage.

A second letter to his parents dated 31 July 1920 describes in detail the siege of Hillah that followed, with British forces surrounded on three sides and in frequent action against attacking forces, waiting for relief forces to arrive from the south.

== Second World War ==
=== Interwar career and staff service ===
Crosse remained in the army throughout the interwar period. After promotion to captain in 1927, with seniority from 1924, he attended the Staff College, Camberley, in 1931. Other overseas postings followed, including to India, and he was promoted to major in 1936.

In October 1938, Crosse was appointed to the Adjutant-General's Branch as a Deputy Assistant Adjutant-General, a post he held at the outbreak of war. In August 1940, Crosse left the War Office and returned to field command with the 46th Light Anti-Aircraft Regiment, during which time he was promoted to Lieutenant Colonel.

Crosse returned to the War Office in February 1941 for an 18-month posting as Deputy Director of Organisation within the Adjutant General's Branch, during which time he was made an acting Brigadier. He relinquished this rank in August 1942 when he took command of 20th Anti-Tank Regiment, followed by 187th Field Regiment in December that year.

In April 1943, Crosse was appointed to command the newly formed 100th Anti-Aircraft Brigade, with the rank of temporary brigadier. The brigade served throughout the campaign in North West Europe as one of two anti-aircraft brigades operating in direct support of British Second Army operations, not only in an anti-aircraft role, but also as ground, bridge, river and anti-tank defence. Crosse's leadership of the 100th Anti-Aircraft Brigade resulted in his recommendation for a CBE in October 1944.

=== Operation Crosseforce ===
The recommendation for the award cited two specific operations. The first, "Operation Crosseforce", took place in early September 1944. The divergence of the advances of British XXX Corps and US XIX Corps exposed XXX Corps' right flank and lines of communication to German counterattack, based on intelligence reports indicating a large German armoured concentration believed at the time to comprise elements of II SS Panzer Corps. Under Crosse's command, the brigade expanded to include the 86th Field Regiment, Royal Artillery, 73rd Anti-Tank Regiment, the Royal Netherlands Brigade, one troop of the 13th/18th Royal Hussars and a company of the King's Royal Rifle Corps, forming a composite force for anti-tank and ground defence.

Crosse was said to have "organised this force rapidly and effectively and for a period of 10 days contributed largely to the security of the communications of the 30th Corps." At its peak, the formation comprised 20 sub-units and 9,195 personnel. The operation concluded on 15 September.

=== Operation Market Garden ===
The recommendation then turned to the brigade's role during and immediately after Operation Market Garden. 100th Anti-Aircraft Brigade's initial orders in the operation were to provide anti-aircraft cover for the advance of XXX Corps and the bridges over the River Waal once captured, including those at Arnhem and Nijmegen, as well as provide anti-motor torpedo boat defence for the bridges at Nijmegen. In the event, Crosse and the brigade were instead tasked with air, ground and river defence of the Grave bridge over the River Maas, bridges over the Maas-Waal canal, and the road, rail and pontoon bridges over the River Waal at Nijmegen. From Crosse's CBE recommendation:

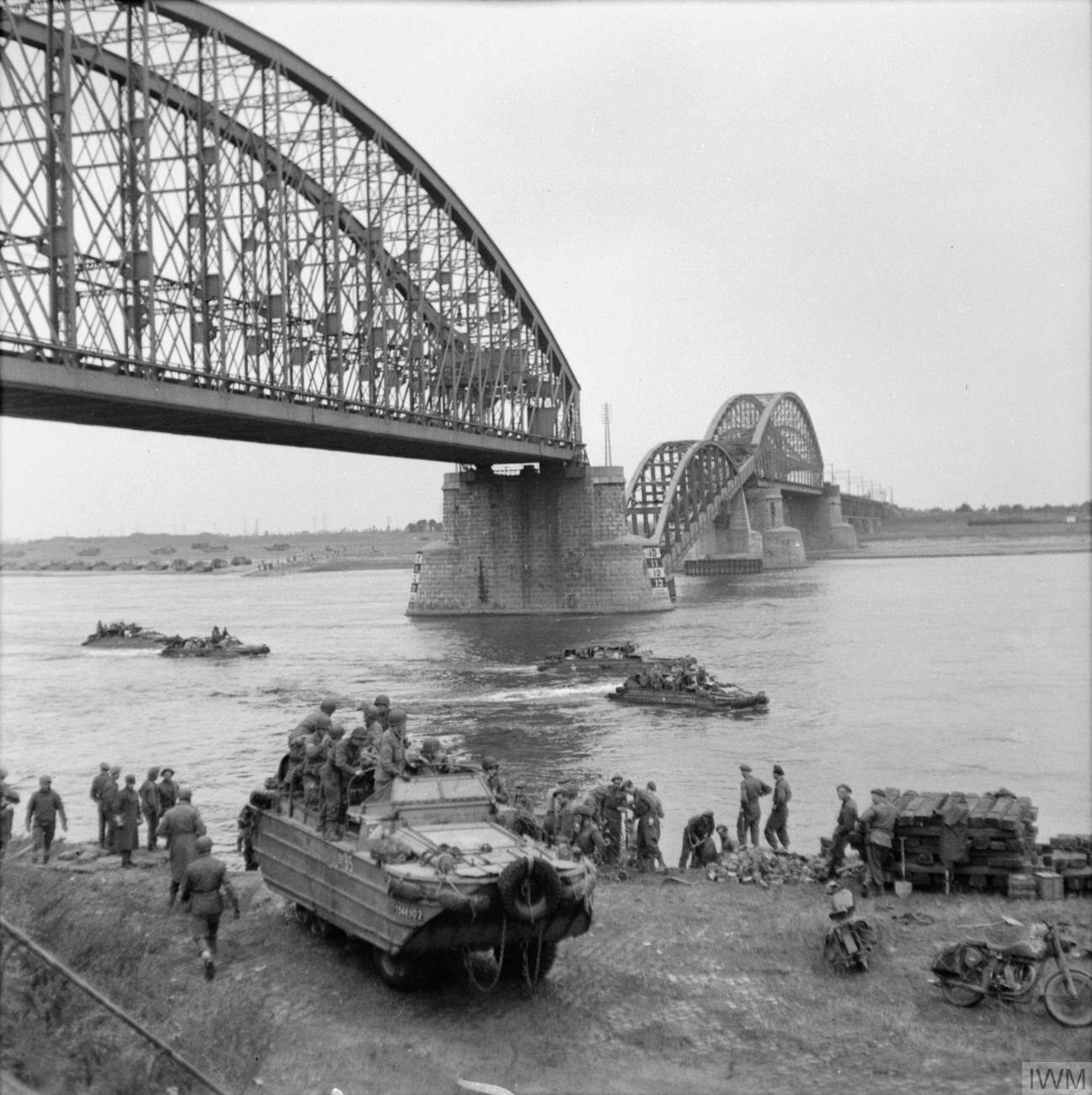
Damaged railway bridge at Nijmegen, following the "partially successful" attack by frogmen. September 1944.

From September 21st the security of the crossings over the River Waal became a commitment of the first importance, and it was evident that the enemy's prime object was to capture or destroy the bridges at Nijmegen. After the enemy's partially successful attack on the 29th September Brigadier Crosse was again given a mixed force and was charged with the close defence of the bridges against air, ground and river-borne attack. He has carried out these duties with marked success.

For a period of two months, starting with advance parties on 21 September, the brigade defended the bridges against repeated air attack, including from Me 262s, attacks from mines floated down the river, and attacks by frogmen, and it also provided smokescreens and fire support for units moving through the area. The brigade was relieved by 74th Anti-Aircraft Brigade in mid-November.

=== Final operations in 1945 ===
Crosse was then appointed Commander, Royal Artillery, of 49th Infantry Division in March 1945. His actions in this posting earned him the honour of Knight Commander of the Order of Oranje-Nassau with Swords, for which he was recommended in August 1945 and gazetted in May 1947. In late March 1945, 49th Division received orders to begin clearing "The Island", an area of the Netherlands which had been left in German hands after the failure of Operation Market Garden. This was completed in early April with relatively light casualties, and 49th Division's actions culminated in the Liberation of Arnhem. According to Crosse's nomination for his Order of Oranje-Nassau award:

The successes enjoyed by the [Division] during this period were largely due to the scale of fire power provided in each operation. [Brigadier] Crosse was mainly responsible for implementing fire plans and he carried out his duties most successfully.

Crosse briefly served as acting GOC of the division from 18 to 27 April 1945 in the absence of Major-General Stuart Rawlins, who had attended Staff College at the same time as Crosse in 1931.

== Post-war ==
Following the surrender of German forces in the Netherlands on 4 May 1945, Crosse was appointed to oversee the disarmament and internment of the 34th SS Volunteer Grenadier Division "Landstorm Nederland". For this task, his papers show that he was given 2nd Battalion, Kensington Regiment, together with a battalion of infantry formed from various 49th Division Royal Artillery regiments under his command.

In his report on the operation, Crosse described tensions on multiple levels. Dutch resistance sought to take an active role in dealing with surrendered SS personnel, and Crosse recorded that isolated incidents of violence occurred between resistance members and SS troops during this period, resulting in casualties. SS-Oberführer Martin Kohlroser, German commander of the division, protested against the planned public disarming of the division, which Crosse considered necessary to reassure and placate the Dutch populace, and objected to SS officers being unable to keep their sidearms, unlike their Wehrmacht counterparts. Crosse's response was firm. He notes that he shared a copy of the Illustrated London News of 28 April 1945, which published photographs and detailed reports of SS atrocities during the Holocaust, including graphic imagery, as explanation of the difference in treatment between SS and Wehrmacht. Kohlroser withdrew his protest.

By the end of the operation, nearly 6,000 officers and men had been disarmed and interned, along with substantial quantities of horses, carts and equipment; Crosse later characterised the task as a "difficult and almost unprecedented combined operation", but ultimately completed without serious breakdown of order. His Order of Oranje-Nassau award noted that:

He was sympathetic but firm in dealing with the Dutch resistance authorities and before leaving Northern Holland his work was applauded by at least 12 burgomasters in this area who expressed their warm appreciation of his firm attitude towards the capitulated German troops and his generous understanding of the Dutch people.

In June 1945, Crosse was appointed Commander, Corps Royal Artillery (CCRA), I Corps as part of the British Army on the Rhine, a post he held until March 1948 when he returned to the UK. Here he took his final command as Commander, Royal Artillery, 43rd (Wessex) Infantry Division.

On 3 November that year, Crosse was appointed Aide-de-Camp to King George VI, and was permanently promoted to brigadier on 20 December. He would hold this post until his retirement in May 1951.

== Personal life ==
Crosse married Edith Carol Harrison in January 1925; she died in October 1927. In October 1929 he married Margaret Katharine Mackillop Brown, who survived him. Crosse died in Yeovil in October 1970, aged 72.

== Bibliography ==
- Haldane, Aylmer L. (1922). The Insurrection in Mesopotamia, 1920. Edinburgh and London: W. Blackwood and Sons. OCLC 4566468.
- Michaelis, Rolf (2015). Grenadier Divisions of the Waffen-SS (Kindle ed.). Schiffer Military History. ISBN 978-1-50-730482-2.
- Routledge, N. W. (1994). Anti-Aircraft Artillery 1914–55. History of the Royal Regiment of Artillery. London: Brassey's. ISBN 978-1-85-753099-5.
