= Stuart Rawlins =

Stuart Rawlins may refer to:

- Stuart Rawlins (British Army colonel) (1880–1927)
- Stuart Blundell Rawlins (1897–1955), British Army major general
