= 90th Heavy Anti-Aircraft Regiment, Royal Artillery =

90th Heavy Anti-Aircraft Regiment, RA 490th (Southgate) Heavy Anti-Aircraft Regiment, RA
- Cap Badge of the Royal Artillery (pre-1953)
- Active: 1 April 1939–10 March 1955
- Country: United Kingdom
- Branch: Territorial Army
- Role: Air defence
- Size: Regiment
- Part of: 37 AA Bde; 28 (Thames & Medway) AA Bde; 100 AA Bde; 63 (North London) AA Bde
- Garrison/HQ: Southgate, London
- Engagements: Battle of Britain; The Blitz; Operation Overlord; Defence of Nijmegen bridges Operation Bodenplatte; Operation Blackcock; Operation Veritable; Rhine Crossing

The 90th Heavy Anti-Aircraft Regiment, Royal Artillery was an air defence regiment of Britain's Territorial Army (TA) formed in the London suburbs of Middlesex during the period of international tension leading up to the outbreak of World War II. It defended London during the Battle of Britain and the Blitz of 1940–41 and later served in the campaign in North West Europe. The unit continued in the postwar Territorial Army until it was disbanded in 1955.

== Origin ==
In 1935, the increasing need for anti-aircraft (AA) defence, particularly for London, was addressed by converting a number of London infantry battalions of the Territorial Army (TA) to the AA role. One of these was the 11th London Regiment (Finsbury Rifles), which was transferred to the Royal Artillery (RA) as the 61st (Finsbury Rifles) Anti-Aircraft Brigade. By 1938, the brigade comprised one light AA (LAA) and three heavy AA (HAA) batteries at Finchley and Pentonville. The TA was rapidly expanded after the Munich Crisis and, in October 1938, the brigade ('regiment' from 1 January 1939) formed an additional heavy battery (272nd AA Bty) at Southgate. In early 1939, the TA was doubled in size, and, on 1 April 1939, the 272nd Battery left to form the basis of a new 90th Anti-Aircraft Regiment, RA, with its Regimental Headquarters (RHQ), 272nd, 284th, and 285th AA Batteries all at Southgate, Middlesex. It was under the command of Brevet Colonel H.A.D. Murray, TD.

Initially, the new regiment formed part of the 37th AA Brigade. By the outbreak of World War II, this was under the 6th AA Division of AA Command which was defending the approaches to London.

== World War II ==
=== Mobilisation ===
6 AA Division's formation sign

In June 1939, as the international situation worsened, a partial mobilisation of the TA was begun in a process known as 'couverture', whereby each AA unit did a month's tour of duty in rotation to man selected AA gun positions. Full mobilisation of AA Command came in August 1939, ahead of the declaration of war on 3 September 1939. 37 AA Brigade deployed and operated a gun layout from Dagenham to Thorpe Bay in Essex, along the north side of the Thames Estuary, known as 'Thames North'. This had a planned layout of 20 HAA sites, however only half were occupied by September 1940.

Opportunities for action were rare during the Phoney War, but on the night of 22/23 November 1939 the HAA guns of Thames North combined with those of 28th (Thames & Medway) AA Bde on the other bank of the estuary ('Thames South') to engage at least two enemy mine-laying aircraft that had strayed into the mouth of the Estuary. One wrecked aircraft was found on the marshes.

On 1 June 1940, all RA units equipped with the older 3-inch or newer 3.7-inch AA guns were designated as Heavy AA (HAA) regiments to distinguish them from the newer Light AA (LAA) regiments appearing in the order of battle.

=== Battle of Britain ===
All the guns of Thames North were heavily engaged throughout the Battle of Britain. On 22 August, for example, a mass raid flew up the Thames Estuary to attack RAF Hornchurch on the Essex shore; the raid was broken up by 37 and 28 AA Bdes, and then the fighters of No. 11 Group RAF attacked. Follow-up raids were marked for the fighters by 'pointer' rounds of HAA fire. On 2 September, another mass raid arrived over the Medway and flew up the Thames towards Hornchurch. They came under heavy fire from the 3.7s and 4.5s of 28 and 37 AA Bdes and 15 were shot down before the fighters took over. On 7 September, heavy raids up the estuary attacked oil wharves at Thameshaven, Tilbury Docks and Woolwich Arsenal: a total of 25 aircraft were destroyed by AA guns and fighters.

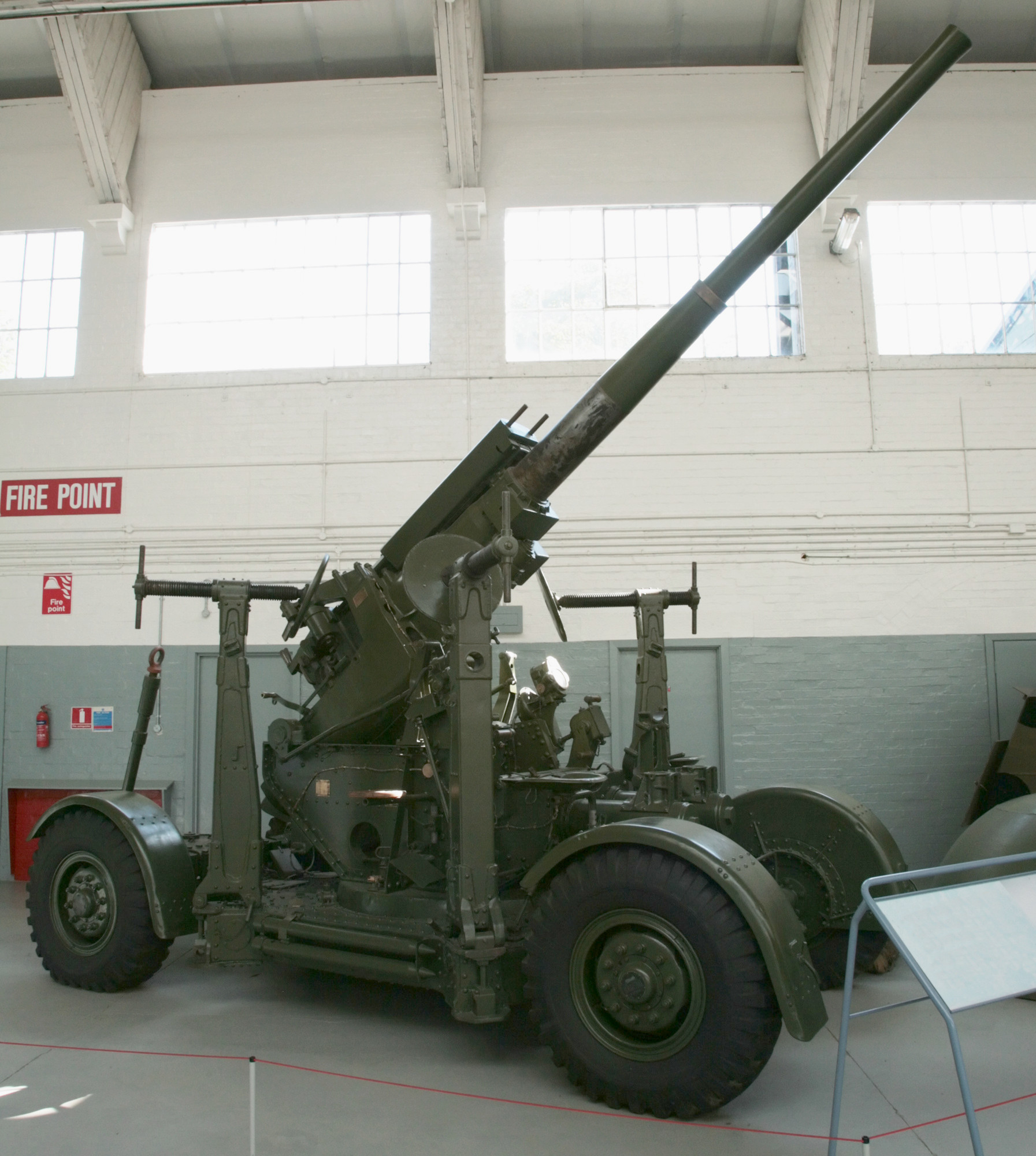
Mobile 3.7-inch HAA gun preserved at Imperial War Museum Duxford.

On 15 September, remembered as the climax of the battle, 220 bombers attacked London in the morning despite heavy casualties inflicted by the RAF fighters. More attacks came in the afternoon and the AA guns around London, particularly 37 AA Bde, were continuously in action, breaking up the bomber formations. Between the guns and fighters, the Luftwaffe lost 85 aircraft that day, an unsustainable rate of loss.

=== The Blitz ===
After 15 September, the intensity of Luftwaffe day raids declined rapidly, and it began a prolonged night bombing campaign over London and industrial towns (The Blitz). This meant that the Thames North and South AA guns were in action night after night as the bomber streams approached the London Inner Artillery Zone, but even with the assistance of searchlights, the effectiveness of HAA fire and fighters was greatly diminished in the darkness.

By November, 90th HAA Rgt had been transferred across the estuary to reinforce 28 AA Bde in Thames South. This had a planned layout of 25 HAA sites (of which only 16 were occupied) running from Dartford to Chatham, Kent, where there was a strongly defended area around the naval dockyards at Chatham and Sheerness and the aircraft factory at Rochester. This was controlled from a Gun Operations Room (GOR) at Chatham. As well as bomber streams passing over towards the London Inner Artillery Zone (IAZ), the Chatham area was also subjected to minor attacks.

=== Mid-war ===
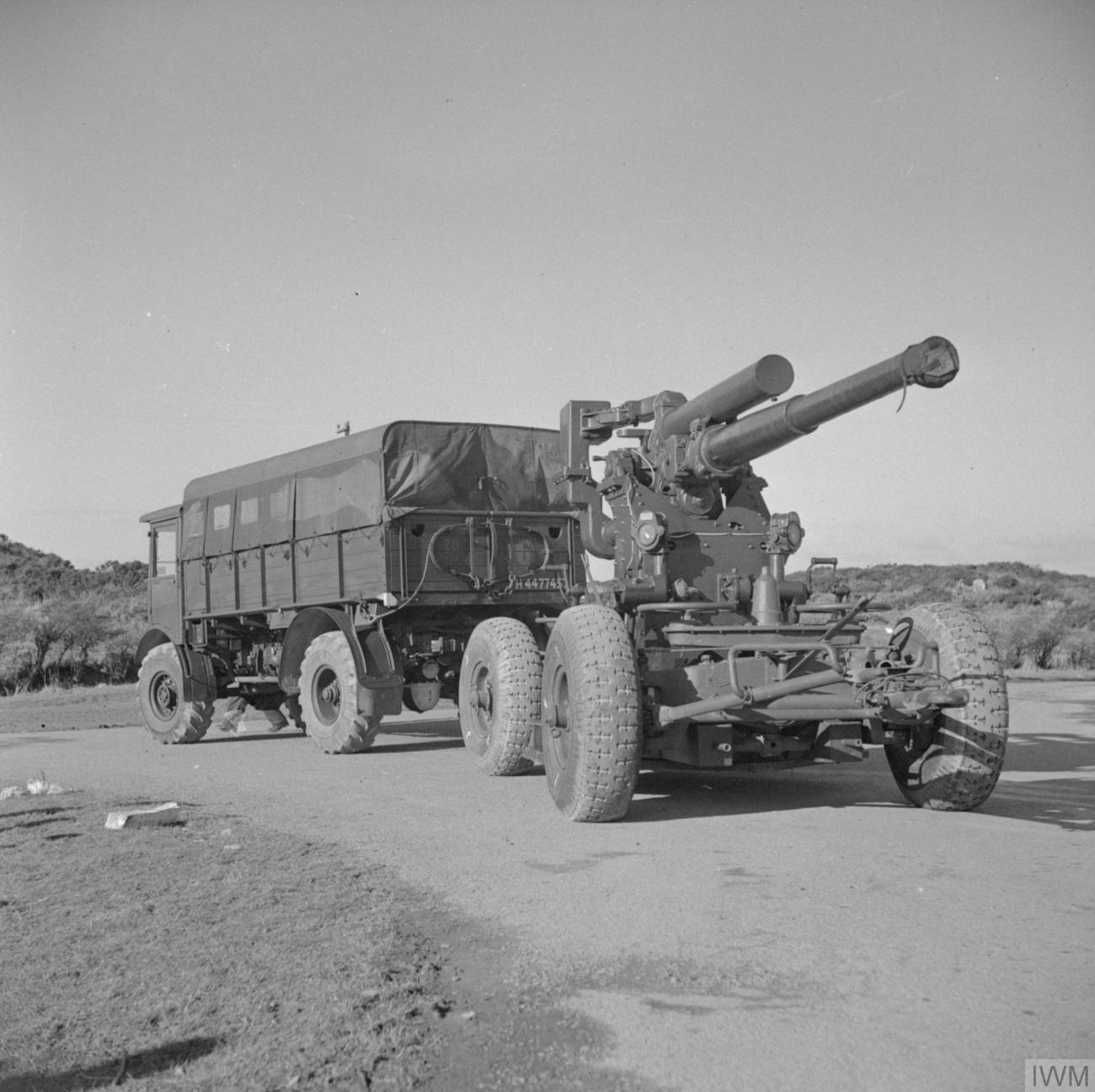
AEC Matador artillery tractor towing a 3.7-inch HAA gun on exercise at Burrow Head in Scotland, 18 February 1944.

The Blitz ended in May 1941 but 90th HAA Rgt remained in 28 AA Bde for the next year. It had sent a cadre to 205th HAA Training Regiment at Arborfield to provide the basis for a new 394 Bty; this was formed on 12 December 1940 and joined the regiment on 17 March 1941 The regiment sent another cadre to 206th HAA Training Regiment at Arborfield to form 445 HAA Bty on 12 June 1941; this later joined 129th HAA Rgt. A further cadre went to 211th HAA Training Regiment at Oswestry to form 494 (Mixed) HAA Bty on 26 November 1941, which joined 143rd (Mixed) HAA Rgt. ('Mixed' units were those into which women of the Auxiliary Territorial Service were integrated.) A final cadre went to 205th HAA Training Rgt to form 535 (M) HAA Rgt on 19 February 1942, which joined 156th (M) HAA Rgt.

From 1942, many of AA Command's experienced units were transferred to War Office (WO) control, trained and equipped for mobile warfare in active theatres overseas. 90th HAA Regiment was one of those selected and converted to the three-battery establishment for overseas service; 394 HAA Battery left on 10 July 1942, transferring to a newly formed 164th HAA Rgt. 90th HAA Regiment then left 28 AA Bde later that month. In the autumn it joined 71 AA Bde in 2 AA Group (a new formation that had taken over from 6 AA Division), but left AA Command entirely in early 1943 to come under WO Control in March, with the following organisation:

- RHQ
- 272, 284, 285 HAA Btys
- 90 HAA Signal Detachment, Royal Corps of Signals
- 90 HAA Workshop, Royal Electrical and Mechanical Engineers

By July, 90th HAA was designated as a mobile regiment in 21st Army Group, training for the planned Allied invasion of Normandy (Operation Overlord).

=== North West Europe ===
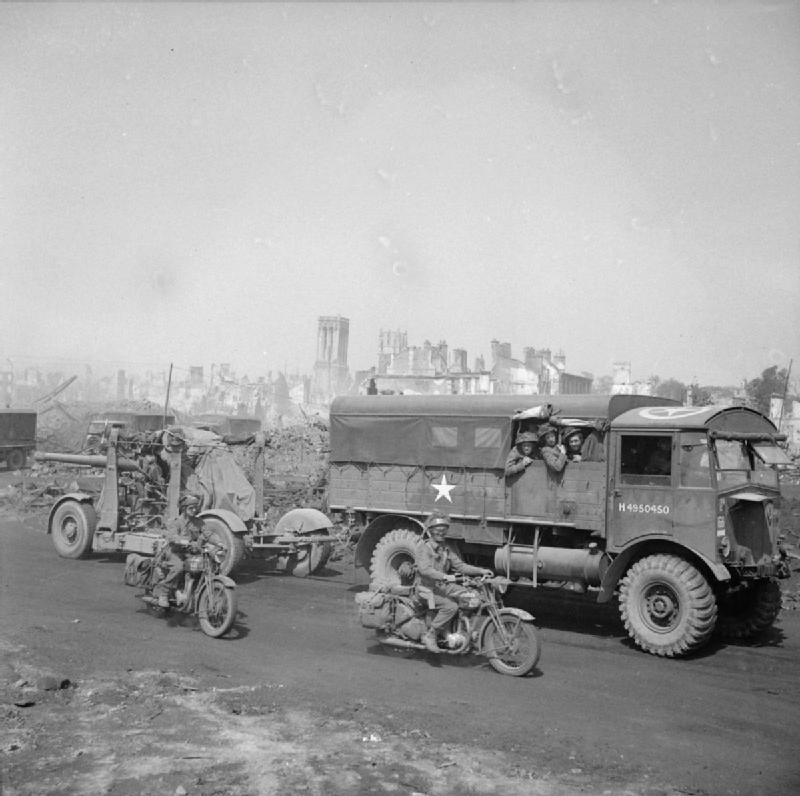
A Matador tows a 3.7-inch HAA gun through the ruins of Caen, August 1944.

Operation Overlord began with D Day on 6 June 1994, but in late June the regiment was still in England with 100 AA Bde, waiting to be called for embarkation. As 100 AA Bde's units arrived in Normandy, they were at first placed under the command of 80 AA Bde, tasked with defending the eastern end of the beachhead. However, by July, the Luftwaffe was reduced to sporadic raids, and the HAA regiments, including 90th HAA, were frequently used to supplement the medium artillery in bombarding ground targets, counter-battery (CB) fire, and anti-tank roles in the bitter fighting round Caen. Once the city was captured, responsibility for its AA defence was handed over to 100 AA Bde. After 21st Army Group began to advance out of the beachhead in August, 100 AA Bde was able to pass responsibility for Caen over to 75 AA Bde and catch up with the advance.

On 25 August, 100 AA Bde was protecting the Seine crossings with 272 Bty of 90th HAA Rgt together with an LAA regiment, and by 4 September it was covering XXX Corps' supply lines running from Arras to Antwerp with the whole of 90th HAA Rgt deployed, though the regimental transport vehicles had been taken to supply the advancing troops. XXX Corps made a further thrust in Operation Market Garden, and 90th HAA Rgt was deployed to defend the crossings of the Albert and Meuse–Escaut canals behind the start line. After the failure of Market Garden, 100 AA Bde's tasks were extended to include the captured bridges up to Nijmegen and 90 HAA Rgt was brought up on 1 October (minus its Radar Troop, which was deployed elsewhere with LAA guns). 74 AA Brigade HQ took over responsibility for Nijmengen on 10 November, but 90th HAA Rgt remained in position.

Protecting Nijmegen Bridge was the first 'proper' AA task the regiment had been given so far in the campaign: the guns were in action every night and occasionally during the day. 272 and 284 HAA Batteries also fired in the ground role in support of 43rd (Wessex) Infantry Division; 285 HAA Bty was precluded for this because its eight-gun AA battery position was under direct enemy observation. After six weeks the regiment moved south and deployed to provide AA defence for the communication centre of Helmond, back under the command of 100 AA Bde.

Little was seen of the Luftwaffe in December 1944 and, towards the end of the month, 284 HAA Bty was lent to 8th Army Group Royal Artillery (AGRA) supporting VIII Corps. It was deployed at Overloon and Boxmeer on the River Maas in the ground role, primarily CB tasks. However, the regiment was busy in the AA role on 1 January 1945 when the Luftwaffe launched Operation Bodenplatte to support the Ardennes Offensive. Hundreds of aircraft attacked Allied airfields. Most were fast-moving single-engined Fighter-bombers, which were not good HAA targets, but two were brought down by the regiment's Bren guns, one by 284 HAA Bty deployed in its medium artillery role, the other by 285 HAA Bty.

From 10 January, the regiment was wholly employed in the ground role at Grathem, west of Roermond. On 16 January, XII Corps launched Operation Blackcock to eliminate a German pocket on the east bank of the Maas. Over the next 10 days, the regiment fired no less than 15,000 rounds in support. The weather was so cold that the ammunition boxes received from supply points were completely frozen and the rounds had to be prised free and unwrapped individually. During Operation Veritable in February, the regiment remained at Grathem under 100 AA Bde, supporting VIII Corps and Ninth US Army.

=== Rhine crossing ===
On 1 March, 90th HAA Rgt came out of the line and moved to Nieuwpoort, Belgium on the coast. 100 AA Brigade was being freed of commitments in order to support XII Corps in the assault crossing of the Rhine (Operation Plunder). The forward dumps, artillery positions and marshalling areas for this operation were enormous, and the AA brigades had to extend their cover from front to rear in considerable depth. The flat country also favoured the flat trajectory of the 3.7-inch HAA gun in the medium artillery role, and 90th HAA Rgt was lent to 9th AGRA for CB tasks. In the last 48 hours before D-day, 90th HAA Rgt moved up into concealed positions and sent its transport to the rear, having dumped 9,600 rounds (400 per gun) at the gun pits. During the night of 23/24 March, the regiment fired 4575 rounds in a seven-hour programme as the assault crossing was made. The following morning it took part in the 30-minute anti-flak bombardment (codenamed 'Carpet') before the airborne element of the crossing (Operation Varsity) went in. Each battery of the regiment had been allocated one target for continuous bombardment at slow rate (2 rounds per gun per minute). 'Carpet' then stopped to allow the stream of aircraft carrying paratroopers and towing gliders to fly in. The bombardment had not succeeded in suppressing all the Flak positions, and casualties from AA fire among the aircraft were heavy. Nevertheless, almost all the airborne objectives were successfully taken.

XII Corps released 90th HAA Rgt from its AGRA tasks at 05.30 on 25 March: 272 HAA Bty then moved up into position on the west bank, while the other two batteries were held in readiness, and crossed the river that evening. These batteries deployed at once into eight-gun positions alongside LAA batteries to provide AA cover as the Luftwaffe attempted to disrupt the bridging operations. The regiment engaged 14 enemy aircraft that night, of which nine adopted evasive action on their run-in. What appeared to be radar jamming turned out to be the sheer volume of AA and other shells visible on the screens. On the following night, the regiment engaged 17 aircraft and brought its total of 'kills' up to six. By 28 March, the bridges were all complete and 21st Army Group was beginning its drive across Germany. 90th HAA Regiment settled down with 100 AA Bde to defend XII Corps' bridges at Xanten in a full-scale IAZ with HAA, LAA, searchlights and radar. Apart from some slight daytime activity by fighter-bombers, the Luftwaffe now ceased operations along the Rhine.

The AA tasks having disappeared, the AA brigades were put to other uses. 90th HAA Regiment was 'grounded' and its vehicles used for general transport for the advancing armies, while the gunners secured Prisoners of War and captured material, removed roadblocks and carried out battlefield clearance. These tasks continued after the German surrender at Lüneburg Heath as part of the occupation forces in Germany while awaiting demobilisation. 90th HAA Regiment was placed in suspended animation in British Army of the Rhine on 1 March 1946.

== Postwar ==
When the TA was reconstituted on 1 January 1947, the regiment was reformed at Southgate, initially as 490 (Mixed) Heavy AA Regiment (Middlesex) ('Mixed' now indicated that members of the Women's Royal Army Corps were integrated into the unit), but shortly afterwards the subtitle 'Middlesex' was changed to 'Southgate'. It formed part of 63 (North London) AA Brigade (the former 37 AA Bde).

AA Command was disbanded on 10 March 1955 and 490 HAA Regiment was placed in suspended animation on the same day; it was disbanded on 15 July that year.
