= Girlguiding South West England =

Girlguiding South West England is one of the nine Countries and Regions of Girlguiding UK. It is further subdivided into 16 Girlguiding Counties and Islands. These are generally not the same as the counties defined by the British government, and in this Region, two of the Islands, Guernsey and Jersey, are not even part of the United Kingdom.

The regional Headquarters is St Ann's Manor in Salisbury, Wiltshire.

== Counties ==
Girlguiding South West England is subdivided into 16 Counties and Islands. These are:

- Berkshire
- Bristol & South Gloucestershire
- Cornwall
- Devon
- Dorset
- Gloucestershire
- Guernsey
- Hampshire East
- Hampshire North
- Hampshire West
- Isle of Wight
- Jersey
- Somerset
- Somerset North
- Wiltshire North
- Wiltshire South

== History ==
A letter survives from 1908, addressed to Lord Baden-Powell from May Jones in Brislington, asking him whether she can start a Girl Scout patrol. The encouraging reply is also extant. A year later the Brislington Girl Scout Owl Patrol was formed.

Guiding started on the Island of Jersey in 1919 with the formation of three Companies and its history is extensively documented.

Guiding in Plymouth was started by Lady Nancy Astor in 1917. She was "perturbed at the fact that several flourishing Guide units existed in Exeter and other parts of the County while Plymouth had none." She called a meeting of prominent people, especially those already involved in girls' organisations. Astor was appointed Divisional Commissioner and Mrs Palliser Hickman (the garrison commander's wife) was elected chairwoman of the local association. By July 1917 over 4000 girls had signed up.

=== Channel Islands in World War II ===
The Channel Islands were occupied by Germany between 1941 and 1945. Official meetings were banned, but Guiding continued under cover. On Jersey, three Companies, the 5th St. Marks, 10th St. Aubin and 12th Gorey continued to meet at the homes of their Guiders. Miss Grace Le Roux, Captain of the 5th St Mark's Girl Guides received the Gilt Cross for her work for Guiding during the occupation.

== Camp sites ==
Foxlease, the national Girlguiding UK training and activity centre near Lyndhurst, Hampshire, is in this region.

== Centenary ==
Both Jersey and Guernsey issued postage stamps honouring the Guides' centenary in 2010.

== Bath and District Gang Show ==
The Bath and District Gang Show was started in 1997, and generally has a cast of about 60 Scouts and Guides. Cast only have to audition for solos, duets and sketches and any member of the Scouts or Guides prepared to give the required commitment to the show can take part. The show takes place each year at the Kingswood School Theatre, in Lansdown, Bath. In 2004, the Gang Show were awarded the Gang Show Emblem. In 2008 the show was awarded the NODA's Stage Electric's award for technical achievement. In November 2009 they performed at the Bath Male Choir concert at the Bath Forum. In December 2008 and 2009, they staged 'A Christmas Carol' and 'The Lion, the Witch and the Wardrobe' at the Rondo Theatre, Bath. Members of the team also production manage events at various international jamborees. 2012 marks their 15th anniversary and plans are in place to stage a celebration production from 6 - 10 June to make these celebrations as well as a Christmas show at the Rondo in December 2012. 2013 marked the last production which was aimed at training up a new young production team.

== See also ==
- Scouting in South West England
- Scouting in South East England
- Scouting in Jersey
- Scouting in Guernsey
