= Scouting in Jersey =

Scouting in Jersey is a part of the Scout Association in the United Kingdom, covering Jersey in the Channel Islands. The Island Commissioner is Glen Militis who assumed the role in April 2018. There are no separate Districts.

The Jersey Scout Association has over 800 members supported by about 30 Young Leaders and a further 120 adult volunteers, covering the whole Island. There are 7 Groups across the Island, this is further supplemented by 5 Island units. All the Groups hold regular meetings for Beaver, Cubs and Scout sections.

The Jersey Scout Association has four Explorer units, a Scout Band, and a Climbing Club.

Interesting fact: During the German occupation in World War II, Scouting was banned, but continued undercover.

== Campsites ==
The Jersey Scout Centre has bunk-bed accommodation for 40 people, a camp site and the HQ of the Jersey Scout Association. It is located in the parish of St. Ouen, at the north end of La Grand Route Des Mielles.

== See also ==
- Girlguiding South West England
