= 34th SS Volunteer Grenadier Division Landstorm Nederland =

German infantry division

34th SS Volunteer Division "Landstorm Nederland"
- 34. SS-Freiwilligen-Grenadier-Division "Landstorm Nederland"
- Unit insignia
- Active: 11 March 1943 – 4 May 1945
- Country: Germany
- Allegiance: NSB
- Branch: Waffen-SS
- Type: Infantry
- Size: 6,000 (1945)
- Engagements: World War II: Operation Market Garden; Battle of Groningen

Commanders
- Notable commanders: Martin Kohlroser

The 34th SS Volunteer Grenadier Division "Landstorm Nederland" (German: 34. SS-Freiwilligen-Grenadier-Division "Landstorm Nederland") was an infantry division of the Waffen-SS. The unit consisted mainly of Dutch volunteers and was active exclusively on the Western Front from its formation in March 1943, to its surrender and disarming in May 1945. Despite its name, the ‘division’ only ever reached the size of a brigade, consisting of 6,000 men and officers at its surrender in 1945.

== Origins ==
By early 1943, Dutch resistance activities had become effective and widespread enough that Reichskommissar of the Netherlands Artur Seyss-Inquart demanded reinforcements to help defend German military installations. Many thousands of Dutch volunteers had already joined 4th SS Panzer Grenadier Brigade Netherlands and 5th SS Panzer Division Wiking, and expanding the size of units within those formations was rejected. However, Himmler approved the formation of a Dutch hilfpolizeitruppe, or auxiliary police troop.

This unit, Landwacht Niederlande, was formed on 11 March 1943. It unlocked a new pool of Dutch manpower by guaranteeing that volunteers would only serve in the defence of the Netherlands itself, making it a more attractive prospect than volunteering for the existing Dutch SS units that were serving on the eastern front. It also loosened both fitness and age requirements.

The unit gained its official designation as a part of the Waffen-SS on 16 October 1943, when three battalions were transferred into it, bringing it up to regimental strength. It gained the name SS-Grenadier-Regiment I “Landstorm Nederland", to emphasise its military character. The unit continued to grow over the following year, reaching a strength of nearly 3,200 personnel by June 1944.

On 2 November 1944, the regiment became SS-Freiwilligen-Grenadier-Brigade “Landstorm Nederland”, or niederlandische Nr.2 to differentiate it from the Volunteer Legion. More men were mobilised, taking its strength to around 5,400. Its final change, to 34 SS-Freiwilligen-Grenadier-Division “Landstorm Nederland” took place in February of 1945. The unit never reached the size of a division, and barely reached that of a brigade.

== Operational history ==
The division's forerunner regiment, SS Grenadier Regiment Landstorm Nederland, first saw action during Operation Market Garden. In September 1944, the unit came under the command of Hans Rauter in the newly formed Kampfgruppen Rauter along with the Wachbataillon Nordwest and a regiment of the Ordnungspolizei. 1st and 2nd battalions were deployed in defensive positions early on, but 3rd battalion was still in training. It was deployed to Arnhem, and quickly attached to the 9th SS Panzer Division when they arrived at Arnhem on 20 September 1944.

Now officially a division and under the command of SS-Oberführer Martin Kohlroser, the division fought in the Netherlands during the final months of the war in 1945, attempting to stop the advance of 49th (West Riding) Infantry Division, which had turned away from the allied advance into Germany to finally liberate the remainder of the Netherlands. The 34th SS Division surrendered at the same time as other German forces in the Netherlands, on 4 May 1945.

49th (West Riding) Division personnel, under the command of Brigadier Edward Neufville Crosse, disarmed and interned the remainder of the division, after some conflict between Dutch Resistance and the division. 212 officers and 5,744 other ranks were interned, while 1,070 horses and 578 carts constituted the division's transport equipment.

== Organization ==
The division consisted of the following.

- Division HQ
- SS-Feldersatz-Battalion 60
- Grenadier-Regiment 1
- SS Volunteer Grenadier Regiment 83 (3rd Dutch)
- SS Volunteer Grenadier Regiment 84 (4th Dutch)
- SS Artillery Regiment 60
- SS Panzerjäger Battalion 60
- SS Pionier Company 60
- SS Signals Company 60
- SS Veterinary Company 60
- SS Field post Department 60
- SS Medical Company 60

== List of commanders ==
The following were the commanding officers of the division.

- SS-Oberführer Viktor Knapp (11 May 1943 – 1 April 1944)
- SS-Obersturmbannführer Deurheit (1 April – 5 November 1944)
- SS-Standartenführer Martin Kohlroser (5 November 1944 – 8 May 1945)

== See also ==
- List of Waffen-SS divisions
- List of SS personnel
