= 100th Anti-Aircraft Brigade =

British Army anti-aircraft brigade in World War II

- Active: Apr 1943 − Feb 1946
- Country: United Kingdom
- Branch: British Army
- Type: Anti-aircraft brigade
- Role: Anti-aircraft defence; Anti-tank defence; River and bridge defence
- Part of: 21st Army Group
- Engagements: Second World War; Operation Overlord; Operation Market Garden; Battle of the Nijmegen salient; Operation Veritable; Operation Plunder; Operation Enterprise

Commanders
- Notable commanders: Edward Crosse, CBE, MC*; M. B. Turner DSO

The 100th Anti-Aircraft Brigade (100th AA Bde) was an air defence formation of the British Army during the Second World War. Formed in April 1943, the brigade was one of two mobile anti-aircraft brigades allocated to the Second Army for the campaign in North-West Europe, the other being the 106th AA Bde. In common with other anti-aircraft brigades, the unit took on anti-tank, river, ground and bridge defence, as well as laying smokescreens and providing fire support.

The brigade began landing in Normandy on 14 June 1944, before commencing operational duties in defence of Caen in July. It operated at or close to the front line of the Second Army's advance during the campaign in North-West Europe, taking on a number of short-lived deployments in major towns and cities and covering British forces during the breakout from Normandy, multiple river crossings and the advance into Germany in 1945. It was heavily involved in Operation Market Garden, and fought in a ground and anti-tank role at Veghel on what has become known as "Black Friday", before forming the anti-air, river and anti-tank defences of the bridges at Nijmegen.

At the cessation of hostilities the brigade moved to the Harburg area of Hamburg, where it took on occupational duties, including at the POW processing camp at Munsterlager. The brigade disbanded in February 1946.

== Formation ==
The brigade formed in April 1943, initially sharing 74th AA BDE headquarters in Cliftonville, near Margate in Kent. It was to be commanded by new Brigadier Edward Neufville Crosse MC, a veteran of the First World War who had served with the Royal Artillery since 1915. Its initial strength consisted of 90th Heavy Anti-Aircraft Regiment (90th HAA Rgt), 107th HAA Rgt, 113th Light Anti-Aircraft Regiment (113th LAA Rgt), and 123rd LAA Rgt.

In May 1943 the brigade relocated to Blandford Camp, near Blandford Forum in Dorset, where it remained until November for training in gunnery, searchlight operation and in radar operation. Trials were conducted with different types of Window to establish their respective effectiveness as a countermeasure against the radars in use by the brigade. The 1943 war diaries show that the brigade's regiments were occasionally involved in active air defence duties, but these were typically conducted under the command of other brigades.

In October 1943, the brigade conducted "Exercise Lobster" to rehearse the processes of embarkation, disembarkation and deployment, followed by "Exercise Shrimp" in January 1944 rehearsing the breakout from a beachhead. During this period brigade headquarters relocated again to The Lindens in Cliftonville, Northamptonshire, where its HQ remained until its deployment in June 1944.

== Operation Overlord ==
The first units of the brigade to land in Normandy did so on D-Day +8, 14 June. The 405th and 409th batteries of 123rd LAA Rgt came under the operational command of 80th AA Brigade, which had landed with the Juno beach assault waves on 6 June and taken up positions on the beachhead, prior to 100th AA Bde landing its HQ. The batteries were attacked from the air while unloading men and equipment onto two rhino ferries, with one man killed, 37 wounded and several guns and tractors destroyed. Lance Bombardier Henry Witts and Sergeant William Vernon were both awarded the Military Medal for their actions in the aftermath of this attack. The 100th AA Bde HQ landed a few days later, on 17 and 18 June, and established itself in Colombiers-sur-Seulles. The remainder of the brigade, consisting initially of 60th HAA Rgt and 113th LAA Rgt, along with 151st Anti-Aircraft Operations Room (AAOR) and the 557th Searchlight Battery (SL Bty), arrived through June and July, entering into secondments with other brigades while allied forces struggled to break out of the beachhead.

The 100th AA Bde's first major tasking came on 25 July, when it became operationally responsible for the air defence of Caen, which had been captured a few days prior after an unexpectedly protracted battle. The deployment was uneventful, as air attacks were light after the front line moved eastwards and concentrated around Falaise. 1st Canadian Army took over defence of the city on 12 August.

The allied break-out following the closing of the Falaise Pocket on 21 August led to a rapid succession of short-lived deployments for the brigade, by which point it had expanded to include 107th HAA Rgt and 71st LAA Rgt. On 24 August orders were received to prepare to move in support of the British crossing of the River Seine at Vernon bridge, and the brigade took position there on 26 August. Deployments at Amiens, Arras and Antwerp followed in support of XXX Corps' advance, with the latter reached on 4 September. The 106th AA Bde took over defence of the city two days later.

On 8 September, while in harbour near Diest after being relieved at Antwerp, 71st LAA Rgt shot down an Me262 jet while it was carrying out a low level bombing raid. This was one of the earliest ground-to-air kills of a jet aircraft. (Note: Published histories contain conflicting accounts of the earliest kill of a jet powered aircraft. Routledge and the war diaries all show a confirmed Me262 kill for the 71st LAA Rgt, then of the 100th AA Bde, in September 1944, and the 106th AA Bde's War Diary claims this as the first such kill. RAF Regiment histories make a claim that a later Me262 kill, on 26 November 1944, by 2875 Squadron RAF Regiment at Helmond airfield, was the first. This later kill is also listed in the 100th AA Bde war diaries as being shared by its 123rd LAA Rgt.)

== Advance into the Low Countries ==
=== Operation Crosseforce ===
The 100th Anti-Aircraft Brigade had been operating in a dual anti-air and anti-tank ground role throughout the advance, in common with the other leading anti-aircraft brigades, but the ground element of their role was significantly expanded on 9 September. The divergence of the advances of British XXX Corps and US XIX Corps had left a 25-mile gap on the right flank of 11th Armoured Division, leaving the lines of communication vulnerable to German counterattack which, based on intelligence reports, was being threatened by a large German armoured concentration believed at the time to comprise elements of II SS Panzer Corps. Operation Crosseforce was established, under operational instruction number 4. To 123rd LAA Rgt and 165 HAA Rgt were added 86th Field Regiment, Royal Artillery, 73rd Anti-Tank Regiment, the Royal Netherlands Brigade, one troop of the 13th/18th Royal Hussars and a company of the King's Royal Rifle Corps, forming a composite force for anti-tank and ground defence.

Defensive positions were established on a line centred at Beringen, with positions as far west as Geel and as far east as Helchteren. Brigade HQ itself was established at Leopoldsburg. In the event, no counterattack materialised and after six days the situation improved sufficiently for the brigade to be returned to regular duties. The action was important enough, though, to be mentioned in the citation for commander Brigadier Crosse's CBE nomination, which he received in October.

== Operation Market Garden ==
=== Orders and advance ===
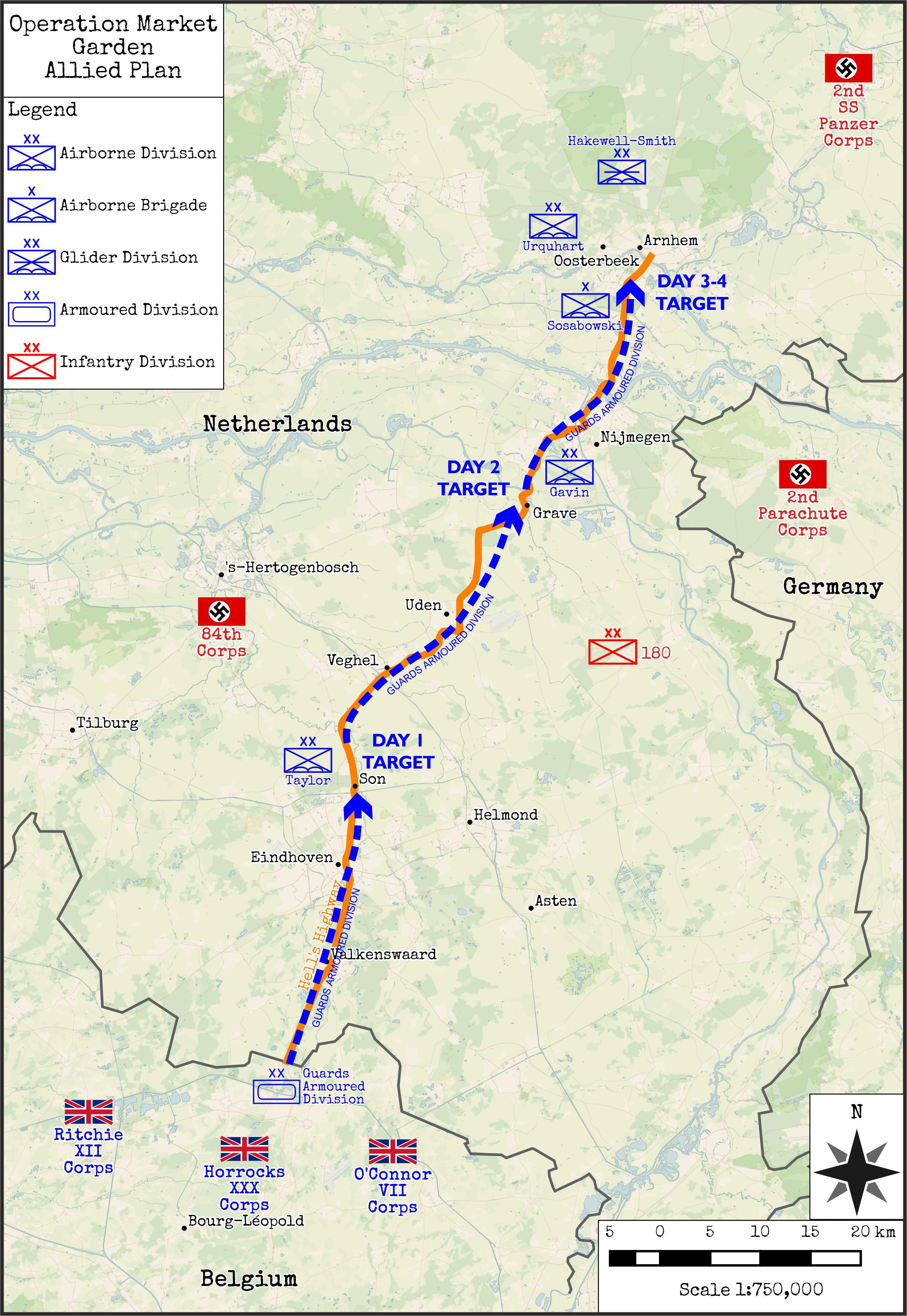
Operation Market Garden plan, showing "Hell's Highway" and the advance of the Guards Armoured Division. Key locations for the 100th AA Bde are shown: Son, Veghel, Grave, Nijmegen and Arnhem.

The brigade received its orders for Operation Market Garden on 16 September 1944. It was to provide anti-aircraft defence for XXX Corps and for the bridges over the River Waal once captured, and anti-motor torpedo boat defence. The 165th HAA Rgt and 123rd LAA Rgt were to cover Nijmegen, the 113th LAA Rgt Arnhem, and the 27th LAA Rgt, under operational command of the brigade, Grave, each with a searchlight battery. Detachments of the 27th LAA Rgt were to cover Veghel and Son.

An advance party began moving on 18 September, behind 32nd Guards Infantry Brigade. It came under air attack at Joe's Bridge and Grave, and took over the defence of the Nijmegen bridge on 21 September, after the city was cleared. The main body, including brigade HQ and 151st AAOR, began its advance on 20 September and reached Eindhoven on 21 September, its column repeatedly held up by traffic. The brigade's convoy numbered nearly 700 vehicles, 255 of them with the main body.

=== Veghel, 22 September ===
At about 0630 on 22 September the main body reached Veghel and was halted to allow 69th Infantry Brigade to pass. The 123rd LAA Rgt was at the head of the column, with brigade HQ and then the 165th HAA Rgt behind. Veghel was held by the 2nd Battalion, 501st Parachute Infantry Regiment of the US 101st Airborne Division. Late in the morning a German attack, including Kampfgruppe Walther and tanks of the 107th Panzer Brigade, began from the east. The action became known as "Black Friday", and Saunders describes it as probably the most significant interruption of XXX Corps' supply line during Market Garden.

The 123rd LAA Rgt, with E Troop of 408th Battery forward, deployed its Bofors guns, PIATs and Bren guns to defend the road, but at about 1130 came under small-arms and tank fire and withdrew to the edge of the town. E Troop's forward detachment and a Bren party under the Regimental Sergeant Major were cut off. The E Troop detachment tried to reach Veghel but was ambushed on the road, and its survivors sheltered in a farmhouse until relieved by the 32nd Guards Infantry Brigade. 2nd Lieutenant Jacques Hirsch, attached from the Belgian Military Mission, was awarded the Military Cross and Sergeant Alan Brunning the Military Medal for their actions.

Brigade HQ and 151st AAOR personnel took up ground defence positions in the town. The 165th HAA Rgt deployed guns in anti-tank and artillery roles, and personnel from its 275th and 317th batteries advanced as infantry in support of tanks of the 44th Royal Tank Regiment, suffering six killed and eight missing. Sergeant Francis Henwood and Lance Sergeant Alvin Leaver, the latter for bringing ammunition forward under fire, were each awarded the Military Medal.

On 23 September, American airborne troops advancing from Veghel and the 32nd Guards Infantry Brigade reopened the road. The brigade resumed its advance and reached Nijmegen in the early hours of 24 September. In its initial report the brigade recorded 15 killed, 34 wounded and 11 missing, and E Troop was too weakened to deploy at Nijmegen.

=== Deployment at Nijmegen ===
On arrival, the brigade immediately deployed its regiments to defend the key river crossings and bridges around Nijmegen. 27th LAA Rgt deployed in defence of Grave bridge and a bridge over the Maas-Waal Canal. 123rd LAA Rgt and 165th HAA Rgt, along with searchlights from 474 SL Bty and 557 SL Bty, deployed in defence of the main road, rail and pontoon bridges over the River Waal, both in a river and air defence role. 113th LAA Rgt arrived later that afternoon, but with its original objective of Arnhem uncaptured only deployed one battery initially, in an anti-aircraft role.

== Defence of the Nijmegen bridgehead ==
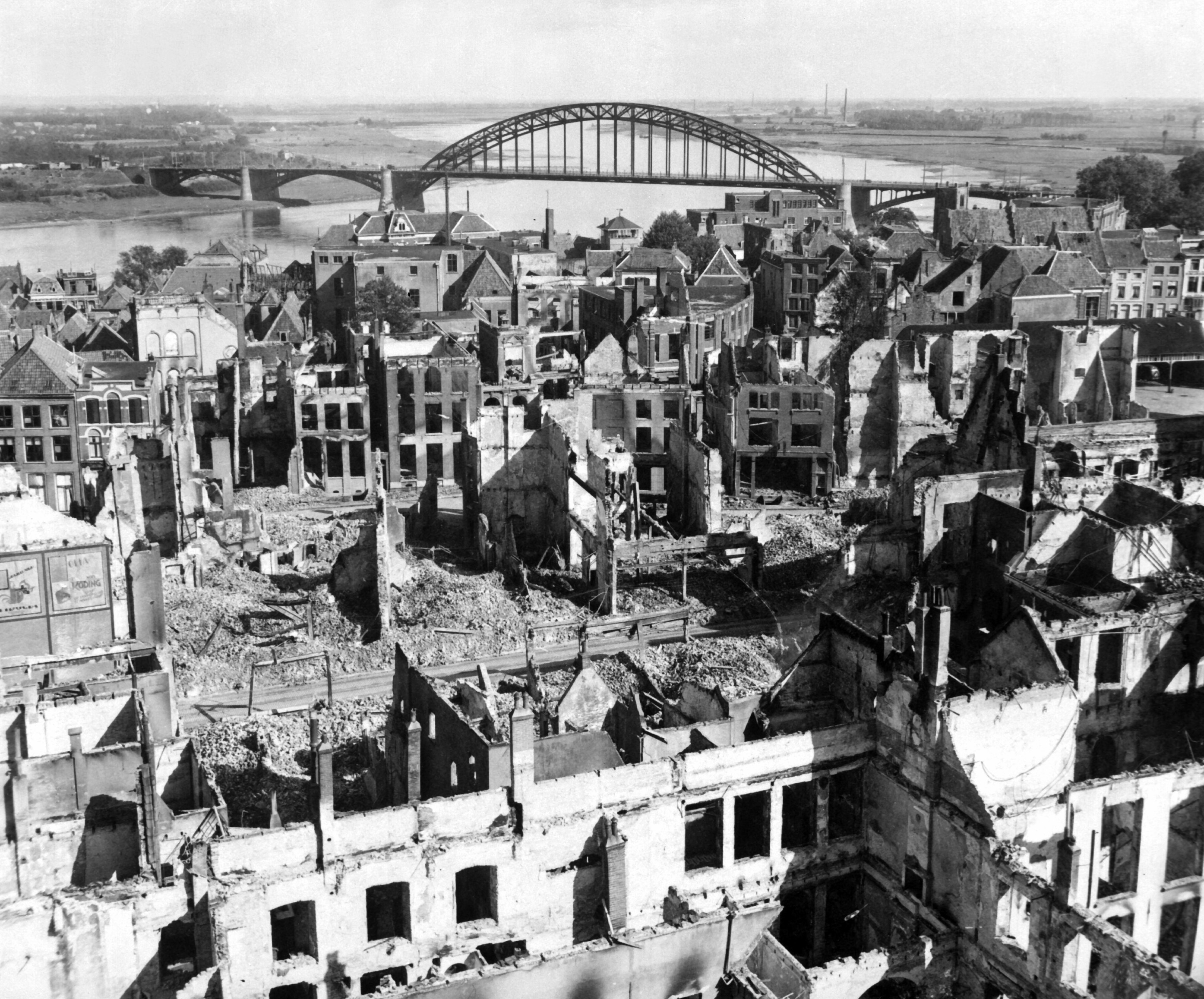
Nijmegen after the battle. 28 September 1944.

Significant aerial activity was recorded over and around the bridges in the following days and weeks, as Operation Market Garden transitioned into the Battle of the Nijmegen salient. The Luftwaffe had been ordered to target the bridges with every available bomber, and Hitler demanded that his headquarters be called immediately after attacks to inform them of success or failure. 117 German aircraft attacked the area around the bridges on the 25 September, including a single raid of 100 aircraft, and further large-scale raids followed on 27 and 28 September. As well as conventional and jet aircraft, the Germans also employed 'composite' or 'piggyback' bombers, though these were inaccurate and never hit the bridges. Reinforcements arrived on 27 September in the form of 107th HAA Rgt and the remainder of 113th LAA Rgt. Continuous action over 10 days resulted in 17 aircraft destroyed, with only slight damage to the bridges from the air.

While these raids failed to do significant damage to the bridges, German shelling continued to cause casualties amongst the deployed troops. Lieutenant Hugo O'Neill of the 165th HAA Rgt was awarded a Military Cross for his actions on 25 and 26 September, relocating his battery's guns by day, despite being under observation and constant attack, after shell fire killed five men and wounded four others.

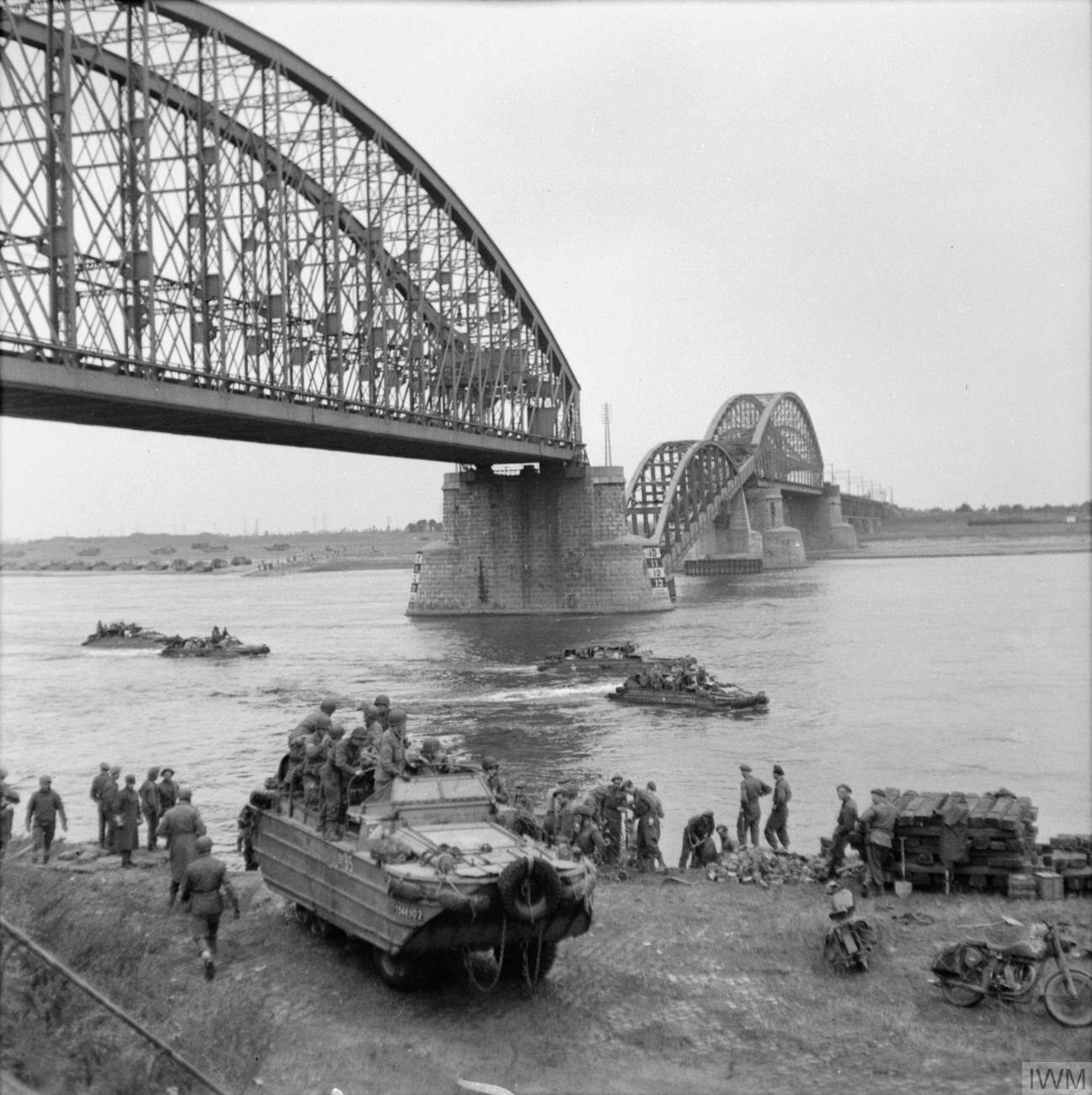
DUKWs transport supplies across the River Waal at Nijmegen, below the railway bridge whose central span was broken by German frogmen using floating mines, 28 September 1944

The most successful attacks against the bridges were riverborne. An attack by 12 frogmen on 28 September succeeded in destroying the railway bridge and damaging the road bridge, but a spirited defence and difficulty in handling the unwieldy explosives kept the road bridge operational. Ten of the twelve were captured, three of whom died from wounds. The threat of frogmen was a recurring one, with several killed or captured over the next two months of action. Floating mines were also a threat, launched up-river in groups of up to twelve to drift downstream with the intent of detonating on contact with the bridges. To protect against this, a boom was laid across the river with searchlights mounted on it to continuously illuminate the surface of the water.

No further damage was recorded to the bridges, but to bolster the defences further reinforcements were added to the roster of the 100th AA Bde in the shape of 90th HAA Rgt, 112th LAA Rgt, 321st LAA Bty of the 93rd LAA Rgt, as well as anti-tank guns, mortars and two infantry companies. Ten further aircraft were shot down during October, and the brigade was kept busy with further defence against swimmers and mines, fire support missions, laying of smoke screens and provision of artificial moonlight.

On 10 November, after 7 weeks of nearly constant action, the 100th AA Bde was relieved of its duties at Nijmegen by the 74th AA Bde.

== Winter in the Netherlands ==
The brigade redeployed and took on a number of duties in defence of towns and airfields adjacent to Eindhoven - Weert, Helmond and Deurne. A busy autumn for the brigade was followed by a lower tempo winter. The brigade's December war diary recorded activities in support of VIII and XII Corps, including bridge and air defence duties, but for the first time since Normandy some days reported only the weather. Various elements of the brigade went on training courses, or leave. Despite this, during November and December nine aircraft were damaged by the brigade and two destroyed, including the shooting down of an Me 262 over Helmond airfield, a kill shared with the RAF Regiment.

By the end of 1944, brigade records showed that, at its largest, twenty sub-units and more than 9,000 men came under its command. It had destroyed 68 enemy aircraft and damaged a further 46 during 550 engagements, firing 6,230 heavy anti-aircraft rounds and 65,220 light anti-aircraft rounds, for a recorded ratio of one aircraft destroyed for every 92 heavy and 959 light anti-aircraft rounds fired. In the ground role, the brigade fired 62,155 rounds of 3.7-inch ammunition, captured 92 prisoners, and destroyed two enemy tanks, with a possible third also credited, during the fighting at Veghel. These operations were conducted at a cost of 70 men killed, 262 wounded, and 21 missing.

1 January 1945 saw the only big raid that the brigade dealt with during its three-month deployment around Weert. 300 enemy aircraft were involved in general attacks on airfields, and 30–50 were observed over Helmond and Deurne. The brigade claimed 8 aircraft destroyed that day. Its total for January was 10, with a further 16 damaged across the three-month period.

== Advance into Germany ==
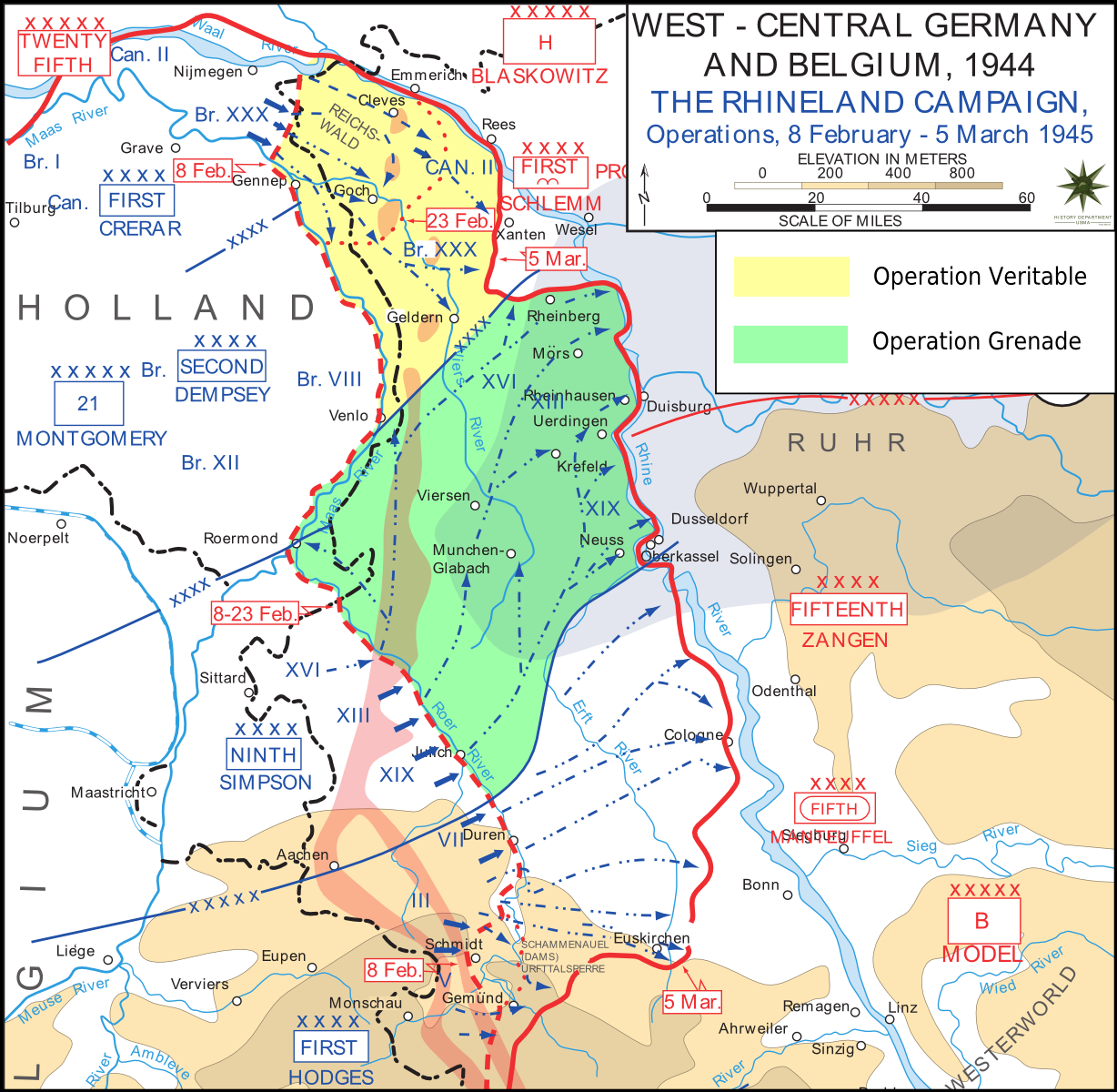
Operation Veritable and Grenade. 100th AA Bde's role was the defence of the river Maas crossings between Gennep and Venlo, on the boundary between the two operations, and it then moved to Xanten to prepare for Operation Plunder.

The 100th AA Bde had limited involvement in the initial stages of February 1945's Operation Veritable and Operation Grenade, the British crossing of the River Maas and American crossing of the River Roer respectively. The 90th HAA Rgt conducted fire missions in support of both British and American troops, and 113th LAA Rgt moved one battery, 368th, to Gennep in defence of the crossing there. They were supported by elements of 474th SL Bty, 151st AAOR and 63rd Anti-Tank Rgt. In early March, the LAA regiments of the brigade took on a larger role in the latter stages of Operation Veritable, taking over the air defence of Venlo, Lottum, Well and Gennep along the banks of the Maas river. There were sporadic raids by fighters and night bombing, but the war diary does not record significant action.

Brigadier Crosse left the brigade on 7 March 1945, to take on a role as Commander, Royal Artillery, 49th (West Riding) Division, which was to finish the liberation of the Netherlands while the bulk of Allied forces headed east into Germany. Brigadier Mark Buller Turner, DSO, who had commanded 60th HAA Rgt since landing in Normandy, would lead the brigade for the final few months and the advance across the Rhine.

=== Operation Plunder ===
Less than a week after the change in command, the brigade moved forwards to prepare for Operation Plunder and the crossing of the River Rhine. The 100th AA Bde was freed of its existing commitments to support XII Corps, while 106th AA Bde would do the same for XXX Corps. 100th AA Bde would command 90th HAA Rgt, 108th HAA Rgt, 113th LAA Rgt and 123rd LAA Rgt, 322nd Bty of 93rd LAA Rgt, as well as searchlights, radar and 151st AAOR, and once again it would provide air, river and ground defence. The brigade moved to the Xanten area, ready to defend the bridge and crossing points there.

Preparation for the operation was extensive. Ammunition dumping took place over two weeks, and due to the relatively flat terrain of the region, guns had to be moved up, dug in and concealed at night. Fire support missions began on 23 March, and Routledge notes that there are doubts as to whether the ammunition expenditure was justified. The 90th HAA Rgt fired 4,575 rounds in the night before the crossings were made, and 108th HAA Rgt fired 7,079, before taking part in a 30-minute anti-flak bombardment the following morning. The combined 11,654 rounds fired in a single night was nearly a fifth of the reported expenditure of the 100th AA Bde in 1944.

Air attacks on the 100th AA Bde positions were fewer than those experienced by their counterparts in the 106th AA Bde, but the war diary notes that overnight on the 24/25 March 28 mines, in groups of up to 8, were floated down the river. The experiences at Nijmegen had paid off and all were destroyed through a combination of searchlight tracking and both anti-aircraft and machine gun fire. Sporadic attacks by aircraft did occur, though, and by the end of March the brigade had confirmed 9 aircraft destroyed.

=== Final engagements ===
Following Operation Plunder, attention turned to the occupation of Germany. The brigade's HAA regiments were put onto battlefield clearance and transport duties after commanders judged that only LAA defence of the Rhine crossings was necessary, with the expectation that the HAA units be ready to deploy with notice if needed. The LAA units remained in defence of Rhine crossings at Xanten and Rees and for the first weeks of April there was relatively little air activity reported by the brigade, though Routledge reports that the 100th AA Bde was active in supporting the crossing of the River Weser by VIII and XII Corps between 9–11 April. The brigade's war diary does not record involvement in this operation.

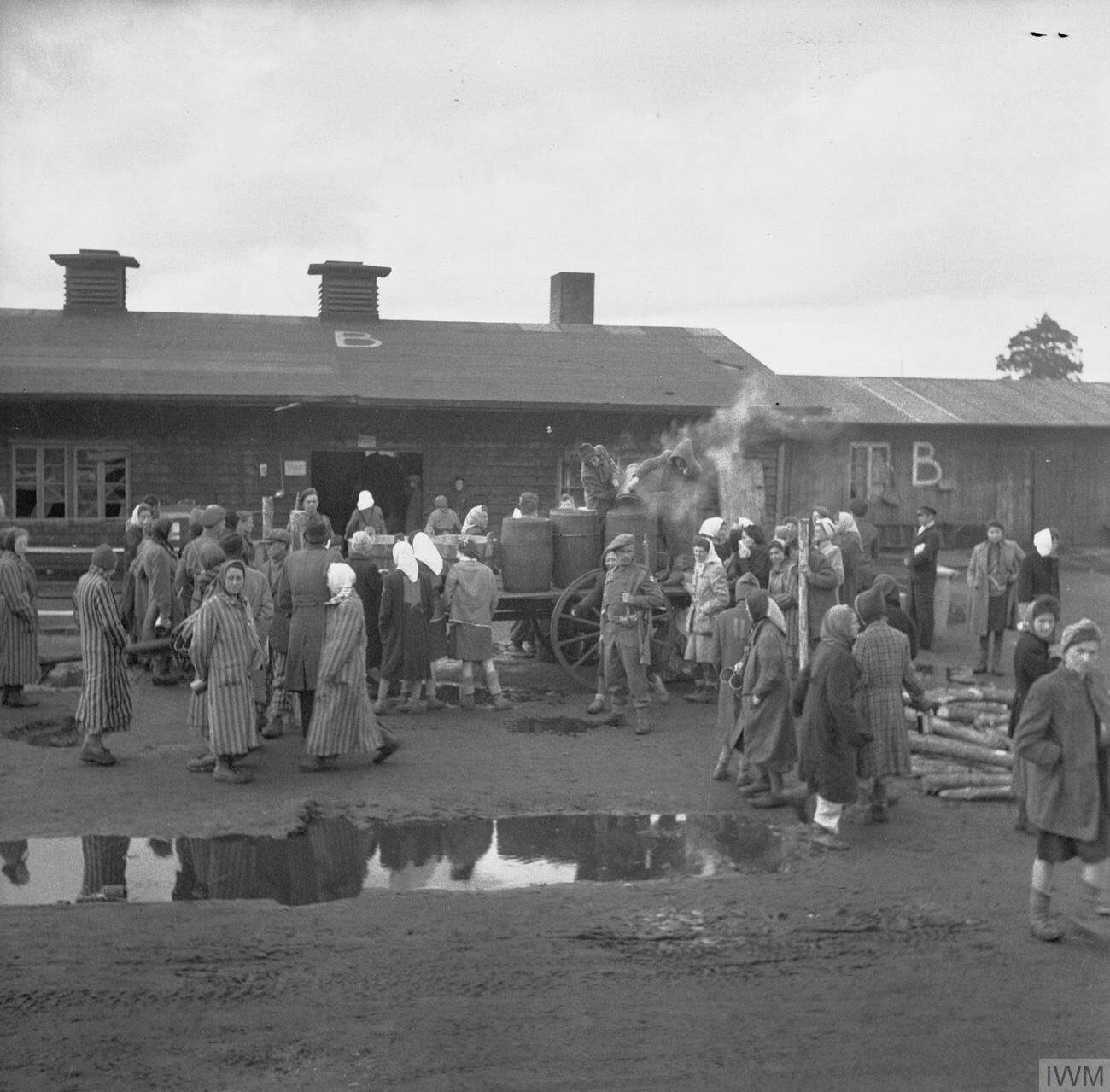
British troops distributing food at Bergen-Belsen

The 113th LAA Rgt was again detached and ordered to move to the newly liberated Bergen-Belsen concentration camp. This it did on 17 April, arriving at Bergen-Belsen 238 miles away in 22 hours. The regiment, and other men of the 100th AA Bde, were moved enough by the experience to produce a booklet containing photos, facts and a timeline of the duties carried out, written by Captain Andrew Pares. A copy is contained within Brigadier Crosse's private papers, shared with him by 113th's CO, Lt Col Mather. On completion of its duties, 113th LAA Rgt joined the 103rd AA Brigade.

On 24 April the brigade received orders that it was to support VIII and XII Corps in Operation Enterprise, the crossing of the River Elbe. With its regiments engaged on other tasks, 100th AA Bde was reinforced by units of the 106th AA Bde, taking onto strength 165th HAA Rgt, 71st LAA Rgt and 109th LAA Rgt, as well as elements of 121st LAA Rgt, 63rd Anti-Tank Regiment and searchlight units. Operation Enterprise launched on 29 April, with the Luftwaffe making significant attacks against the river crossings, with little success. The brigade claimed four aircraft destroyed, taking their total for April to seven. A further 3 were confirmed destroyed in early May, taking the brigade's total to 97 for the campaign.

== Post-war ==
After the cessation of hostilities, 100th AA Bde reverted to occupational duties in the vicinity of Harburg, Hamburg, though its primary deployment in the immediate post-war period was some 50 miles south at the POW processing camp at Munsterlager. A long-desired brigade rest centre, "100 Club", opened at the beginning of July 1945 in the area of Cranz, Hamburg, after first being mentioned in January.

With no airborne threat to face, the regiments of the brigade gradually gave in their guns, starting with 107th HAA Rgt in June. With no guns to maintain, the REME workshops also closed, and as the structure of the British Army of the Rhine (BAOR) became clearer, more regiments shuffled into other units. The brigade finally disbanded in February 1946.

== Order of Battle ==
The brigade's composition varied throughout the campaign as regiments and batteries were attached or detached according to operational needs. The table below summarises the principal named units under command during selected key periods.

Period	Heavy Anti-Aircraft Regiments	Light Anti-Aircraft Regiments	Other Notable Units	Notes
Formation (April 1943)	90th HAA Rgt; 107th HAA Rgt	123rd LAA Rgt	–	
Operation Overlord	60th HAA Rgt; 107th HAA Rgt*	113th LAA Rgt; 123rd LAA Rgt; 71st LAA Rgt*	151st AAOR; 557th SL Bty	In support of Second Army; 6 LAA Rgt in support for barrages 107th HAA and 71st LAA added to strength in Aug.
Operation Crosseforce	165th HAA Rgt	27th LAA Rgt; 71st LAA Rgt; 123rd LAA Rgt	73rd Anti-Tank Rgt; 13th/18th Royal Hussars (one troop); Royal Netherlands Brigade	In support of XXX Corps; 86th Field Rgt in support
Operation Market Garden (September 1944)	165th HAA Rgt	113th LAA Rgt; 123rd LAA Rgt; 27th LAA Rgt	474th SL Bty; 557th SL Bty; 151st AAOR	In support of XXX Corps
Nijmegen (September–November 1944)	165th HAA Rgt; 90th HAA Rgt*; 107th HAA Rgt*	112th LAA Rgt; 113th LAA Rgt; 123rd LAA Rgt; 321st Bty, 93rd LAA Rgt	344th SL Bty; 356th SL Bty; 474th SL Bty; 151st AAOR; 810th Pnr Smoke Coy	Anti-tank guns, mortars, two infantry companies in support 165th HAA replaced by 90th HAA in Oct
Operation Plunder (Rhine crossing) (March 1945)	90th HAA Rgt; 108th HAA Rgt	113th LAA Rgt; 123rd LAA Rgt; 322nd Bty, 93rd LAA Rgt; 2nd Indep. LAA/SL Bty	474th SL Bty; 806th Smoke Coy; 151st AAOR; 100th Radar Bty	In support of XII Corps; 324th Coy RASC
Operation Enterprise (Elbe crossing) (April–May 1945)	165th HAA Rgt	71st LAA Rgt; 109th LAA Rgt; 2nd Indep. LAA/SL Bty; Elements of 18th, 58th and 121st LAA Rgts	63rd A Tk Rgt	In support of VIII and XII Corps; 20 Canal Defence Lights in support

- Units marked with an asterisk (*) were attached to or detached from the brigade during the period shown.

== Bibliography ==
- Beevor, Antony (2018). Arnhem: The Battle for the Bridges, 1944 (Kindle ed.). London: Penguin Books. ISBN 978-0-14-194129-5.
- Routledge, N. W. (1994). Anti-Aircraft Artillery 1914–55. History of the Royal Regiment of Artillery. London: Brassey's. ISBN 978-1-85-753099-5.
- Saunders, Tim (2001). Hell's Highway: U.S. 101st Airborne & Guards Armoured Division. Battleground: WWII (Kindle ed.). Pen & Sword Books. ISBN 978-0-85-052837-4.
- Zaloga, Steven J. (2014). Operation Market-Garden 1944 (1): The American Airborne Missions. Campaign (Kindle ed.). Osprey Publishing. ISBN 978-1-78-200816-3.
