= Scouting in South West England =

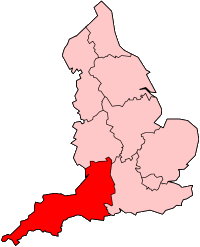

Scouting in South West England is about Scouting activities in the governmental region of South West England. The largest number of Scouts, volunteer leaders and groups are members of the Scout Association of the United Kingdom while there are some traditional Scouting groups such as the Baden-Powell Scouts' Association. The Scout Association administers the region through 7 Scout Counties, overseen by a regional commissioner, which follow the boundaries of the ceremonial counties they exist within. There are six active student associations at various universities in the region, each of which is affiliated to the Student Scout and Guide Organisation (SSAGO).

== The Scout Association Counties ==
=== Avon Scout County ===
County badge as worn on the uniform of Scout members in Avon.

Avon Scout County is concurrent with the former local government county of Avon and provides Scouting to young people in Bath and North East Somerset, Bristol, North Somerset and South Gloucestershire. The county is led by a volunteer management team of seventeen volunteers to support the adult support and youth facing functions of the county. As of 2018, they had 11,560 Scouts aged between 6 and 18 years of age and 3,984 adult volunteers. The county has its organisational headquarters at Woodhouse Park Activity Centre near the Bristol Channel and is divided into nine Scout Districts.

- Axe covering the area around the seaside town of Weston-super-Mare and named for the river of the same name.
- Bath covering the area around the city of Bath.
- Bristol South covering the area south of the city of Bristol. It was created in 2005 when two districts were merged.
- Brunel covering the North East quarter of the city of Bristol. The district was created through a reorganisation of the districts in the Bristol area in 2005.
- Cabot covering the North West of Bristol. As well as seventeen Scout Groups, the District runs eight Explorer Scout Units and a Network Unit.
- Cotswold Edge covers the area north of Bristol.
- Gordano, named for the valley in North Somerset.
- Kingswood, covering South Gloucestershire and North East Bristol.
- Wansdyke covering parts of North East Somerset around Bath.

Within the county, the former group of the 2nd Bristol (1st Ashton) Scout Group is notable as one of the founding troops of 1908. There is also a special Scout group at the Bristol Royal Hospital for Children which has been running since October 2001 with activities catered to specific limitations of the patients, and are open to any child staying in the hospital and their siblings.

Members of the county wear a badge on their uniform that depicts a Sea Stag, a creature with the head of a stag and the body of a fish that appears on the coat of arms of the former Avon County Council against a white background.

==== Avon Scout Radio ====
Avon Scouts is also home to Avon Scout Radio, a Scout Active Support Unit which broadcasts live from its studios in Bristol every day as well as from events around the county and further afield. Its stream is available on the web and runs JOTI Radio, the official radio station of the largest worldwide Scouting event.

=== Cornwall Scout County ===
County badge worn on the uniform of Scouting members in Cornwall.

Cornwall Scout County covers an area equal to the ceremonial county of Cornwall including the Isles of Scilly. The county is led by a volunteer County Commissioner and a team covering the different activities of the county. The county also has a 'Trust for Scouting in Cornwall' which provides grant assistance and fundraising for projects across the county. It is split into seven districts:

- East Cornwall
- Falmouth and the surrounding area on the Southern coast of the South West of the County.
- Mid Cornwall
- North Cornwall
- Penwith and Isles of Scilly covering groups in Penzance, St Ives and St Just.
- Stenek Ha'n Mor covering a vertical strip on the peninsula with groups on both North and South coasts. Covers the towns of Redruth, Helston, Hayle and Camborne.
- Truro

Within the county, the former group of the 1st Plymouth Scout Group is notable as one of the founding troops of 1908. Members of the county wear a badge on their uniform that depicts the arms of the Duchy of Cornwall showing a shield with fifteen circles arranged in an inverted triangular pattern with a crown above and the motto of Cornwall 'One and All' underneath on a dark green background.

=== Devon Scout County ===
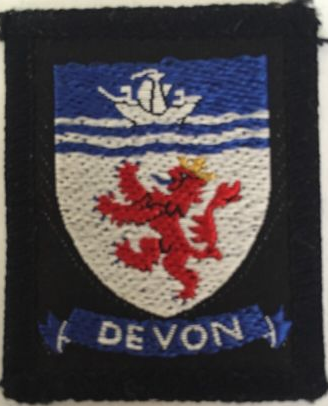
The badge of Devon Scout County.

Devon Scout County covers an area equal to the county of Devon and is led by a volunteer County Commissioner and a team of around twenty covering the different activities of the county, both in terms of youth programme and adult support. The county is divided into thirteen administrative districts:

- East Devon (covering the council area excluding Exmouth and Budleigh Salterton)
- Exeter
- Exmouth & Budleigh Salterton
- Mid Devon
- North Devon
- Plymouth
- Plym covering Plympton and Plymstock.
- South Hams
- Teignbridge
- Tiverton and surrounding area.
- Torbay
- Torridge
- West Devon

Within the county, the 1st North Devon (Barnstaple) Scout Group is notable as one of the founding troops of 1908. Members of the county wear a badge on their uniform that depicts the shield seen on the coat of arms of Devon County Council with a red lion on a silver background with a crown and a ship and waves above. The lion has links to the 13th century and Richard of Cornwall while the ship refers to the sea and voyagers including Francis Drake.

=== Dorset Scout County ===
The badge worn by members of Dorset Scout County.

Dorset Scout County covers the county of Dorset and provides Scouting opportunities for young people and adults in the area. The county's headquarters are located at the County owned activity centre at Buddens Scout Centre The county is led by a team of volunteer managers and trustees covering all aspects of youth programme and adult support and also employ some paid members of staff at the County Office. The county is currently divided into 8 Scout Districts:

- Bournemouth
- Christchurch
- Dorchester & West Dorset following the boundaries of the former West Dorset district council area.
- East Dorset following the boundaries of the former East Dorset district council area.
- North Dorset following the boundaries of the former North Dorset district council area.
- Poole
- Wareham and Isle of Purbeck
- Weymouth and Portland following the boundaries of the former Weymouth and Portland district council area.

The county is known for its long history of Scouting with the experimental Scout camp being held on Brownsea Island in Poole Harbour, Dorset, in 1907 and Scout Groups with a long history: the 1st Christchurch (Town), 1st Broadstone and 1st Parkstone (Lady B-P's Own) are all among the list of groups registered in 1908 in the county. Christchurch District are known for their creative outlets with a Scout and Guide band and Gang Show present in the district. In addition to the regular activities of Scouting, Dorset Scout County operate international expeditions, expeditions to complete the Queen's Scout and the Duke of Edinburgh's Award and county events including the County Banner camping competition and the international Jurassic Jamboree in 2018.

Members of Dorset Scout County wear a badge on their uniform that shows the coat of arms of the former Dorset County Council and in the future to belong to the current Dorset Council.

=== Gloucestershire Scout County ===
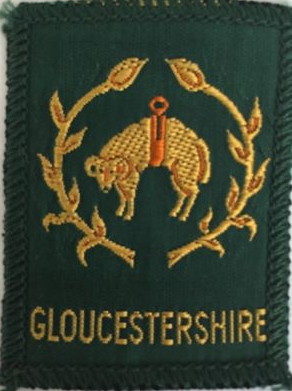
The badge of Gloucester Scout County.

Gloucestershire Scout County covers the political county of Gloucestershire. The county's headquarters has been located at the County owned activity centre at Cranham Scout Centre since 1947 and is manned by a paid county administrator. The county is led by a team of around twenty volunteer managers and trustees covering all aspects of youth programme and adult support divided into four areas matching the Scout Skills for Life strategic plan: Programme, People, Perception and Projects. The current County Lead volunteer is Carole O’Donnell, and is supported by four deputies, ten assistants and a Youth Lead to represent the young people of the County at the highest levels, currently Rhys Herschell-Burns. The county is currently divided into 8 Scout Districts:

- Cheltenham with 15 Scout groups.
- Cotswold including the towns of Cirencester and Fairford with 6 groups.
- Cotswold Vale includes the towns of Berkeley and Dursley and has 7 Scout groups.
- Forest of Dean including the area to the West of Gloucester and includes 10 groups.
- Gloucester with 17 Scout groups.
- North Cotswold district encompasses the towns of Chipping Campden and Moreton-in-Marsh and has 6 groups.
- Stroud and Tetbury with 15 groups.
- Tewkesbury with 6 groups.

Within the county, the 1st Cheltenham (Highbury) Scout Group is notable as one of the founding troops of 1908. Equally notable for their length of existence is the Gloster Gladiators Scout Band of the 46th Gloucester Scout Group which was formed in 1957.

Members of Gloucestershire Scout County wear a badge on their uniform that shows a sheep fleece, representing the wool trade historic to the area, which is also found on the Coat of Arms of Gloucestershire County Council.

==== Strategy and Evolution ====
The County run two large annual events for both Scouts and Guides, called Strategy and Evolution. They were created in 2015 to replace the long-running Sun Run and Malvern Challenge, which announced they were not being continued after 30 years in 2013 and which traditionally took place in the county. The event is run by the Strategy & Evolution Scout Active Support Unit within the county.

From 2015 until 2019, Strategy was an event for Scouts and Guides aged 10–14 years based at Cirencester Park. Intended to replace the Malvern Challenge, teams complete a series of challenges over a 3,000-acre area requiring team work and strategic thinking to complete. The 2020 event was cancelled due to the COVID-19 pandemic but from 2021 the event will be opened up to include Explorer Scouts and Rangers up to age 18 as well as the previously included Scouts and Guides with the older ages facing more difficult challenges.

Evolution was originally organised to replace Sun Run and was an event for Explorer Scouts, Senior Section members of Girlguiding, Scout Network and adult leaders between 2015 and 2019. While the event changed each year to keep it a surprise, it centred around a longer hike with fewer larger challenges: the 2019 event saw a 12-mile hike route. Similar to its sister event, the 2020 event was cancelled and from 2021 the event changed to become similar in format to Strategy but instead aimed at Cub Scouts and Brownie Guides.

The event has grown from over 1,200 young people attending the largest event, Strategy, in 2016. to accommodating 3,500 young people across both events in 2019.

=== Somerset Scout County ===
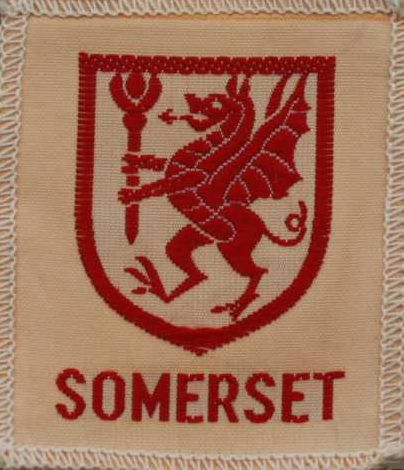
A former version of the badge worn by members of Somerset Scout County.

Somerset Scout County is the Scout Association county covering the four southern council areas of Somerset; the North Somerset and Bath and North East Somerset council areas are served by the Scout County of Avon. The County coordinates and supports over 4,000 young people and 1,000 adult volunteers and is led by a County Lead Volunteer, currently Dawn Wilson, and a team of around a dozen deputy and assistant managers. The County office is based out of Tangier Scout and Guide Centre which the county manages jointly with Blackdown Scout District and Taunton and Tone Girlguiding divisions.

The county is divided into three Scout Districts on the local level, which was reduced from seven in April 2014 following a restructuring linked to a County strategic plan. These are:

- Blackdown named after the Blackdown Hills AONB made up of the former Taunton Deane council area and the most Southern tip of Somerset formally the South Somerset district.
- East Somerset including the areas around Frome, Shepton Mallet and Yeovil.
- Moors and Coastal made up of the Sedgemoor council area and the former West Somerset council area and includes the coastal communities of the county and parts of Exmoor.

Members of Somerset Scout County wear a badge on their uniform that shows a red dragon rampant on a yellow background which also appears on the Flag of Somerset and on the shield of the Coat of Arms of Somerset County Council.

=== Wiltshire Scout County ===
Wiltshire Scout County covers the ceremonial county of Wiltshire. Led by a County Commissioner, Steve Barley as of 2020, and fourteen senior managers and volunteer advisors, the county provides support for leaders and runs events for scouts. The county run the Wiltshire Scout Centre in Potterne which is also the home of the county office.

The county is divided into seven Scout Districts for local administrative and supportive purposes.

- Mid Wiltshire covering the towns of Devizes and Calne and including 11 groups.
- North East Wiltshire, a self described rural district of nine groups including Marlborough.
- Salisbury and South Wilts covering the city of Salisbury and the surrounding settlements in the south of the county including Amesbury and Wilton. It is the largest district in the county with 20 Scout groups.
- Swindon North including the northern half of the town of Swindon and areas to the North including Cricklade and Highworth with 13 Scout groups.
- Swindon Ridgeway including the southern half of the town of Swindon and villages to the South including Wroughton and Royal Wootton Bassett with 11 Scout groups.
- Wiltshire North including Ashton Keynes, Chippenham, Malmesbury and surrounding areas with 10 Scout groups.
- Wiltshire West covering Bradford on Avon, Melksham, Trowbridge Warminster and Westbury with 13 Scout groups.

An eighth district, Salisbury Plain, existed until c.2013 before the groups were split between the neighbouring three districts. Support had been provided by these three districts prior to the merge with district support diminished; one assistant leader in the district was charged with fraud that same year.

Members of Wiltshire Scout County wear a badge on their uniform that shows a white horse galloping to the right against a dark green background, which is seen as an icon of the county.

== Baden-Powell Scouts' Association ==
The Baden-Powell Scouts' Association also operate a number of Scout Groups in the region.

== Student Scout and Guide Organisation ==
There are six active student associations at various universities in the region, each of which is affiliated to the Student Scout and Guide Organisation (SSAGO). These are Scouts and Guides at the University of Bath (BUGS), University of Bristol (UOBGAS), Penryn Campus run jointly by the University of Exeter and Falmouth University (Kernow SSAGO), University of Exeter (SAGE), and Plymouth University (PLUGS).

SSAGO Clubs previously existed at Bath Spa University and the University of the West of England, Bristol (SAGUWE).

== Campsites ==
=== Avon ===
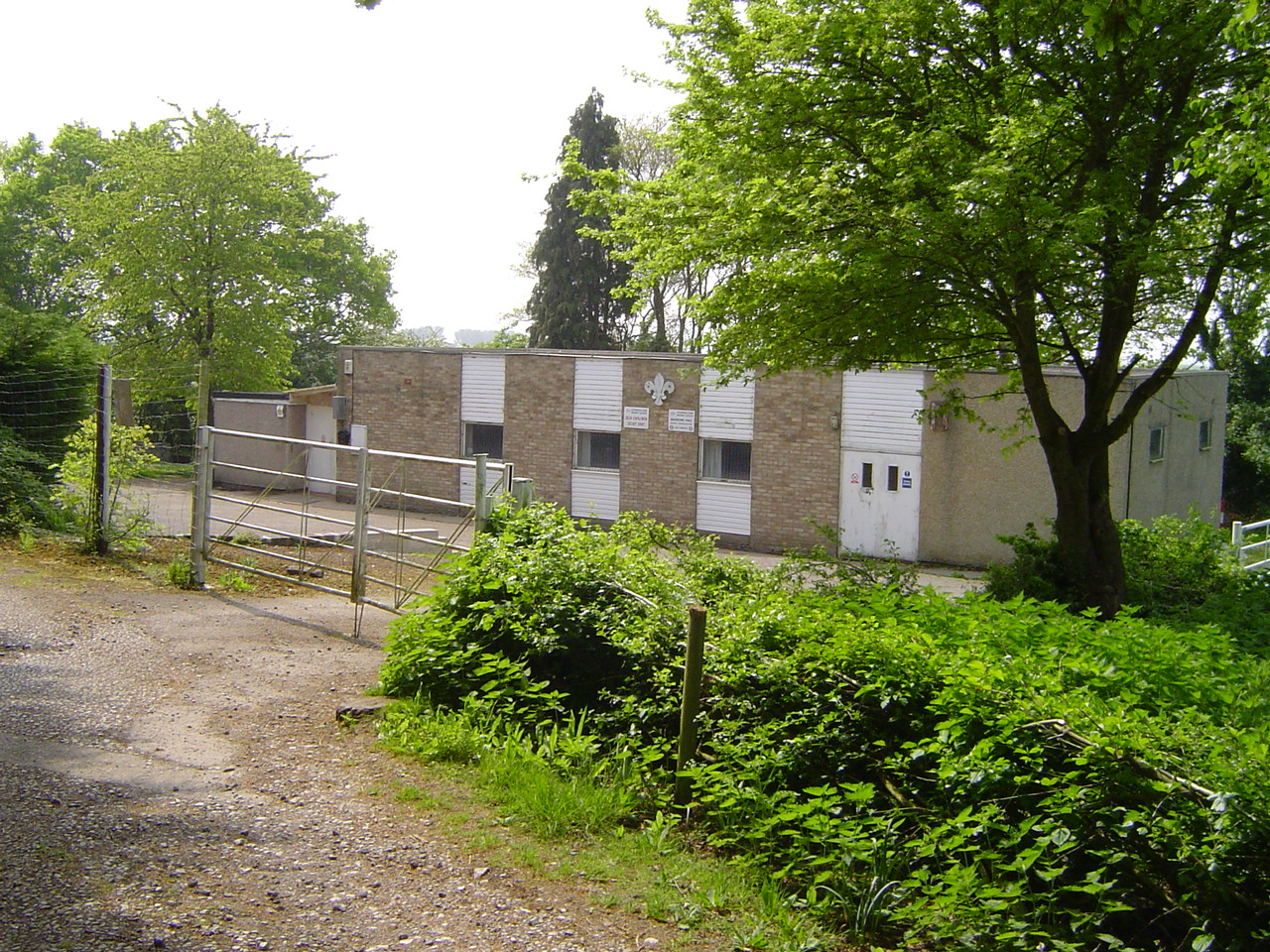
Mafeking Hall

There are eight campsites or activity centres within the Avon area with the largest being Woodhouse Park which also acts as the headquarters of Avon Scout County. Centenary Wood is a campsite run by Avon Scouts that was created for the centenary of Scouting in 2007 and is located near Bath.

The majority of the remaining campsites and activity centres are owned and operated by local Scout groups and districts. Glenny Wood consists of a seasonal camping field and lodge in Portishead, North Somerset and is run by Gordano Scout District. Chelwood is a campsite and barn owned by the 1st Keynsham Scout Group, in the Wansdyke Scout District. Cleeve Hill is a 3-acre campsite and building owned by the City of Bath Scout District and acts as their headquarters. Eastwinds is an activity centre run by Bristol South Scout District that combines a small campsite with indoor facilities in Brislington, near to the centre of Bristol. Mafeking Hall is located near Coalpit Heath, in the Cotswolds of South Gloucestershire. As well as the hall, there are a number of camping fields available to Scouts and Guides.

==== Benjamin Perry Boathouse ====
The Benjamin Perry Boathouse, or BP Boathouse for short, is a water activity and training centre situated in Harbourside in Bristol, jointly owned and managed by Avon Scout County and Girlguiding Avon and South Gloucestershire. Named after a Victorian warehouse keeper and later docking firm that owned the building when first built, the building was restored in 1982 by the Scouts and Guides as an activity centre. Laid out over two floors, the boathouse has a meeting hall and kitchen above a canoe and boat storage area.

==== Woodhouse Park ====
Woodhouse Park is owned by Avon Scouts and serves as their county headquarters in South Gloucestershire, overlooking the Severn crossings. Between April 2011 and January 2021, it was run by the Scout Association as one of their national Scout Adventure Centres, however this ceased following the financial difficulties of the association following the Coronavirus pandemic.

The site has five large camping fields, and two buildings which can be used for accommodation or training purposes. Activities offered include Abseiling, Climbing, Archery, and Air Rifles with Sailing, Kayaking, and Caving available off-site.

=== Cornwall ===
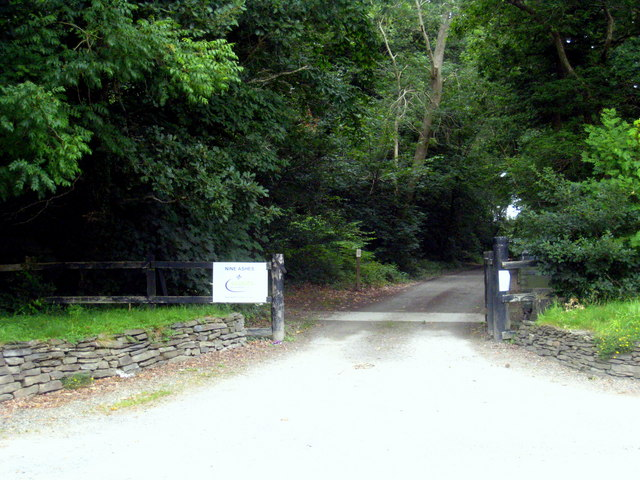
The entrance to Nine Ashes Activity Centre.

The largest of the campsites in the county is Nine Ashes Activity Centre which is owned and managed by Cornwall Scout County and is located on part of the Pencarrow estate in Washaway, Bodmin. The site consists of 25 acres of woodland and 5 acres of camping field as well as a bunkhouse and activity barn and offers activities including climbing, zip wire, assault course, a cave system and archery.

Some of the Scout districts also run smaller campsites in the county. Hooe Lake Campsite is located in Mount Edgcumbe Country Park on the Rame Peninsula and is the campsite of the East Cornwall district containing just a camping field. Drummers Lodge Campsite near St Austell is the campsite for Mid-Cornwall district and contains an indoor accommodation block and four acres of camping field. Tomperrow Campsite is run by Truro Scout district, who acquired the site in 1990, and now consists of an indoor accommodation building and five acres of camping in Threemilestone in a valley near Truro. Trencrom, near Lelant, is run by the Penwith and Isles of Scilly Scout district and contains a small area for camping, an indoor activity building and activities including high ropes, crate stacking and archery. There is also Lansallos Scout Camp which is run by the National Trust and open to youth groups.

=== Devon ===
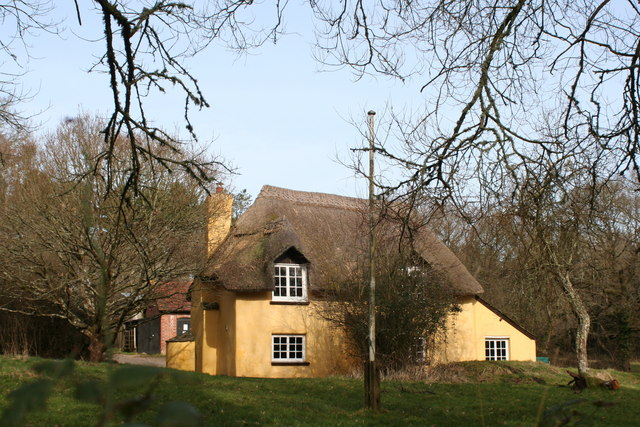
Caddihoe Scout Campsite, showing the cottage.

There are seven campsites in Devon that are primarily for Scout use. Blindman's Wood is an indoor Scout centre in Plymouth with a small area for activities and which is open to community groups. Caddihoe Campsite on the edge of Ashclyst Forest (part of the Killerton estate) offers simple camping facilities on five fields and two barns for indoor activities. Callisham Cross in Yelverton consists of two camping fields with easy access to Dartmoor National Park. Foxcove Campsite near Wembury is run by the Plym Scout district and includes simple camping facilities and a building for indoor activities.

Until 2009, Devon Scouts also had use of accommodation within Dewerstone Cottages on the edge of Dartmoor, leased from the National Trust. However the cost of a maintenance overhaul resulted in the Scouts returning the site to the Trust, who subsequently re-let the site to the Spirit of Adventure outdoor education company as a bunkhouse.

Scouts also have use of Taw Bottom near Okehampton, run by Girlguiding Devon, which has camping fields an indoor activity centre and simple on-site activities.

==== Collard Bridge ====
Run by the North Devon Scout district, Collard Bridge is an activity centre near Barnstaple. As well as a number of sites for camping, the centre also has two indoor activity and classroom buildings and an activity barn where activities can be completed under cover. Activities available on the site include climbing and abseiling, archery, tomahawk throwing, rifle shooting, assault course and a tunnel complex.

==== Watcombe ====
The Torbay District Scout Campsite at Watcombe, north of Torbay is run by the district of the same name located close to the South West Coast Path and Dartmoor. As well as two camping fields, the site also has two indoor accommodation buildings with halls for activities. The site offers activities including rifle shooting, archery, pioneering, caving, crate stacking, axe throwing and grass sledging.

=== Dorset ===
Dorset has a number of campsites and activity centres with many drawn by the landscape and environment and its location near to Brownsea Island Scout camp where Scouting started in 1907. Dorset Scouts own Buddens Scout Adventures near Wareham and is the location of their county office while the extensive activity centres at Bragger's Wood and Butcher's Coppice are run by Christchurch Scout district and Bournemouth Scout district respectively.

In addition to these larger centres, there are a number of smaller and more simple sites across the county. Brownjohn's Copse is a wooded site near to Poole Harbour run by Dorchester and West Dorset Scout district with camping space normally for one group and favoured by expedition groups. The same district also runs Scoutland campsite in Beaminster, a small camping site with access to the Jurassic Coast and nearby Area of Outstanding Natural Beauty.

==== Braggers Wood ====
Located in Bransgore, Christchurch, Braggers Wood Scout Centre is owned and run by Christchurch Scout District. The site was gifted in 1958 by the landowner Baron Manners and became a full activity centre in 1965 with the appointment of a warden.

The eight acre site contains a number of campsites, initially allocated to groups within the district, and activities including climbing, rifle shooting, high ropes and zip-wire. There are also two lodges which are used as indoor accommodation, indoor activity space and meeting space for training and section meetings.

==== Brownsea Island ====
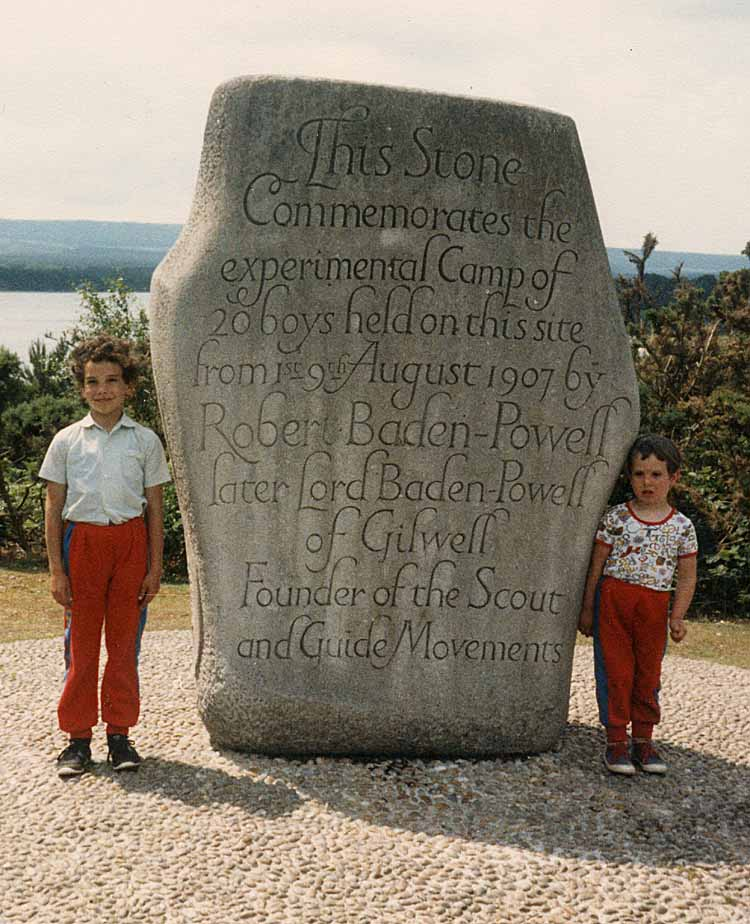
The monument commemorating the first Scout camp

Brownsea Island Scout camp is located on Brownsea Island in Poole Harbour and is notable among Scouting as being the location of the first experimental Scout camp which is considered the start of Scouting across the world. It is run in partnership between Wareham and Isle of Purbeck District together with the National Trust and the Girl Guiding Movement. It includes a camp site open to both the public and groups of Scouts and Guides and an Outdoor Centre with a trading post shop and activities for young people.

The camp, held from 1 August until 8 August 1907 was for 22 boys led by Lieutenant General Baden-Powell with the findings used in Scouting for Boys. One century on, in 2007, there were a number of events held on Brownsea Island. During the summer, The UK Scout Association held four camps, the Patrol Leaders Camp (a gathering of Scouts from every region of the UK), the New Centenary Camp (UK Scouts of every religion, race and background) the Replica Camp (A living Museum of the camp 100 years before) and the Sunrise camp which brought together 310 young people from 155 countries to celebrate the centenary of Scouting. As part of this, on 1 August 2007, all 28 million Scouts from around the world renewed their Scout Promise at 8 am local time as part of the Sunrise Ceremony, with Brownsea Island being a focal point of the celebrations.

==== Buddens ====
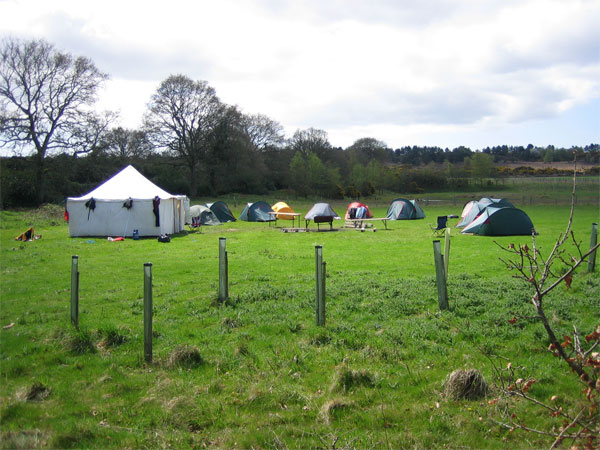
Camping at Buddens Scout Adventures.

Buddens Scout Adventures is a Scout adventure centre in Wareham, Dorset that is owned by Dorset Scouts and since 2017 has been run by the Scout Association through their Scout Adventures division. The 95-acre site was bought in 1994 as a former farm and quarry site and has since been developed as a large camp site and activity centre with 15 acres set aside as a Site of Nature Conservation Interest.

The site contains a number of very large camping fields, a 45-bed tented village, a three level tunnelling complex, an 8.5-acre lake which is used for a variety of water activities. Since becoming part of the Scout Adventures section of the Scout Association, the centre has seen a number of improvements including a 15-metre climbing and high ropes tower. In October 2020, the Scout Association announced that they would be reducing the number of adventure centres following the financial impact of the coronavirus pandemic as a result of the need to reduce staffing costs and assets, resulting in the association looking to cease running Buddens as a national Scout Adventure centre and return the running to Dorset Scouts directly.

==== Butcher's Coppice ====
Located in the northern neighbourhoods of Bournemouth, Butcher's Coppice is run by Bournemouth Scout District. The site was first purchased from Lord Wimborne in 1931, with the Scouts leasing the site from the owner until purchasing the site outright in 1937. It was established with amenities in the 1930s and 1940s primarily by Rover Scouts and has been more extensively renovated and redeveloped with modern facilities since 1997.

The seven and a half acre site contains camping on both open field and woodland copse sites and has three indoor accommodation centres (Jubilee, Dad Atckins and Explorer Centres) which sleep a combined 96 beds. The site offers a number of adventurous activities including eight high ropes activities, archery, air rifle shooting, tomahawk throwing, fencing, an artificial caving bus and a climbing wall in addition to other indoor and outdoor activities.

=== Gloucestershire ===
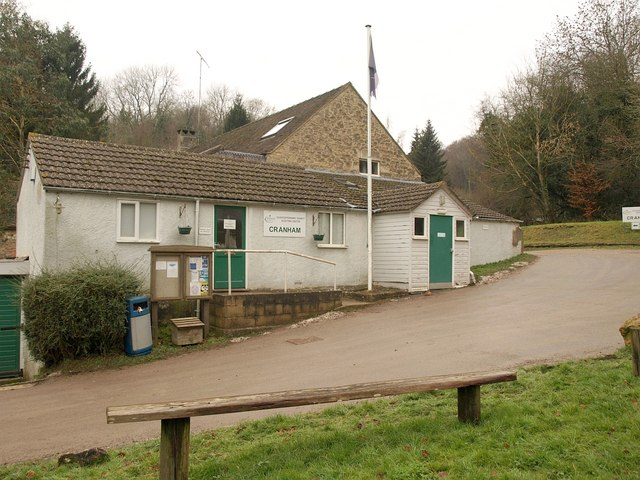
The Scout Centre at Cranham, the centre run by Gloucestershire Scout County.

The primary activity centre in Gloucestershire is the county-run Cranham Scout Centre but there are a number of other smaller centres across the county. Stroud and Tetbury Scout district runs Penn Wood Activity Centre and contains camping, simple activities, a 26-bed bunkhouse and an indoor activity lodge at the heart of Selsley Common. The same district also run St. Swithun's Hall in Leonard Stanley, which acts as their district headquarters, and consists of a camping area and indoor activity hall building. The Forest of Dean is the location of Deer Park Campsite near Lydney which is run by the district of the same name as their campsite and offers basic camping with few facilities and on-site activities. Nearby Parkend in the same district houses Beaver Lodge with camping space and indoor activity space through a hall. The Mayhill and Huntley Scout group also operate a large open campsite and activity barn on May Hill with amenities for campers.

==== Cranham ====
Cranham Scout Centre is situated in a Cotswold valley on the edge of the village of Cranham. It is owned and managed by Gloucestershire Scout County and acts as their headquarters. The site was opened in 1947 by Chief Scout, Lord Rowallan as a camping site and since the 1970s has also had indoor sleeping accommodation. It also has a wooded valley known as Daniels Grove where there are facilities for 12 smaller "patrol" camp sites. It is adjacent to over 1,200 acres (4.9 km^{2}) of beech woodland to which there is access for activities such as nature trails and orienteering.

In addition to the sites residential bunkhouse and main centre which is used for training and indoor activities, the site contains a number of outdoor activities including archery, rifle shooting, traverse climbing wall, caving complex and challenge course.

=== Somerset ===
The main activity centre for Somerset is located at Huish Woods, run by the Blackdown district, while the East Somerset district run the Tedbury Campsite Campsite near Frome for basics camping in clearings of ancient woodland. The county also houses Horner Wood Campsite at Horner near Porlock which has camping fields in a riverside location with simple activities and a site run by a local group in Bishops Lydeard.

Between 1981 and 2014, the former Sedgemoor Scout district operated the Campbell Room, an all-year indoor self-catering centre on the Quantock Hills. Control of the site transferred in 2014 to the YMCA to secure the young term future of the site although the site continues to be available to other youth groups including the Scouts.

==== Huish Woods ====
Blackdown District Scouts own and operate Huish Woods Scout Campsite in the Blackdown Hills near Taunton, which has 40 acres (16 hectares) of woodland for camping with a large camping field and 18 smaller woodland sites. The site also has indoor accommodation that sleeps up to 62. The site also offers adventurous activities including climbing, caving, zip wire, aerial runway, bouldering, archery and rifle shooting.

=== Wiltshire ===
Wiltshire Scout County own and operate the Wiltshire Scout Centre near Potterne. A large building provides indoor accommodation, together with six camping areas and several meeting rooms which are used for training in the county.

West Wiltshire District in 2012 acquired Jubilee Wood Scout Camp near West Ashton. The 14-acre (5.6-hectare) site was purchased in 2012 after the district lost the use of their former campsite at Roundwood. Previously agricultural land, the new site is being planted as woodland to commemorate the Diamond Jubilee of Elizabeth II.

Scouts in the county also have access to Oxenwood Outdoor Education Centre in Marlborough which contains accommodation and activities and was until 2019 owned by Wiltshire Council before being transferred to Community First and Youth Action Wiltshire.

== Gang Shows ==
The Bath and District Gang Show was started in 1997, and generally has a cast of about 60 Scouts and Guides. Cast only have to audition for solos, duets and sketches and any member of the Scouts or Guides prepared to give the required commitment to the show can take part. The show takes place each year at the Kingswood School Theatre, in Lansdown, Bath. In 2004, the Gang Show were awarded the Gang Show Emblem. In 2008 the show was awarded the NODA's Stage Electric's award for technical achievement. In November 2009 they performed at the Bath Male Choir concert at the Bath Forum. In December 2008 and 2009, they staged 'A Christmas Carol' and 'The Lion, the Witch and the Wardrobe' at the Rondo Theatre, Bath. Members of the team also production manage events at various international jamborees. 2012 marks their 15th anniversary and plans are in place to stage a special performances from 6–10 June to make these celebrations as well as a Christmas show at the Rondo in December 2012.

The Bristol Gang Show was held annually at The Bristol Hippodrome, in Bristol. In the 1930s there were two Boy Scout Revues. The Bristol Gang Show started in its current form in 1971, with a cast consisting of 85 Cubs and 59 adults, in the Victoria Rooms. It moved to the Bristol Hippodrome in 1972. In 1974 the Bristol Gang Show became Avon County Gang Show as the county of Bristol had become part of the Avon. In 1975 the show was awarded the Gang Show Emblem to wear on the red Gang Show neckerchiefs. Ralph Reader, who founded the Gang Show idea, came to see the show in 1978 and gave it much praise. In 1997 the show celebrated its Silver Jubilee, and regained its title of Bristol Gang Show. In 1999 girls were introduced into the junior cast, and now account for about half of the total junior cast. The show is no longer a Gang Show, but has become the grass roots show of Avon Scouts on Stage and is open to all Scouting members in the county.

Exeter Gang Show, also known as Exeter and District Scout and Guide Gang Show, has been performed every year in late March or April since 1983 (except 2004) at the Barnfield Theatre in Exeter. Members of the cast also participated at a Gang Show at the 1986 Westcountry Jamboree. Exeter Gang Show gained the national recognition of wearing the Red Scarf in 1987.

Gloucester Gang Show is an annual production held at the Bacon Theatre, Dean Close School, Cheltenham

North Devon Gang Show in Barnstaple was started in 1980. It was awarded the Gang Show emblem in 1985.

Plymouth Gang Show - started 1984.

Swindon Gang Show, started as Thamesdown Gang Show, has been running since 1976.

Taunton Gang show, held annually since 1989.

== See also ==
- Scouting sections
- Neighbouring areas:
  - Scouting in South East England
  - Scouting in Wales
  - Scouting in West Midlands
- Girlguiding South West England
- Olivia Burges
- Bleimor (Scouting)
