= John Rawlins (Royal Navy officer) =

Royal Navy officer and pioneer in the field of diving medicine

Surgeon Vice-Admiral Sir John Rawlins KBE FRCP FRAeS
- Born: 12 May 1922; Wiltshire, England
- Died: 27 July 2011 (aged 89)
- Relatives: Colonel Stuart Rawlins (father)
- Military career
- Allegiance: United Kingdom
- Branch: Royal Navy
- Service years: 1946–1980
- Rank: Surgeon Vice-Admiral
- Commands: RN Medical Director General (1977–80); Institute of Naval Medicine (1975–77); Director of Health and Research (Naval) (1973–75)
- Awards: Knight Commander of the Order of the British Empire

Sir John Stuart Pepys Rawlins (12 May 1922 – 27 July 2011) was a Royal Navy officer and pioneer in the field of diving medicine.

== Royal Navy ==
Rawlins was the son of Colonel Stuart Rawlins. He was educated at Wellington College, read medicine at University College, Oxford and trained at Barts, graduating in 1945. Soon after, Rawlins began his career as a surgeon lieutenant Royal Navy Volunteer Reserve officer and was assigned to the Colossus class aircraft carrier HMS Triumph in 1947. After transitioning from the reserves to active duty in 1951, Rawlins was assigned to the RAF Institute of Aviation Medicine (IAM). He was appointed a Member of the Order of the British Empire in 1955 for his work with protective helmets, and was promoted to the rank of surgeon commander while he continued his research at the IAM until 1961. That year he was advanced to Officer of the Order of the British Empire for his work on the automatic underwater escape system. Rawlins was also a member of the US Navy SEALAB project.

Rawlins served as the RN Director of Health and Research from 1975 to 1977 and later as the RN Medical Director General from 1977 to 1980 when he retired as surgeon vice admiral.

== Other honours ==
In 1971, Rawlins also served as the first "past president" on the founding executive committee for the European Underwater and Baromedical Society.

The Gilbert Blane Medal of the Royal College of Surgeons was awarded in 1974 for his work on cold in diving. Rawlins was a British Sub-Aqua Club Honorary Life Member as well as President of the Historical Diving Society and the Association of RN First Class Divers. He received the Lowell Thomas Award from The Explorers Club in 2000.
