= Scouting in Guernsey =

Scouting in Guernsey is organisationally part of the Scout Association of the United Kingdom, covering the Bailiwick of Guernsey in the Channel Islands, which are not part of the United Kingdom.

The Guernsey Scout Association is the largest co-educational youth organisation within the Bailiwick of Guernsey. As of 2016 over 700 young people and 150 adults are members, belonging to the 10 groups in Guernsey and 1 in Alderney.

The Bailiwick Commissioner is Nick Paluch and there are no separate Districts.

The administrative centre is located at Les Maingys Activity Centre and Campsite which offers over 17 acres of Guernsey countryside. A large modern activity centre with an indoor climbing wall and sports hall. Many other activities such as archery, football, volleyball and other sports take place. The centre also has two large meeting rooms and a commercial kitchen to cater for small, large and corporate events. Alongside the centre is a traditional Guernsey farmhouse, known as the Hostel, which sleeps 32 and is hired out to all. On-site there is a reservoir where canoeing, rafting and other activities can take place. The site also has a large campfire circle.

During the German occupation in World War II, Scouting was banned, but continued undercover.

== See also ==
- Girlguiding South West England
