= Olivia Burges =

British Scouting and Guiding advocate

- Born: 19 September 1892; Westbury-on-Trym, Gloucestershire, England
- Died: 3 August 1930 (aged 37); Hendon, Middlesex, England
- Occupation: Guiding
- Spouse: Stuart Blundell Rawlins (m. 1925)
- Children: 3

Millicent Olivia Rawlins (née Burges; 19 September 1892 – 3 August 1930) was a British Scouting and Guiding advocate. She was secretary to the Girl Guides' and Girl Scouts' first World Camp.

== Family life ==
Burges was the first daughter of Colonel William Edward Parry Burges and Millicent Pettingal Burges (née Miller). She was raised at the family's home in South Gloucestershire, called The Ridge. She had one sister.

Burges married Major Stuart Blundell Rawlins in 1925. They had two sons, Christopher and Philip. At age 37, Burges died giving birth to her third child, a daughter, who also died.

== Scouting ==
The Burges family were friends of Robert Baden-Powell, 1st Baron Baden-Powell, who founded Scouting in 1907 and Guiding in 1910, and his wife, Lady Baden-Powell.

In April 1914, Burges founded a Scout troop at Chipping Sodbury. Assisted by her sister, meetings were initially held at The Ridge. During World War I, the boys became messengers for a regiment quartered in Chipping Sodbury. Records from 1917, describe the Scout troop involved in the 'Air-Craft Defence Scheme'. A list of names and addresses was held at Chipping Sodbury Police Station of all Scouts who owned a bicycle and were able and willing to undertake delivering messages in an emergency.

== Guiding ==
Burges became involved in Guiding around 1916. For several years, she sat on the Guides' executive committee as head of Rules and Awards.

Olave Baden-Powell and Burges formulated the idea for the first World Camp in September 1923, during the latter's stay at the Baden-Powells' home, Pax Hill. Burges agreed to be secretary for the camp. The camp was held from 16–24 July 1924 at Foxlease. At this time, Burges was Deputy Chief Commissioner for the West of England.

After her marriage, Burges' involvement in Guiding decreased, but she remained interested in the movement.

== See also ==
- Alice Behrens
- Rose Kerr
- Scouting in Avon
