= Martin Kohlroser =

German SS officer (1905–1967)

- Born: 8 January 1905; Munich, Kingdom of Bavaria, German Empire
- Died: 14 November 1967 (aged 62); Munich, Bavaria, West Germany
- Military career
- Allegiance: Nazi Germany
- Branch: Waffen-SS
- Service years: 1930–45
- Rank: SS-Oberführer (Senior Colonel)
- Unit: 34th SS Volunteer Grenadier Division Landstorm Nederland
- Conflicts: Munich Putsch; World War II
- Awards: Blood Order; Iron Cross 1st Class; Iron Cross 2nd Class; German Cross in Gold; Infantry Assault Badge

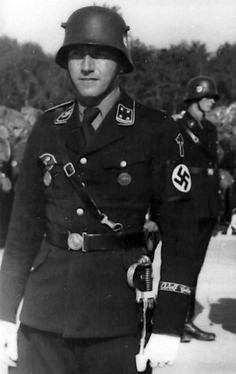
Martin Kohlroser

Martin Kohlroser (8 January 1905 – 14 November 1967) was a SS-Oberführer (Senior Colonel) in the Waffen SS during World War II who was awarded the German Cross in Gold.

== Biography ==
Kohlroser joined the SA in 1923 and participated in the Munich Putsch. On 1 June 1930, he joined the Allgemeine SS (SS-Nr.: 3 149). He was also a member of the NSDAP (NSDAP-Nr.: 371 577).

He was one of the original 117 men selected by Josef Dietrich to form the Headquarters Guard (SS-Stabswache) for Adolf Hitler in March 1933. This unit, forerunner of the Leibstandarte, later became a part of the SS-Verfügungstruppe. During his service in the SS, he would be promoted from a junior officer in the LSSAH, to the rank of SS-Oberführer and would end World War II, in command of the 34th SS Volunteer Grenadier Division Landstorm Nederland.

== Commands ==
- 1st Company LSSAH, (SS-Sturmhauptführer)
- 1st Battalion LSSAH, (SS-Obersturmbannführer)
- 6th SS Gebirgsjäger Battalion, 6th SS Mountain Division Nord, (SS-Standartenführer)
- 40th SS Panzer Grenadier Regiment, 18th SS Volunteer Panzer Grenadier Division Horst Wessel, (SS-Obersturmbannführer)
- 12th SS Gebirgsjäger Regiment Michael Gaissmair, 6th SS Mountain Division Nord, (SS-Obersturmbannführer)
- 21st SS Panzer Grenadier Regiment, 10th SS Panzer Division Frundsberg, (SS-Standartenführer)
- 10th SS Panzer Grenadier Regiment Westland, 5th SS Panzergrenadier Division Wiking, (SS-Standartenführer)
- 1st SS Grenadier Regiment Landstorm Nederland (SS-Standartenführer)
- SS Volunteer Grenadier Brigade Landstorm Nederland (SS-Oberführer)
- 34th SS Volunteer Grenadier Division Landstorm Nederland (SS-Oberführer)
