= Stuart Rawlins (British Army officer, born 1880) =

British Army officer (1880–1927)

Colonel Stuart Rawlins CB CMG DSO
- Born: 11 May 1880
- Died: 16 December 1927 (aged 47)
- Relatives: John Rawlins (son); Stuart Blundell Rawlins (cousin)
- Military career
- Allegiance: United Kingdom
- Branch: British Army
- Service years: 1898–1927
- Rank: Colonel
- Commands: Chemical Warfare Experimental Station, Porton Down
- Conflicts: Second Boer War; First World War
- Awards: Companion of the Order of the Bath; Companion of the Order of St Michael and St George; Distinguished Service Order; Croix de guerre (France); Mentioned in Despatches (10)

Colonel Stuart William Hughes Rawlins, CB, CMG, DSO (11 May 1880 – 16 December 1927) was a British Army officer who led interwar experiments in chemical warfare at Porton Down.

== Early life and family ==
Rawlins was born on 11 May 1880, the son of William Donaldson Rawlins QC and Elizabeth Margaret King. He was educated at Eton College and the Royal Military Academy, Woolwich. He was the cousin of Major General Stuart Blundell Rawlins, and the father of Vice Admiral Sir John Rawlins.

== Military career ==
Rawlins was commissioned into the Royal Marine Artillery on 1 January 1898 and transferred to the Royal Field Artillery on 3 May 1900. He served in the Second Boer War, and was promoted to the rank of lieutenant on 3 April 1901. Following the end of the war in South Africa, he was in October 1902 posted with the 14th Battery at Cawnpore in British India. He was later attached to the 5th (Uganda) Battalion of the King's African Rifles where he saw action against the Yobos tribe. Rawlins was promoted to captain on 1 April 1910 and passed the Staff College, Camberley.

He was promoted to major on 10 October 1914, two months after the British entry into World War I, and brevet lieutenant colonel on 1 January 1916, serving as the brigade major of the artillery of the 7th Division between 1914 and 1915. He was awarded the Distinguished Service Order in 1915. He was awarded the Croix de guerre in 1916. He became a Companion of the Order of St Michael and St George (CMG) in the 1918 New Year Honours. He was mentioned in despatches ten times over the course of the First World War. He was promoted to colonel in 1919 and was the Commandant of the Chemical Warfare Experimental Station at Porton Down from the same year until 1925. He was made a Companion of the Order of the Bath (CB) in the 1924 Birthday Honours in recognition for his work at Porton Down. At the time of his death he was the Commander of the 2nd Division in Aldershot.
