= Stuart Rawlins (British Army officer, born 1897) =

British general

Major-General Stuart Rawlins CB CBE DSO MC*
- Rawlins in 1945
- Born: 18 August 1897; Siston Court, Siston, England
- Died: 2 April 1955 (aged 57)
- Spouse: Olivia Burges
- Relatives: Stuart Rawlins (cousin)
- Military career
- Allegiance: United Kingdom
- Branch: British Army
- Service years: 1916–1951
- Rank: Major-General
- Service number: 15435
- Unit: Royal Artillery
- Commands: 49th (West Riding) Infantry Division (1945); 33rd Field Regiment, Royal Artillery (1942)
- Conflicts: First World War; Second World War
- Awards: Companion of the Order of the Bath; Commander of the Order of the British Empire; Distinguished Service Order; Military Cross & Bar; Mentioned in Despatches

Major-General Stuart Blundell Rawlins, CB, CBE, DSO, MC & Bar (18 August 1897 – 2 April 1955) was a senior British Army officer during the Second World War.

== Early life ==
Rawlins was the son of James Ernest Rawlins of Siston Court in South Gloucestershire.

== Military career ==
Rawlins was commissioned into the Royal Artillery from the Royal Military Academy, Woolwich on 26 May 1916. By the end of the First World War he had been awarded the Military Cross and bar and had been wounded in action.

Between the wars he served with British forces in Malta, England, India and in Africa with the Kings African Rifles. He was a junior staff officer in the War Office and attended the Staff College, Camberley from 1931 to 1932, his fellow students including the likes of Sidney Kirkman, Cameron Nicholson, Brian Horrocks, Manley James, George Symes, Nevil Brownjohn and Frank Simpson.

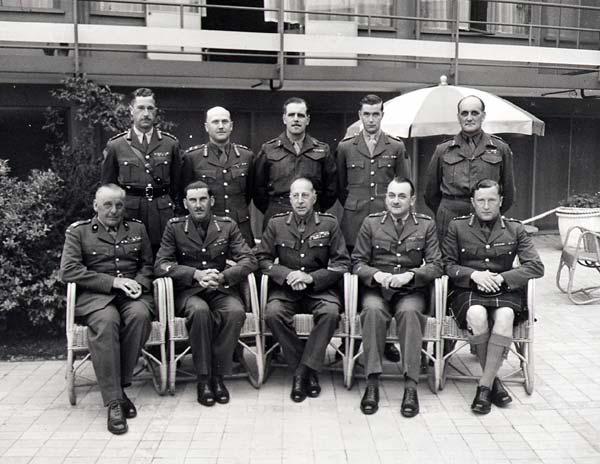
Senior commanders of the First Canadian Army, May 1945. Seated from the left: Stanisław Maczek (Polish Army), Guy Simonds, Harry Crerar, Charles Foulkes, Bert Hoffmeister. Standing from the left: Ralph Keefler, Bruce Matthews, Harry Foster, Robert Moncel (standing in for Chris Vokes), Stuart Rawlins (British Army).

He went to France as GSO 2 RA I Corps, then after returning to UK he went to West Africa as a GSO 1 before returning to the UK to command a regiment, but was soon promoted to become Commander, Royal Artillery in the 3rd Infantry Division. In 1943 he became CCRA XII Corps preparing for the invasion of Europe. In early 1944 he was appointed CCRA of XXX Corps, an assault corps on employed in the Normandy landings. He would often lead his artillery from the front, acting as a spotter and ordering fire from the plane, tank or armoured car from which he was commanding. During the Ardennes offensive he became temporary GOC of 43rd (Wessex) Infantry Division but returned to CCRA to help plan the Operation Veritable offensive into the Reichswald with thirteen divisions and over 1000 guns under overall command.

After the war he became the commander of the 49th (West Riding) Infantry Division in March 1945 before commanding the British Military Mission to Greece. Following this he was appointed Director Royal Artillery, then commander of the British Training Team in Iraq before retiring in 1951.

== Personal life ==
Rawlins married Olivia Burges in 1925. They had two sons, Christopher and Philip, but Burges died giving birth to her third child, a daughter, in August 1930.

Military offices
| Preceded by Gordon MacMillan | GOC 49th (West Riding) Infantry Division; March–August 1945 | Succeeded by Temple Gurdon |
