= Conscription Crisis of 1944 =

Canadian political controversy

- Date: 1944
- Cause: Conscription in Canada for the Second World War
- Motive: Low troop numbers
- Participants: Parliament of Canada
- Outcome: 1945 Canadian federal election

The Conscription Crisis of 1944 was a political and military crisis following the introduction of forced military service for men in Canada during World War II. It was similar to the Conscription Crisis of 1917, but not as politically damaging.

== Background ==
Canadian prime minister William Lyon Mackenzie King had been haunted by the way the Conscription Crisis of 1917 had fractured the Liberal Party between its English-Canadian and French-Canadian members. King, who experienced the split first-hand, was determined to avoid another such split. In 1922, during the Chanak Crisis, when the United Kingdom almost went to war with Turkey, King had first asserted that Canada would not automatically go to war as part of the British Empire if the United Kingdom did, saying he would consult the Canadian Parliament first and presumably declare neutrality if the House of Commons were unwilling to go to war with Turkey. Though there were several reasons for King's reluctance to go to war with Turkey, at least one was the memory of how badly the First World War had strained Canadian domestic unity.

During the 1930s, Mackenzie King had displayed what the Canadian historian Colonel John A. English called "an abiding aversion to conscription" and "an apparently unshakable conviction in the efficacy of appeasement", regarding another world war as "the ultimate catastrophe" for which no price was too high to avoid. In 1935, King had been opposed to sanctions on Italy for invading Ethiopia; in 1936, he stated that Canada would not take part if Britain decided to take military action in response to the German remilitarization of the Rhineland; and in 1938, he had warmly supported the Munich Agreement as the necessary price for peace. King had laid down defence spending priorities in April 1939 that declared the Royal Canadian Air Force (RCAF) was to be the main service, the Royal Canadian Navy (RCN) the secondary service and the Canadian Militia the last on the list, as he wanted to avoid fighting another land war, which was likely to cause heavy losses.

Canada declared war on Germany on September 10, 1939, and sent one division to Europe, which did not have an opportunity to engage in combat before France was defeated by Germany. As a war leader, King sought to avoid repeating what he regarded as the mistakes of his Conservative predecessor Sir Robert Borden in the First World War, which meant avoiding conscription, and King initially attempted to limit Canada's participation in the war solely to the British Commonwealth Air Training Plan (BCATP). King had described the BCATP in a statement as "Canada's most effective contribution to the war effort", and privately complained that the British should not have asked for a division for Europe before approaching him with the BCATP, as he would never have sent the 1st Canadian Division to Britain if he could have settled only for the BCATP. As King saw it, "a big RCAF could never lead to conscription".

King feared the civil and political unrest that had occurred during World War I, and also hoped to defeat nationalist Quebec Premier Maurice Duplessis. Thus when Duplessis called a snap election in September 1939 to seek a mandate to oppose the war, King pledged that same month not to introduce overseas conscription for the duration of the war. Duplessis's decision to dissolve the assembly on 25 September 1939 to seek a mandate to oppose the war created panic in Ottawa, with King calling Duplessis "diabolic" and a "little Hitler" in his diary, believing Duplessis's aim was to provoke such a crisis between French Canada and English Canada that Quebec would leave the Confederation.

During the 1939 Quebec election campaign, the Dominion government made an unprecedented intervention in a provincial election to defeat the Union Nationale government and ensure the victory of the pro-war Quebec Liberals under Adélard Godbout; all the resources of the Dominion government were thrown behind the provincial Liberals. All of the Dominion cabinet ministers representing ridings in Quebec threatened to resign if Duplessis was re-elected, claiming that no one would be left to stand up for Quebec in the cabinet if conscription become an issue again. Duplessis was one of Quebec's ablest politicians, a charismatic, colourful demagogue who preached a mixture of Catholic conservatism and Quebec nationalism. During the election campaign, the War Measures Act was used to stop Duplessis from speaking on the radio.

It soon became evident that Duplessis's alcoholism was out of control. He ran an inept campaign, appearing visibly drunk at numerous campaign rallies as he delivered rambling speeches denouncing the war, which were most notable for his slurred words and lack of lucidity. By electing Godbout as premier on 25 October 1939, there was an understanding in Quebec that the reward for voting Duplessis out would be no overseas conscription. Many Canadians supported Mackenzie King's pledge, even as it became obvious the war would not end quickly.

As in the First World War, young French Canadians joined the few traditional French-speaking regiments of the Canadian army, such as the Regular Army Royal 22^{e} Régiment, and several Militia regiments that were mobilized. In the infantry, barracks life and most training was in French and only the command and radio language was in English.

In the rest of the military, however, similar French-speaking units were not created. Among the justifications for this policy were the predominance of the radio, and the fact that technical instruction was only available in English. The 12th Armoured Regiment, originally mobilized by the Francophone Three Rivers Regiment (Tank) militia unit, was reorganized and fought as an English-speaking unit. Many French-speaking soldiers were sidetracked in the process. One of the most famous was Jean-Victor Allard, who demanded a transfer from the Three Rivers Regiment to the infantry; he went on to become a brigade commander in Northwest Europe and then in Korea, command a British division in NATO and subsequently become Chief of the Defence Staff of the Canadian Armed Forces, where he was pleased to create the first French-speaking brigade.

While units such as the Royal 22^{e} Régiment, Les Fusiliers Mont-Royal, the Régiment de la Chaudière and the Régiment de Maisonneuve all had outstanding records during World War II, some feel that if they had been grouped in the same brigade (as French Canadians had requested, and as currently exists in the Canadian Armed Forces), it could have become a focus of pride for French Canada, encouraging the war effort and political support in Quebec. These units were, however, distributed among the various English-speaking divisions of the Canadian Army overseas. Historian J. L. Granatstein, in his book The Generals, suggests that a shortage of French-speaking staff trained officers meant that any attempt to create an entire Francophone brigade would have likely ended in failure.

From the beginning, acceptance of French-speaking units was greater in Canada during World War II than World War I. In 1914, the drive to create the 22nd Infantry Battalion (French-Canadian) had necessitated large rallies of French Canadians and political pressure to overcome Minister Sam Hughes' abhorrence of the idea. But during World War II, greater acceptance of French-Canadian units, as well as informal use of their language, lessened the ferocity of Quebec's resistance to the war effort.

Opposition to conscription was not limited to Quebec. In British Columbia, where alarm over the "Yellow Peril" was a major issue, many were opposed to conscription, fearful that conscripting of Chinese-Canadians and Japanese-Canadians would lead to Asian-Canadian demands for the right to vote, to which the white population of British Columbia was adamantly opposed. Meanwhile, many on the political left had profound misgivings about the injustice of the war, and the attitude of the Co-operative Commonwealth Federation (CCF) towards the war has been described as "ambivalent".

== The Zombies ==
In June 1940, the government adopted conscription for home service in The National Resources Mobilization Act (NRMA), which allowed the government to register men and women and move them into jobs considered necessary for wartime production. The act also allowed for conscription for the defence of Canada, but did not allow conscripts to be deployed for overseas service. French-Canadian nationalist mayor of Montreal Camillien Houde gave a speech urging all French-Canadian men not to register under the NRMA. The Dominion government used the suspension of habeas corpus under the War Measures Act to have the RCMP arrest Houde, who was held without charge until 1944. From 1940 onward, Defence Minister James Ralston and Navy minister Angus MacDonald were seen as the advocates of the armed forces in the cabinet, favouring winning the war even at the price of domestic disunity, in opposition to King, who argued victory could not come at the cost of domestic unity.

After adoption of the NRMA, men who refused to "go active" were derisively called "Zombies", both in Canada and overseas. The term was used because soldiers who could not fight in the war were regarded by some as the reanimated corpses from Haitian mythology who were neither alive nor dead but somewhere in between. The Zombies were widely reviled by those who had volunteered for overseas service and referred to as cowards. The Canadian military was divided into two classes: "A" class servicemembers who volunteered to go overseas, and the "R" class servicemembers known as Zombies. At training camps, officers and NCOs constantly belittled, insulted and humiliated the Zombies to pressure them to "go active", making for tense relationships at the best of times.

King's efforts to keep the military out of action for as long as possible caused much dismay among more hawkish Canadians anxious to see Canada become more involved. The Royal Canadian Legion issued its manifesto, "A Call for Total War", endorsed by some 500 civic groups across English Canada. Ontario Premier Mitchell Hepburn and Premier of New Brunswick John B. McNair both demanded overseas conscription in speeches attacking King. A Gallup poll in November 1941 showed 61% of Canadians satisfied with the war effort, but 60% who also wanted conscription for overseas service. On 13 November 1941, King's old nemesis from the 1920s, former prime minister Arthur Meighen, became leader of the Conservative Party. His predecessor, "Fighting Bob" Manion, had supported King's conscription policies, but Meighen's call for "total war", including sending the Zombies overseas, was the centerpiece of his criticism of King. Meighen and King's rivalry was one of the most famous in Canadian political history; both men passionately hated one another, and Meighen travelled across the country accusing King of not doing everything within his power to win the war.

After the disaster of the Battle of Hong Kong in December 1941 in which two Canadian battalions were lost, a political firestorm erupted in Canada. George A. Drew, leader of the Ontario Conservative Party, urged the Canadian people to "face the shameful truth", that the two battalions of badly trained men sent to Hong Kong were a sign of the failure of King's policies and of the need for conscription for overseas service. By the end of 1941, the armies of the United Kingdom, United States, Soviet Union and other allies were all fighting in various theatres of war, while the Canadian Army sat idle, guarding the UK against the unlikely threat of German invasion. By the end of December 1941, the Royal Canadian Air Force, which had started fighting in the Battle of Britain in the summer of 1940, had lost 1,199 men, and the Royal Canadian Navy had lost 439. In Hong Kong, the Canadian Army had lost 290 men, with 487 wounded and the rest held prisoner by the Japanese under horrific conditions, a majority dying in captivity.

== The Plebiscite of 1942 ==
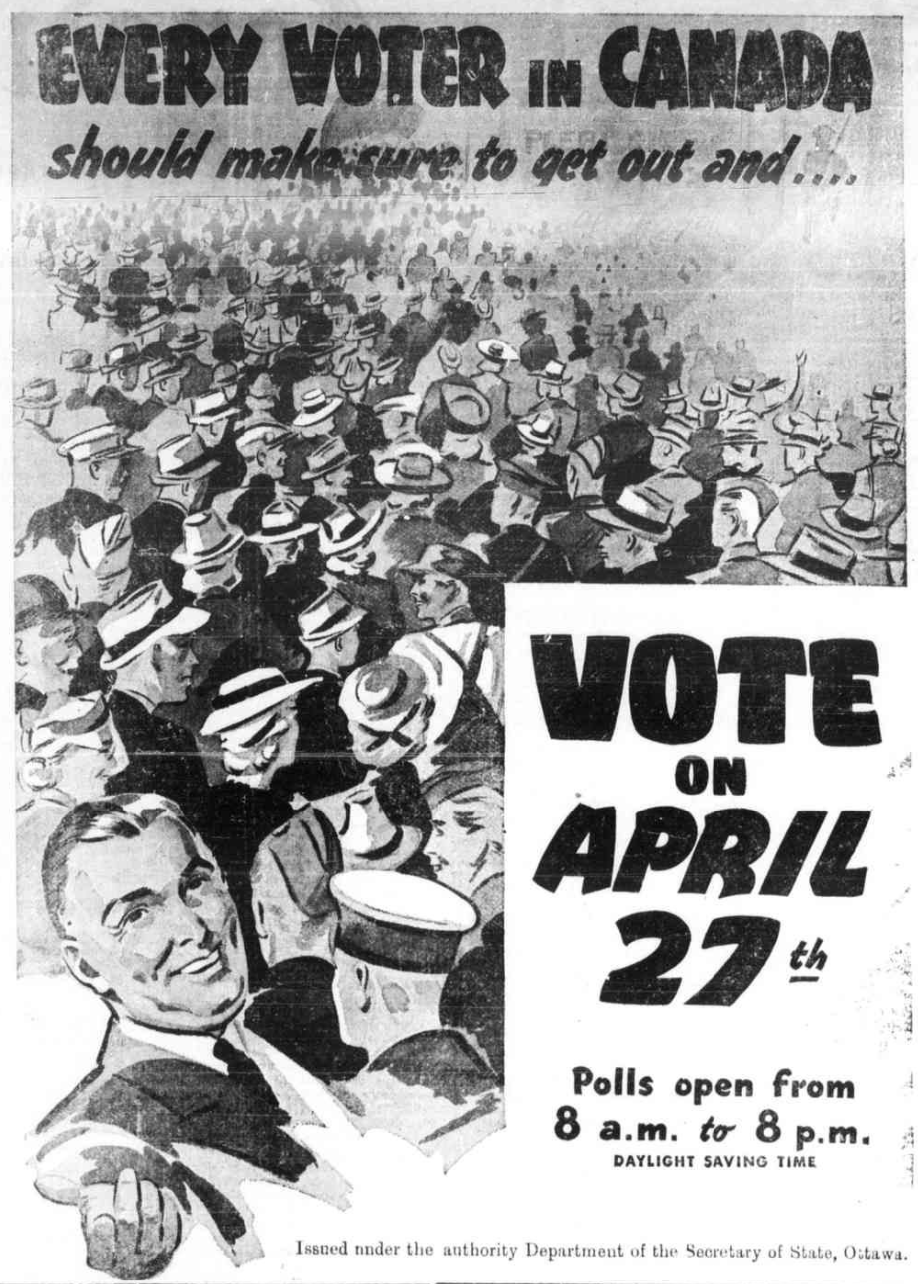
Advertisement soliciting votes for the 1942 Canadian conscription plebiscite

By 1941, there were enough Canadian volunteers to form five overseas divisions. The Conservatives were pressuring King to advise the Governor General to introduce overseas conscription. The loss of the two battalions in Hong Kong had shocked the Canadian public, which demanded that Canada do more to win the war. Arthur Meighen's attacks on King started to resonate, and in January 1942, Meighen resigned his Senate seat to enter the House of Commons via a by-election in the York South riding of Ontario, backed by anti-King Liberal Premier of Ontario Mitchell Hepburn and a "Committee of 200" representing 200 of Toronto's most influential citizens. The Liberals did not run a candidate due to a convention that the Leader of the Opposition be permitted entry to the House, however, tacit support was given to CCF candidate Joseph W. Noseworthy. Historian Frank Underhill, who normally worked for the Liberals, wrote Noseworthy's speeches. As the acerbic, sharp-tongued Meighen tended to get the better of King in debates, the Prime Minister feared his archenemy's return to the Commons, and attempted to rob Meighen of his signature issue by announcing a referendum to release him from his September 1939 promise that there would be no overseas conscription. Arthur Meighen was ultimately defeated by Noseworthy in the February 9, 1942 by-election.

In an "off-the-record" interview with two journalists from the Winnipeg Free Press in February 1942, King said that the purpose of the Canadian expeditionary force then training in the United Kingdom was only to defend Britain in the event of a German invasion, and that he would not be sending the five expeditionary force divisions to the Middle East, as the British were requesting. King told Grant Dexter of The Winnipeg Free Press on 28 February 1942 that the purpose of the Canadian Army in Britain was "to defend the heart of the Empire", and criticized Ralston for saying in the House of Commons that he wanted "to build up a strong striking force in Britain because we would ultimately use Britain as the springboard for our thrust on the continent". King told Dexter that "the trouble was with Ralston and the general staff. Ralston stood up for the generals, fought the cabinet on their behalf". King expressed the view that Ralston was too easily influenced by the generals and that "Generals are almost invariably wrong". In the same interview, King stated his belief that Japanese would invade British Columbia "just as soon as the Japs could muster the men and material".

In early 1942, Japanese successes in the Asia-Pacific theatre had led to widespread fears of their invading British Columbia. But while the Japanese did plan to annex the province once the war was won, in the spring of 1942 they were largely preoccupied with plans for the invasion of Australia and Hawaii, and the continuing war with China. Responding to racist hysteria that Japanese-Canadians were a fifth column loyal to Japan who would soon wage terrorist campaigns against whites, the King government interned all Japanese-Canadians. This was despite RCMP reports to the government that there was no need for internment, and that most Japanese-Canadians were loyal to Canada. The same fears of a Japanese invasion led King to create two divisions, the 6th and the 8th, largely composed of Zombies, to guard the Pacific coast. Another Zombie division, the 7th, was created to guard the Atlantic coast against a German invasion, just to show that the government was not indifferent to the Maritime provinces, through the military had advised the government there was little danger of a Japanese invasion and even less of a German one.

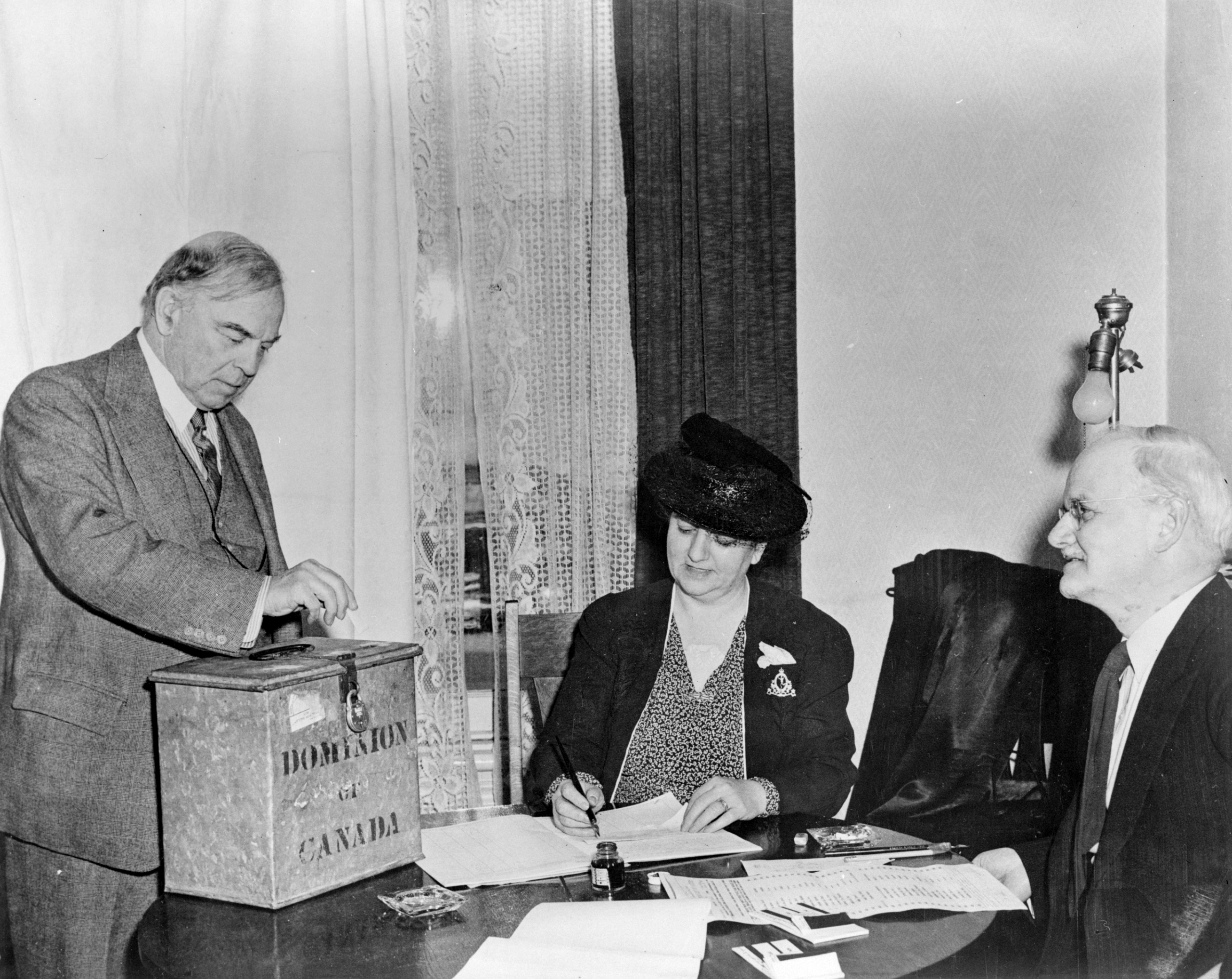
William Mackenzie King voting in the plebiscite on the introduction of conscription for overseas military service

On 27 April 1942, a plebiscite was held on the question, "Are you in favour of releasing the Government from any obligations arising out of any past commitments restricting the methods of raising men for military service?" In Quebec, the Ligue pour la Défense du Canada was founded to campaign for the "No" side under the slogan Jamais, Jamais...a dit M. Lapointe, a reference to King's Quebec lieutenant, Ernest Lapointe, who had died of cancer in November 1941 and was fiercely opposed to sending the Zombies overseas. The Ligue pour la Défense du Canada united the entire spectrum of political opinion in Quebec; some of its most effective speakers were André Laurendeau, Henri Bourassa, Jean Drapeau and a young Pierre Trudeau. La Ligue pour la Défense du Canada professed to speak for all of Canada in opposing conscription, but its French-Canadian nationalist message had little appeal outside of French Canada. Reflecting the quasi-fascist mood of the nationalist intelligentsia of Quebec, speakers for the League often expressed approval of Vichy France, citing its Révolution nationale as a model for Quebec, and expressed a "disturbing anti-Semitic tendency". One rally for the League in Montreal ended with speakers blaming Canada's Jewish community for dragging the country into a war with Nazi Germany that did not concern French-Canadians. The event almost degenerated into a pogrom, with attendees beating up Jews on the streets of Montreal and smashing windows of Jewish shops; only the prompt intervention of the Montreal police put an end to the violence.

The plebiscite was supported by most English Canadians as well as the banned Communist Party of Canada, which established Tim Buck "Yes" Committees to campaign for a yes vote. Across Canada, 64.5% voted in favour of conscription, including 83% of English Canadians. The proposal hardly received any support from French Canadians, especially in Quebec, where anti-conscription groups (including one led by Henri Bourassa, the most vocal opponent of conscription in 1917) convinced 72.9% of voters to oppose the plebiscite. In addition to Quebec, six largely French-Canadian ridings in New Brunswick and Ontario also voted "No", as did several German-speaking and Ukrainian-speaking ridings, including Vegreville, Alberta, and Rosthern, Saskatchewan. King, who had expected all nine provinces to vote yes, was shocked by Quebec's "No" vote, and explained that henceforward his policy would be "Not necessarily conscription, but conscription if necessary". The government then passed Bill 80, repealing the sections of the NRMA that did not allow for overseas conscription. Bill 80 passed the House of Commons by 158 votes to 58. However, many Canadians still did not support immediate conscription; there were a few riots in Montreal, though these were not on the same scale as the 1917 and 1918 riots.

Following the plebiscite, Public Works Minister Pierre Joseph Arthur Cardin quit the King cabinet to protest the possibility that the "Zombies" might be sent overseas. A number of other Quebec Liberal MPs also left the party in 1942 over the conscription issue, many of whom joined the Bloc populaire canadien when it was formed that fall to campaign against the government. The defence minister, Colonel James Ralston, resigned in protest over King's unwillingness to send the Zombies overseas, but King refused to accept his resignation.

== The Aleutians and Italian campaigns ==
In his Christmas broadcast in 1942, former Conservative prime minister R.B. Bennett sarcastically noted that this was the fourth Christmas in a row that the Canadian Army was sitting in Britain doing nothing, and that the only land battles that Canada had fought to date were Hong Kong and Dieppe, both of which were defeats. During the Operation Spartan wargame in March 1943, General Andrew McNaughton, commanding the First Canadian Army, had been badly defeated and was judged unfit to command an army in the field. The wargame umpires criticized McNaughton for leaving his headquarters to supervise the building of a bridge while his supply lines were caught up in a huge traffic jam. After Operation Spartan, the British strongly pressured the Canadians to remove McNaughton before he could lead the First Canadian Army into a real defeat in a battle.

King had tried to keep the Canadian military out of action to avoid casualties that might require a difficult decision on overseas conscription, but in the spring of 1943, with the Allies clearly winning the war, he was seized with the fear that the war might end with Canada winning no battles on land, something certain to hurt the Liberals in post-war elections. Accordingly, King ordered that the 1st Canadian Infantry Division, which had been sent to Britain in 1939, be included in Operation Husky, the Allied invasion of Sicily. General McNaughton was not keen on having a division being taken from his command, but was promised that 1st Division would return to Britain after Sicily was taken. The 13th brigade, from one of the three "home defence" divisions in Canada, was sent to the Aleutian Islands Campaign in 1943 (the islands were technically North American soil and thus deployment there was not considered "overseas"). By this time, there were 34,000 soldiers, mostly Zombies, guarding the coast of British Columbia against possible Japanese invasion, and to dispel criticism that such a huge force could be more profitably deployed to Europe, King wanted the Zombies to see action. Other than officers and NCOs, these divisions in British Columbia were made up largely of conscripts, and desertions were noted before embarkation. Canadian conscripts deployed in the Aleutian Islands Campaign were pointedly issued American helmets. When the 13th Brigade landed on Kiska on 15 August 1943, the Canadians discovered that the Japanese had already left, and the island was empty. The only struggle the 13th Brigade had to face during its six-month stay on Kiska was a fight with taxmen over the question of whether they were overseas or not, as the former meant exemption from paying taxes. Servicemembers used the fact that they were west of the International Date Line to argue that they were in fact in Asia, making them deployed overseas. The Revenue department won.

Believing in Winston Churchill's repeated statements that Italy was the "soft underbelly of Europe" and that the Italian campaign would be easy, King decided in the fall of 1943 to keep the 1st Division, now operating as part of the British Eighth Army, in the Italian campaign and send it to mainland Italy. King also decided to send the 5th Canadian Armoured Division and 1st Canadian Armoured Brigade there, where they formed the I Canadian Corps of the Eighth Army. Despite Churchill's promises and King's hopes, Italy proved to be anything but a "soft underbelly". The mountains in Italy favoured defensive operations, and the German military made expert use of them to mount a bitter defensive campaign that took a heavy toll on the Allies. McNaughton, for his part, had strongly protested against losing the I Canadian Corps to the Eighth Army, greatly preferring to keep the I and II Canadian corps together in the First Canadian Army, and made increasingly furious remarks on the issue. Defence Minister Ralston had McNaughton removed on the spurious grounds of ill health in December 1943; historian Desmond Morton noted that McNaughton appeared very healthy when he returned to Canada later that month.

== Introduction of conscription ==
There was an ethnic dimension to volunteering for the war. Historian Jack Granatstein noted that in both world wars, the Canadians most likely to volunteer to fight overseas were those who identified most strongly with the British Empire. Granatstein noted that in the First World War, British immigrants were disproportionately over-represented in the ranks of the Canadian Expeditionary Force; two-thirds of those who volunteered in 1914 were British-born, and an "extraordinary" 228,170 of the 470,000 young male British immigrants in Canada volunteered for the war. Conscription was introduced in 1917, and it was not until the following year that the majority of the CEF became Canadian-born. The same pattern repeated itself in the Second World War, with the difference being that this time, the majority of the Anglo-Canadians volunteering to fight overseas were Canadian-born rather than British-born. In contrast, during both wars, it was Canadians who least identified with the British Empire that were least likely to volunteer to fight overseas.

Granatstein wrote about World War II enlistment:

"If French-speaking Canadians enlisted well below their share of the population, as they did, and if ten percent of the total Canadian population joined one of the armed services, then Anglo-Canadians must have enlisted in higher numbers than all or almost all ethnic or religious communities. In other words, Canadians of British origin made up the lion's share of enlistments, exactly as in the Great War, though now most were Canadian-born."

Brigadier W.H.S. Macklin, an officer tasked with "converting" Zombies into "going active", wrote in May 1944 that he experienced almost total failure persuading French-Canadians to do so, adding: "The great majority [of NRMA soldiers in other units] are of non-British origin—German, Italian, and Slavic nationalities predominating. Moreover, most of them come from farms. They are of deplorably low education, know almost nothing of Canadian or British history and in fact are typical European peasants...." Granatstein wrote that the research supported Macklin's conclusions, if not his commentary. However, the Army's need for men to "go active" by volunteering for overseas duty led to the ending of the whites-only policy for officers. About 500 Chinese-Canadians enlisted in the military, and unlike in the First World War, some were able to obtain officers' commissions, though this was not easy.

After the Italian campaign in 1943 and Normandy invasion in 1944, the lack of volunteers meant that Canada faced troop shortages. The offensive against the Gustav Line in Italy (Battle of Ortona in December 1943), Gothic Line in Italy (Battle of Monte Cassino) and the Normandy campaign, especially the battles of Caen and the Falaise Gap, had decimated the Canadian infantry. However, General Kenneth Stuart, chief of the Canadian Military Headquarters in London, had downplayed Canadian losses in France and Italy throughout the summer of 1944, only starting to hint at the truth in late August. By late summer, numbers of new recruits were insufficient to replace war casualties in Europe, particularly among the infantry. On 22 November 1944, King's Liberal government decided to send to Europe a single contingent of 16,000 home defence draftees trained as infantry men.

Further contributing to King's difficulties was the return of Duplessis to power in the Quebec election of 8 August 1944. Duplessis won the election by appealing to antisemitic prejudices in Quebec. He claimed, in a violently antisemitic speech, that the Dominion government and the government of Premier Godbout had made a secret deal with the "International Zionist Brotherhood" to settle 100,000 Jewish refugees left homeless by the Holocaust in Quebec after the war, in exchange for campaign contributions to both the federal and provincial Liberal parties. By contrast, Duplessis claimed that he was not taking any money from the Jews, and that if he were elected premier, he would stop this plan to bring Jewish refugees to Quebec. Though Duplessis's story about plans to settle 100,000 Jewish refugees in Quebec was entirely untrue, it was widely believed in Quebec and propelled him to victory. The return to power of Duplessis, a French-Canadian nationalist opposed to both the war and to sending the Zombies overseas, made King more reluctant to have the Zombies fight at the exact moment the Canadian Army in Europe was suffering from major manpower shortages.

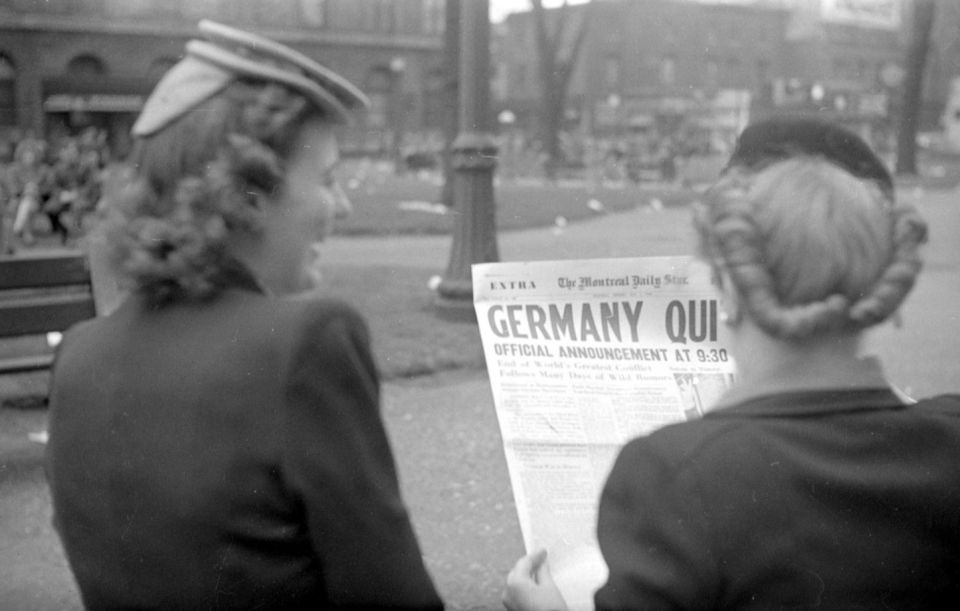
The Montreal Daily Star announces the surrender of Germany, May 7, 1945

The crisis began on 19 September 1944, when Major Conn Smythe, owner of the Toronto Maple Leafs, who had been invalided out of the Army following wounds received in France, issued a statement published on the front page in The Globe and Mail. He charged that infantry replacements in the First Canadian Army were "green, inexperienced and poorly trained", as the Army was hastily sending cooks and clerks to replace killed and wounded soldiers. Due to their inexperience, the replacements were in turn usually swiftly killed or wounded themselves. Smythe said that the solution was to send the Zombies overseas, as they had been training for the last four years or so. Smythe's ownership of one of the country's only two NHL teams meant he was a celebrity in Canada, and his letter attracted considerable media attention. Conservative Ontario Premier George Drew, who was already looking forward to becoming prime minister, endorsed Smythe's claims.

In response, Defence Minister James Ralston decided to personally investigate reports of major infantry shortages by visiting Northwest Europe and Italy. Upon his return to Ottawa, he informed the Cabinet that the situation was far worse than he had been led to believe; front-line infantry regiments were so short of manpower that wounded men were being pulled out of hospitals and sent back to the front lines. The manpower shortages were especially serious in French-speaking regiments, due to a lack of volunteers.

Further contributing to the crisis were heavy losses being taken by the First Canadian Army in the Battle of the Scheldt, the most difficult and bloody fought by the Canadians in northwest Europe. In October 1944, the Black Watch and Royal Hamilton Light Infantry regiments both suffered 50% casualty rates fighting on the Scheldt river banks. As more and more Canadians were killed or wounded during the battle without anyone to replace them, the survivors were required to do more with less, inflicting major psychological strain on frontline infantry units. Many soldiers were psychologically broken by the bloody fighting during the offensive, falling victim to battle exhaustion and refusing to move, making manpower shortages even worse. Such were the shortages that the Army refused to provide proper treatment for men suffering from battle exhaustion, allowing only the shortest possible period of rest and treatment before sending them back to the front, a policy criticized by the Army's psychiatrists as inhumane. One officer, Major Ben Dunkelman of the Queen's Own Rifles Regiment, wrote at the time: "We knew why leaves were so scarce. Thanks to Prime Minister Mackenzie King's handling of the Conscription issue at home". Another serving in Italy, Brigadier Bill Murphy, wrote to his wife: "I personally will never cast another Liberal vote as long as King as anything to do with the party. Of the armies in Italy, only that of Canada has no provisions for home leave", the reason for which was "that there are no men to replace them-except the Zombie Army. And to preserve the Zombies' precious skins the volunteers just have to take it".

On 13 October 1944, Ralston telegraphed King from Europe: "I regret to say that conditions and prospects of which I have learned will I fear necessitate reassessment in light of the future particularly regarding infantry involving, I fear, grave responsibilities". King wrote in his diary that Ralston's cable was "an intimation that he was coming back with the intention of making proposals which may involve the whole question of conscription". King added that sending any conscripts overseas would be a "criminal thing" that would cause a Canadian civil war, and lead to the United States stepping in to annex Canada. On 19 October, Ralston formally informed King of the need for more men in Europe and on 24 October, the matter was first discussed at the Cabinet, where the defence minister said: "I feel that there is no alternative but for me to recommend the extension of service of NRMA personnel overseas".

Ralston informed the Cabinet that in order to continue combat operations, the overseas Canadian Army needed 15,000 new infantrymen immediately, and that the only way to get these replacements was to draw from the 60,000 Zombies guarding both the Pacific coast against an unlikely Japanese invasion and the Atlantic coast against an equally unlikely German invasion. Ralston argued that the only other way to prevent the Canadian Army from bleeding to death was to pull it out of the front, which would have been humiliating for the Canadian people. King objected to Ralston's assessment, saying that the imminent Allied victory precluded the need to send the Zombies overseas, and that he could not care less about the manpower shortage problems in the overseas Canadian Army. The cabinet was badly divided on the issue; some ministers supported Ralston, while others were behind King.

An additional concern for King was that Ralston was from Nova Scotia, as were Angus MacDonald, junior Defence minister in charge of the navy, and Finance Minister J.L. Ilsley. The three politicians from Nova Scotia were close friends; fellow minister C.D. Howe commented that "the three Nova Scotians were a sub-cabinet in themselves". King worried that if three leading ministers from Nova Scotia resigned together in protest against his conscription policies, they might topple his government. Thus much of King's time in October 1944 was spent charming MacDonald and Ilsley in an attempt to break up the Nova Scotia triumvirate. King felt that MacDonald disliked him for vetoing his plan to send Royal Canadian Navy ships to the Indian Ocean since it would mean having Canadian ships under British command. But he discovered that MacDonald was both more conciliatory than he expected and concerned about alienating French Canada from English Canada. King wrote in his diary that "Angus said he saw the difficulties. Was much concerned about everything himself, but Ralston was hard to deal with". MacDonald tended to favor enacting conscription if it was necessary to win the war, but he was widely viewed as a possible future prime minister and wanted to avoid another 1917-style split in the Liberal Party, making him ambivalent about where he stood.

King's first attempt at a solution was to ask the British prime minister Winston Churchill for a statement that Canada had done more than enough to win the war, and that sending the Zombies overseas was unnecessary, a request Churchill refused. King's next move was to fire General Stuart for underreporting Canadian losses in Europe, thus providing King with a scapegoat but not really resolving the problem. King noted that Ralston and the other ministers who supported sending the Zombies overseas were all from the right wing of the Liberal Party and had also opposed his plans for a postwar welfare state, which he decided was evidence of a "reactionary conspiracy" to bring him down. King was convinced that there was a plot to "get me out" and that Ralston had provoked the crisis to make himself Prime Minister.

King's paranoia about a plot to force him out was sparked by the fact that the Canadian military had 1.1 million people, out of a total population of 11 million, serving in its ranks, of whom half had "gone active". This made the Army's inability to find 15,000 men simply inconceivable to King. Historian Desmond Morton wrote that King's rationale was legitimate, but the answers were far more complex than a conspiracy of right-wing cabinet ministers working to oust him in conjunction with the military. The reasons behind the shortages of infantry were the following:

- The Royal Canadian Air Force, the most glamorous and relatively luxurious of the three services, had attracted far more volunteers than it needed. The RCAF used the volunteers for its gargantuan air training program, taking away men who could have been used for the Army.
- In 1943, over the objections of McNaughton and the rest of the generals, King had sent the I Canadian Corps to Italy while keeping the II Canadian Corps in Britain, thereby requiring two different administrative organizations that tied up considerable manpower.
- In the summer of 1944, the I Canadian Corps was thrown into an offensive against the Gothic Line without any troops to provide a diversionary attack, and took very heavy losses, right after the bloody Battle of the Liri Valley in May 1944.
- In spite of having five years to prepare for combat, the II Canadian Corps was not as well trained as it could have been when it was sent to France, and thereby suffered heavy casualties.
- Despite expectations, Field Marshal Sir Bernard Montgomery's 21st Army Group had failed to win the war in 1944 as he had promised, and by launching Operation Market Garden, he had allowed the Germans to move the 15th Army into the upper banks of the river Scheldt to make the port of Antwerp unusable. As long as Antwerp was closed, the Allies lacked the necessary deepwater port near to Germany to support an offensive into the Reich. By not securing the Scheldt in September 1944 as Montgomery could have, and instead launching the ill-timed Battle of Arnhem, the third-largest port in Europe remained closed, causing enough logistical problems to shut down the entire Allied advance. This ensured that none of the Allied armies, from the North Sea to Switzerland, could advance deep into Germany in the fall of 1944, pushing the end of the war into 1945. Morton noted that if Montgomery had decided to forego Operation Market Garden and instead cleared the Scheldt, Antwerp would have been opened earlier, enabling Allied offensives into Germany and potentially ending the war. Opening Antwerp required that the II Canadian Corps fight the very bloody and difficult Battle of the Scheldt, in which Montgomery for a time placed the First Canadian Army last in supply allocations, forcing the Canadians to ration ammunition in the Scheldt.
- The Army's casualty replacement system was based upon the British one developed in North Africa, where the Luftwaffe often struck well beyond the front lines, leading to more or less equal number of replacements needed among the infantry, armour, artillery, service corps, engineers, etc. By contrast, in northwest Europe, the Luftwaffe was no longer an effective force, and the Canadian infantry took almost all of the casualties.
- Knowing what King had wanted to hear, General Kenneth Stuart had suppressed news of mounting losses in Europe. This allowed for a mood of complacency to emerge in Ottawa; King was told there were enough volunteers to replace all of the losses in the European theatre.

The French-Canadian ministers in the Cabinet, and Quebec in general, did not trust Defence Minister Ralston, and King felt it was politically sensible to replace him as Minister of National Defence with the anti-conscription General Andrew McNaughton in November 1944. When the Cabinet met on the morning of 1 November 1944, King, who had only informed his Quebec lieutenant Louis St. Laurent in advance, suddenly announced that he now accepted Ralston's resignation, which had been submitted back in April 1942. Ralston had been effectively fired as defence minister. King took a gamble by firing Ralston, because other right-wing, pro-conscription Liberal cabinet ministers like C. D. Howe and J. L. Ilsley could have resigned in protest, thereby splitting the Liberal Party like the Grits in 1917. Much to King's relief, Ralston walked out of the cabinet room and no one followed him. Ralston's ally, Navy Minister Angus Macdonald, ripped pieces of paper in frustration, but remained seated with the rest of the cabinet.

Though asked to resign as commander of the First Canadian Army in 1943 after his disastrous Operation Spartan wargame performance, General McNaughton was a popular and well-respected war hero (the official story had been that he had retired for health reasons). McNaughton was opposed to sending the Zombies overseas, and from King's viewpoint, he had an additional benefit: he and Ralson hated one another. McNaughton believed he could persuade a sufficient number of Zombies to fight overseas through the sheer force of his personality, a policy that failed. One Zombie was quoted in the press as saying, "If Mackenzie King wants me to go overseas, he'll have to send me. I'm damned if I'll volunteer to help out this government". McNaughton was unable to produce large numbers of volunteers for the army, though there were numerous volunteers for the navy and air force. Historians Jack Granatstein and Desmond Morton noted that "news of Ralston's sacking put the conscription crisis on the front pages in screaming headlines. To King's horror and to McNaughton's distress, the publicity created a firestorm of reaction against the once-popular general. Audiences booed and jeered when he tried to rally the country behind the no-conscription policy". In Vancouver, General George Pearkes, commanding officer of the Pacific command, called a press conference to explain why the Army was asking the Zombies to "go active", which led King, who distrusted all of his generals, to write in his diary: "These men in uniform have no right to speak in ways that will turn people against civil power".

Members of King's cabinet threatened to resign and bring down the government if the Zombies were not sent overseas. J. L. Ilsley, C. D. Howe, Angus Macdonald, Colin W. G. Gibson, Thomas Crerar, and William Pate Mulock all threatened resignation if King persisted with his current policies. On the morning of 22 November 1944, General John Carl Murchie told McNaughton that his policies had failed and that hardly any Zombies were volunteering to "go active", which McNaughton recalled "was like a blow to the stomach". Later on 22 November 1944, McNaughton telephoned King to say, as the latter wrote in his diary, "The Headquarters staff here had all advised him that the voluntary system would not get the men...It was the most serious advice that could be tended". King added that at once "there came to mind the statement that I had made to Parliament in June [1942] about the action the government would necessarily take if we were agreed that the time had come when conscription was necessary". But King chose to misrepresent McNaughton's statement as some sort of military coup d'état, which in his own words were variously a "general's revolt", a "palace revolution", and "the surrender of civil government to the military". Morton wrote that Murchie's statement about the failure of McNaughton's recruiting drive was "irrefutable", adding that "It was no act of mutiny to tell the truth. Yet to King, the notion of a 'general's revolt' was too useful to ignore. It fitted his view of the military. It superseded the mutiny that really mattered – the imminent resignation of the pro-conscription ministers. It would frighten the anti-conscriptists". King's Quebec lieutenant Louis St. Laurent chose to accept "this fiction" that King was being forced by the military to send the Zombies overseas against his will, but Air Minister Charles "Chubby" Power would not, resigning in protest at the violation of the government's promises to the people of Quebec.

King finally agreed to a one-time levy of 17,000 NRMA conscripts for overseas service in November 1944. Many of the Zombies deserted rather than fight in the war. General McNaughton, never having been elected to the House of Commons, on 23 November 1944, had to go to the bar of the House of Commons to announce that 16,000 Zombies would go overseas if the House gave its approval. When word of the decision reached soldiers stationed in Terrace, British Columbia, it resulted in the short-lived Terrace Mutiny. A brigade of Zombies in Terrace mounted guns on the railroad linking Terrace to Prince Rupert, announcing that they were now on "strike" as they had no desire to fight in the war. General George Pearkes headed north to Terrace, and soon restored order by telling the mutineers that the penalty for mutiny was death, but promising that if the men laid down their arms, no one would be tried for the mutiny. The following debates in the House of Commons were very bitter, but on 8 December 1944, a motion of no-confidence in the government was defeated 143 to 70, though 34 Quebec Liberal MPs voted for the motion. The no-confidence vote marked the end of the crisis. The population of Quebec was outraged that NRMA men were being sent overseas, but as King had done everything possible to put this off, the political damage was limited. Furthermore, of the national parties in Canada, the CCF was too left-wing for Catholic and conservative Quebec, while the pro-conscription views of the Conservatives limited their appeal in la belle province, which as King noted at the time, meant the Liberals were the only party capable of forming a government Quebec could vote for.

The First Canadian Army's heavy losses and exhaustion from the Battle of the Scheldt in October–November 1944 led to a three-month rest period for the field army, which prevented further losses. In addition, the transfer of the I Canadian Corps from Italy provided the First Canadian Army further manpower as it joined the 21st Army Group in February 1945 to advance into the Netherlands and northwest Germany, securing the left flank of the 2nd British Army as it advanced deep into the Reich. No further combat deployment was made until February 1945, when 12,908 men were sent overseas, most of whom were from the home service conscripts drafted under the NRMA, rather than from the general population.

Few conscripts saw combat in Europe: only 2,463 men reached units on the front lines. Out of these, 69 died. Politically, this was a successful gamble for King, as he avoided a drawn-out political crisis and remained in power until his retirement in 1948. However, King's refusal to commit the Zombies to action led to considerable bitterness among those who volunteered to "go active". In his war memoirs, Farley Mowat recalls savagely disliking those in uniform who refused to make the same sacrifices he and his brothers-in-arms were called on to make in Italy and northwest Europe. The Zombies wore a black tie and collared shirts as part of their uniforms, while volunteers for overseas duties did not. In April 1945, the men of the First Canadian Army were informed that henceforth they would now wear the Zombie black tie and collared shirt. Mowat, serving with the Hastings and Prince Edward Regiment, wrote that "the black tie itself was known as the Zombie tie, and the resentment of the volunteers, who were now ordered to wear this symbol of shame, was most outspoken."

== Postscript to the crisis ==
In the federal election on June 11, 1945, Progressive Conservative leader John Bracken proposed conscription for Operation Downfall, the planned invasion of Japan, which badly hurt his chances. By contrast, Mackenzie King promised to commit one division, the 6th, to be recruited from veterans still wanting to fight in Japan. King handily won the election, as Canadian public opinion was unwilling to support conscription for a campaign that would cause heavy losses. The invasion of Japan, scheduled in two stages for late 1945 and early 1946, was widely expected to be a bloody campaign; the Battles of Iwo Jima and Okinawa were seen as "dress rehearsals" for the invasion. Moreover, it was believed the invasion would take at least a year, if not longer.

Mackenzie King was caught between his promise to the United States that Canada would fully commit to the planned invasion of Japan, and his promise that only volunteers would fight there. An unexpected naval incident appeared to foreshadow the looming crisis, when the crew of the Royal Canadian Navy cruiser HMCS Uganda, operating off the coast of Japan, announced that it had only volunteered to "go active" against Germany and had no desire to "go active" against Japan, forcing the Royal Canadian Navy, much to its embarrassment, to send the Uganda home in the summer of 1945. A few days later, on 6 August 1945, the atomic bomb was dropped on Hiroshima; a second was dropped on Nagasaki three days later. On 14 August, Emperor Hirohito addressed his subjects by radio to ask them to "bear the unbearable" (i.e. surrender). The Japanese decision to surrender instead of fighting on to the bitter end, as widely expected, saved Mackenzie King from what was emerging as a new conscription crisis.

== See also ==
- Conscription in Canada
- Conscription Crisis of 1917
