= Harry Crerar =

Canadian general (1888–1965)

General the Honourable Harry Crerar PC CH CB DSO CD
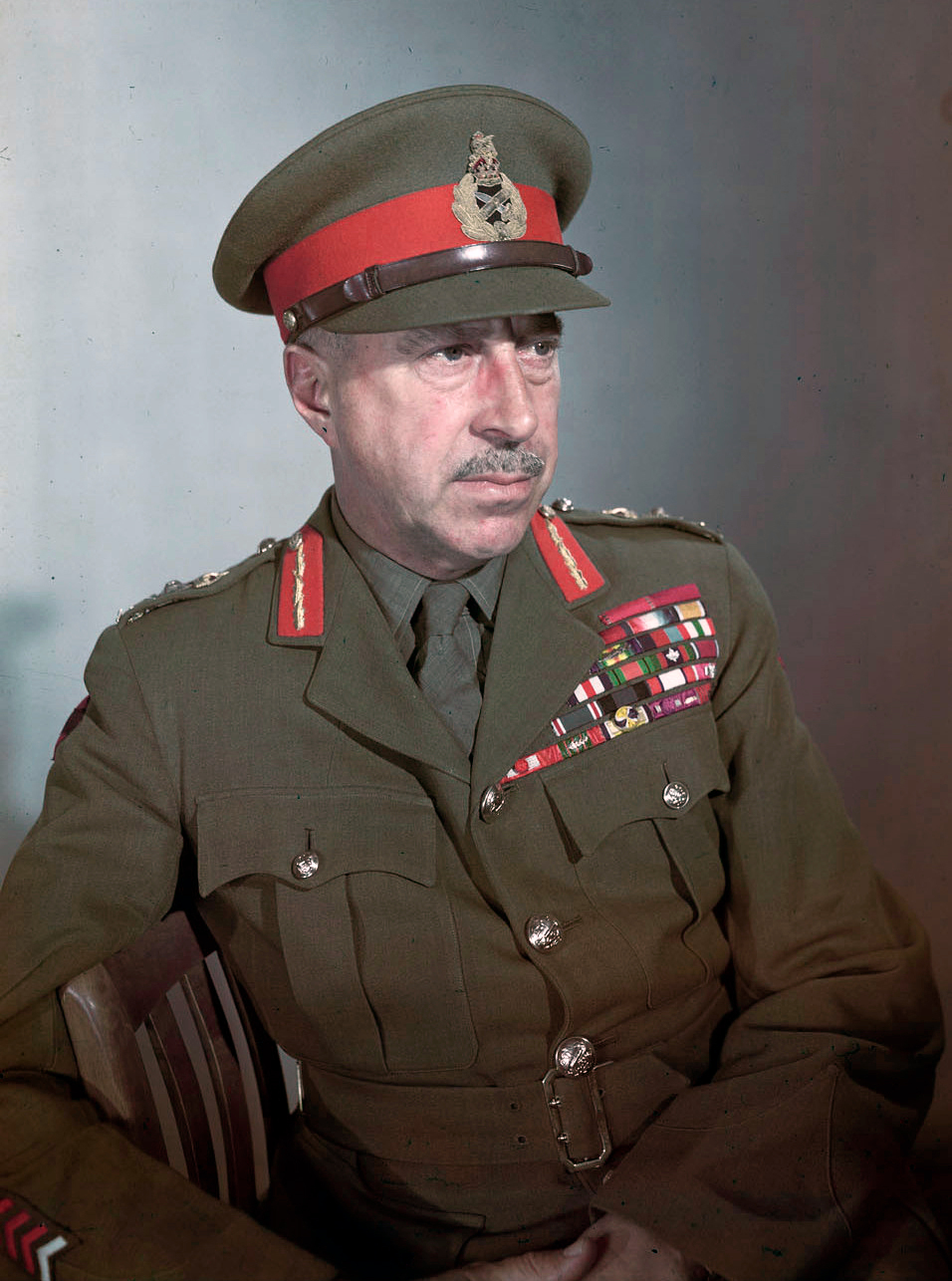
- Crerar, c. 1945
- Born: Henry Duncan Graham Crerar; 28 April 1888; Hamilton, Ontario, Canada
- Died: 1 April 1965 (aged 76); Ottawa, Ontario, Canada
- Burial place: Beechwood Cemetery
- Relatives: Adam Beck (brother-in-law)
- Military career
- Allegiance: Canada
- Branch: Canadian Army
- Service years: 1909–1946
- Rank: General
- Units: Royal Canadian Artillery
- Commands: Royal Military College of Canada; Chief of the General Staff; 2nd Canadian Infantry Division; I Canadian Corps; First Canadian Army
- Conflicts: First World War; Battle of Neuve Chapelle; Second Battle of Ypres; Battle of Flers–Courcelette; Battle of Vimy Ridge; Battle of Amiens; Battle of Valenciennes; Second World War; Italian Campaign; Battle of Normandy; Clearing the Channel Coast; Western Allied invasion of Germany
- Awards: Member of the Order of the Companions of Honour; Companion of the Order of the Bath; Companion of the Distinguished Service Order; Knight of the Venerable Order of Saint John; Recipient of the Canadian Forces' Decoration; Mentioned in despatches (5) Foreign awards; Legion of Merit (US); Army Distinguished Service Medal (US); Grand Officer of the Order of Leopold (Belgium); Croix de Guerre 1940 with Palm (Belgium); 5th Class Order of Virtuti Militari (Poland); Order of the White Lion (Czechoslovakia); War Cross 1939–1945 (Czechoslovakia); Commander of the Legion of Honour (France); Croix de Guerre 1939–1945 avec Palme (France); Grand Cross of the Order of Orange Nassau with Swords (Netherlands)
- Other work: Aide-de-Camp General to the King; Aide-de-Camp General to the Queen; Queen's Privy Council for Canada

Henry Duncan Graham Crerar, PC, CH, CB, DSO, CD (28 April 1888 – 1 April 1965) was a senior officer of the Canadian Army who became the country's senior field commander in the Second World War as commander of the First Canadian Army in the campaign in North West Europe in 1944–1945, having rapidly risen in rank from brigadier in 1939 to full general in 1944.

A graduate of the Royal Military College of Canada in Kingston, Ontario, Crerar was commissioned as a lieutenant in the Non-Permanent Active Militia in 1909, serving with the 4th Battery, Canadian Field Artillery, which was based in Hamilton, Ontario. He rose to the rank of lieutenant-colonel in the artillery. He saw action in the First World War, for which he was mentioned in despatches and made a companion of the Distinguished Service Order. Electing to remain in the army as a professional soldier after the war, he attended the Staff College, Camberley, from 1923 to 1924, and the Imperial Defence College in 1934. He was appointed Director of Military Operations & Military Intelligence in 1935 and Commandant of the Royal Military College of Canada in 1939.

During the Second World War, Crerar became General Officer Commanding the 2nd Canadian Infantry Division, which was then stationed in England, in late 1941. He shares responsibility for initiating and reviving the tragic Dieppe Raid in 1942. He was promoted to lieutenant-general and assumed command of I Canadian Corps, fighting briefly in the Italian campaign in late 1943 and in early 1944. In March 1944 he returned to the United Kingdom where he assumed command of the First Canadian Army which, despite its designation, contained a significant number of British, Polish and Czech troops, including the British I Corps and the Polish 1st Armoured Division.

Under Crerar's command, the First Canadian Army fought in the latter stages of the Battle of Normandy in July−August 1944, participating in Operation Totalize, Operation Tractable and the Battle of the Falaise Pocket, before clearing the Channel Coast. Crerar was promoted to full general on 16 November 1944, becoming the first Canadian officer to hold that rank in the field. During Operation Veritable, the battle for the Rhineland in 1945, the First Canadian Army controlled nine British divisions. The Army became more Canadian with Operation Goldflake, the redeployment of the I Canadian Corps from Italy and played a key role in the liberation of the western Netherlands in April 1945, shortly before the end of World War II in Europe.

Crerar retired from military service in 1946. The Canadian military historian, J. L. Granatstein, wrote of Crerar that: "No other single officer had such impact on the raising, fighting, and eventual disbanding of the greatest army Canada has ever known. Crerar was unquestionably the most important Canadian soldier of the war".

== Early years ==
Henry Duncan Graham "Harry" Crerar was born in Hamilton, Ontario, on 28 April 1888, the eldest child of Peter Crerar, a Scottish-born lawyer and businessman, and Marion Stinson Crerar. He had three younger siblings, Alistair, Violet and Malcolm, and an older half-sister, Lillian, from his mother's first marriage. His early education was in private schools in Hamilton. In 1899, he attended Upper Canada College in Toronto, the premier boarding school in Canada. He spent a year in Switzerland in 1904, then went to Highfield College in Hamilton to prepare for the Royal Military College of Canada in Kingston, Ontario. Highfield College had an Army cadet unit of which he was a member.

Crerar was one of 35 cadets who entered the Royal Military College of Canada in August 1906. This involved passing competitive examinations (which had a 33 per cent passing grade), and obtaining certificates from the minister of Christ's Church Cathedral in Hamilton and the headmaster of Highfield College testifying to his high moral character. He graduated in 1909, ranked thirteenth in his class. He hoped to secure a place with a cavalry regiment of the British Army or British Indian Army, but only seven places were available in the British or Indian armies, of which just two were in the cavalry, and he did not rank high enough. Cost was also a factor; service in a British cavalry regiment was expensive and he would have had to rely on his father topping up his income. Instead, he accepted a commission as a lieutenant in the Non-Permanent Active Militia, serving with the 4th Battery, Canadian Field Artillery, which was based in Hamilton.

Crerar took a job as a superintendent with the Canadian Tungsten Lamp Company. In 1912 he went to Vienna to study the manufacture of incandescent light bulbs. The death of his father later that year prompted a career change and a move to Toronto, where he joined his brother-in-law Adam Beck as an engineer with the Hydro-Electric Power Commission of Ontario. The two men travelled around Canada promoting the benefits of hydroelectricity and visited Europe in 1913 to observe the progress of electricity grids there. He courted Marion Verschoyle Cronyn, who was always known as Verse. She was the great-granddaughter of Benjamin Cronyn, and the daughter of Benjamin Barton Cronyn, a prominent Toronto businessman.

== First World War ==
On the outbreak of the First World War in August 1914, the 4th Battery was one of nine militia batteries called up as units to form the artillery of the 1st Canadian Division. The members of the battery all volunteered for overseas service in the Canadian Expeditionary Force (CEF). Crerar was promoted to captain. The 1st Division went into camp at Valcartier, near Quebec City, where the 4th Battery was reorganized with six guns instead of four, and was renumbered the 8th Battery. The table of organization and equipment of each battery called for 6 officers, 187 other ranks, and 183 horses. Three batteries formed a brigade; the 8th Battery was part of the 3rd Brigade. The battery embarked for the UK on the SS Gambion on 1 October, and reached Plymouth on 14 October.

The 1st Canadian Division went into camp on Salisbury Plain. Training was interrupted in November. Experience in mobile warfare had shown that six-gun batteries were too hard to control, so the British War Office decided to revert to the old four-gun battery organization. The reorganization of the Canadian batteries commenced on 17 November, and the 8th Battery was renumbered the 11th Battery. Each brigade should have had three batteries of 18-pounders and one of the 4.5-inch howitzers, but the latter were not yet available. Training was hampered by the weather; it rained on 89 of the 123 days the Canadians spent there, and there was competition for firing ranges from British units. There were also shortages of ammunition, and the batteries did not fire their guns until January 1915, when each fired 55 rounds.

The 1st Canadian Division moved to the Western Front in February 1915. The following month the division artillery participated in the Battle of Neuve Chapelle, where the 1st Canadian Division had a minor role, and in April was engaged in the Second Battle of Ypres, when the 11th Battery came under sustained German artillery fire. Crerar acted as 11th Battery commander from 11 to 22 July, and then assumed command of the 10th Battery. On 7 December he left on furlough to England then returned to Canada, where he married Verse at St Paul's Anglican Church in Toronto on 14 January 1916 in a ceremony conducted by Archdeacon H. J. Cody. He spent another month on leave in Canada before the two embarked for the UK, where she worked as a volunteer nurse at a hospital in Kingston upon Thames. She returned to Canada for the birth of their first child, a daughter named Margaret (known as Peggy), in November 1916.

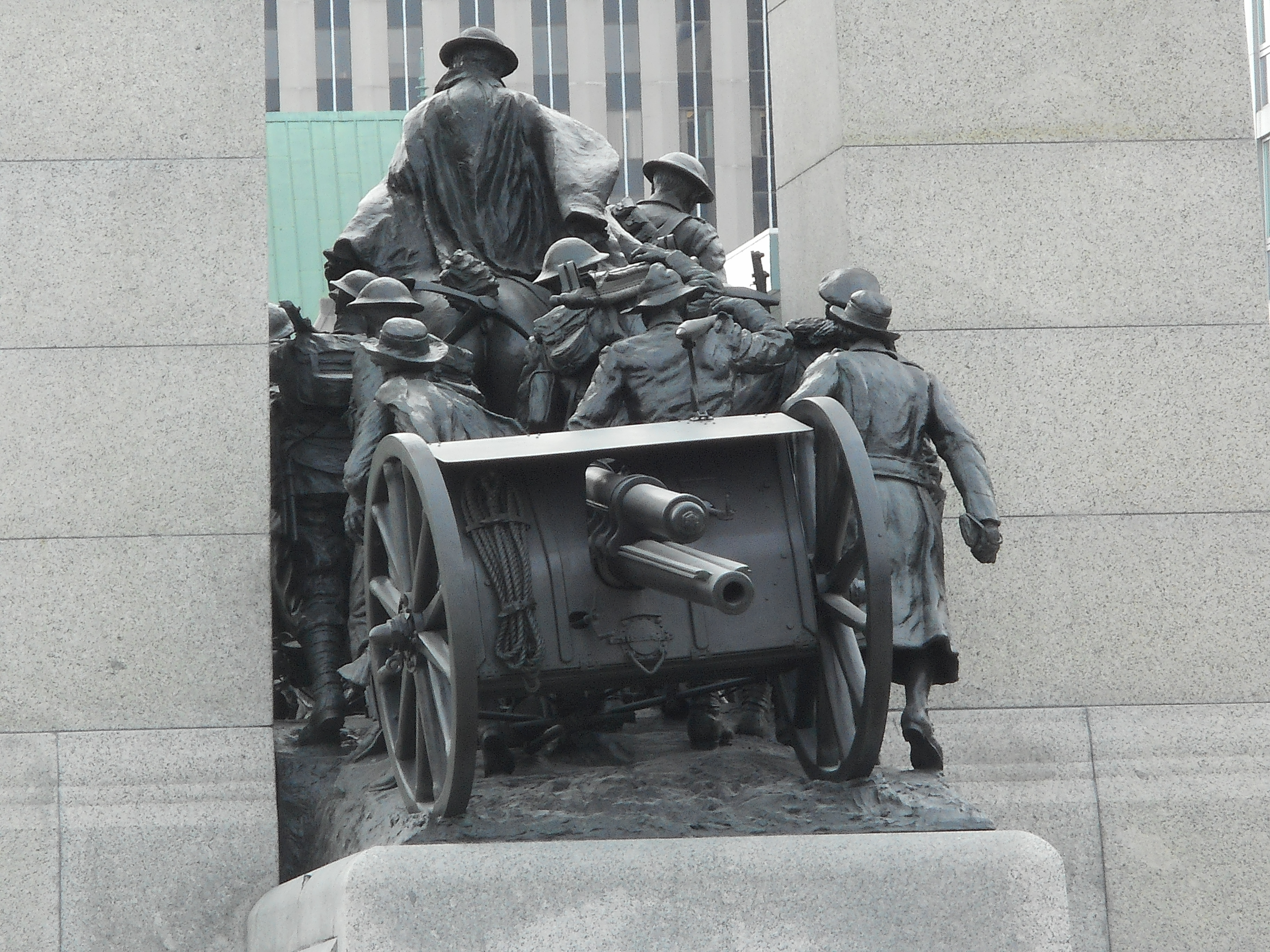
The Canadian National War Memorial in Ottawa depicts an 18-pounder.

Crerar returned to the 3rd Brigade as adjutant on 22 February. He assumed command of the 11th Battery again on 25 March. It supported the Canadian attacks in the Battle of Flers–Courcelette in September 1916. He attended a gunnery course at Witley Camp in England in February 1917, but returned to lead the 11th Battery in the Battle of Vimy Ridge in March. He was mentioned in dispatches and made a member of the Distinguished Service Order in the 1917 Birthday Honours.

In May 1917, Crerar attended a junior staff officer course. In August he became brigade major of the newly formed 5th Canadian Division Artillery, which was training in England, but soon after joined the Canadian Corps on the Western Front. Crerar worked closely with the brigade major of the Canadian Corps Artillery, British major Alan Brooke, or "Brookie", as he was known from then on to Crerar, "a great fellow", and they would often "tramp the front line of battery positions together." Crerar also worked with the corps counter battery staff officer (CBSO), Lieutenant-Colonel Andrew McNaughton; the two devised techniques for employing the corps's Newton 6-inch mortars in a counter-mortar role.

In June 1918, as part of the ongoing "Canadianization" of the corps, Brooke was given an appointment on the staff of the British First Army and was succeeded as Staff Officer, Royal Artillery, (SORA) by Major Don A. White. White was immediately sent on a staff course, and Crerar acted as SORA until he returned. Crerar was thus SORA during the Battle of Amiens in August 1918. In October, McNaughton became the General Officer Commanding (GOC) Canadian Corps Heavy Artillery, and Crerar succeeded him as the CBSO, a position he held during the Battle of Valenciennes in November 1918. That month saw the war come to an end due to the Armistice with Germany.

Although Crerar had survived the war unscathed, his two younger brothers were not so fortunate: his youngest brother, Malcolm Charlton Crerar, was killed in action, aged 19, on 3 August 1917 while serving in Palestine with the Royal Flying Corps, and his other brother, Alistair John Crerar, was badly wounded in France in 1918 while serving with the Royal Canadian Dragoons.

== Between the wars ==
With the war over, Crerar returned to Canada, where his CEF appointment was terminated on 24 March 1919. His mother died in May 1919, leaving annuities for her surviving children. Financially secure, Crerar decided to join the Permanent Active Militia, Canada's full-time professional force. He wrote to the Deputy Inspector General of Artillery (DIGA), Major-General Sir Edward Morrison, to apply for a position on the DIGA staff. Crerar was accepted, and in March 1920 he was commissioned as a major in the Royal Canadian Artillery. His second child, a boy named Peter, was born in July 1922.

Crerar set his sights on attending the British Staff College, Camberley, where two positions were set aside for Canadian officers each year. He completed a four-month preparatory course at the Royal Military College, passed the Camberley entrance examinations in 1922, and secured admission in January 1923. At the time the college commandant was Major-General Edmund Ironside, and the college staff included Lieutenant-Colonels Ronald Adam, Alan Brooke and J. F. C. Fuller. Normally staff college would be followed by a staff appointment in Canada, but the death of the Canadian representative at the War Office led to Crerar being given a two-year posting as a General Staff Officer, 2nd Grade (GSO2), in the office of the Director of Military Operations and Intelligence (DMO&I), who was Lieutenant-Colonel Archibald Wavell at the time. In this role he helped coordinate the British Army's response to the 1926 United Kingdom general strike. Crerar concurrently served as the Canadian representative at the War Office.

On returning to Canada in April 1927, Crerar was appointed to command B Battery, Royal Canadian Horse Artillery. His subalterns included a recent Royal Military College graduate, Lieutenant Guy Simonds. In January 1928, Crerar became Professor of Tactics at the Royal Military College. Then, in May 1929, he was suddenly called to National Defence Headquarters (NDHQ) in Ottawa to serve on the General Staff at the behest of McNaughton, who was appointed the Chief of the General Staff (CGS), the head of the Canadian Army, in January 1929. He joined that staff of the Canadian DMO&I, Colonel Harold Matthews, as General Staff Officer, 1st Grade (GSO1).

After the death of their newborn third child in May 1933, Verse took Peter and went to England to join Peggy, who was at boarding school there. Crerar had McNaughton and Matthews nominate him to attend the Imperial Defence College in London in 1934 so the family could be reunited. He was the eleventh Canadian officer to attend since its founding in 1927. While there, he again encountered his friend Brooke, who was now an instructor at the college. Crerar performed well, with his assessment stating that he possessed "outstanding ability", with "all the attributes for high command." He returned to Ottawa in 1935 as DMO&I, an extremely important post, the senior staff planner for the army. Then in August 1938, he became the commandant of the Royal Military College, and with it came the temporary rank of brigadier.

== Second World War ==
=== Canadian Military Headquarters ===
With the Canadian declaration of war on Germany on 10 September 1939, Canada entered the Second World War. Crerar expected a Canadian contribution to the war on land akin to that of the First World War, but the Prime Minister, William Lyon Mackenzie King, hoped an industrial effort and participation in the British Commonwealth Air Training Plan would suffice. On 19 September, the government announced it would send one division, the 1st Canadian Division under McNaughton, to the UK.

Crerar was appointed Brigadier, General Staff, (BGS) of what was initially called "Overseas Headquarters", but was soon renamed Canadian Military Headquarters (CMHQ), in London. He established CMHQ on the second floor of the Sun Life Building, not far from Canada House on Trafalgar Square. CMHQ expanded from 87 personnel in December 1939 to over 900 a year later. The legal basis of the Canadian presence in the UK had changed with the 1931 Statute of Westminster which made Canada a sovereign nation in its own right, and was now governed by the 1933 Visiting Forces Act, which provided the legal basis for Canadian forces serving under British command. Crerar was promoted to acting major general, "while holding his present appointment", on 15 January 1940. He hoped to be given command of the 2nd Canadian Division when it was formed, but that went instead to Victor Odlum, a militia officer.

=== Chief of the General Staff ===
The Battle of France injected some urgency into the Canadian war effort, and on 17 May 1940 the government finally announced the decision to form a Canadian corps. In the meantime, the Canadian troops in the UK formed part of the British VII Corps, which was placed under McNaughton's command. This was renamed the Canadian Corps on 25 December after sufficient Canadian corps troops had arrived. The Minister of National Defence, Norman Rogers, was killed in a plane crash on 10 June 1940, and was replaced by James Ralston. On McNaughton's advice, Ralston recalled Crerar to Ottawa to serve as the Vice Chief of the General Staff (VCGS). Crerar expected that he would soon be asked to take over as CGS. This occurred the following month, just two days after he arrived back in Canada. He brought Colonel E. L. M. "Tommy" Burns from the 2nd Division staff as his DMO&I, and Brigadier Kenneth Stuart, who had succeeded him as commandant of the Royal Military College, as his VCGS.

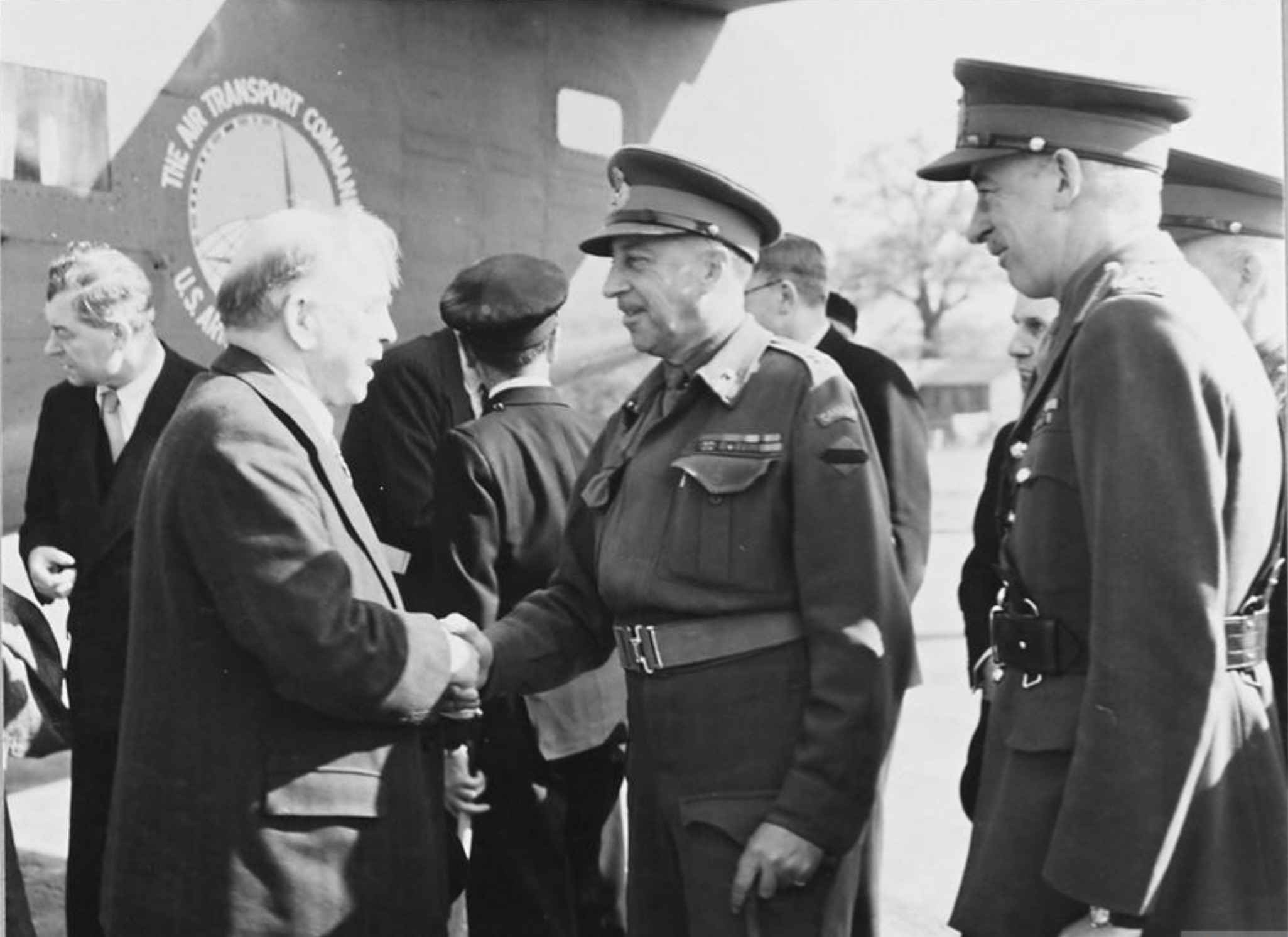
After arriving in England for the forthcoming Imperial conference, William Lyon Mackenzie King, Prime Minister of Canada, is greeted by Crerar and Lieutenant-General Kenneth Stuart, 28 April 1944.

Having achieved his objective of creating a Canadian corps, Crerar set his sights on creating an army of two corps, each of which would have two infantry divisions and an armoured division. This would be a larger force than the country could sustain with volunteers alone, and would therefore involve sending conscripts overseas, something King opposed. In Crerar's view, that was the politicians' problem. Although the proposed army headquarters did not make it into Crerar's revised army program for 1942 that was submitted to the Cabinet War Committee in November 1941, Ralston expressed his support. It was ultimately scaled back to five divisions and two independent armoured brigades, due to shortages of manpower.

More controversial was Crerar's role in the government's decision to provide Canadian troops to reinforce the garrison of Hong Kong. This arose following a visit to Ottawa by the outgoing commander of the garrison, Major General Arthur Grasett, in August 1941. Although a British Army officer, he was a Canadian and an RMC classmate of Crerar's. The British believed the chance of Japan going to war was remote, and a strong show of resolve would reassure China and help deter Japanese aggression. The Canadians were totally dependent on the British assessment of the situation, as there was no Canadian intelligence organization which could provide an independent evaluation. Crerar had studied the defence of Hong Kong while at the Imperial Defence College in 1934, but he believed that a war with the British Empire and the United States would be disastrous for Japan, embroiling it in a war it could not win.

Rather than take troops from the UK or the 4th Canadian Division, which was forming in Canada, Crerar chose to send the Winnipeg Grenadiers and the Royal Rifles of Canada, which had been on garrison duty in Jamaica and Newfoundland. In December 1941, the Japanese did attack, and the two battalions were engulfed in the Battle of Hong Kong. About 300 Canadians were killed in the fighting, and the rest became prisoners of the Japanese. A Royal Commission was convened to inquire into the disaster, but by this time Crerar had moved on, and he escaped censure. Others at NDHQ were less fortunate and were sacked.

=== Corps commander ===
It came as a surprise to many, even some that knew him well, that Crerar still yearned for a field command. A vacancy occurred at the 2nd Infantry Division through Odlum's forced retirement, and Ralston was happy to replace Crerar with Stuart, whom he found much easier to work with. Crerar's appointment was announced on 19 November 1941. That day, Ralston had the position of CGS upgraded to lieutenant-general, something Crerar had long advocated. Division command would mean dropping down to major-general once more, but his seniority would remain. In the event, Crerar never assumed command of the 2nd Infantry Division. On arrival in the UK he replaced Major-General George Pearkes as acting commander of the Canadian Corps in the absence of McNaughton, who was on extended medical leave, and so remained a lieutenant-general.

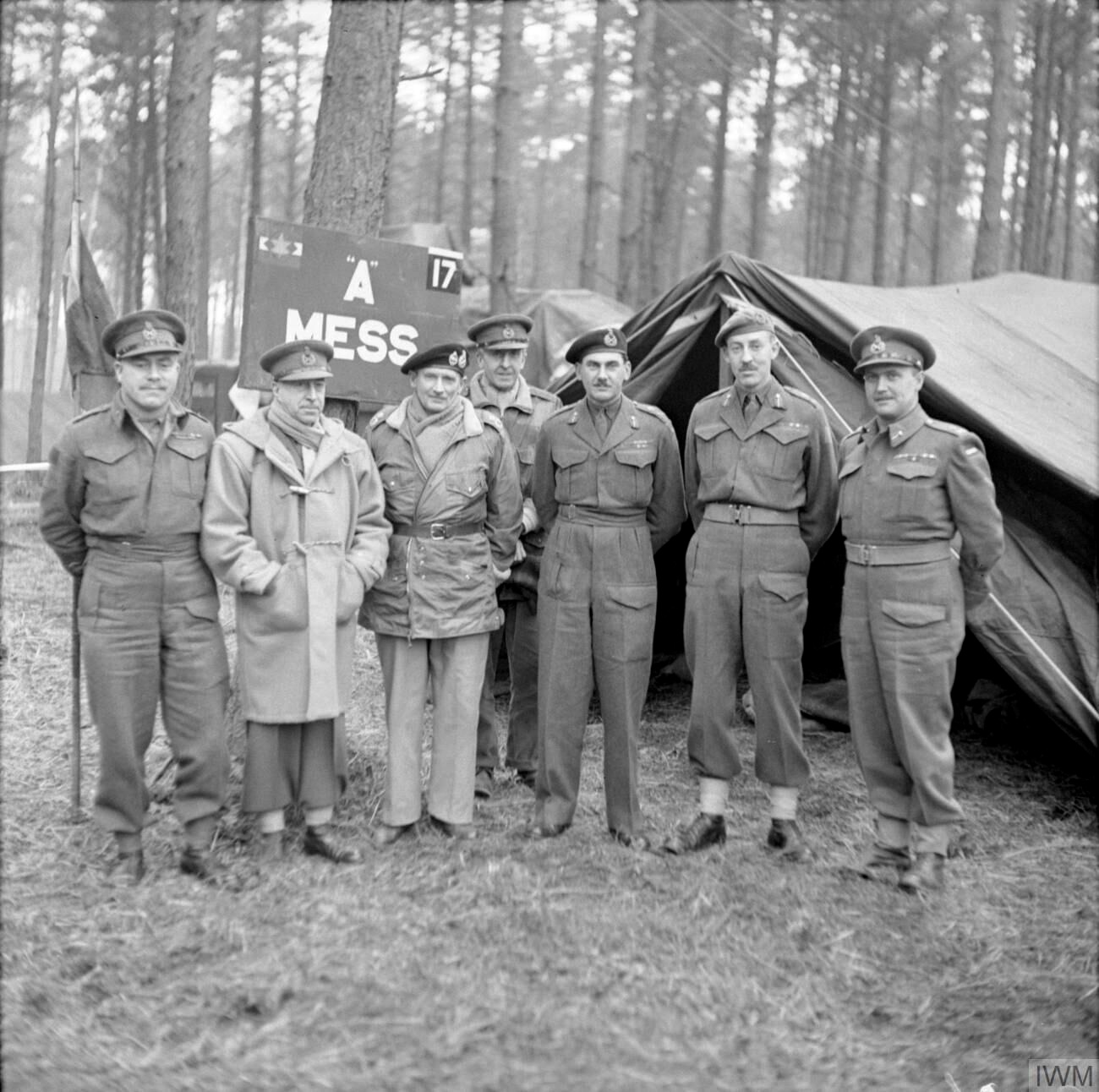
Senior Canadian Army commanders. From left to right: Major-General Christopher Vokes, General Harry Crerar, Field Marshal Sir Bernard Montgomery, Lieutenant-General Brian Horrocks (both British Army), Lieutenant-General Guy Simonds, Major-General Daniel Spry and Major-General Bruce Mathews, all pictured here during Operation Veritable in February 1945

The First Canadian Army was formed on 6 April 1942 under McNaughton's command, and Crerar therefore remained in command of the corps, which now became the I Canadian Corps, although the II Canadian Corps was not formed until 14 January 1943. For a BGS, Crerar had Guy Simonds, although not for long, as Simonds was appointed to command the 2nd Canadian Division, before transferring to command the 1st Canadian Division on 29 April 1943, after its commander, Major-General H. L. N. Salmon, was killed in a plane crash. He was replaced as BGS of I Canadian Corps by Brigadier C. Churchill Mann. In January 1943, Crerar was created a Companion of the Order of the Bath, the highest level of award permitted by Canadian government policy.

The corps formed part of South-Eastern Command, under Lieutenant-General Bernard Montgomery. Crerar and Montgomery instituted a vigorous training program. Exercise Spartan in March 1943, was a major training exercise that involved over 250,000 troops and over 72,000 vehicles. Crerar's handling of the I Canadian Corps during the exercise drew praise from McNaughton, General Sir Bernard Paget, the Commander-in-Chief, Home Forces, and Brooke, who was now a knight, a general and the Chief of the Imperial General Staff (CIGS). Paget and Brooke, however, were unimpressed with McNaughton's performance in the exercise, and Brooke in particular became an advocate for McNaughton's removal.

Without operational experience to draw on, Canadian officers were judged on technical and staff education. This tended to favour Royal Military College-educated engineers and gunners. Crerar showed tact and restraint in the relief of officers who did not meet his standards, and often suggested alternative postings where they could perform good service in a Canadian Army that was still desperately short of trained officers.

Crerar suggested that Canadian troops participate in raids on the French coast to gain combat experience. A small raid was conducted on the French coastal village of Hardelot in April 1942, but the fifty Canadian troops involved did not step ashore. A much larger raid on Dieppe on 19 August involving over 6,000 Allied troops, of whom 4,963 were Canadian. Crerar's role was restricted to the training of the 2nd Canadian Division, which ended when it went to the Isle of Wight for combined operations training. He had the right of appeal to the Canadian government if he felt the operation was unduly hazardous, but did not do so. The Canadians took heavy losses.

Crerar pressed for his troops to be committed to the North African campaign under Montgomery's command. This was opposed by McNaughton, who wanted the Canadian troops kept together under the command of a Canadian for the upcoming campaign in North West Europe, but by March 1943 it was clear that this would not occur before 1944. On 23 April 1943, Brooke met with McNaughton and presented an alternative proposal to send the 1st Canadian Division to the Mediterranean to take part in Operation Husky, the codename for the Allied invasion of Sicily. This was quickly approved by the Canadian government.

==== Service in Italy ====
The Canadian government intended that the 1st Canadian Division would return to the UK afterwards, but in the event it remained in the Mediterranean and participated throughout most of the Italian campaign. The prime minister, King, pressed for a second Canadian division to be sent to Italy, along with a corps headquarters. Brooke and McNaughton agreed that this should be the 5th Canadian (Armoured) Division, as sending a second infantry division would leave an unbalanced force of two armoured and one infantry division in the UK. In vain, Montgomery protested that he did not need another corps headquarters, nor an armoured division; the terrain in Italy was not suitable for the employment of armour. He suggested Crerar gain experience commanding the 1st Canadian Division, a development Crerar would have welcomed, but was not to be. Simonds fell ill with jaundice in September 1943, and was replaced by Christopher Vokes. When he recovered, McNaughton gave him command of the 5th Canadian (Armoured) Division.

Simonds mistakenly blamed Crerar for this transfer, but it was because McNaughton and Montgomery thought this would be good preparation for elevation to command of a corps. Crerar and Simonds came into conflict over Simonds's sacking of his divisional artillery commander, Brigadier R. O. G. Morton. Crerar was concerned the strain of the fighting in Sicily and Italy was telling on Simonds, and he sought a psychiatric assessment. Crerar cautioned Simonds he was approaching a level of command where balance was as important as brilliance, and that the firing of brigadiers was a matter of concern for the Canadian government. Simonds offered to resign if Crerar had lost confidence in him, but he had not; on 6 January 1944 Crerar recommended Simonds for command of II Canadian Corps in the UK. Crerar's I Canadian Corps became operational in Italy, replacing the British V Corps in the line on 1 February 1944, but no major operations were conducted before Crerar was recalled to the UK on 3 March. On Crerar's recommendation, he was succeeded by "Tommy" Burns as GOC of I Canadian Corps.

=== Army commander ===
==== Preparation for Operation Overlord ====
Ralston and Stuart had long held doubts about McNaughton's capacity to command an army in combat operations, which they conveyed to King at the First Quebec Conference in September 1943, where the future employment of the First Canadian Army was settled. King also spoke to Brooke, who confirmed British reservations about McNaughton. Ralston and Stuart were determined that the First Canadian Army should be led by a Canadian officer, which considerably narrowed the list of suitable candidates. Agreement was reached in November whereby Crerar would ultimately be appointed, but he would be kept in Italy for a while to gain experience. In the interim, Stuart was in command. MacNaughton returned to Canada, where he was promoted to full general on the eve of his retirement from the Army in September 1944, and went on to become the Minister of National Defence.

Crerar assumed command of the First Canadian Army on 20 March 1944. Mann was appointed its chief of staff on 28 January 1944; Brigadier Alfred Ernest Walford was the Deputy Adjutant and Quartermaster General (DA&QMG), the chief administrative officer; and Colonel George Edwin (Ted) Beament, like Simonds a Kingston graduate who had served with Crerar in B Battery, was the colonel (general staff). Lieutenant-Colonel Peter Wright was GSO1 (Intelligence) and Lieutenant-Colonel C. Archibald the GSO1 (Operations). Brigadier A. T. MacLean was chief engineer, but was replaced by Brigadier Geoffrey Walsh in September. There were also several British officers, as the First Canadian Army would include a large British component.

Since the First Canadian Army would not be immediately committed to Operation Overlord, the Allied landing in Normandy, its staff became responsible for planning the exploitation phase of the campaign. This included an assault crossing of the Seine, for which Canadian engineer units were specially trained. Detailed plans were drawn up for the capture of Rouen and the port of Le Havre. Crerar's appreciation of the likely course of the campaign was that Germans would concentrate against the British sector with the aim of mounting a major counterattack. This proved to be correct.

==== Normandy ====
Crerar's First Canadian Army became operational in Normandy at noon on 23 July 1944, almost seven weeks after the initial Normandy landings, when it assumed responsibility for the eastern part of Montgomery's 21st Army Group's line, which was held by the British I Corps (Lieutenant-General John Crocker). In a letter to Brooke, Montgomery noted that Crerar "made his first mistake at 1205 hrs, and his second after lunch". Crerar immediately clashed with Crocker, a highly experienced and competent commander, requiring Montgomery's intervention. Crerar suggested he be given XXX Corps (Lieutenant-General Gerard Bucknall) or XII Corps (Lieutenant-General Neil Ritchie) instead; "Gerry" Bucknall had been his GSO2 at Kingston, and Ritchie was a colleague when Crerar had worked at the War Office in the 1920s, and he was confident he could work with both or either of them. Montgomery was unwilling to reorganize his forces just to accommodate this. I Corps would remain part of the First Canadian Army until March 1945, and, despite the rocky start, Crerar and Crocker would build a good working relationship. The II Canadian Corps came under Crerar's command at noon on 31 July, and the Polish 1st Armoured Division (Major-General Stanisław Maczek) was assigned to II Canadian Corps on 5 August, making the First Canadian Army a multinational force.

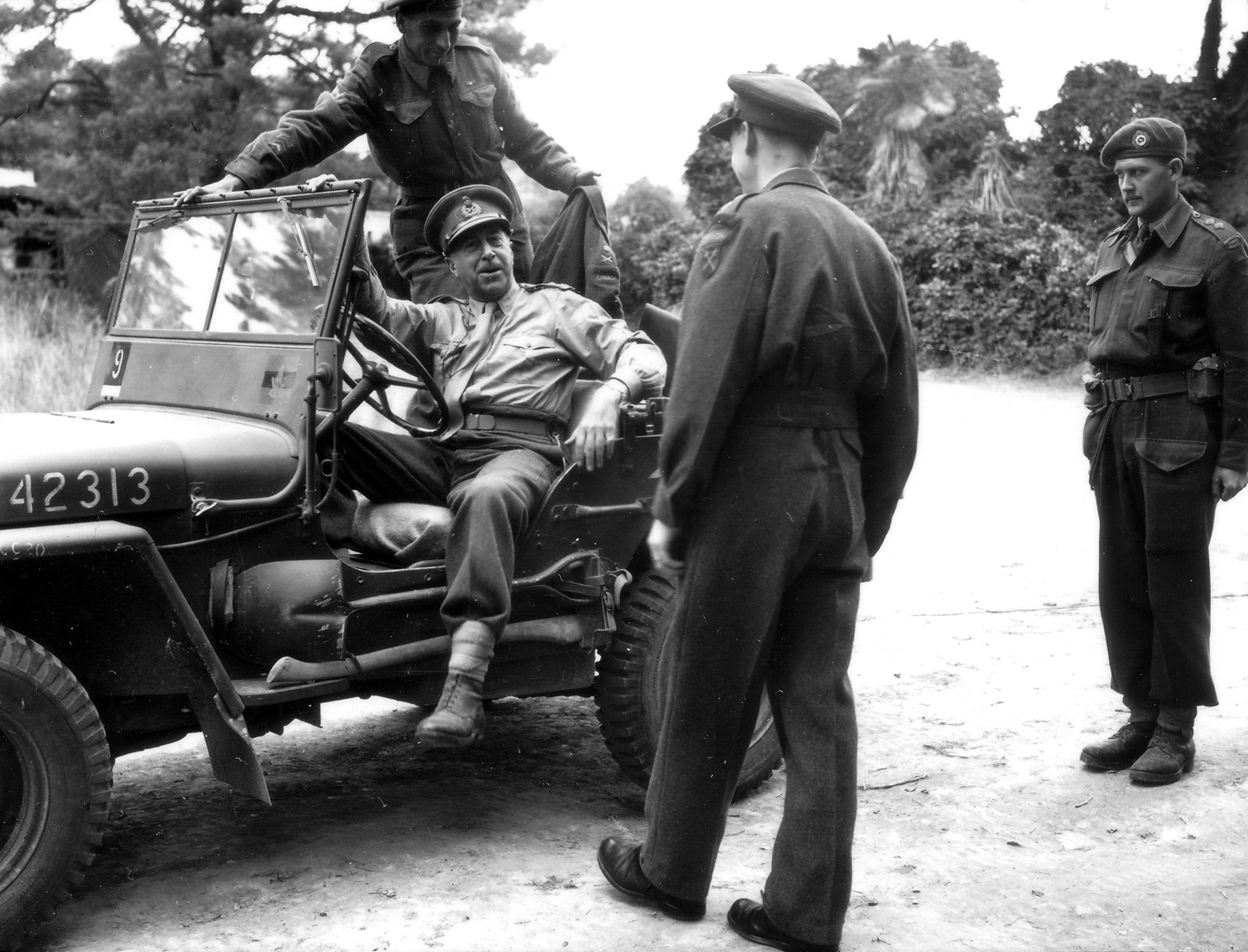
Crerar getting out of his jeep in Normandy in July 1944

The First Canadian Army HQ consisted of Main HQ and Rear HQ. The former contained the operational staff while the latter was primarily administrative. Tac HQ was a part of Main HQ that could be temporarily split off when Crerar was required to be closer to the action, but he preferred to command from Main HQ, and rarely established Tac HQ more than 5 miles (8.0 km) from Main HQ. When possible, Main HQ was co-located with that of No. 84 Group RAF (Air Vice-Marshal Leslie "Bingo" Brown) and Beament worked closely with his opposite number on Brown's staff, Group Captain Frederick Rosier. Brown was replaced by Air Vice-Marshal Edmund Hudleston on 10 November 1944. Crerar's day normally commenced with being awakened by his batman, who served him a cup of tea. His aide-de-camp, Lieutenant Finlay Morrison, would brief him at 06:30, and he would meet with his senior staff officers, Mann, Beament, Walford and the GSO1s for intelligence, air and operations. Crerar would do his paperwork in the morning, then would then visit his corps commanders, accompanied by his other aide, Lieutenant Giles Perodeau. He did not use Mann as his representative like Montgomery used his chief of staff, Major-General Sir Francis de Guingand.

Operations conducted by First Canadian Army in the Battle of Normandy were Operation Totalize on 7 August 1944 and Operation Tractable a week later. In the earlier fighting in Normandy, Crocker and the commander of the British Second Army, Lieutenant-General Miles Dempsey had expressed doubts about the physical and mental fitness of the commander of the 3rd Canadian Infantry Division, Major-General Rod Keller. Crerar was disappointed, as he was considering Keller as a replacement for Burns in Italy. Montgomery responded by moving the 3rd Canadian Infantry Division to the II Canadian Corps, so Canadian officers could deal with the situation if they thought that relief was called for. Simonds spoke to Keller, and agreed with Dempsey's assessment, but took no action. Keller was seriously wounded by American bombers on 8 August, and was succeeded by Major-General Daniel Spry ten days later. The performance of the 4th Canadian (Armoured) Division in Operation Totalize led to Simonds's relief of its commander, Major-General George Kitching. "If it's any comfort to you," Crerar told Kitching, "it may not be long before Montgomery tries to remove me!"

==== Clearing the Channel Coast ====
After the Allied break-out from Normandy, the First Canadian Army conducted the clearing the Channel Coast. The fighting in Normandy had left the First Canadian Army short of men. In the confined terrain, the infantry accounted for 76 per cent of all casualties instead of 48 per cent as forecast by the War Office. The 2nd Canadian Infantry Division alone was 1,900 infantry short by 26 August. Particularly acute was a shortage of French-speaking reinforcements for Les Fusiliers Mont-Royal and Le Régiment de Maisonneuve. CMHQ retrained reinforcements for other branches as infantry, and wounded men were returned from hospital as quickly as possible. Despite expedients, by 31 August, the First Canadian Army was 4,318 men short. Crerar resisted suggestions that training time for reinforcements be cut. Nor was the problem confined to Canadian troops; on 17 August Crerar received a reminder from the Polish Commander-in-Chief, General Kazimierz Sosnkowski that the Polish forces were having difficulty in obtaining reinforcements.

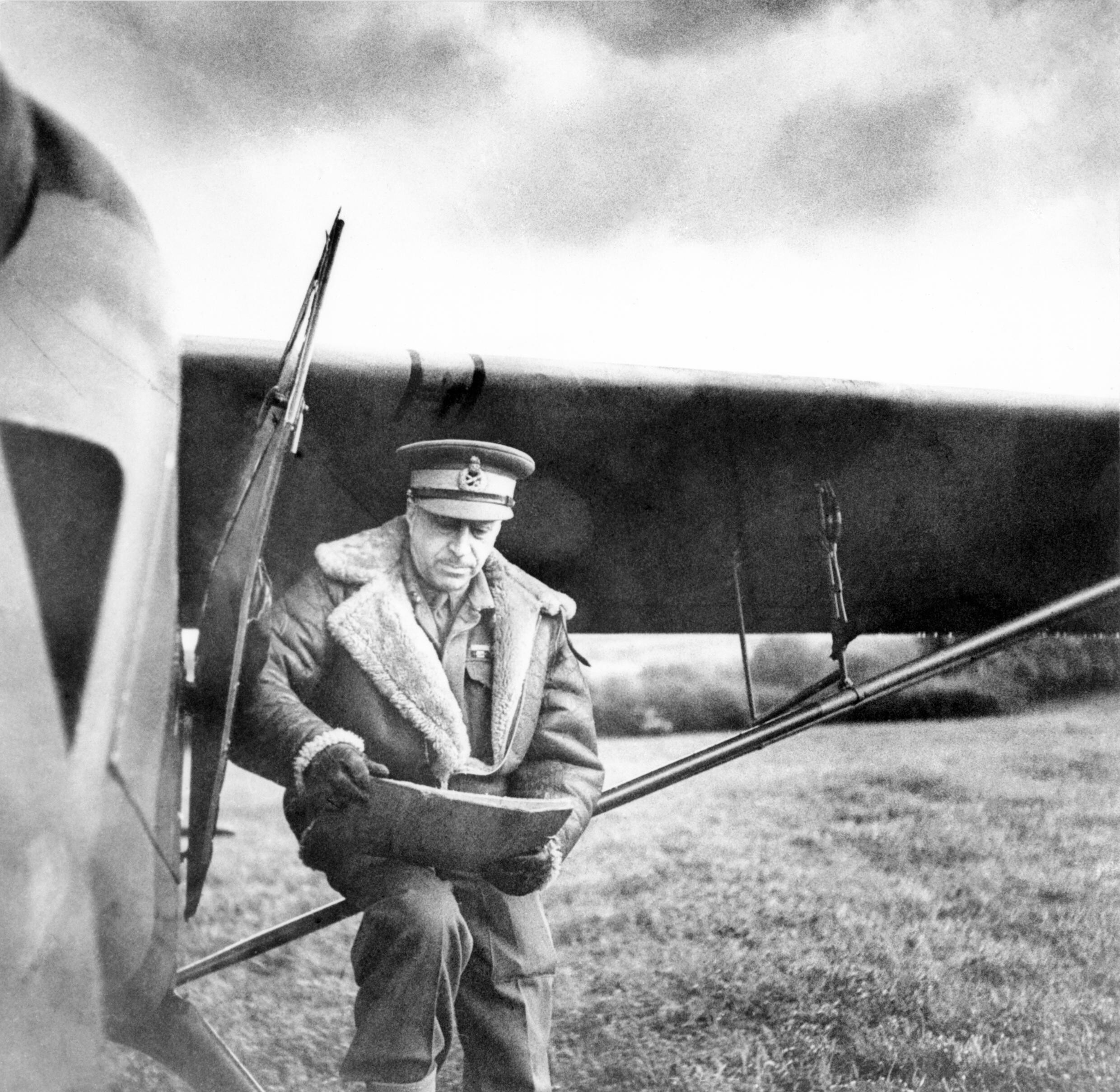
Crerar consults a map while sitting on the wing strut of a Taylorcraft Auster Mk. III light observation aircraft in 1945.

A row erupted between Montgomery and Crerar after Crerar chose to attend a commemoration at Dieppe on 3 September instead of a briefing on Operation Market Garden that was attended by senior British and American commanders. When Montgomery threatened to have Crerar replaced, Crerar replied that as the national commander he would take the matter up with the Canadian government. Montgomery immediately backed off; while he might have been successful in removing Crerar, he might also have been removed himself, and his claim to be Allied ground forces commander would have been discredited.

Crerar was featured on the cover of 18 September 1944 issue of Time magazine. By this time, he was suffering from severe abdominal pain. An attack of dysentery on 19 September compelled him to seek medical advice. The doctors diagnosed anemia, and on 25 September ordered him to undergo further diagnosis and treatment in the UK. Crerar conferred with Montgomery, who accepted his recommendation that Simonds became acting commander of the First Canadian Army. Montgomery may have hoped Crerar would not recover, but when he did, Montgomery persuaded Brooke to delay his return to 7 November, so there would not be a change of army leadership in the midst of the Battle of the Scheldt.

Crerar had to deal with the problem of Burns's command of the I Canadian Corps. While he was prepared to discount the opinions of British officers like Field Marshal Sir Harold Alexander, the commander of the 15th Army Group, and Lieutenant-General Sir Richard McCreery of the Eighth Army, Brigadier Ernest Weeks reported that neither Chris Vokes of the 1st Canadian Infantry Division nor Bert Hoffmeister of the 5th Canadian (Armoured) Division had confidence in Burns. On 16 November Burns was replaced by Major-General Charles Foulkes, who had been acting commander of the II Canadian Corps while Simonds commanded the First Canadian Army, and before that had commanded the 2nd Canadian Infantry Division. Since Vokes disliked Foulkes, he swapped places with Harry Foster of the 4th Canadian (Armoured) Division. Over Montgomery's objections, Crerar was promoted to full general on 16 November 1944, becoming the first Canadian officer to hold that rank in the field.

==== Rhineland ====
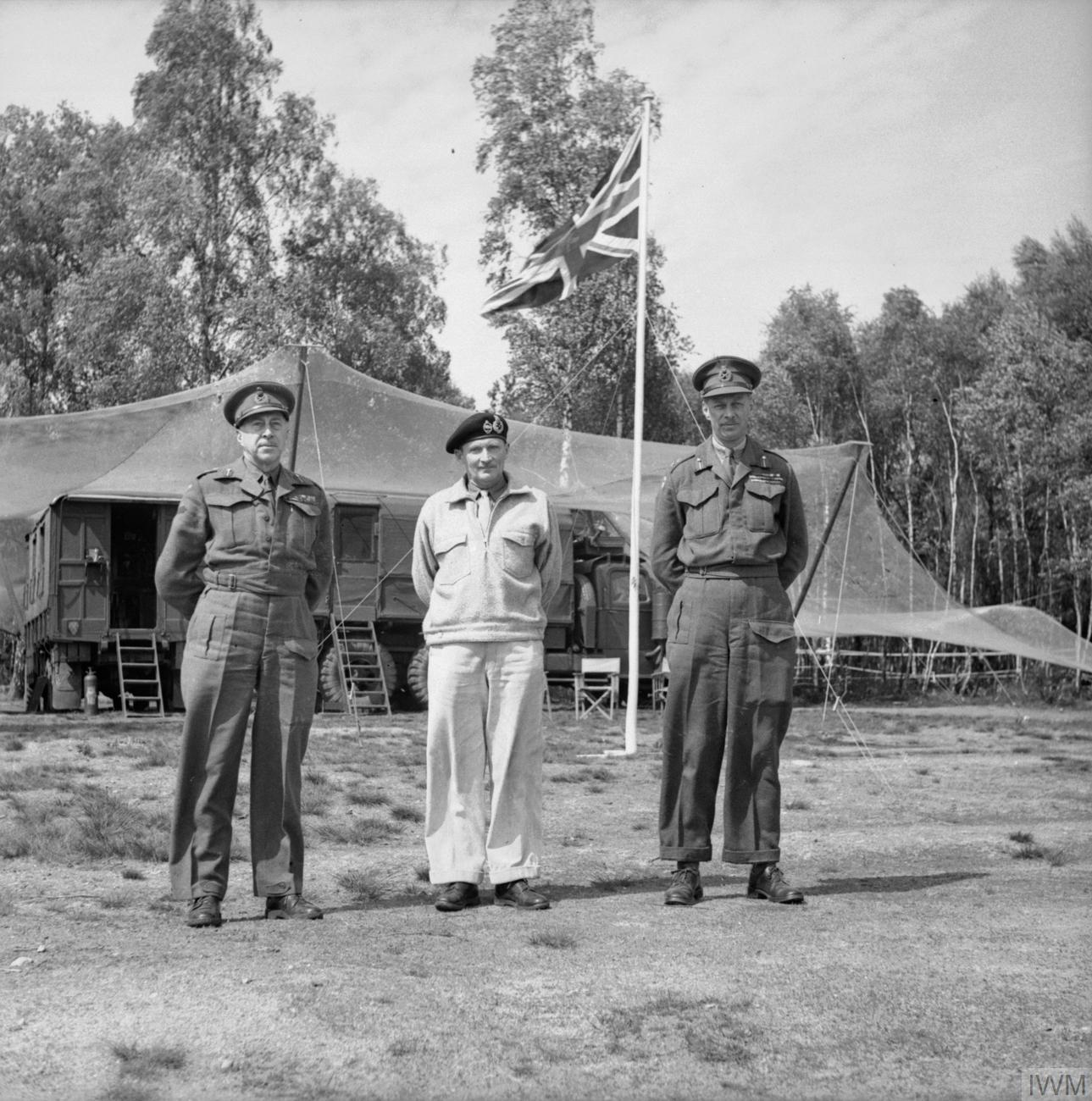
Field Marshal Sir Bernard Montgomery with his two army commanders, Crerar (left) and Lieutenant-General Sir Miles Dempsey (right), at 21st Army Group headquarters on 10 May 1945

For the Battle of the Reichswald Forest in early 1945, codenamed Operation Veritable, the First Canadian Army was reinforced with the six divisions of XXX Corps (Lieutenant-General Brian Horrocks). The First Canadian Army now had nine British divisions, and had a strength of over 400,000 personnel, which made it larger than that of the Eighth Army at the Second Battle of El Alamein. Despite casualties in the Battle of the Scheldt, the infantry battalions were up to full strength, thanks to the quiet period from November through January, the success of the retraining program, and the arrival of National Resources Mobilization Act (NRMA) conscripts, derogatorily known as "zombies".

Veritable was fought in difficult conditions and the Germans, as ever, fought with determination and breached the Roer River dams, turning the battlefield into a quagmire, reminiscent to some of the worst battlefields of the First World War. The historian, Bill McAndrew, described it as "the epitome of the Canadian way of war: large scale orderly preparation, accumulation of massive resources, and meticulous planning. It was another Vimy Ridge." Horrocks wrote that,

This was a Canadian battle, and every day I was visited by General Crerar, the army commander. He was always very well-informed because, in spite of the bad weather, he made constant flights over the battlefield in a small observation aircraft. I am afraid he must have found me rather a tiresome subordinate, because this continuous battle in the mud began to take its toll, and I found myself getting very tired and irritable. But Crerar bore with me patiently.

Although it meant putting himself in danger, Crerar, "knowing he was sending men to their deaths, did not hesitate to expose himself to enemy fire". Jack Granatstein described Operation Veritable as "Crerar's finest hour". The operation was successful but at the cost of over 15,000 casualties to Crerar's First Army; German casualties were estimated at 75,000. General Dwight D. Eisenhower, the Supreme Allied Commander on the Western Front, wrote in a letter to Crerar, stating, "Probably no assault in this war has been conducted in more appalling conditions of terrain than was that one".

==== Final campaign ====
In the last two months of the war in Europe, Crerar's First Canadian Army became more Canadian than ever with Operation Goldflake, the redeployment of I Canadian Corps from Italy, and played a key role in the liberation of the western Netherlands in April 1945. On Victory in Europe Day (VE Day) Crerar wrote to the troops under his command, stating, "The business we Canadians came over here to do is virtually finished."

In recognition of Crerar's services in North West Europe, Montgomery recommended that Crerar be made a Knight Commander of the Order of the British Empire, but Canadian government policy forbade the acceptance of knighthoods. The British government responded by appointing him a Companion of Honour on 3 July 1945. He was invested with the award by King George VI. The United States made him a commander in the Legion of Merit, which was presented by General of the Army Dwight D. Eisenhower, and awarded him the Army Distinguished Service Medal, which was presented by the President of the United States, Harry S. Truman. The Netherlands gave him the Grand Cross of the Order of Orange Nassau with Swords, which was presented by Prince Bernhard. Poland awarded him the Order of Virtuti Militari; Czechoslovakia awarded him the Order of the White Lion and the Czechoslovak War Cross 1939–1945; Belgium made him a Grand Officer of the Order of Leopold and awarded him the Croix de Guerre 1940 with Palm; and France made him a member of the Legion of Honour and awarded him the Croix de Guerre 1939–1945 with palm. He also received the Canadian Forces' Decoration, and was mentioned in despatches four more times.

== Post-war ==
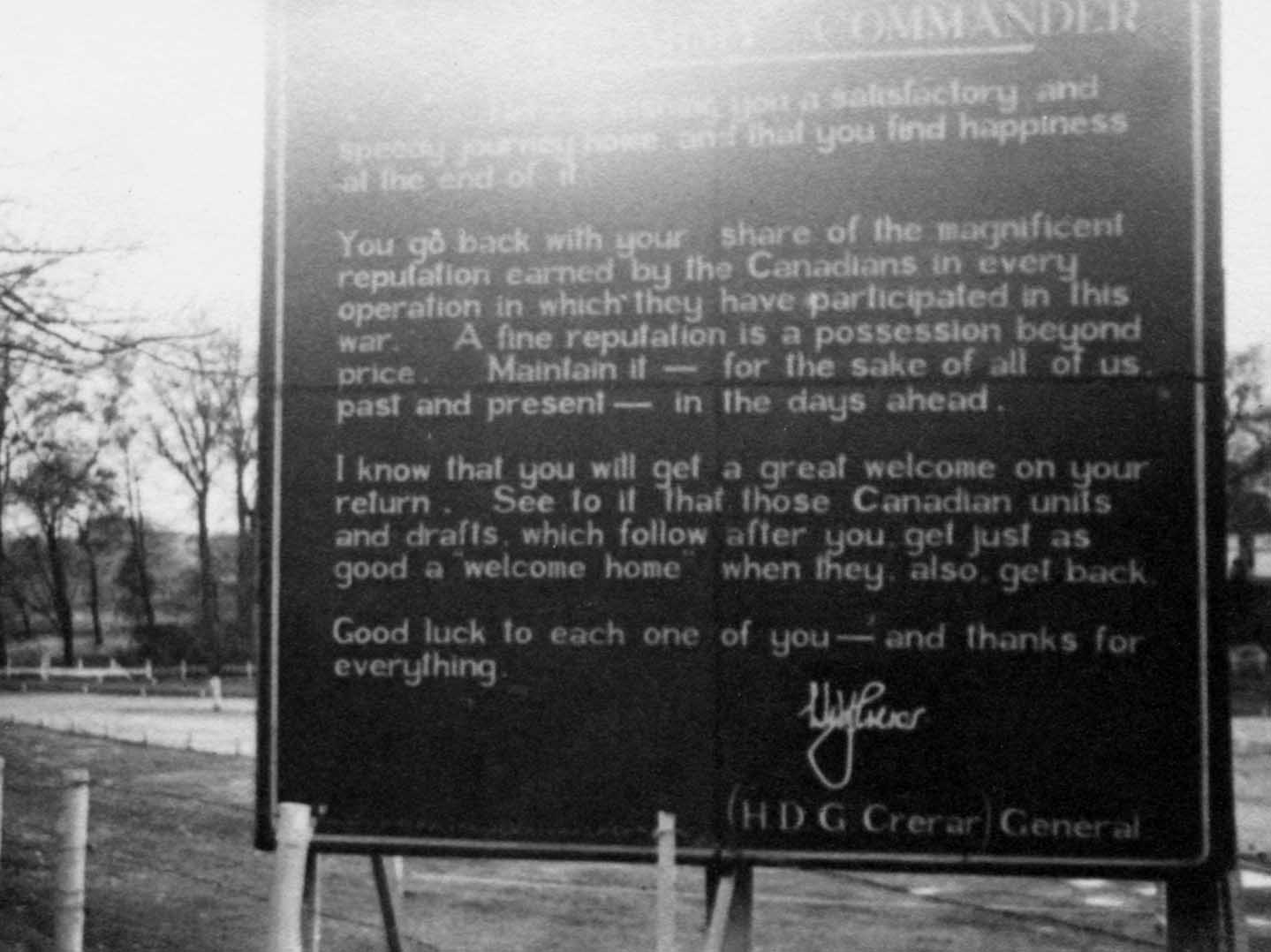
A farewell sign posted on behalf of Gen. H. D. G. Crerar to troops of the First Canadian Army departing the Netherlands in 1945

A farewell sign posted on behalf of Crerar to troops of the First Canadian Army departing from the Netherlands in 1945 read:

Here's wishing you a satisfactory and speedy journey home, and that you find happiness at the end of it. You go back with your share of the magnificent reputation earned by the Canadians in every operation in which they have participated in this war. A fine reputation is a possession beyond price. Maintain it – for the sake of all of us, past and present – in the days ahead. I know that you will get a great welcome on your return. See to it that those Canadian units and drafts which follow after you get just as good a 'welcome home' when they also get back. Good luck to each one of you – and thanks for everything. (H. D. G. Crerar) General.

Crerar handed over command of the remaining Canadian forces in the Netherlands to Simonds on 21 July. Asked for a recommendation for a post-war Chief of the General Staff, Crerar chose Foulkes. While acknowledging Simonds's brilliance on the battlefield, he considered Foulkes to be more stable. Crerar arrived in Halifax on the troopship SS Île de France, with 980 Canadian World War II veterans on 5 August 1945. Verse and Peggy came on board to greet him. He received the keys to the city, then returned to Ottawa, arriving two days later, where he was met by a guard of honour at Union Station. There was a parade down Elgin and Wellington Streets, and dignitaries including the prime minister gave speeches. He spent a day there before heading to Loon Island where his sister lived. He commenced retirement leave on 31 March 1946, and officially retired from the army on 27 October.

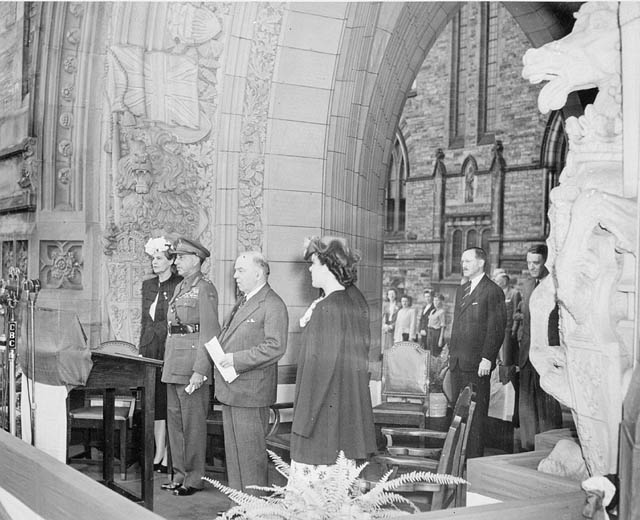
Return to Ottawa on 7 August 1945. (Left to right): Verse, Crerar, King and Peggy

In retirement he accepted positions on the boards of several companies, including Barclays bank, the Cockshutt Plow Company and the Guarantee Company of North America. He served on a series of minor diplomatic missions to Czechoslovakia, the Netherlands and Japan. He was appointed Aide-de-Camp General to the King in 1948, the first Canadian to be accorded this honour, and was an Aide-de-Camp General to Queen Elizabeth II in 1953, attending her coronation in that role. He was awarded honorary degrees by seven universities, including the University of Oxford, McGill University, the University of Toronto and Queen's University at Kingston, became a Knight of the Order of St John on 30 December 1954, and was sworn into the Queen's Privy Council for Canada on 25 June 1964. The appointment to the Privy Council was announced by the Prime Minister, Lester Pearson, on the 20th anniversary of the D-Day landing in Normandy, and commemorated the role of the Canadian Army in the campaign in North West Europe.

== Death and legacy ==
Crerar went to hospital on 24 March 1965 and died in his sleep in Ottawa on 1 April, at the age of 76. He was buried with full military honours in Beechwood Cemetery in Ottawa. McNaughton, Simonds, Foulkes, Walsh, Walford, Matthews, Mann and Wright, all of whom he had served with during the Second World War over twenty years earlier, served as his pall bearers.

General Crerar Public School in Toronto is named after him.

== Reputation ==
In The Canadian Encyclopedia Brereton Greenhous described Crerar as an able staff officer, but a mediocre commander, and Jack Granatstein described him as "a consummate bureaucrat, much more adept at winning a war of memoranda than commanding a large army in action". British historian Stephen Ashley Hart considered that "Crerar was a competent army commander, but not much more than that. He was too concerned with non-operational matters, too inexperienced, too weak a field commander, and too determined to protect Canadian interests to gain Montgomery's confidence." But Marianne Grenier argued that "to say that Crerar was an incompetent leader is to neglect his evolution as a commander and the circumstances of the times." Crerar's biographer, Paul Dickson, described him thus:

Crerar as a leader of men was awkward and reserved. He did not inspire love, and he polarized opinion among superiors, peers, and subordinates: some regarded him as a kindly figurehead, others a hard-driving terror. He led, as he tried to live, by example, yet he was aware of his limitations, perhaps too much so, and, to his credit, worked to overcome them. Still, as a general, he was probably better than a country that starved its military during peacetime deserved.

== Notes ==
Military offices
Preceded by Kenneth Stuart	Commandant of the Royal Military College of Canada; 1938–1939	Succeeded by Harold Matthews
Preceded by Thomas Anderson	Chief of the General Staff; 1940–1941	Succeeded by Kenneth Stuart
Preceded by Victor Odlum	GOC 2nd Canadian Infantry Division; 1941–1942	Succeeded by John Roberts
Preceded by Andrew McNaughton	GOC I Canadian Corps; 1942–1944	Succeeded by E. L. M. Burns
Preceded by Kenneth Stuart	GOC Canadian First Army; 1944–1945	Succeeded by Post disbanded
