= Kenneth Stuart =

Canadian army officer (1891–1945)

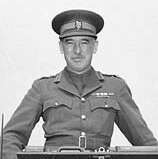
- Born: September 9, 1891; Trois-Rivières, Quebec, Canada
- Died: November 3, 1945 (aged 54); Ottawa, Ontario, Canada
- Military career
- Allegiance: Canada
- Branch: Canadian Army
- Service years: 1911–1945
- Rank: Lieutenant General
- Nickname: "Ken"
- Unit: Royal Canadian Engineers
- Commands: 7th Battalion, Royal Canadian Engineers; Royal Military College of Canada; Chief of the General Staff
- Awards: Companion of the Order of the Bath; Distinguished Service Order; Military Cross

Lieutenant-General Kenneth Stuart CB DSO MC (September 9, 1891 – November 3, 1945) was a senior Canadian Army officer who saw active service during both the First World War and, later, the Second World War. During the latter conflict, he served as Chief of the General Staff (CGS), the head of the Canadian Army, from December 1941 until December 1943, but he is perhaps most remembered today for his role in the Conscription Crisis of 1944.

== Early life and military career ==
Stuart was born on September 9, 1891, in Trois-Rivières, Quebec, the son of Henry Coleridge Stuart, an Anglican clergyman, who was then the rector of St James Church and the author of The Church of England in Canada, 1759−1793, and his wife, Annie M. Stuart (nee Colston). Although there was little money, Stuart went to Bishop's College School in Lennoxville, Quebec, in 1908, the same school his father had attended and where Andrew McNaughton, later destined to play a huge role in the young Stuart's military career, was an upper classman. 1908 also saw him apply for the Royal Military College of Canada (RMC), which was accepted, despite being twenty-eighth of the thirty-eight applicants. While he was there, however, he changed significantly, growing an inch-and-a-half until he was just under six foot tall, his chest measurement increased by four inches, and he made close friendships that would be maintained throughout his life, such as James Vernon Young, later a major-general, and Colin W. G. Gibson, later a Liberal cabinet minister, and he did better at his studies as, by the time he graduated, on June 22, 1911, he stood fifteen out of a class of thirty-three. He joined the Royal Canadian Engineers and received further training at the School of Military Engineering in Chatham, England. He returned to Canada in 1913 and was posted to the 1st Fortress Company in Halifax.

At the outbreak of the First World War in August 1914, Stuart commanded a battery of searchlights in the harbour of Halifax, Nova Scotia. He remained in this post for several more months, during which time he received a promotion from lieutenant to captain on 5 July 1915, before being sent overseas to France in late 1915, where he initially served with the 1st Army Troops Company, Canadian Engineers, one of the first mechanized engineer units then on the Western Front. He subsequently joined the 7th Field Company, part of the 3rd Canadian Division, and, after being promoted again, this time to the brevet rank of major, on 26 February 1917, he won the Military Cross (MC) in 1917, although he was slightly wounded in the process. The following year, he was given command of the 7th Battalion, Canadian Engineers. He was awarded the Distinguished Service Order (DSO) during the Battle of Amiens for bridging a river whilst under enemy fire on 8 August 1918−the so-called "Black Day of the German Army". He was promoted to the acting rank of lieutenant-colonel a week later. The Armistice with Germany on 11 November brought the war to an end soon afterwards. Despite having had a relatively good war, it had left its mark upon him, with his brother, Lieutenant Henry Cuthbert Stuart (1889-1916) having been killed in action and, although Stuart searched for four days, his brother's body was never recovered.

== Between the wars ==
Stuart was to remain in the army during the interwar period, returning to Canada soon after the armistice. His service was typical for an officer of that time period, moving to and from several military districts, initially as Temporary Senior Engineer Officer with the 13th Military District in Calgary, Alberta, a post he held from May 1919 until May 1920. After this he was then sent to the 5th Military District in his native Quebec, to serve as a District Engineer Officer, a position he held for well over five years, from June 1920 to November 1925. His service at home was then interrupted when Stuart went to England where he attended the Staff College, Camberley from 1926 to 1927.

After graduation from Camberley Stuart once again returned to Canada, where he was made a district engineer officer, this time with the 11th Military District in Victoria, British Columbia. Stuart's service there brought him into contact with a man who was to play a significant part in his life and his later military career, Andrew McNaughton, who was then the 11th Military District's district officer commanding (DOC). McNaughton soon became the Chief of the General Staff (CGS), the head of the Canadian Army. The two men and their families grew close over the next few years, especially when McNaughton became CGS. Stuart's mother, a widow who lived with the Stuarts for 18 years, grew close to McNaughton and his family, who had no grandmother, and "Andy" in particular. She would alternate Christmases in Victoria and Ottawa between both the Stuart and McNaughton families. When the Second World War broke out in 1939 she died but was found in her nursing home holding two pictures, one of McNaughton, the other of her own son.

In 1929 he became the editor of the Canadian Defence Quarterly, to which he contributed many articles. On June 22, 1931, he was promoted to brevet lieutenant colonel. In 1934 he was appointed GSO1 at the Royal Military College of Canada, where he pushed for reforms to the curriculum and to the recruitment system. On July 1, 1936, he was promoted to lieutenant colonel. In 1938 he was appointed director of military operations and intelligence at National Defence Headquarters (NDHQ) and at some point he attended the Imperial Defence College in England.

== Second World War ==
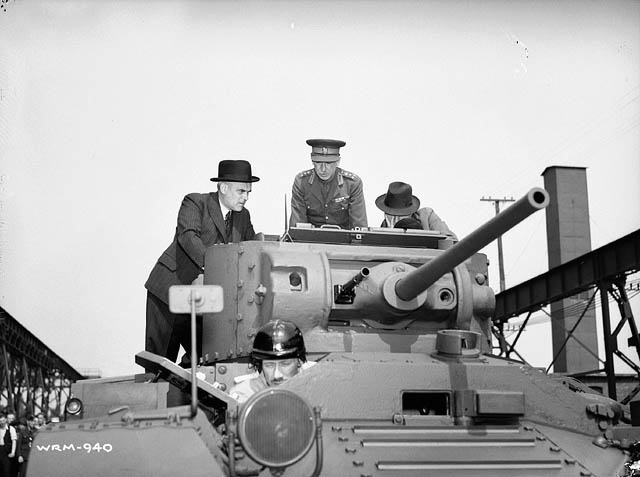
Three men, including the Hon. C. D. Howe and Brigadier Kenneth Stuart, inspecting the first Canadian-built Valentine tank at Angus Shops of the Montreal Locomotive Works (MLW), 27 May 1941.

Shortly after the outbreak of the Second World War in September 1939, Stuart was appointed commandant of the Royal Military College (RMC) of Canada and was promoted to the temporary rank of brigadier (his permanent rank being colonel on the same date) on October 15, 1939. He succeeded Harry Crerar, who went to London in a senior staff appointment. Although Stuart enjoyed being back at the RMC, he was at the same time frustrated at being left behind in what he considered to be a backwater. He tried numerous times to escape over the next few months but it would not be until July 1940 when his wish was granted due to Crerar returning to Canada where he assumed the position of Chief of the General Staff (CGS). He immediately made Stuart deputy chief of the general staff (DCGS), which also included being an army member on the Permanent Joint Board on Defence. In March 1941 his title of DCGS was changed to that of vice chief of the general staff (VCGS). On November 19, 1941, he was promoted to major general, and soon afterwards succeeded Crerar as CGS and was promoted to lieutenant general on December 24, 1941. Just over three years before, he had been a lieutenant colonel.

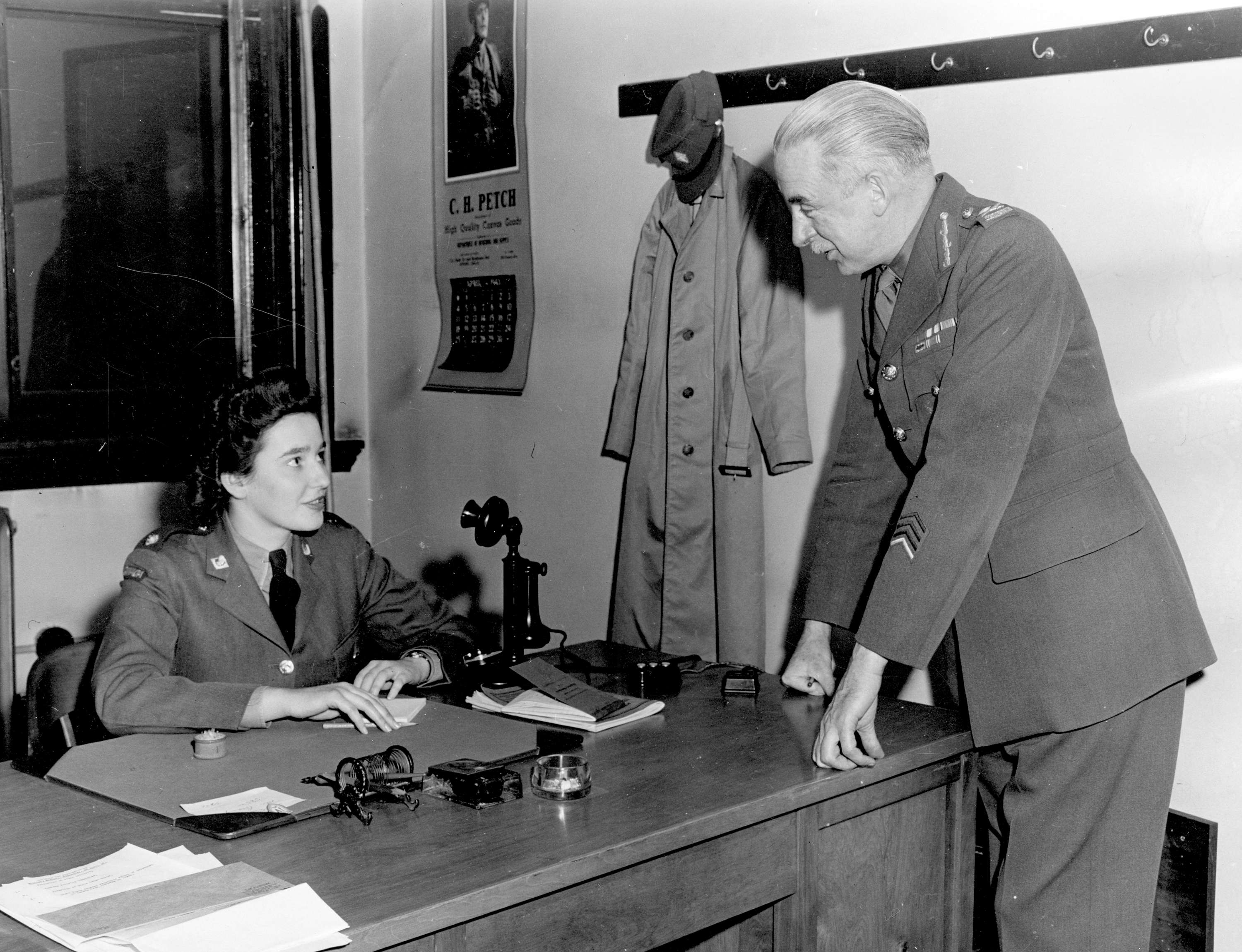
Lieutenant-General Kenneth Stuart speaks to a member of the Canadian Women's Army Corps, sometime in 1943.

In December 1943 he was appointed acting general officer commanding (GOC) of the First Canadian Army in England and then, after Crerar returned from Italy to assume command, in March 1944 Stuart was made chief of staff at Canadian Military Headquarters in England.

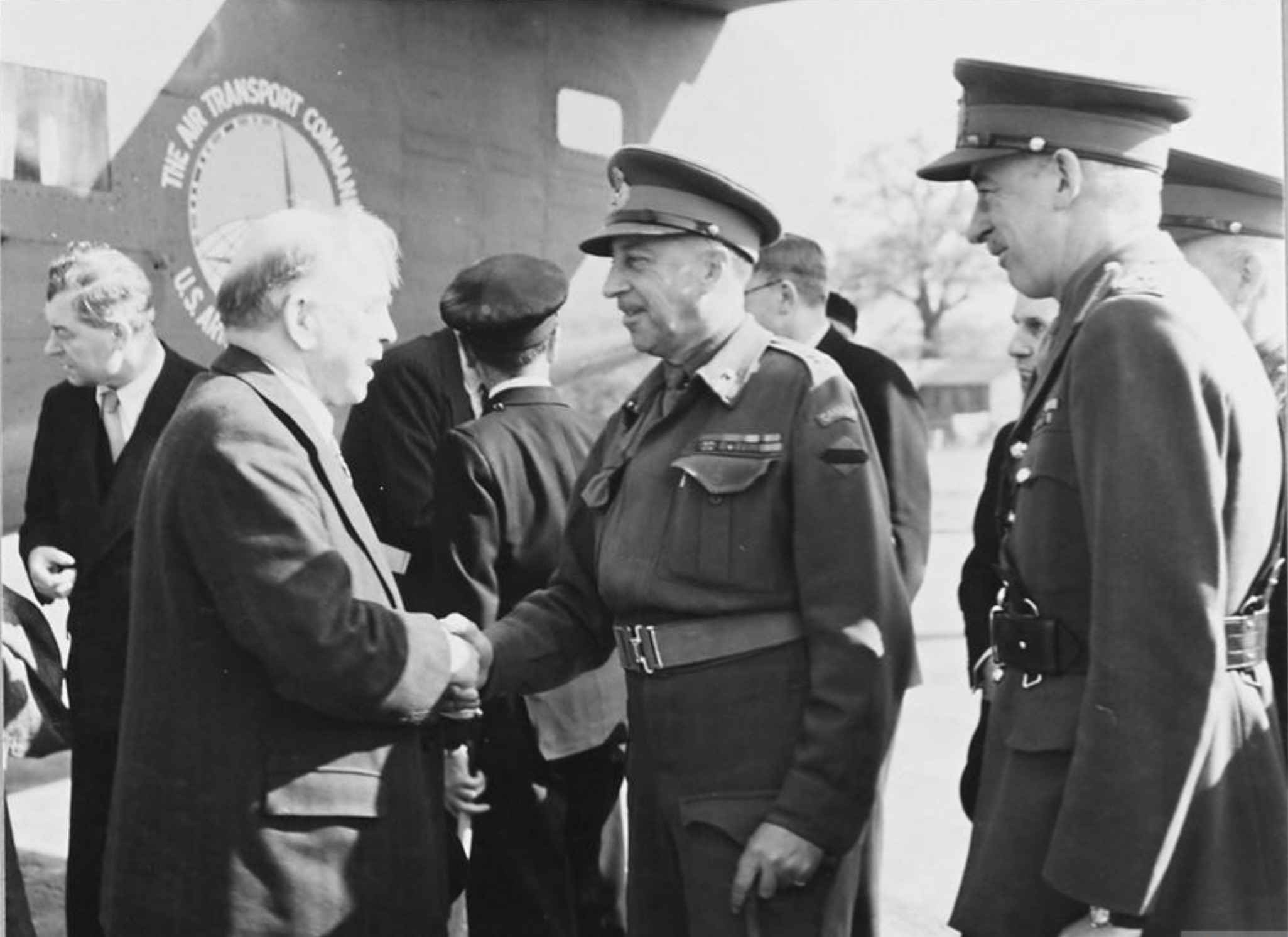
After arriving in England for the forthcoming Imperial conference, The Rt. Hon. William Lyon Mackenzie King, Prime Minister of Canada, is greeted by General Harry Crerar and Lieutenant-General Kenneth Stuart, 28 April 1944.

During the Conscription Crisis of 1944, Stuart took a pro-conscription stance, for which he was dismissed by General Andrew McNaughton, the Minister of National Defence.

== Postwar ==
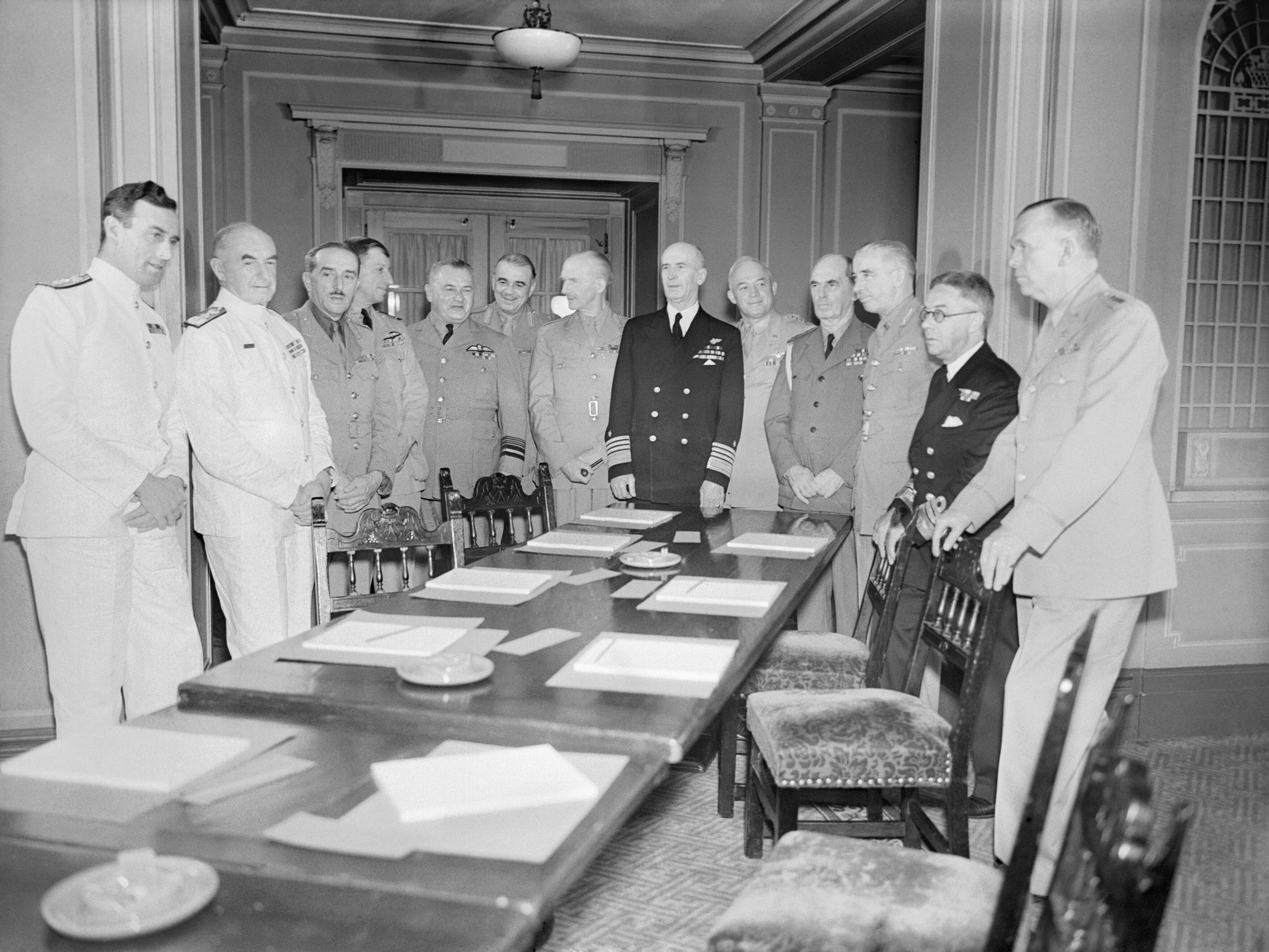
The Combined Chiefs of Staff at the Quebec Conference in August 1943. Lieutenant-General Kenneth Stuart is pictured third from the right.

He died, due in large part to the illnesses which had been a constant grievance for many years, on 3 November 1945, just a few weeks after his fifty-fourth birthday. His estate was tiny and, although his military career had spanned thirty-five years, his widow received a pension of just $180 a month. The former Minister of National Defence James Ralston, ever a close friend of Stuart's and whose career in politics had ended at the same time (and for also taking a pro-conscription stance), informed Stuart's widow, Marguerite, via telegraph, that Stuart was "a great soldier, true as steel to his country", as well as being "a rare friend." Thomas Crerar, a recently retired member of the cabinet, believed Stuart had given "fine service to his country." Perhaps unsurprisingly, neither Mrs Stuart nor her children were delighted with a telegram from Mackenzie King, in which he declared Stuart to have been "a deeply valued personal friend." At Stuart's funeral Ralston acted as an honorary pallbearer but General Harry Crerar, who was also asked to be one, declined, much to the disgust of Ralston, who in his opinion "owed more to Stuart than would ever be known."

Stuart opposed the removal of Japanese Canadians from the Pacific coast, telling Ottawa that "I cannot see that the Japanese Canadians constitute the slightest menace to national security."

== Family ==
Stuart was married to Marguerite Dorothy Stuart, née Bauld, of Halifax; he had met her in England in 1916. They had a son, Victor, and a daughter, Marguerite Stuart Shortreed. His son Victor (1918–2007) also attended the Royal Military College of Canada and reached the rank of group captain in the Royal Canadian Air Force.

== Bibliography ==
- Granatstein, Jack (2005) [1993]. The Generals: The Canadian Army's Senior Commanders in the Second World War. University of Calgary Press. ISBN 978-1-55238-176-2.
- Granatstein, Jack (2016). The Weight of Command Voices of Canada's Second World War Generals and Those Who Knew Them. Vancouver: University of British Columbia Press. ISBN 9780774833028.

Military offices
Preceded by Halfdan Hertzberg	Commandant of the Royal Military College of Canada; 1939–1940	Succeeded by Harry Crerar
Preceded by Harry Crerar	Chief of the General Staff; 1941–1943	Succeeded by John Murchie
