= National Resources Mobilization Act =

Canadian WWII planning law

Parliament of Canada
- Long title: An Act to confer certain powers on the Governor in Council for the mobilization of resources in the present war
- Citation: 4 George VI, Chap. 13
- Enacted by: Parliament of Canada
- Assented to: June 21, 1940

The National Resources Mobilization Act, 1940 (French: Loi sur la mobilisation des ressources nationales, 4 George VI, Chap. 13) was a statute of the Parliament of Canada passed to provide for better planning of a much greater Canadian war effort, both overseas and in military production at home.

== Scope ==
Modelled on the British Emergency Powers (Defence) Act 1939, as amended in 1940, it gave the Canadian government the power to

do and authorize such acts and things, and make from time to time such orders and regulations, requiring persons to place themselves, their services and their property at the disposal of His Majesty in right of Canada, as may be deemed necessary or expedient for securing the public safety, the defence of Canada, the maintenance of public order, or the efficient prosecution of the war, or for maintaining supplies or services essential to the life of the community.

This was the basis of all organization for Canada's war production.

=== Preparation for military readiness ===
In order to prepare the population for military service, provision was made under the Act for:

- compulsory national registration
- restricting men eligible for military service from obtaining civilian employment in positions considered not to be essential to the war effort, so that women, and men who had been discharged from service or who were ineligible for service, could be hired instead
- requiring men to submit to medical treatment in order to be called up for military service
- conscription

=== Employment control ===
The Act was also used to ensure greater efficiency that was required in a wartime economy by:

- requiring employers to report who their employees were
- barring agricultural workers, after March 23, 1942, from obtaining non-agricultural employment (other than in primary industry, active service or military training) without permission
- from June 17, 1942, requiring any worker to obtain a permit before he or she could start working for an employer, and such permission could be refused
- from September 1, 1942, instituting a national system of employment control under the National Selective Service Regulations, 1942, so that no-one could seek a new job without possessing a permit to do so, no employer could advertise for workers without permission, no-one was allowed to be out of work for more than seven days, and anyone could be required to apply for any available full-time suitable work of high or very high labour priority and to accept any such work offered to him. In conjunction with these measures, the Wartime Prices and Trade Board restricted non-essential industrial activity to the minimum needed for civilian requirements (although tensions existed between the Board and the National Selective Service).
- issuing Compulsory Employment Transfer Orders, compelling certain classes of men to engage in essential employment, and requiring their current employers to release them for that purpose, during several stages in 1943:

Classes of men compelled to engage in essential employment, by Order (in force until May 17, 1945)
Order	Age or status	Restricted from entering in stated industries	Or in stated occupations
1st Order (May 19, 1943)	Anyone born in 1917–1924 who has turned 19; Anyone born in 1902–1916 who, at July 15, 1940, was unmarried, divorced or judicially separated, or a widower without children (or who has become divorced, judicially separated or such a widower since that date)	taverns; liquor, wine and beer stores; retail sales of candy, confectionery, tobacco, books, stationery and news; barber shops and beauty parlors; retail and wholesale florists; service stations; retail sale of motor vehicles and accessories; retail sale of sporting goods or musical instruments	waiter, taxi driver, elevator operator, hotel bell boy, domestic servant; entertainment; dyeing, cleaning and pressing (not including laundry work), baths, guide service, shoe shining
2nd Order (June 15, 1943)	As for 1st Order	retail stores; manufacture of specified non-essential items; distilling alcohol for beverages; factory production of statuary and art goods; ice cream parlours and soda fountains	bus boys; charmen and cleaners; custom furriers; dancing teachers; dishwashers; doormen and starters; greens keepers; grounds keepers; porters (other than on railways); private chauffeurs
3rd Order (July 15, 1943)	Anyone born in 1917–1927 who has turned 16; Anyone born in 1902–1916 who, at July 15, 1940, was unmarried, divorced or judicially separated, or a widower without children (or who has become divorced, judicially separated or such a widower since that date)	any wholesale activity not listed as essential; raising of special livestock (i.e., racehorses and pets); flower growing; horticultural services, except tree surgery; leather currying, finishing, embossing and japanning; brewing; manufacture of specified non-essential items (further list)	
4th Order (July 23, 1943)	All young men who have reached their 16th birthday, but have not yet reached their 19th birthday	As in 1st and 2nd Orders	As in 1st and 2nd Orders
5th Order (August 3, 1943)	As in 3rd Order	Candy, confectionery, soft drinks, flavouring extracts, syrups and essential oils; Tobacco, tobacco pipes and cigarette holders; Hats and caps, artificial leather, padding and upholstery filling for general use; Various furniture, furnishings, fixtures, children's vehicles; Monuments and tombstones, other stone and metal work, advertising signs and displays; Pianos and organs, musical instrument parts and materials, games, toys and dolls; Pens, mechanical pencils and pen points; artists' materials, jewellery and instrument cases; Various retail, household and service machines; beauty and barber equipment; vacuum cleaners	Art, authors, museums; library operations, photography; lapidary work; Costume renting; manufacture of wigs, toupees, braids and switches; Fur dressing and dyeing; fur storage
6th Order (September 3, 1943)	Extended to all men aged 16 to 40 (inclusive)	As in previous Orders	As in previous Orders
7th Order (November 29, 1943)	As in 6th Order	Insurance; Short term credit, stock brokers, financial institutions other than banks; Real estate (finance and operation); Travel agencies; Year-round hotels (other than for skilled trades); Seasonal hotels, other types of short-term lodging; Millinery, bedspreads, trimmings and embroideries; Various costumes, uniforms and gowns; Washing and polishing of automobiles	

- From September 1, 1943, employers in high-priority industries were prohibited from releasing any of their employees, and such employees were barred from giving notice of separation, without the written permission of a National Selective Service officer, and such controls continued until September 17, 1945.

=== Nature of conscription ===
The Act permitted conscripts (known as "R men" or "zombies") to be used for home defence only and not to be deployed overseas. The "Zombies" were so-called because they were soldiers who could not fight overseas in the war, making them like the zombies of Haitian mythology who were neither dead nor alive, but rather somewhere in-between. In 1942, the Act was amended to remove the prohibition on conscripts serving outside Canada, and the first overseas campaign that NRMA recruits were subsequently involved in was the recapture of the island of Kiska in August 1943. Until November 1944, only those Canadians who had volunteered were sent elsewhere overseas.

The rule prohibiting "Zombies" from being sent to fight overseas was modified after a plebiscite was held on the matter on 27 April 1942 where the majority of people in the 8 English-speaking provinces voted to release Prime Minister William Lyon Mackenzie King from his promise not to send the Zombies overseas. By contrast, Quebec voted by a large majority against overseas conscription in the referendum. As Quebec was the one province that Mackenzie King really wanted to vote yes in the plebiscite, Quebec's non vote placed the prime minister in the dilemma of honoring the wishes of the majority of English Canada vs. alienating the wishes of majority in French Canada. Such an order, authorizing the transfer of 16,000 conscripts to England, was not made until November 1944. This precipitated the Conscription Crisis of 1944, and resulted in several Quebec Liberal MPs leaving the party in protest. 9,667 NRMA recruits were sent to England, of which two-thirds only arrived after V-E Day.

The Zombies were widely disliked and regarded as cowards by the men who had volunteered for overseas service. The Zombies wore a black tie and collared shirt as part of their uniform while volunteers for overseas duties did not. In April 1945 when the men of the First Canadian Army were informed that henceforth they would now wear the Zombie black tie and collared shirt, the writer Farley Mowat serving with the Hastings and Prince Edward Regiment wrote: "the black tie itself was known as the Zombie tie, and the resentment of the volunteers, who were now ordered to wear this symbol of shame, was most outspoken."

== See also ==
- The National Resources Mobilization Act, 1940, S.C. 1940, c. 13
- The National Resources Mobilization Act Amendment Act, 1942, S.C. 1942-1943, c. 29
- "National Resources Mobilization Act". The Canadian Encyclopedia.
