= John Carl Murchie =

Canadian general (1895–1966)

- Born: June 7, 1895; Edmundston, New Brunswick
- Died: March 5, 1966 (aged 70); Ottawa, Ontario
- Military career
- Allegiance: Canada
- Branch: Canadian Army
- Service years: 1912–1945
- Rank: Lieutenant General
- Unit: Royal Regiment of Canadian Artillery
- Commands: Chief of the General Staff
- Conflicts: World War I World War II
- Awards: Companion of the Order of the Bath; Commander of the Order of the British Empire; Canadian Forces' Decoration

Lieutenant General John Carl Murchie CB, CBE, CD (June 7, 1895 – March 5, 1966) was a Canadian soldier and Chief of the General Staff, the head of the Canadian Army, from December 27, 1943, until August 21, 1945.

== Military career ==
Murchie graduated with a Military Qualification certificate from the Royal Military College of Canada in Kingston, Ontario in 1915 during World War I. He served with the Royal Regiment of Canadian Artillery, Canadian Army, in France from 1915 to 1917.

He remained in the army during the interwar period, where he attended the Staff College, Camberley from 1929 to 1930.

He also served in World War II and became a General Staff Officer at National Defence Headquarters in 1939. In 1940 he became Director of Military Operations and in 1941 he was made Director of Military Training & Staff Duties. Later that year he was appointed a Brigadier on the General Staff at Canadian Military Headquarters in England. He then went on to be Vice Chief of the General Staff in 1942. He served as Chief of the General Staff from 1944 until 1945, and retired in 1946.

He was awarded the CBE in the 1943 Birthday Honours list.

Military offices
Preceded by Kenneth Stuart	Chief of the General Staff; 1943–1945	Succeeded by Charles Foulkes
