= Samuel Findlay Clark =

Canadian army officer (1909–1998)

- Born: 1909; Winnipeg, Manitoba, Canada
- Died: 1998 (aged 88–89)
- Military career
- Allegiance: Canada
- Branch: Canadian Army
- Service years: 1933–1961
- Rank: Lieutenant general
- Unit: Royal Canadian Corps of Signals
- Commands: Chief of the General Staff
- Conflicts: World War II
- Awards: Commander of the Order of the British Empire; Canadian Forces' Decoration

Lieutenant General Samuel Findlay Clark CBE, CD (1909–1998) was a senior Canadian Army officer who became Chief of the General Staff (CGS), the professional head of the Canadian Army, from 1958 until 1961.

== Education ==
Clark received his early education in Winnipeg and attended the University of Manitoba, graduating with a degree in electrical engineering (BSc EE) in 1932. He subsequently attended the University of Saskatchewan to obtain a degree in mechanical engineering (BSc ME) in 1933.

== Career ==
He enrolled in the Canadian Army in 1933, joining the Royal Canadian Corps of Signals as a lieutenant.

In 1938, he was promoted to captain and posted to the Royal Military College of Canada (RMC) as an associate professor of electrical and mechanical engineering. At the time, Harry Crerar was the RMC commandant and Guy Simonds was the commander of a cadet company. He was appointed adjutant of the I Canadian Corps Signals.

He served in World War II, initially as commanding officer of 5th Canadian Armoured Division Signals Regiment, and from 1942 as a general staff officer at Canadian Military Headquarters in London. In 1943 he was made chief signals officer at the headquarters of II Canadian Corps and served in North West Europe.

In 1945 he became Deputy Chief of the General Staff in Ottawa before becoming a member of the Military Committee of the Western European Union and then of NATO. He became Quartermaster-General of the Canadian Army in 1951 and general officer commanding Central Command at Oakville, Ontario in 1955. He was appointed Chief of the General Staff in 1958.

== Retirement ==
From until 1 October 1968 until 24 March 1973, Clark served as colonel commandant of the new Communications and Electronics Branch. He died in 1998.

Military offices
Preceded by Howard Douglas Graham	Chief of the General Staff; 1958–1961	Succeeded by Geoffrey Walsh
