= 7th Canadian Infantry Brigade =

Brigade of the Canadian Army

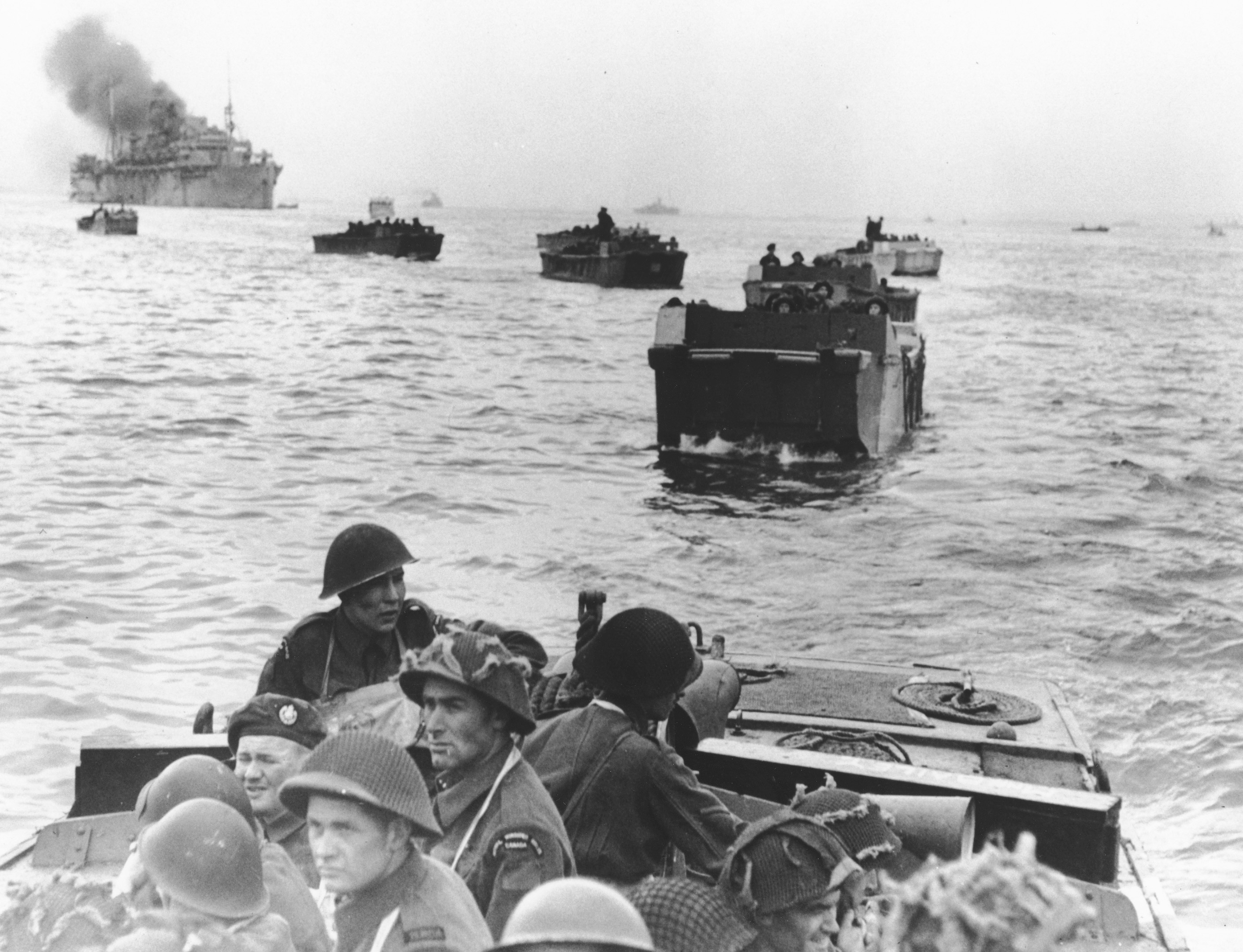
- Canadian soldiers aboard LCAs headed for Juno Beach
- Active: 1915–1918; 1940–1946
- Country: Canada
- Branch: Canadian Army
- Type: Infantry
- Size: Brigade
- Part of: 3rd Canadian Infantry Division
- Nickname: "Water Rats"
- Engagements: World War I: Western Front; World War II: Juno Beach; Normandy landings; Battle of Normandy; Battle of the Scheldt

Commanders
- Notable commanders: Archibald Cameron Macdonell; H. L. N. Salmon; Harry Wickwire Foster

Insignia
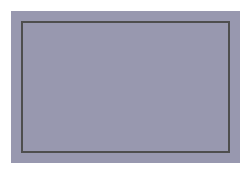
- Formation patch
- Abbreviation: 7th Can Inf Bde

The 7th Canadian Infantry Brigade was an infantry brigade of the Canadian Army that fought during World War I and World War II. The brigade, along with the 8th Canadian Infantry Brigade and the 9th Canadian Infantry Brigade, formed the 3rd Canadian Infantry Division. The division was formed in late 1915 in France and served on the Western Front until the armistice in November 1918. Later, during World War II, it arrived in the United Kingdom in 1940 and spent three years in garrison duties and training in preparation for the assault landings on Juno Beach in Normandy on 6 June 1944. After fighting in Normandy, the brigade took part in the Battle of the Scheldt. After the war, it served on occupation duties until being disbanded in June 1946.

== Units ==
=== World War I ===
- The Royal Canadian Regiment: December 1915 – 11 November 1918;
- Princess Patricia's Canadian Light Infantry: 24 December 1915 – 11 November 1918;
- 42nd (Royal Highlanders) Battalion Canadian Infantry: December 1915 – 11 November 1918;
- 49th (Edmonton) Battalion Canadian Infantry: December 1915 – 11 November 1918.

=== World War II ===
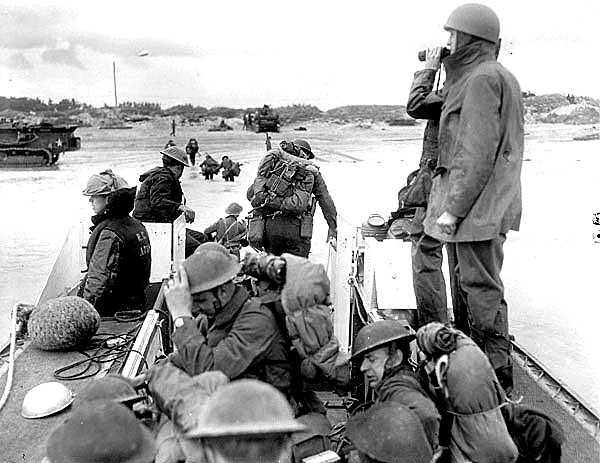
Canadian soldiers landing on Juno Beach from LCAs

- Headquarters, 7th Infantry Brigade, C.A.S.F.
- 1st Battalion, The Royal Winnipeg Rifles, C.A.S.F.
- 1st Battalion, The Regina Rifle Regiment, C.A.S.F.
- 1st Battalion, The Canadian Scottish Regiment, C.A.S.F.
- 7th Infantry Brigade Ground Defence Platoon (Lorne Scots), C.A.S.F. (Added 7 April 1941)
- 7th Infantry Anti-Tank Company, C.A.S.F. (Deleted 5 February 1941)

== History ==
=== World War I ===
Formed from excess Canadian soldiers in depots in France, the 7th Brigade was formed as part of the 3rd Canadian Division in late 1915. Its first major action came around Mount Sorrell in June 1916, after which it fought in most of the battles that the Canadians took part in until the armistice in November 1918. The brigade's first commander was Brigadier-General Archibald Macdonell. It had four infantry battalions, of which one (Princess Patricia's Canadian Light Infantry) had previous trench warfare experience, while the other three were freshly raised. The brigade was supported by a machine gun company and a trench mortar battery.

=== World War II ===
7th Canadian Infantry Brigade was authorized to form on 24 May 1940. However, it only actually formed on 14 September 1940 through the creation of its brigade headquarters and being assigned its first brigadier. The brigade was assigned to the 3rd Canadian Infantry Division. Consisting of three infantry battalions, the brigade embarked for the United Kingdom in August 1941, arriving in September. After this, the brigade spent three years undertaking garrison duties and training. Its first combat assignment came on 6 June 1944, when it was assigned to assault on Juno Beach.

==== Juno Beach, D-Day ====
Juno Beach was 5 miles (8 km) wide and stretched on either side of Courseulles-sur-Mer. The 3rd Canadian Infantry Division was the assault division, along with the 2nd Canadian Armoured Brigade under command to provide armoured support for the infantry assault brigades. The 7th Canadian Infantry Brigade, commanded by Brigadier Harry Wickwire Foster, had been selected to take part in the initial assault. They landed on the left-hand side of the beach, supported by the 6th Armoured Regiment (1st Hussars). During the assault, the Regina Rifles landed at Courseulles, which had the code name Nan Green beach, and the Royal Winnipeg Rifles landed on the western edge of Courseulles, which had the code names Mike Red beach and Mike Green beach.

So far, not a shot has been fired from the defenders on the beach. Will it be a push-over? We soon have the answer in the form of machine-gun fire and shells from pillboxes which are apparently still open for business despite the terrific pounding they have taken. The LCA's of the leading companies and the tanks of the 1st Hussars are working into the beaches now. H-hour has arrived. For the purposes of the assault, Courseulles had been divided into blocks numbered one to twelve. Each was to be cleared by a designated company. Careful study of enlarged air photos showing the sites of enemy strong points had made the ground itself easily recognizable. Every foot of the town was known before it was entered.

— Major Gordon Baird, The Regina Rifle Regiment 1939–1945

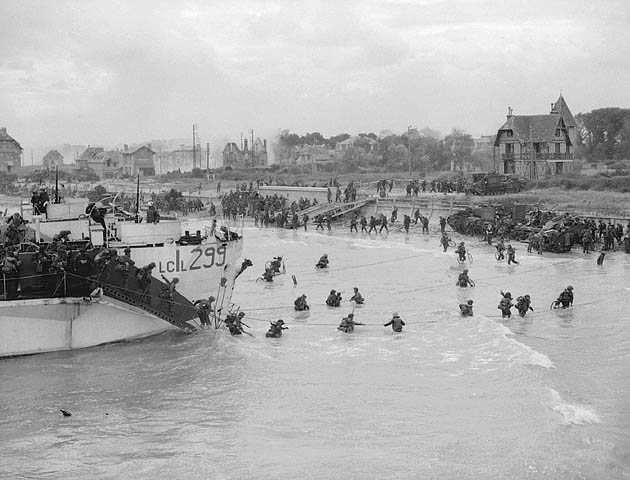
Canadian troops land at Bernières-sur-Mer

In the first hour of the assault on Juno Beach, the Canadian forces suffered approximately 50% casualty rates, comparable to those suffered by the Americans at Omaha Beach. Once the Canadians cleared the seawall (about an hour after leaving the landing craft transports) they started to advance quickly inland and had a much easier time subduing the German defences than the Americans at Omaha had. By noon, the entire 3rd Canadian Division was ashore and leading elements had pushed several kilometres inland to seize bridges over the Seulles River. By 6 pm they had captured the town of Saint-Aubin-sur-Mer. By the end of D-Day, the elements of the 3rd Canadian Infantry Division had penetrated farther into France than any other Allied force, though counter-attacks by two German armoured divisions would stop any further movement for several weeks.

Of the first day, Graves writes: "None of the assault divisions, including 3rd Canadian Division, had managed to secure their D-Day objectives, which lay inland, although the Canadians came closer than any other Allied formation." By the end of the next day, the Canadian forces had linked up with the British forces that had landed at Sword Beach.

==== Battle of Normandy ====
On 8 June, SS-Panzergrenadier-Regiment 26 under command of SS-Obersturmbannfuhrer Wilhelm Mohnke arrived on the battlefield. Their orders were to drive over the Canadians and force a deep wedge between them and the British division to the west. The attack was launched at 03:30 but had little initial success. The various companies in the attacking 12th SS Panzer Division failed to co-ordinate their moves towards the Canadians, and, despite heavy casualties during repeated attempts by the infantry, Canadian artillery and supporting heavy machine guns of the Cameron Highlanders of Ottawa took a heavy toll on each attacking company of SS troops. The Regina Rifle Regiment held its ground and the I Battalion fell back.

On the Canadian right, the II Battalion attacked the Royal Winnipeg Rifles defending the village of Putot-en-Bessin. The battalion managed to break into the village and surround several companies, effectively pushing the Winnipegs out of the village, inflicting 256 casualties – of which 175 were taken prisoner. A counter-attack launched at 20:30 by the Canadian Scottish Regiment, however, regained Putot-en-Bessin, and the II Battalion withdrew and dug in south of the village. Following the battle, SS-Aufklärungs-Abteilung 12 deployed to the west of Mohnke's regiment and, by the evening of 8 June the division, while having failed in its assignment to drive the Canadians into the sea, had effectively halted the units of the 3rd Canadian Infantry Division, in the Allied advance on Caen.

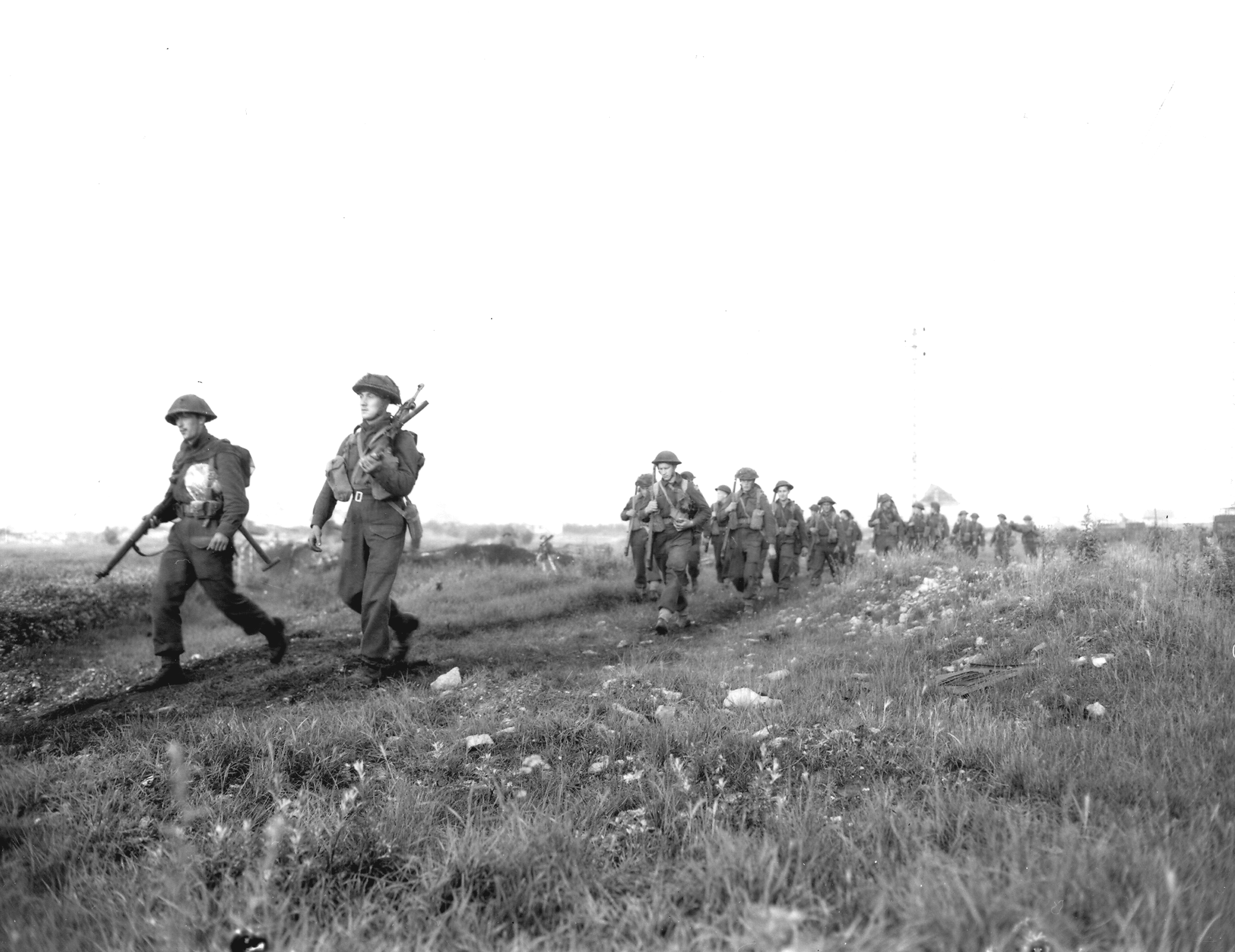
Men of the Royal Winnipeg Rifles on the march in Normandy, July 1944.

Spending much of the next four weeks in static positions, the division participated in the battles to capture Caen in early July, known as Operation Charnwood, followed by Operation Totalize and Operation Tractable and the battles around Verrières Ridge, during the rest of the month. The brigade then took part in the pursuit across France and cleared the Channel ports, most notably Boulogne, Calais and Cape Gris Nez.

==== Battle of the Scheldt: Operation Switchback ====
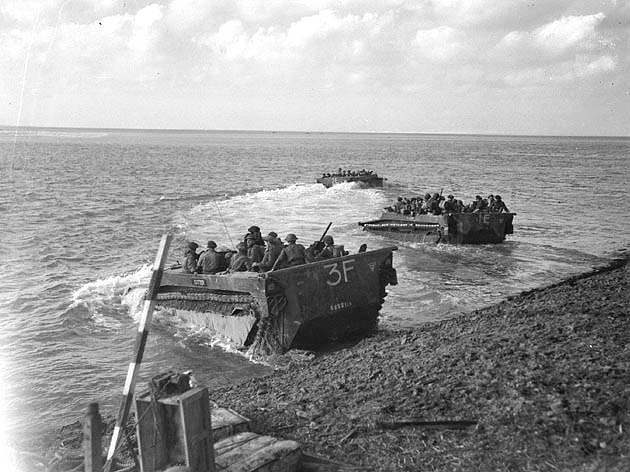
Amphibious vehicles taking Canadians across the Scheldt.

The second main operation of the Battle of the Scheldt opened with fierce fighting to reduce the Breskens pocket. Here, the 3rd Canadian Infantry Division encountered tenacious German resistance as they fought to cross the Leopold Canal. It was decided that the best place for an assault would be immediately east of where the two canals divided: a narrow strip of dry ground only a few hundred metres wide at its base beyond the Leopold Canal (described as a long triangle with its base on the Maldegem-Aardenburg road and its apex near the village of Moershoofd some five kilometres east).

A two-pronged assault commenced. The 7th Canadian Infantry Brigade made the initial assault across the Leopold Canal, while the 9th Canadian Infantry Brigade mounted an amphibious attack from the northern or coastal side of the pocket. The assault began on October 6, supported by extensive artillery and Canadian-built Wasp Universal Carriers, which were equipped with flamethrowers. The Wasps launched their barrage of flame across the Leopold Canal, allowing the 7th Brigade troops to scramble up over the steep banks and launch their assault boats. Two precarious, separate footholds were established, but the enemy recovered from the shock of the flamethrowers and counter-attacked, though they were unable to move the Canadians from their extremely vulnerable bridgeheads. By October 9, the gap between the bridgeheads was closed, and by early morning on October 12, a position had been gained across the Aardenburg road.

The 3rd Division fought additional actions to clear German troops from the towns of Breskens, Oostburg, Zuidzande and Cadzand, as well as the coastal fortress Fort Frederik Hendrik. Operation Switchback ended on November 3 when the First Canadian Army liberated the Belgian towns of Knokke and Zeebrugge, officially closing the Breskens Pocket and eliminating all German forces south of the Scheldt. After spending three months in static positions in the Nijmegen Salient, the division engaged in fierce combat once more in February. Fighting once again through flooded terrain, the brigade helped clear the last German positions west of the Rhine. The brigade then fought into Germany and was ordered to suspend operations on 4 May 1945.

==== Occupation duties and disbandment ====
It was disbanded on 23 November 1945, but duplicated and re-raised for occupation duties in Germany. These came to an end when the 2nd/7th brigade was disbanded along with the rest of the 3rd Division (CAOF) in June 1946.

== Brigade Commanders during the Second World War ==
- Brigadier W.G. Colquhoun: 14 September 1940 – 9 June 1941
- Brigadier H.L.N. Salmon: 10 June 1941 – 7 September 1942
- Brigadier H.D. Graham: 8 September 1942 – 14 January 1943
- Brigadier H.W. Foster: 15 January – 8 June 1943 (First Tenure)
- Lieutenant Colonel J.M. Meldram: 9 – 22 June 1943 (Acting Brigade Commander)
- Brigadier C.C. Mann: 23 June 1943 – 27 January 1944
- Brigadier H.W. Foster: 28 January – 21 August 1944 (Second Tenure)
- Lieutenant Colonel F.N. Cabeldu: 22 – 25 August 1944 (Acting Brigade Commander)
- Brigadier J.G. Spragge: 26 August 1944 – 23 February 1945
- Brigadier T.G. Gibson: 24 February – 3 June 1945
- (Position Vacant / under Acting Command): 4 June – 23 November 1945 (Disbanded)

== See also ==
- Military history of Canada during the Second World War
- Military history of Canada
- Canadian Forces
