= Geoffrey Walsh =

Canadian Army general (1909–1999)

- Born: 19 August 1909; Brantford, Ontario, Canada
- Died: 3 April 1999 (aged 89); Ottawa, Ontario, Canada
- Military career
- Allegiance: Canada
- Branch: Canadian Army / Canadian Forces
- Service years: 1930-1965
- Rank: Lieutenant General
- Unit: Royal Canadian Engineers
- Commands: Chief of the General Staff
- Conflicts: World War II
- Awards: Commander of the Order of the British Empire; Distinguished Service Order; Canadian Forces' Decoration; Legion of Merit

Lieutenant-General Geoffrey Walsh, CBE, DSO, CD (19 August 1909 – 3 April 1999) was a Canadian soldier and Chief of the General Staff, the head of the Canadian Army from 1961 – 1964; Walsh was the last officer to hold this appointment as it was eliminated in 1964 as part of the reorganization of Canada's military in the lead-up to the 1968 unification of the Canadian Forces. The most senior army appointment after unification, the Commander of Mobile Command, had a much-reduced scope of authority.

== Military career ==
Educated at St Catherine's Collegiate School, Walsh was commissioned into the Royal Canadian Engineers in 1930.

He served in World War II with the Canadian Army Service Force and took part in the Spitsbergen Raid in 1941. In 1942 he transferred to the 1st Canadian Division and fought in Sicily and Italy. In 1944 he was made Commander Royal Engineers (CRE) for 4th Canadian (Armoured) Division. and he later became CRE with II Canadian Corps, commanded by Guy Simonds, which took part in Operation Overlord.

After the war he was appointment Commander, Eastern Ontario Area, followed by Commander, 27th Brigade before his appointment as Director-General of Military Training. In 1955 he was appointed Quartermaster-General of the Canadian Army and in 1959 he became General Officer Commanding, Western Command. In 1961 he was made Chief of the General Staff and in 1964, became Vice Chief of the Defence Staff.

== Family ==
In 1935, he married Gwynn Abigail Currie with whom he had one son.

Military offices
Preceded by Samuel Clark	Chief of the General Staff; 1961–1964	Succeeded by Jean Allard (as Commander Mobile Command)
Preceded by Creation of position	Vice Chief of the Defence Staff; 1964–1965	Succeeded by Robert Moncel
