= 1st Canadian Infantry Brigade =

Brigade of the Canadian Army

1st Canadian Brigade 1st Canadian Infantry Brigade
- Active: 1914–1919; 1939–1945
- Country: Canada
- Branch: Canadian Army
- Type: Infantry
- Size: Brigade
- Part of: 1st Canadian Division
- Engagements: World War I: Second Battle of Ypres; Battle of the Somme; Battle of Vimy Ridge; Battle of Passchendaele; World War II: Invasion of Sicily; Italian campaign

Commanders
- Notable commanders: Malcolm Mercer; William Antrobus Griesbach

The 1st Canadian Infantry Brigade was a Canadian Army formation that served with the 1st Canadian Division in World Wars I and II. In 1953 it was reformed in Germany to become the 1 Canadian Mechanized Brigade Group in 1992.

William Antrobus Griesbach commanded the brigade in 1918.

== Order of Battle ==
=== World War I ===
- 1st Canadian Battalion (Ontario Regiment), CEF. August 1914 – November 11, 1918;
- 2nd Canadian Battalion (Eastern Ontario Regiment), CEF. August 1914 – November 11, 1918;
- 3rd Canadian Battalion (Toronto Regiment), CEF. August 1914 – November 11, 1918;
- 4th (Central Ontario) Battalion, CEF. August 1914 – November 11, 1918.

=== World War II ===
- Headquarters, 1st Infantry Brigade, C.A.S.F.
- 1st Battalion, The Royal Canadian Regiment, C.A.S.F.
- 1st Battalion, The Hastings and Prince Edward Regiment, C.A.S.F.
- 1st Battalion, The 48th Highlanders of Canada, C.A.S.F.
- 1st Infantry Brigade Ground Defence Platoon (Lorne Scots), C.A.S.F. (Added 6 February 1941)
- 1st Infantry Anti-Tank Company, C.A.S.F. (Deleted 5 February 1941)

=== Post-1945 ===
The brigade was re-established on 14 October 1953 in Europe.

- 1st Canadian Infantry Brigade created 14 October 1953
- Redesignated 1st Canadian Infantry Brigade Group in October 1955
- Redesignated 1 Combat Group in 1972
- Redesignated 1 Canadian Brigade Group in 1976
- Redesignated 1 Canadian Mechanized Brigade Group in 1992

== Brigade Commanders during the Second World War ==
- Brigadier A.A. Smith: 17 October 1939 – 19 October 1940 (Wounded in car accident)
- Lieutenant Colonel V. Hodson: 20 October – 26 November 1940 (Acting Commander)
- Lieutenant Colonel J.B. Stevenson: 27 November – 29 December 1940 (Acting Commander)
- Lieutenant Colonel L.T. Lowther: 30 December 1940 – 21 February 1941 (Acting Commander)
- Brigadier J.H. Roberts: 22 February – 15 July 1941
- Lieutenant Colonel W.W. Southam: 16 – 30 July 1941 (Acting Commander)
- Brigadier R.F.L. Keller: 31 July 1941 – 7 September 1942
- Brigadier G.G. Simonds: 8 September 1942 – 14 January 1943
- Brigadier H.D. Graham: 15 January – 17 December 1943
- Brigadier D.C. Spry: 18 December 1943 – 12 July 1944
- Brigadier J.A. Calder: 13 July – 8 December 1944
- Brigadier J.D.B. Smith: 9 December 1944 – 2 June 1945
- Lieutenant Colonel G.E.B. Renison: 3 June – 15 September 1945 (Disbanded) (Acting Commander)
