= General O'Donnell =

General O'Donnell may refer to:

- Emmett O'Donnell Jr. (1906–1971), U.S. Air Force four-star general
- Enrique O'Donnell, Conde de La Bisbal (1769–1834), Spanish Army captain general
- Joseph O'Donnell (younger) (1768–1836), Spanish Army captain general
- Karl O'Donnell (1715–1771), Austrian Army general in the Seven Years' War
- Lawrence O'Donnell (general) (1933–2026), Australian Army lieutenant general
- Leopoldo O'Donnell (1809–1867), Spanish Army captain general
- Patrick O'Donnell (Canadian general) (1940–2015), Canadian Forces lieutenant general
