= H. L. N. Salmon =

Canadian general

H.L.N "Harry" Salmon
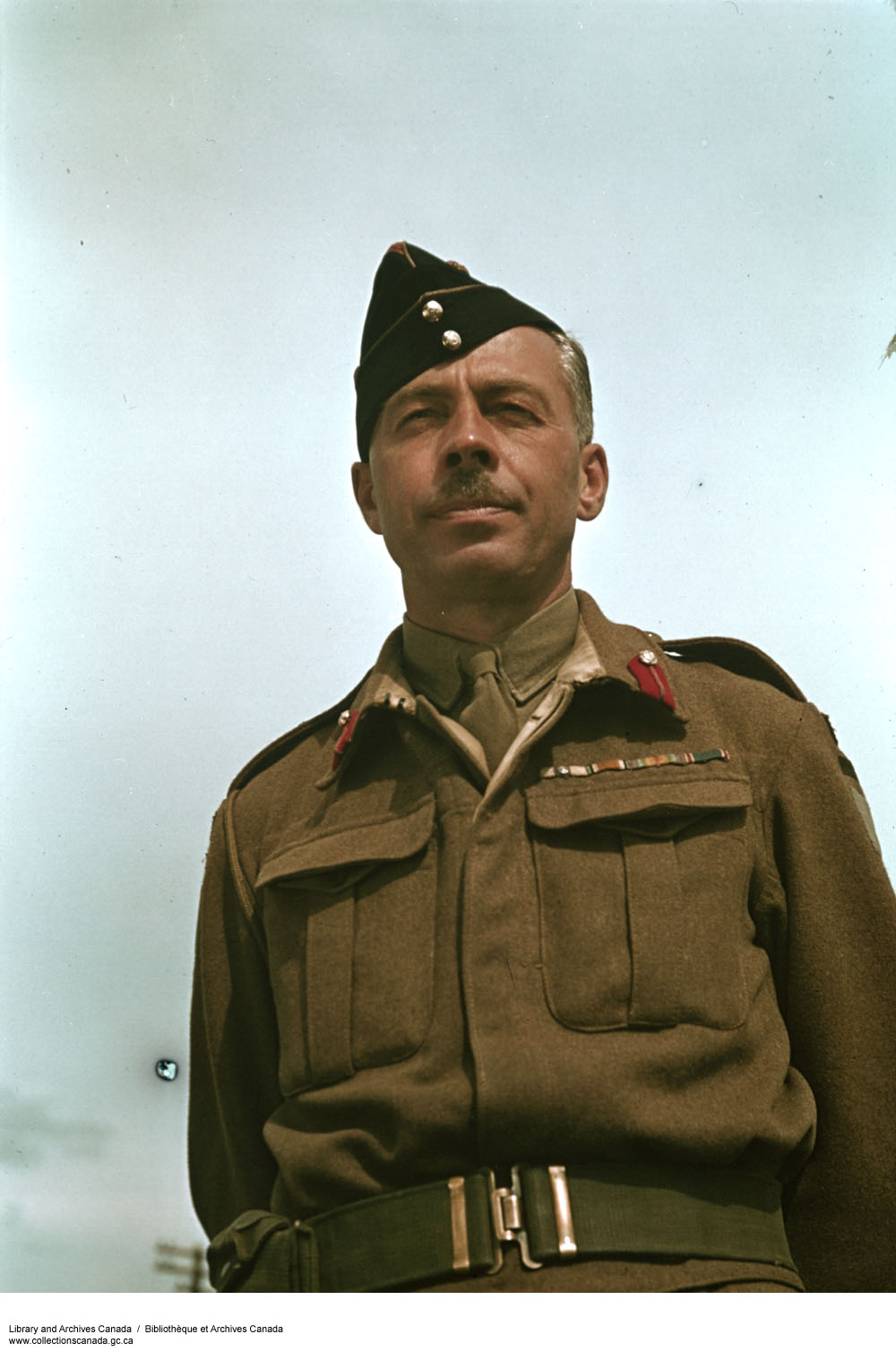
- Major General Harry Salmon, pictured here in 1943.
- Born: February 9, 1894; Winnipeg, Manitoba, Canada
- Died: April 29, 1943 (aged 49); RAF Chivenor, England (airplane crash)
- Burial place: Brookwood Military Cemetery, Surrey, England
- Relatives: Nowell Salmon grand-uncle
- Military career
- Allegiance: Canada
- Branch: Canadian Army
- Service years: 1914–1943
- Rank: Major General
- Unit: The Royal Canadian Regiment
- Commands: 1st Canadian Infantry Division; 7th Canadian Infantry Brigade; The Hastings and Prince Edward Regiment
- Conflicts: World War I World War II
- Awards: Military Cross (and Bar)

Major General Harry Leonard Nowell Salmon MC & Bar (February 9, 1894 – April 29, 1943) was a senior officer of the Canadian Army who fought in both World War I and World War II.

== Early life and military career ==
Harry Salmon was born in Winnipeg, Manitoba, on February 9, 1894, son of John and Louise Salmon, one of three boys and three girls. After attending St. John's College in Winnipeg, he took a position in the employ of the Cockshutt Plow Company as a clerk. While civilian administrative life wasn't to be his for long, his brief experience would serve him well in later years.

Enlisting in the Canadian Army at the age of twenty, his military career began in 1914 with the 95th Saskatchewan Rifles out of Regina, though he was soon assigned to the 28th Battalion, another western Canadian unit. He served with distinction in the First World War, spending from 1915 to 1919 in Europe. During this era of trench warfare, he was involved as the first tanks lumbered across no-man's land marking the emergence of mechanized fighting forces.

While with the 28th Battalion, Salmon was caught up in the bloody deadlocked period of the war in northern France around the Somme and Ypres. His participation was anything but ordinary and he was to be decorated twice for gallantry, receiving the Military Cross and Bar.

His first commendation was in October 1916, recognizing his contribution in a brutal battle of September 1915 in Courcelette, where he had rallied his men after the platoon's officer was killed. The citation for the medal reads:

For conspicuous gallantry in action. He led his men into action with great courage, and although severely wounded he continued to lead his men until the objective was reached. He set a fine example to his men.

He was thereafter hospitalized and out of commission for months with a shrapnel wound that pierced his chest and lung.

On November 6, 1917, in what has been called the third battle of Ypres, the 28th was tasked with an objective that would help break the multi-year deadlock around Passchendaele. During this operation, 'D' company was charged with penetrating through the attack to seize the objective, and overcome enemy lines. Heavy losses were suffered, including the commander of 'D' company, whereupon Lieutenant Salmon MC assumed command and pushed forward to achieve the objective. The stalemate that had cost an estimated quarter of a million Allied casualties ended with the offensive that day. The war diary for the battalion reads simply – D company with two platoons under Lieut. Salmon holding the line.

Salmon continued to see service in the war, receiving a bar to his MC in January 1918. The bar's citation appeared in The London Gazette in April and reads as follows:

For conspicuous gallantry and devotion to duty. On his company commander becoming a casualty during an attack, he immediately took charge of the company, which he led to the final objective with great skill and courage, directing the consolidation and organisation for the defence under very heavy enemy fire. He was constantly up and down the line, encouraging and inspiring the men. Though twice buried by shell fire and badly shaken, he nevertheless continued his duties without assistance. His devotion to duty was most outstanding, and his courage and gallantry were of the highest order.

== Interwar period ==
Between the wars, from 1920 to 1929, he performed regimental duty with The Royal Canadian Regiment and served in staff appointments. During this period he also attended the Staff College, Camberley, in England, from 1930−1931.

== Second World War ==
He joined the staff of the 1st Canadian Infantry Division in January 1940, attaining rank of Lt. Col. in February of that year, and commanding the Hastings and Prince Edward Regiment (colloquially known as the "Hasty P's"). Following the disaster at Dunkirk which culminated on June 4, Lt. Col. Salmon led the Hasty P's in a June 16 operation to Brest, France to assist in the withdrawal of the Canadian elements of the second British Expeditionary Force (BEF). The next day, as word was received that Paris had fallen, and just a week before the Armistice of 22 June 1940, Salmon's regiment began a brief expedition to engage the rapidly moving invasion that was sweeping into France. Events moved unpredictably fast and the unit was soon ordered to return to England along with the British Expeditionary Force. While aboard ship awaiting departure to Plymouth, the regiment engaged with harassing German aircraft. They were later credited with being the first Canadian soldiers to bring down a German aircraft during the war, as the eager troops fired their first shots at a low flying plane that attempted an opportunistic attack of the harbour.

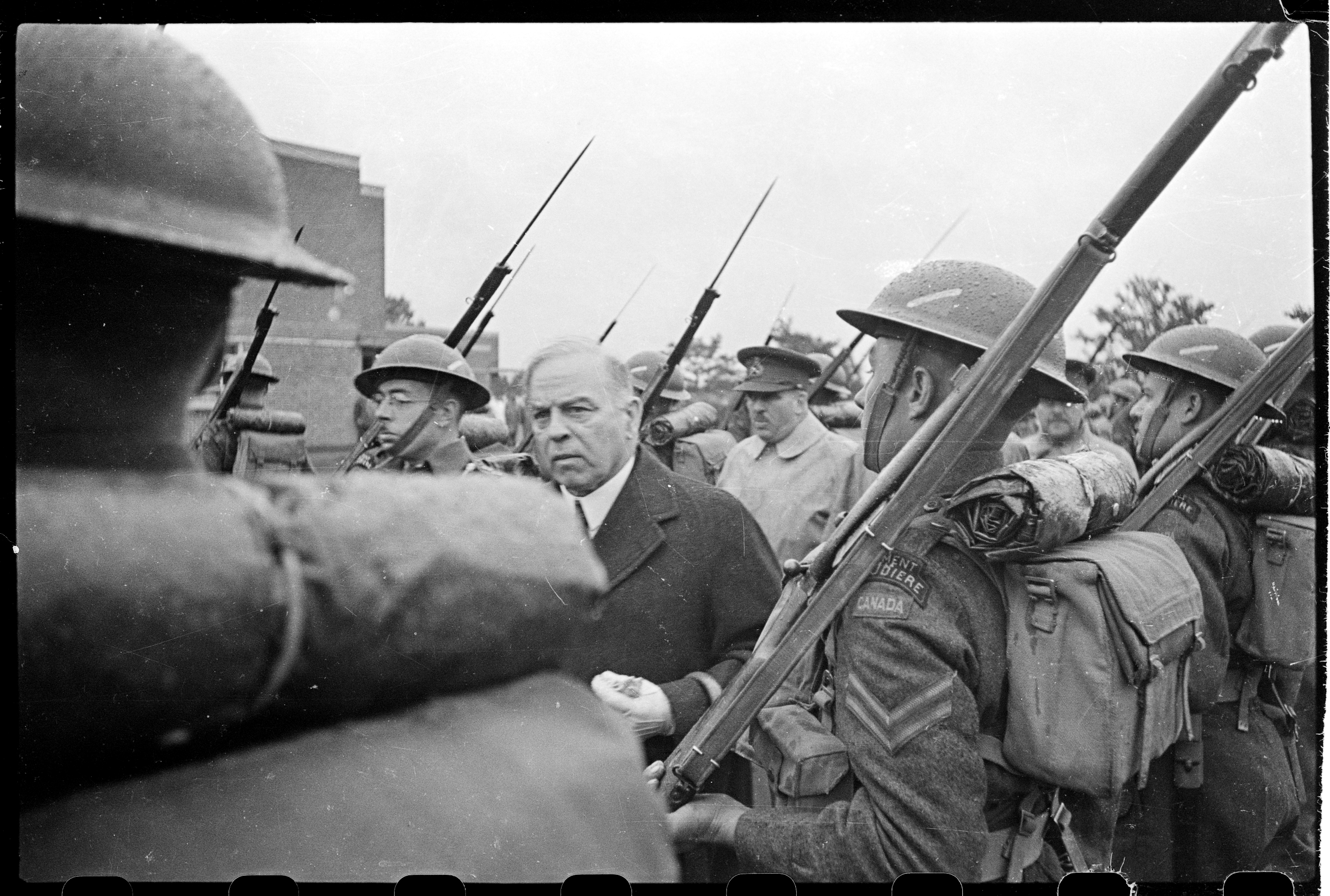
Lieutenant Colonel Harry Salmon and the Canadian Prime Minister, William Lyon Mackenzie King, inspect troops at Redhill near Aldershot, Hampshire, August 1941.

On September 8, 1942, when Lieutenant-General Andrew McNaughton, the commander of the First Canadian Army, chose Salmon to take over command of 1st Canadian Division (he was at the time leading the 7th Canadian Infantry Brigade of the 3rd Canadian Infantry Division). Accounts at the time recorded his reputation as "one of the best trainers of soldiers in any army". In their first overseas deployment since the First World War, the role for the 1st Cdn Div in England was to develop and execute exercises in preparation to repel a possible Nazi invasion of the south coast of England near Eastbourne.

In 1943 Salmon was appointed to head the Canadian involvement in Operation Husky, the allied invasion of Sicily which would be part of the push that brought about the end of the war. A planning staff was built around Salmon in Norfolk House, where some of the highest members of the Allied staff were situated. On April 29, 1943, Salmon, along with other important participants prepared to embark for a meeting in Cairo. The aircraft was scheduled to embark from Hendon Airfield in north London, landing in Portreath and from there making the way around occupied Europe to attend the meeting. Weather was bad in Portreath and this was communicated to No. 24 Squadron RAF at Hendon. It was decided to instead go to RAF Chivenor where the weather was also poor but manageable. The Hudson IIIA aircraft embarked and was seen approaching for a landing on the East–West runway at Chivenor, when the aircraft stalled and crashed, killing all on board. Major-General Guy Simonds took over command of the 1st Canadian Division and led the Canadian forces in operation Husky. Simonds had briefly held the command of 2nd Canadian Division and was transferred to the 1st Division after Salmon's death.

== Family History ==
The "Nowell" in Salmon's name is an acknowledgement of an ancestor prominent in British military service. His grandfather's brother Nowell Salmon served with the Royal Navy, rising to the rank of Admiral of the Fleet. He received the Victoria Cross for his gallantry during the relief of Lucknow during the Indian Rebellion in November 1857. Nowell Salmon's maternal grandfather (H.L.N. Salmon's great-great-grandfather) was Admiral Nowell who had served the Royal Navy at the Battle of the Saintes and in the American Revolutionary War.

Military offices
Preceded by George Pearkes	GOC 1st Canadian Infantry Division; 1942–1943	Succeeded by Guy Simonds
