= Guy Simonds =

Canadian general (1903–1974)

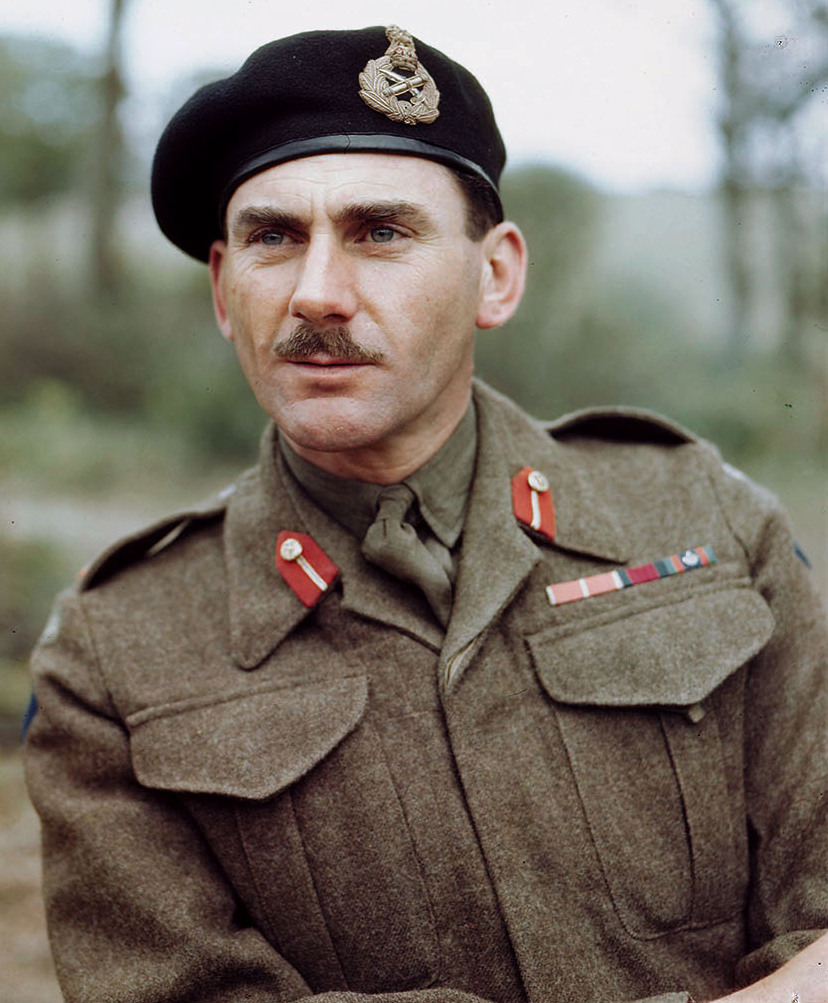
- Born: April 23, 1903; Ixworth, near Bury St Edmunds, Suffolk, England
- Died: May 15, 1974 (aged 71); Toronto, Ontario, Canada
- Burial place: Mount Pleasant Cemetery, Toronto
- Military career
- Allegiance: Canada
- Branch: Canadian Army
- Service years: 1926–1960
- Rank: Lieutenant General
- Unit: Royal Canadian Horse Artillery
- Commands: Chief of the General Staff; Canadian Army Command and Staff College; National Defence College, Canada; II Canadian Corps; 5th Canadian Armoured Division; 1st Canadian Infantry Division; 2nd Canadian Infantry Division; 1st Canadian Infantry Brigade st Field Regiment, Royal Canadian Artillery
- Conflicts: World War II; Korean War
- Awards: Companion of the Order of Canada; Companion of the Order of the Bath; Commander of the Order of the British Empire; Distinguished Service Order; Canadian Forces' Decoration; Silver Cross of the Virtuti Militari (Poland); Commander of the Legion of Merit (United States); Commander of the Legion of Honour (France); Commander of the Order of Orange-Nassau (Netherlands); Commander of the Order of Leopold (Belgium)

Lieutenant-General Guy Granville Simonds, CC, CB, CBE, DSO, CD (April 23, 1903 – May 15, 1974) was a senior Canadian Army officer who served with distinction during World War II. Acknowledged by many military historians and senior commanders, among them Sir Max Hastings and Field Marshal Sir Bernard Montgomery, as one of the best Canadian generals of the war, Simonds, after serving the first few years of the Second World War mainly as a staff officer, commanded the 1st Canadian Infantry Division with distinction in Sicily and Italy from July 1943 until January 1944, and later II Canadian Corps during the Battle of Normandy from June−August 1944 and throughout the subsequent campaign in Western Europe from 1944, towards the end of which he temporarily commanded the First Canadian Army during the Battle of the Scheldt, until victory in Europe Day in May 1945. The historian J. L. Granatstein states about Simonds: "No Canadian commander rose higher and faster in the Second World War, and none did as well in action. Simonds owed his success wholly to his own abilities and efforts—and those of the men who served under him".

After the end of the war, he went to the Imperial Defence College (IDC) in London, initially as a student and later as an instructor, before returning to Canada to command the National Defence College. In 1951, at the age of just 48, he was appointed Chief of the General Staff (CGS), the head of the Canadian Army, a post he held for four years, including during the Korean War, before retiring in 1955.

== Family background ==
Guy was born in Ixworth, near Bury St Edmunds, Suffolk, England on April 24, 1903.

Simonds came from a military family: his great-grandfather had been in the army of the Honourable East India Company, his grandfather had been a major-general in the British Indian Army and his father an officer in the British Army's Royal Regiment of Artillery. The Simonds family was related to Ivor Maxse and Lord Milner. On his maternal side, his grandfather William Easton was a wealthy Virginian horse breeder, who had moved to England, renting Ixworth Abbey. Eleanor "Nellie" Easton, his mother, was one of five daughters, four of whom married army officers.

His father Cecil, a major, resigned from the British Army in fall 1911 (when Guy was 8) and moved his family to British Columbia, working as a surveyor for a railway. Cecil's expectations of having his own survey company were frustrated by the requirement to pass local professional examinations. Re-joining the army at the start of World War I, Cecil was wounded in 1918, and demobilized in 1919 with the rank of colonel. The family spent the war in a rented house in Victoria. Guy's mother sold family possessions to make ends meet. Guy had to quit school for two years at age fourteen to help support the family. Graham speculates that the period of fatherlessness made him a "loner" and self-reliant.

Simonds had three siblings, Cicely, Peter and Eric. Eric (anecdotally an excellent rifle shot, having won prizes at Bisley) became a test pilot, but died in an air accident off Felixstowe in July 1937 in a Miles Magister while serving with the A&AEE in England. Cicely worked as a secretary in the Admiralty during the war. She and her daughter were killed by a V-1 (flying bomb) attack in June 1944, during World War II.

== Education and early military career ==
Simonds attended Collegiate School for Boys in Victoria and then Ashbury College in Ottawa beginning in 1919. The college's dining hall is named after him.

He studied at the Royal Military College of Canada in Kingston, Ontario between 1921 and 1925, cadet number 1596. Simonds' class was the last to be selected from nationwide exams (Simonds having been placed second) and the first after the recently ended First World War to enter a four-year course. At graduation he was awarded the Sword of Honour, judged the best "all rounder", placed second academically, and was generally considered the best horseman in the class.

He joined the Canadian Militia and was commissioned in 1925 as a second lieutenant into the Royal Regiment of Canadian Artillery, serving first with B Battery of the Royal Canadian Horse Artillery in Kingston, then C Battery in Winnipeg. In September 1932 (just weeks after his wedding) with the rank of brevet captain, he attended the Long Gunnery Staff Course in England. He was accompanied to England by his wife, and his first child was born there. He returned to Kingston in 1934. In 1936 and 1937 he attended the Staff College, Camberley in England. Major-General Lord Gort was the commandant at the time, although he was soon replaced by Major-General Sir Ronald Adam, while the instructors included Lieutenant Colonel William Slim. Simonds worked extremely hard and thoroughly enjoyed his time there and he was deemed by his superiors to have been one of the outstanding students on the two-year course. Furthermore, had he been a British officer, he would have been specially selected for an accelerated promotion in order that he might return to the college to serve as an instructor. This was not to be, however.

Promoted to major, he returned to the Royal Military College of Canada as an associate professor of artillery and later as instructor in tactics. The college's commandant at the time was Brigadier Harry Crerar, a fellow gunner officer who was to play a significant part in Simonds's future military career, and under whom he had served towards the end of the 1920s. Historian J.L. Granatstein writes of the two men:

The two were not friends — a major and a brigadier could not be friends — but the older man developed some sense of Simonds's worth. That would be important in the war that began for Canada on 10 September 1939.

During the pre-war years, Simonds and E. L. M. Burns, a future corps commander, debated concepts in the pages of Canadian Defence Quarterly.

== Second World War ==
=== United Kingdom 1939−1943 ===
On September 10, 1939 Canada declared war on Nazi Germany and officially entered the Second World War. Almost immediately Simonds received orders to report to Ottawa where he was appointed to the newly raised 1st Canadian Infantry Division, as its General Staff Officer Grade 2 (GSO2). His first duties as GSO2 were to supervise the operations and training of the division, as well as for its organization and equipment. Together with most of the rest of the division, Simonds went overseas to the United Kingdom in December 1939.

There his job was to consume him in the weeks and months ahead, so much so that he scarcely wrote to his wife, Kay. Colonel Ernest William Sansom, a fellow officer in the 1st Division, had heard about Kay's misgivings about never hearing from her husband, wrote to his wife, stating that he was not surprised, and claimed that Simonds, "is working very hard and doing an excellent job as GSO II."

Simonds's job brought him into frequent contact with the 1st Division's General Officer Commanding (GOC), "Andy" McNaughton, a fellow gunner officer who had previously been Chief of the General Staff (CGS). Simonds was with the GOC on 16 May 1940, six days after the Battle of France began, when McNaughton was summoned to a conference by General Sir Edmund Ironside, the British Chief of the Imperial General Staff (CIGS), about the situation in France, which was not good and seemed to be deteriorating rapidly. The briefing stated the situation as being critical but not completely hopeless, and urged commanders to teach bayonet fighting to instil in their men a fighting spirit. The briefing also urged that German paratroopers were not to be made prisoners of war.

On July 20, 1940, after being promoted to lieutenant colonel, he went on to be commanding officer of the 1st Field Regiment, Royal Canadian Artillery, his first command since leaving C Battery.

In November 1940 he was appointed commandant of the Canadian Junior War Staff Course (an intensive 14-week program that compressed one year of the Camberly course), intended to fill the shortage of trained staff officers. He then became GSO I with the 2nd Canadian Infantry Division under Victor Odlum, a veteran of both the Second Boer War and the First World War in his sixties who was really too old to command in this newer conflict. Despite this, Odlum came to admire the younger man, informing McNaughton of Simonds's, "splendid work" and that he had, "never had an officer on my staff who gave better service."

Shortly thereafter, on August 7, 1941 he was promoted again, now to brigadier, and made acting Brigadier General Staff (BGS) of I Canadian Corps under McNaughton and later George Pearkes. Later he was confirmed as brigadier and stayed in the BGS role under Harry Crerar until mid-July 1942. Crerar, however, had opposed Simonds' appointment and considered his removal. During his time as BGS, numerous exercises, including Bumper in September 1941 and Tiger in May 1942 were conducted, with Simonds catching British Lieutenant-General Bernard Montgomery's eye on both occasions.

In July and August 1942 Simonds was involved in planning for an abortive Churchill-inspired attack on Norway, codenamed "Jupiter", thereby avoiding the Dieppe Raid debacle. Simonds's plan for "Jupiter" required so many ground troops, together with significant air and naval forces in support, that Churchill was forced to abandon the idea. Although the operation was aborted, Simonds received praise for his help in writing the appreciation, with the British Chiefs of Staff Committee informing McNaughton that "This was one of the clearest and most ably worked out appreciations that they had ever had before them."

In September 1942, he was made commander of the 1st Canadian Infantry Brigade, part of the 1st Canadian Infantry Division, now commanded by Major-General H. L. N. Salmon. The brigade was sent to Inverary in Scotland in December 1942, where it took part in training for combined operations.

In January 1943 Simonds became chief of staff of the First Canadian Army, again serving under McNaughton, with Brigadier Howard Graham assuming command of the 1st Brigade. The Army performed poorly in Exercise Spartan (March 1943). Simonds suggested that McNaughton separate his "political" functions (CMHQ) from "fighting" headquarters (First Canadian Army). McNaughton grew angry, and within 48 hours Simonds was on attachment to the British Eighth Army, under Montgomery, then fighting in Tunisia.

=== Sicily 1943 ===
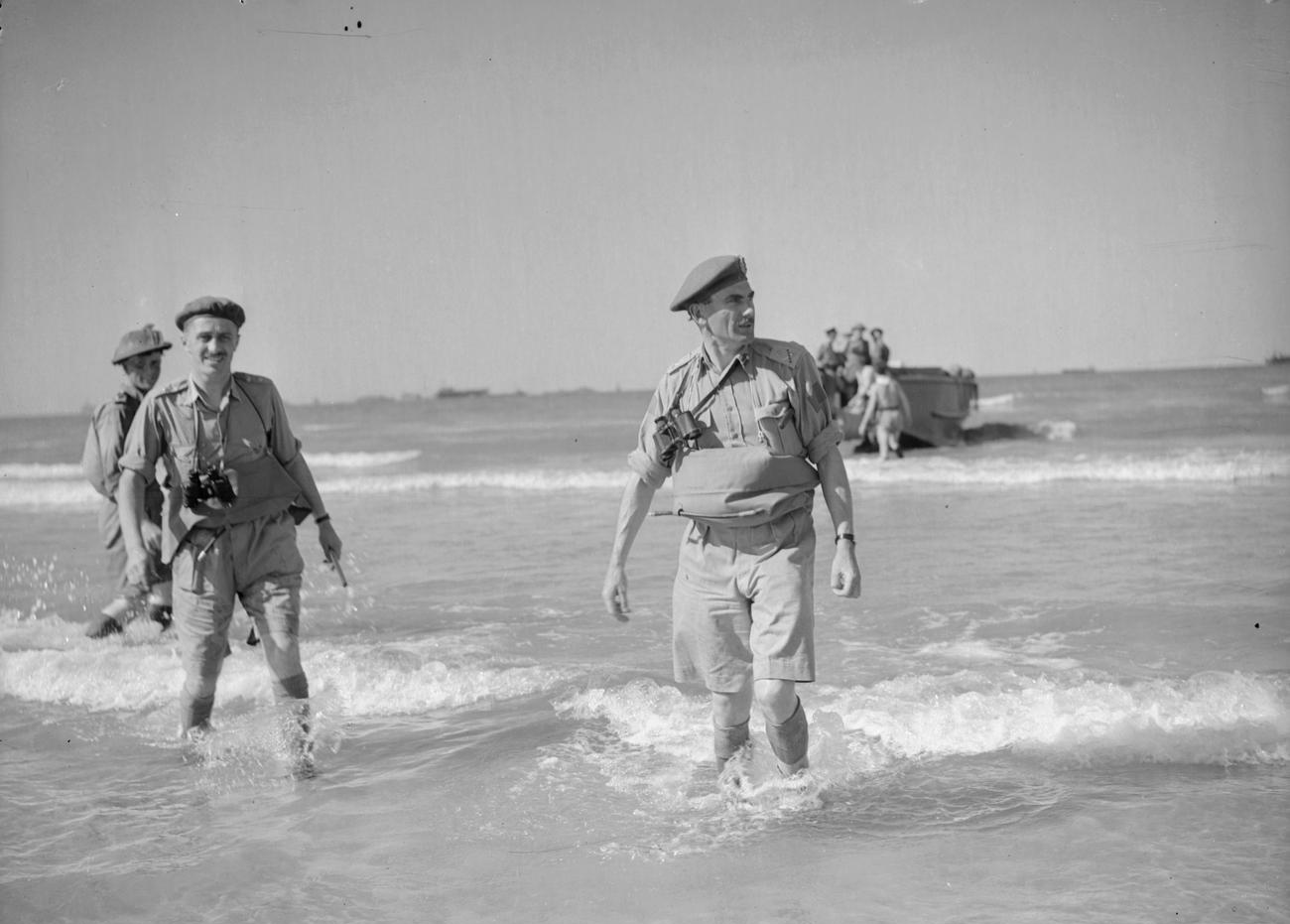
Major-General Simonds, GOC of the 1st Canadian Infantry Division, coming ashore on Sicily, July 1943

On April 20, 1943 (three days before his fortieth birthday) Simonds was promoted to major-general and appointed General Officer Commanding (GOC) of the 2nd Canadian Infantry Division, having risen from major to major-general in three-and-a-half years–faster than any other officer in the Canadian Army. A senior officer had described Simonds to Colonel James Ralston, the Defence Minister, as, "a most outstanding officer but not a leader of the type that will secure the devotion of his followers", although he, "has undoubted ability and will fight his Division and make few mistakes." Simonds's new division had sustained extremely heavy casualties the year before at Dieppe under its previous commander, Major-General John Hamilton Roberts, and was still recovering from its losses.

Just nine days later, however, he was suddenly transferred to the 1st Canadian Infantry Division as its GOC, replacing Major-General Salmon, who had been killed in a plane crash earlier that day over Devon while planning for Operation Husky, codename for the Allied invasion of Sicily. British Rear Admiral Philip Mack, Lieutenant Colonel Chuck Finlay and several other members of Salmon's staff were among the casualties.

In this last post he led the 1st Canadian Division through the invasion of Sicily, which started on July 10, 1943. The division was placed under the command of British XXX Corps, serving alongside the veteran 51st (Highland) Infantry Division, commanded by Lieutenant-General Oliver Leese. XXX Corps was part of the British Eighth Army, under the command of General Sir Bernard Montgomery. Aged just 40, he was the youngest Canadian officer to lead a division in action at that time. He came under fire for the first time on July 16, 1943, after nearly 17 years of service in the Canadian Army.

Always a supporter of Simonds, Montgomery was impressed with the way the younger man had commanded 1st Division throughout the brief but bitter campaign in Sicily, marking him out as a man destined for higher command. Desmond Morton noted that Simonds had proven himself to Montgomery in Sicily as "...an able field commander. No other Canadian would ever quite meet Monty's standards." At Agira and Regalbuto, Simonds won "costly, difficult battles" over the Wehrmacht who used the mountainous terrain of Sicily to their advantage. The victories were not cheap, as the 1st Division had suffered 2,310 casualties in Sicily, losing 562 men killed in action or dying of their wounds, with the rest being wounded or taken prisoner.

=== Italy 1943−1944 ===
The campaign in Sicily was over by mid-August and, after a brief rest, on September 3, 1943, Simonds and the 1st Canadian Division, now serving alongside the British 5th Infantry Division as part of British XIII Corps, commanded by Lieutenant-General Miles Dempsey (whom Simonds was to form a high opinion of), landed on the mainland of Italy in Operation Baytown, part of the Allied invasion of Italy. Meeting light resistance, the division suffered only nine casualties on the first day. Falling ill on September 22, he was replaced as commander of the 1st Canadian Division by Brigadier Christopher Vokes, the former commander of the 2nd Canadian Infantry Brigade.

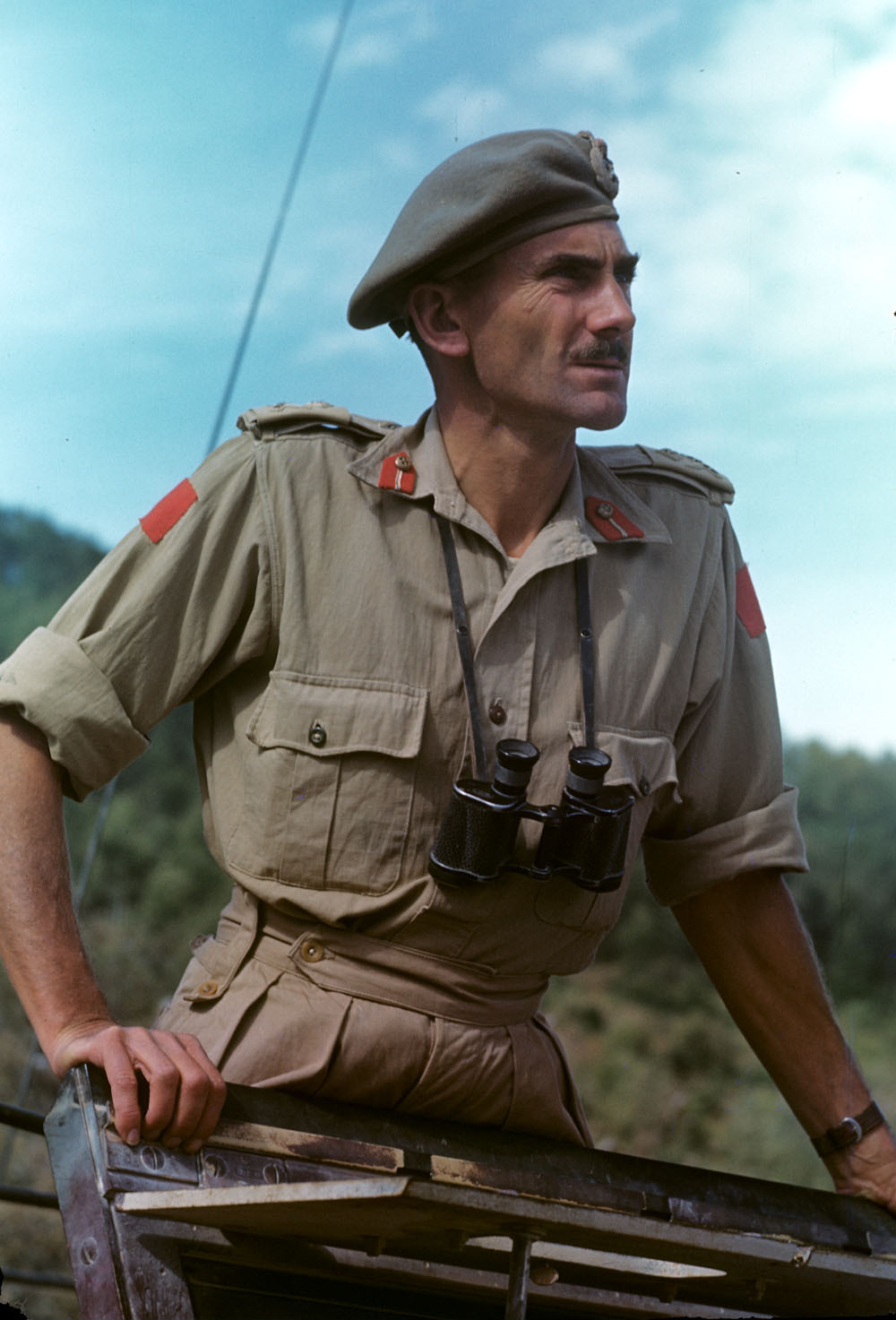
Major-General Simonds, pictured in Italy, 1943

Subsequently, he replaced Major-General Charles Stein as GOC of the recently arrived 5th Canadian (Armoured) Division when it arrived on the Italian Front in November 1943. Simonds viewed this, along with the arrival of Lieutenant-General Harry Crerar and I Canadian Corps, as something of a comedown, although this was not the intent of CMHQ. Montgomery had wanted Simonds to command an armoured division to give him experience with commanding tanks, though the mountainous terrain of Italy was hardly the best place.

Simonds was furious when he learned that, to save shipping, his new division would have to take old equipment from the veteran British 7th Armoured Division (famous in the Western Desert as the "Desert Rats"). Crerar rejected an idea to use 3,350 brand-new I Corps headquarters vehicles to equip the 5th Canadian Armoured Division. The division would not be fully equipped until the end of January 1944.

His initial meeting with Crerar went poorly (possibly strained by Simonds' illness), and relations further deteriorated when Simonds ejected an officer sent by Crerar to measure his headquarters caravan. Crerar was fascinated by Simonds's caravan, and sent an officer to take its measurements without informing Simonds, who expelled the officer when he discovered him in his caravan. Crerar had become jealous of Simonds, who had enjoyed more battlefield success and media attention as the general officer commanding (GOC) of 1st Infantry Division and then as 5th Armour ed Division in Italy than he had.

Crerar attempted to sack Simonds because of this incident, writing to Simonds that he felt his "nerves were over-stretched" and complained about the "personal discourtesy" in expelling the captain from his caravan. Crerar took the matter to General Montgomery, the Eighth Army commander, but found little support. On December 11, 1943 Crerar sent a memo to Montgomery declaring he had "serious cause to doubt...the suitability of Simonds for higher command", going on to write that he believed that Simonds was mentally ill, saying that Simonds had "always been high strung...with a tendency to be introspective rather than objective, when faced with acute problems". Montgomery wrote back that he had the "highest opinion of Simonds" and rejected Crerar's claims that he was mentally ill. However, Crerar discussed the event with army psychiatrists, the temporary commander of the Canadian First Army in England, Lieutenant-General Kenneth Stuart, and post-war pushed for Charles Foulkes to be selected as Chief of the General Staff (CGS) over Simonds.

Simonds's only battle in command of 5th Division was the so-called "Arielli Show", an offensive launched on January 17, 1944 against the German 1st Parachute Division's strong-points southeast of the Arielli River in central Italy. After being defeated by the 1st Canadian Division in the Battle of Ortona in December 1943, the 1st Parachute Division had retreated back to the Riccio River north of Ortona. The Canadians brought down heavy artillery fire first on the left flank of the Germans to allow the Perth Regiment to advance and then on the right flank to allow the Cape Breton Highlanders to advance. As the 1st Parachute Division was well dug in, the heavy Canadian artillery fire did not have the desired results and the assaults by the Perth Regiment and the Cape Breton Highlanders reached about 200 yards of their objectives before being stopped.

=== Northwest Europe 1944−1945 ===
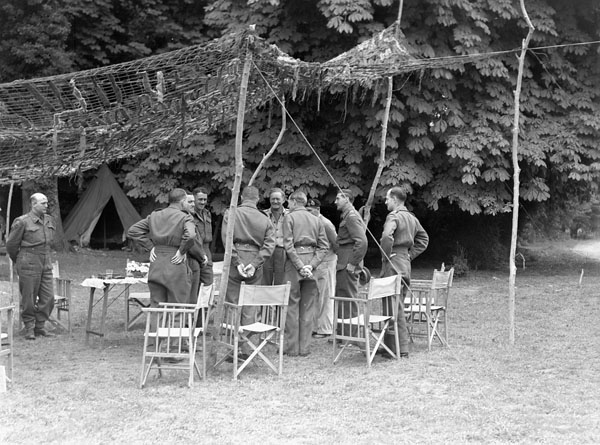
General Montgomery (eighth from left) talking with Lieutenant-General Simonds (ninth from left) and other senior officers of II Canadian Corps at Corps Headquarters in the Normandy bridgehead, France, July 20, 1944

In January 1944 he was recalled to the United Kingdom and, after being promoted to lieutenant-general on January 6, was made General Officer Commanding II Canadian Corps, which went on to take part in the Battle of Normandy and the subsequent advance through France. At the age of just forty, Simonds was purported to be the youngest corps commander in the British Empire. Simonds made numerous personnel changes: The Chief Engineer, Chief Medical Officer and the Commander Corps Royal Artillery (CCRA) were sacked, and F. F. Worthington was replaced as commander of the 4th Canadian (Armoured) Division. Talented officers such as George Kitching, Bruce Matthews and Geoffrey Walsh were brought by Simonds from Italy to II Corps. In his instructions to his officers in February 1944, Simonds noted that the Wehrmacht always fought its defensive battles the same way; namely a thinly manned series of outposts, behind which were a series of strongly held dug-in positions that could bring down interlocking machine gun and mortar fire. Simonds further noted the Wehrmacht would always launch aggressive counter-attacks in face of an Allied attack, stating:

...success of the offensive battle hinges on the defeat of the German counter-attacks, with sufficient of our own reserves in hand to launch a new phase as soon as the enemy strength has spent itself. The defeat of these counter-attacks must form part of the original plan of attack which must include arrangements for artillery support and forward moves of infantry-supporting weapons—including tanks—on the objective.

As Simonds had been trained as a "gunner", as artillerymen were known in the Canadian Army, artillery played a significant role in his planning for offensives with the divisions attacking along narrow points as divisional artillery was only capable of supporting one brigade at a time.

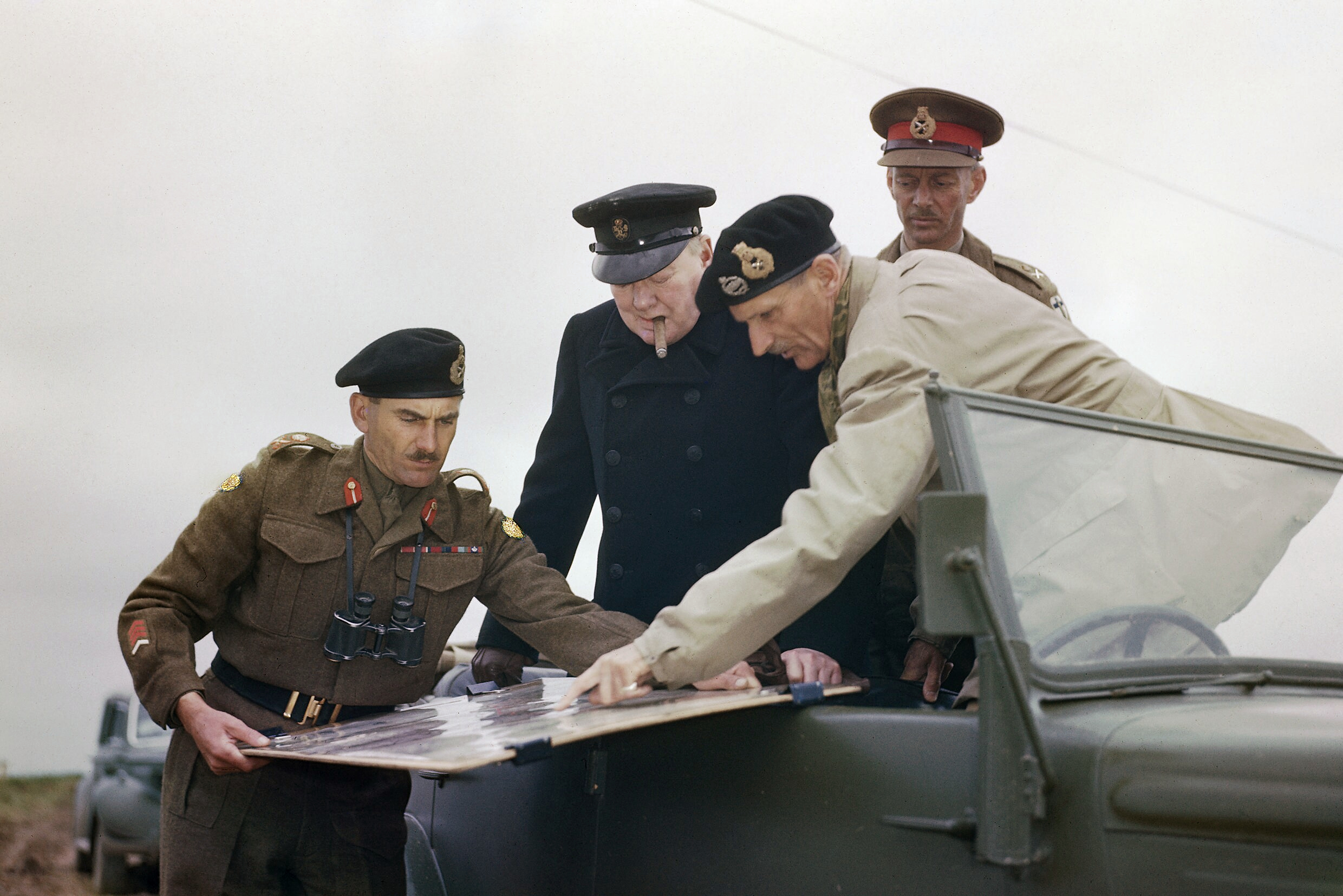
General Sir Bernard Montgomery shows Prime Minister Winston Churchill the battle situation on a map held by the commander of II Canadian Corps, Lieutenant-General Simonds, during Churchill's visit to Normandy, July 22, 1944. Lieutenant-General Miles Dempsey, the commander of the British Second Army, looks on.

Simonds, by his own admission, was bad-tempered, unable to tolerate those he regarded as fools, and had a headstrong streak, which he attempted to check by maintaining a cold "glacial" composure. Simonds always spoke with a strong English accent, and his personality never inspired any affection from the men under his command who regarded him as a "cold Englishman". One Canadian brigadier wrote that Simonds "was not a man one could love. In my heart I knew, however, that I would rather serve under his type than under a kindly, but less driving commander; the former is much more likely to win battles." Simonds had a long-standing feud with his fellow British immigrant Charles Foulkes, going back to their days as students at the Staff College where Simonds had received greater recognition than Foulkes. Both Foulkes and Simonds were ambitious men with strong ruthless streaks, and together with Lieutenant General Harry Crerar, who had "a nasty streak of his own", the three officers were the ones most responsible for the command decisions of the Canadians in the Normandy campaign. Relations between Simonds and Crerar, were very poor as Crerar had attempted to sack Simonds as commander of the 5th Canadian Division in December 1943. However, Simonds was a favorite of Montgomery, who viewed Simonds as the most talented Canadian general in the entire war, and Montgomery blocked Crerar's attempts to send Simonds back to Canada.

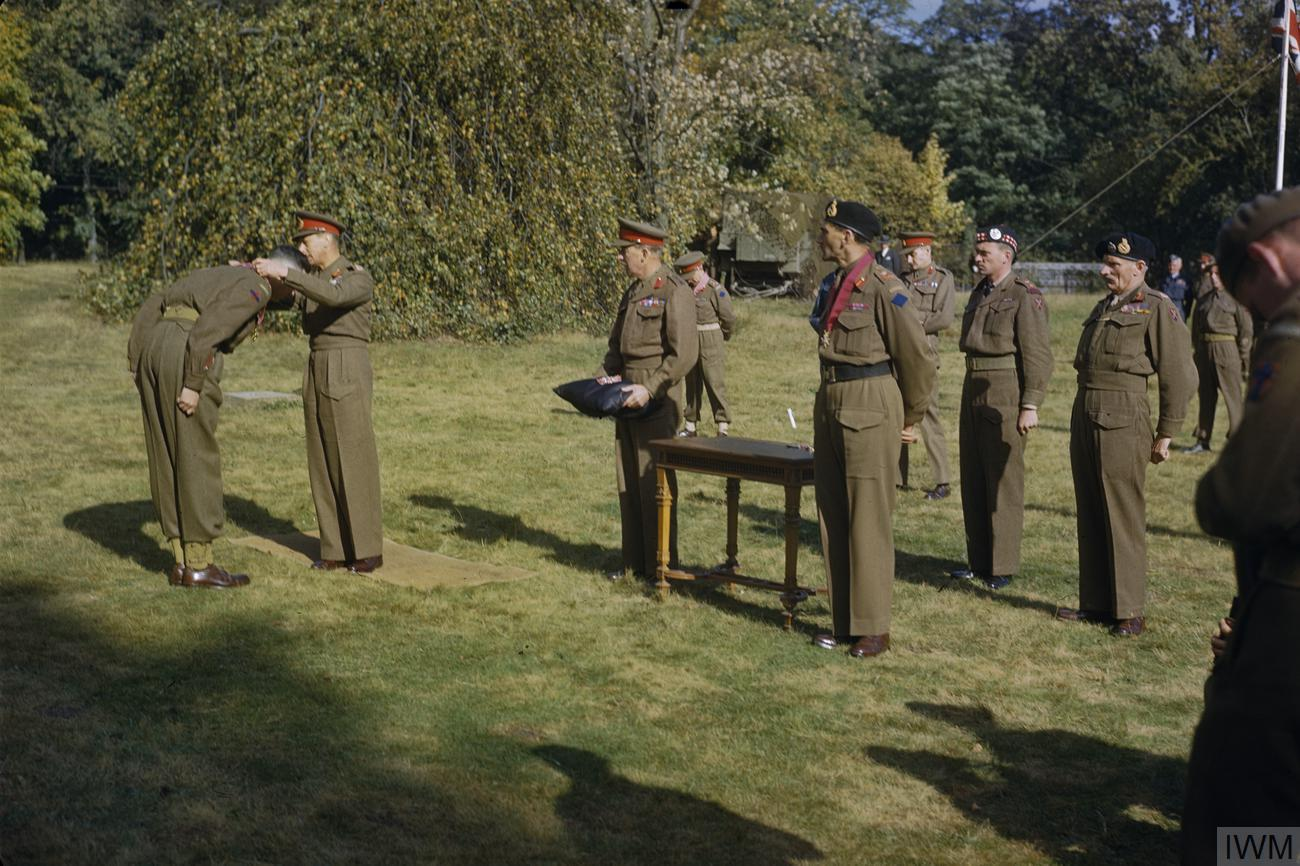
Brigadier J. A. W. Bennett is made a Commander of the British Empire by King George VI at the headquarters of the First Canadian Army in Belgium, October 1944. Lieutenant-General Simonds, wearing a black beret and having just been made a Companion of the Order of the Bath, stands a short distance away, and behind him is Field Marshal Montgomery.

Once II Corps was activated, Simonds would direct four major attacks during the Battle of Normandy in five weeks: Operations Atlantic (the Canadian part of Operation Goodwood), Spring, Totalize and Tractable. After Operation Spring, Simonds tried to sack Foulkes as commander of 2nd Canadian Division, writing that Foulkes "did not [show] the right qualities to command 2nd Division", but was blocked by Crerar, who kept Foulkes on to nettle Simonds. Simonds has often been criticized for his reliance on heavy bombers to "blast" open a way for Operation Totalize, but the Canadian historian Jody Perrun argued that the marked inferiority of the Sherman tanks to the Panther and Tiger tanks of the Germans meant that Simonds had no other choice, but to use air power to even the odds given that both the Panthers and Tigers had more powerful guns and heavier armour than the Shermans. Perrun has charged too many historians have taken at face value the disparaging remarks about Simonds's command by SS-Brigadeführer Kurt "Panzer" Meyer, the commander of the 12th SS Panzer Division Hitlerjugend, who spoke as if the Sherman tanks were the equal of the Tiger and Panther tanks, and charged that the Canadians were insufficiently aggressive in armour ed operations and too reliant upon air support. A principal problem for Simonds was that his tank crews were loath to face the Panthers and Tigers on open ground given their guns could not knock either type of tank except at very close range while the guns of the Panthers and Tigers could knock a Sherman at long range. Perrun argued that Meyer's claims that Simonds lacked aggression failed to take into account the weaknesses of the Sherman tanks, and Simonds designed his operations with the aim of counter-acting the flaws of the Shermans by providing for air and artillery support to even the odds.

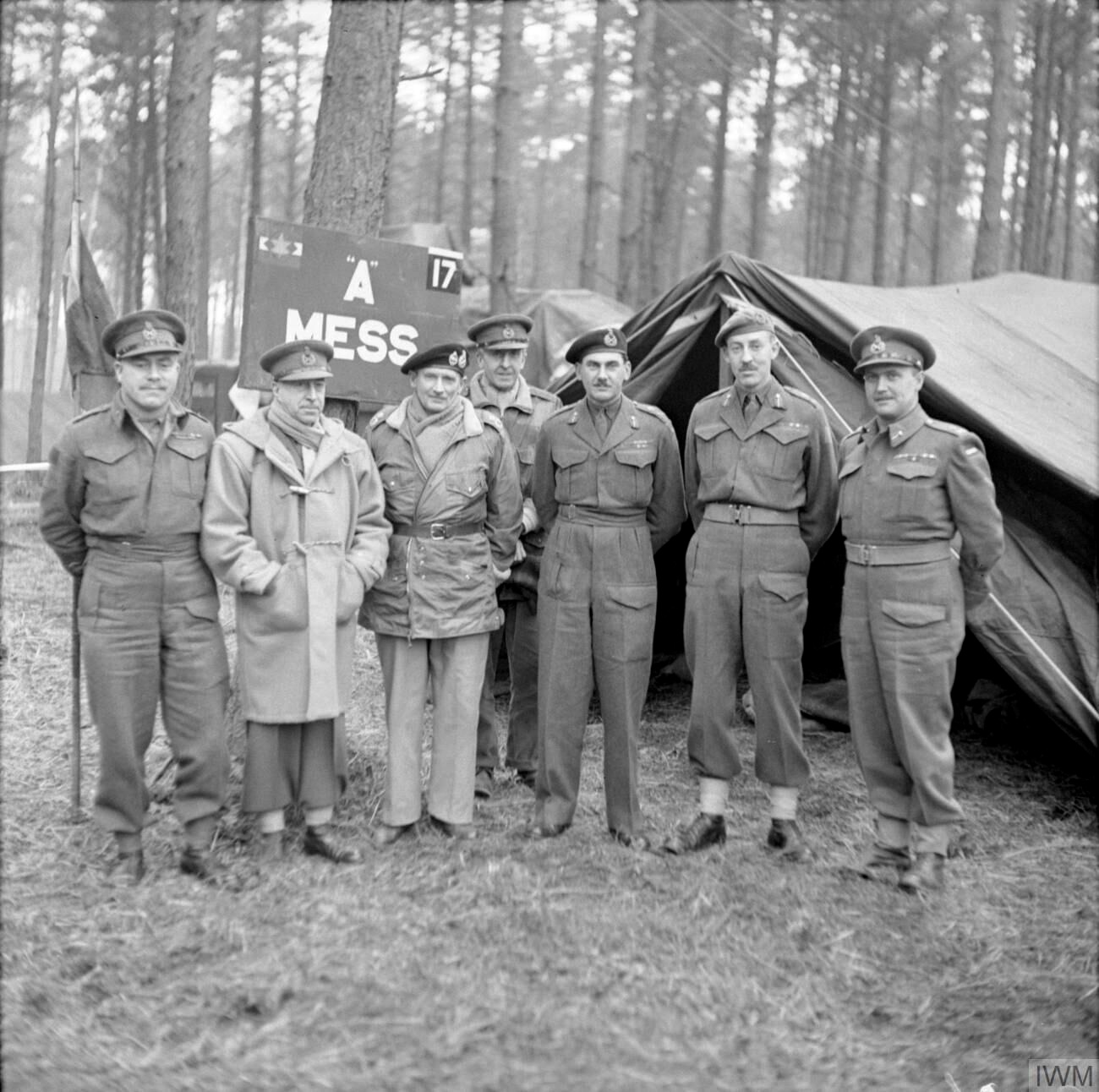
From left to right: Christopher Vokes, Harry Crerar, Sir Bernard Montgomery, Brian Horrocks (both British Army), Guy Simonds, Daniel Spry and Bruce Mathews, all pictured here in February 1945 during Operation Veritable.

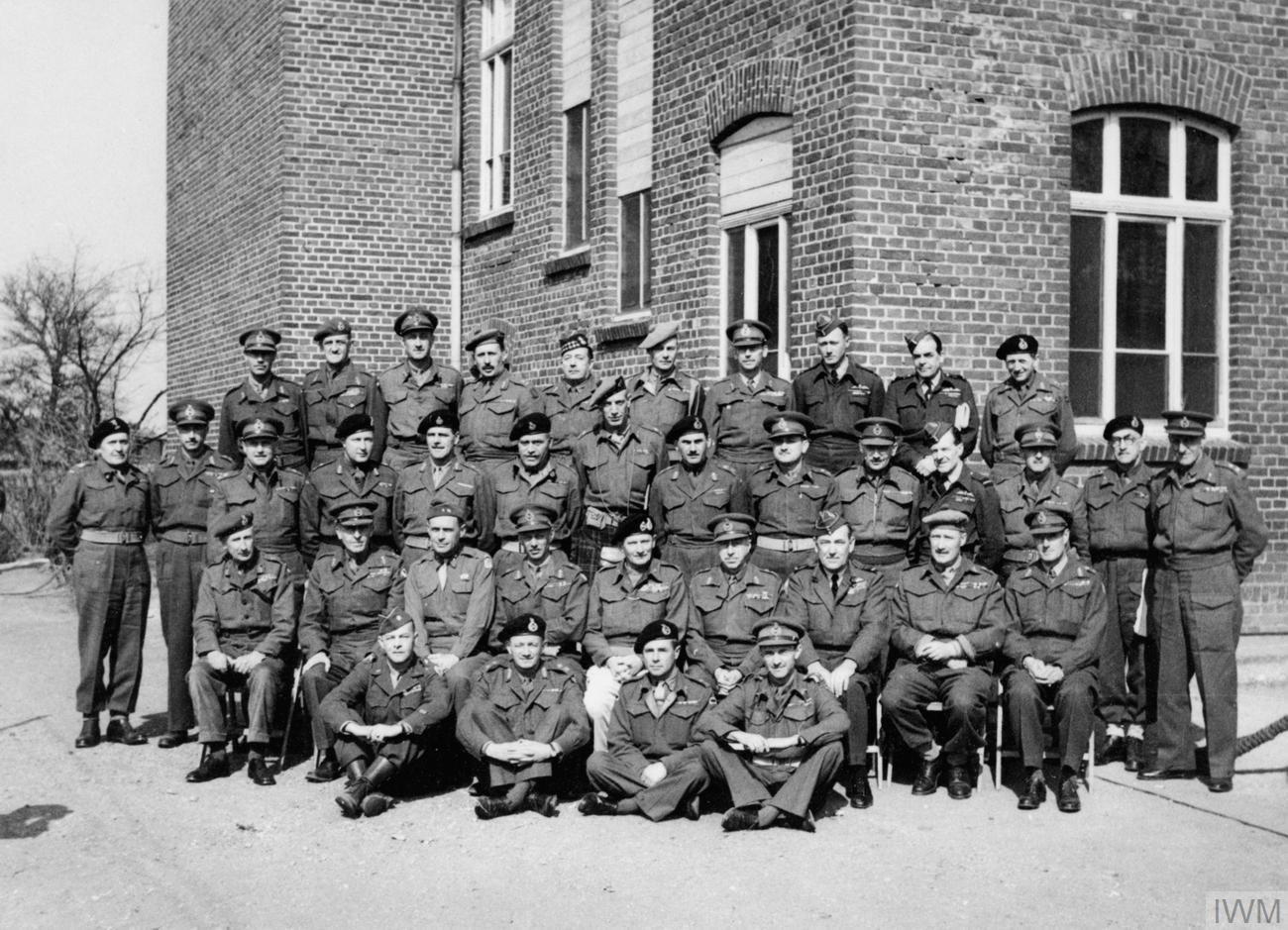
Field Marshal Montgomery with his staff, army, corps and division commanders at Walbeck, Germany, March 22, 1945. Standing in the third row, seventh from the left, is Lieutenant General Simonds.

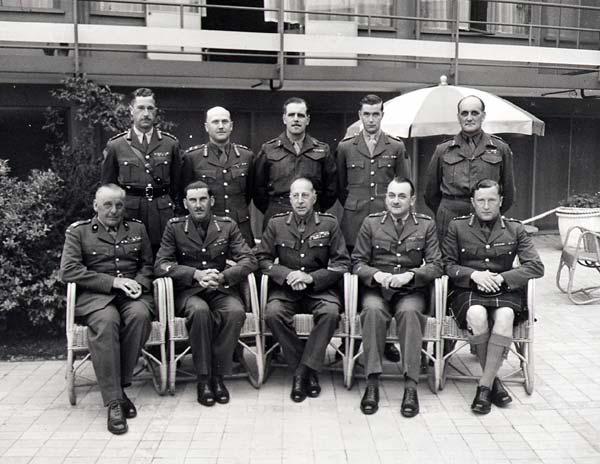
Senior commanders of the First Canadian Army, May 1945. Seated from the left: Stanisław Maczek (Polish Army), Guy Simonds, Harry Crerar, Charles Foulkes, Bert Hoffmeister. Standing from the left: Ralph Keefler, Bruce Matthews, Harry Foster, Robert Moncel (standing in for Chris Vokes), Stuart Rawlins (British Army).

For Totalize (beginning August 7, 1944), which involved a night attack, numerous navigation aids were devised, along with heavy bomber support. Having learned from Operation Spring, Simonds devised the "Kangaroo", an early armoured personnel carrier converted from non-operational armoured vehicles "defrocked Priests". Granatstein characterizes the plan as "brilliant if too complicated", in that it did not account for the inexperience of the troops. The two commanders of the armour ed divisions tasked with leading the assault, George Kitching and Stanisław Maczek both objected to Simonds's plans for a "mailed fist" assault on narrow fronts as allowing the Germans to concentrate their forces for counter-attack, but Simonds argued the planned heavy bombing attack by US bombers would disorganize the Germans enough to allow a breakthrough. As Maczek's English was very poor and Simonds spoke no Polish, the two generals spoke in French, in which Maczek was fluent. Simonds insisted that his French was not that good and so Kitching translated for him. Kitching later accused Simonds of being better at French than what he pretended as the interval for translations gave him more room to develop arguments to dismiss Maczek's concerns.

During Operation Totalize, the US bombers who were supposed to hit the German lines instead carpet-bombed the II Canadian Corps's artillery and assembling areas, badly disorganizing the offensive. While the offensive was derailed by the US "friendly fire", the aggressive Meyer took advantage of the pause to stop the advances of both the 1st Polish Armoured Division at St. Aignan and the 4th Canadian Armoured Division at Langannerie. Simonds's plan for Totalize had called for Canadian heavy and medium artillery to support the Canadian and Polish tanks as they advanced, but the accidental US bombing of the Canadian artillery had robbed the Allied armour of the expected fire support. Simonds, knowing of the weakness of the Sherman tanks, which were both under-armoured and under-gunned, had planned for his artillery to knock out Meyer's Tigers and Panthers, and expected the Germans to counter-attack at once with their armour . The next day, Simonds sent the Worthington Force, comprising a battlegroup of the British Columbia regiment and the Algonquin regiment, which however took a wrong turn, and was annihilated by Meyer who sent his Tiger and Panther tanks against the Shermans.

Tractable, on August 14, used a smoke screen in an attempt to shield armour from German anti-tank weaponry. The Canadian historian Desmond Morton wrote that Operation Tractable should have been a disaster as the Wehrmacht had captured a copy of the Canadian operations plan the night before, but despite this, the assault by the II corps under the cover of smoke ended with the Canadians taking Falaise on 16 August 1944. Afterwards, Simonds had the task of closing the "Falaise Gap" with the 1st Polish Armour ed Division under Major General Stanisław Maczek leading the way and engaging in desperate fighting at the Maczuga (Mace) as the Poles called Hill 262 as the German Army Group B sought to escape from Normandy. Though the 1st Polish Division was nearly destroyed several times as the Germans pushed their way out of Normandy, the Poles at the Maczuga and the Canadians at St. Lambert finally closed the "Falaise Gap" on August 21, 1944. Despite its name, the II Canadian Corps had Polish and British divisions operating under Simonds's command.

In September 1944, Simonds temporarily took charge of the First Canadian Army from Lieutenant-General Harry Crerar, who was recovering from a bout of dysentery, and led the liberation of the mouth of the Scheldt River. "By most accounts, Simonds’ assumption of command reinvigorated the army HQ; where Crerar managed, Simonds commanded." When Crerar resumed command with the First Army, Simonds resumed his command of II Canadian Corps for the liberation of North-Western Europe.

== Post-war Army ==
Simonds was "undoubtedly deeply hurt" when he was passed over for Charles Foulkes as Chief of the General Staff (CGS) in August 1945. In 1946 he went to London where he attended the Imperial Defence College (IDC). He "found that work at the IDC engaged his alert intelligence. He met and talked to leading politicians, industrialists, and servicemen of the Western Alliance." From 1946 to 1949 he was Chief Instructor there, "a signal honour for a Canadian". He returned to Canada in 1949 to take a role as Commandant of the Canadian Army Command and Staff College and the National Defence College. In 1951 he was appointed CGS. In 1950, it was widely believed that the North Korean invasion of South Korea was meant to be a distraction to get US forces bogged down in Korea as the prelude to a Soviet invasion of West Germany. When China entered the Korean War in October 1950, it was believed the world was on the brink of World War III, and on January 16, 1951, the NATO Supreme Allied Commander, General Dwight D. Eisenhower, visited Ottawa to ask Canada for help. The Prime Minister Louis St. Laurent agreed to send two Canadian divisions to West Germany. Simonds wrote at the time that, since the shipping was not available to move two divisions to Europe, the Canadians best be there before World War III started.

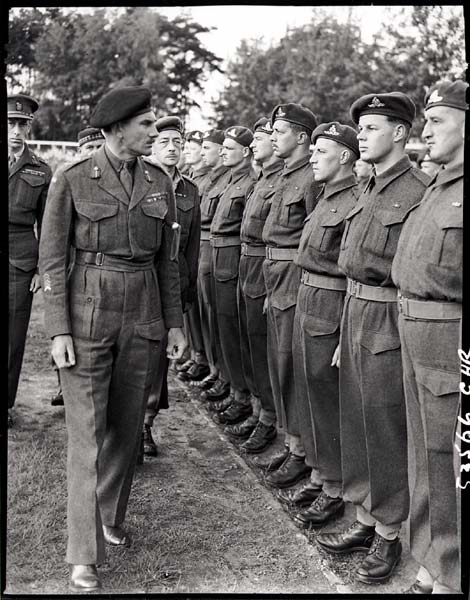
Lieutenant General Simonds inspecting II Canadian Corps in Meppen, May 31, 1945

Simonds clashed with Foulkes, the chairman of the Chiefs of Staff Committee about where to station the Canadians in West Germany. The continentalist Foulkes, who wanted to move Canada closer to the United States, wanted the Canadians to serve with the US Army forces in southern West Germany. Simonds by contrast argued that for historical reasons the Canadians should serve with the British forces in northern West Germany, arguing that the Canadians would fight better with them if the Red Army should invade West Germany. Simonds stated that the Canadians had fought alongside the British successively in the Boer War, the First World War, the Second World War, and the Korean War, and moreover the Canadian Army was closely modelled after the British Army right down to having British-style uniforms and ranks and the same regimental structure; for all these reasons, Simonds felt that placing the Canadians with the British in northern West Germany would be a better fit. As the Canadian decision-makers had been "shocked by the US performance in Korea" while the British forces fighting in Korea had fought well, Simonds won the debate and it was agreed that the Canadians would serve as part of the British Army of the Rhine (BAOR), though Foulkes was able to ensure the Royal Canadian Air Force (RCAF) units would serve with the US Air Force (USAF) instead of the British Royal Air Force (RAF).

At the same time, Simonds had to oversee the build-up of the Canadian military for the new commitments in West Germany and for the Korean War; the defence budget had risen to $1,907 million by 1953, ten times what it had been in 1947. From 1950 to 1953, the military went from having 47,000 service personnel to 104,000. Simonds spoke of bringing in conscription to meet NATO commitments, but was silenced by the defence minister, Brooke Claxton, who warned him with the polls showing 83% of the Quebecois opposed to conscription that the subject was too politically toxic for the government to contemplate. In 1952, the Collège militaire royal de Saint-Jean was opened to provide training in French for French-Canadian officer candidates; previously all officer candidates were trained in English at the Royal Military College in Kingston. Besides the Royal 22^{e} Régiment and the 8th Canadian Hussars, the Canadian Army in the 1950s made little acknowledgement of the "French fact", but the Army was more open to French-Canadians than either the Royal Canadian Air Force or the Royal Canadian Navy, where the language of command was English.

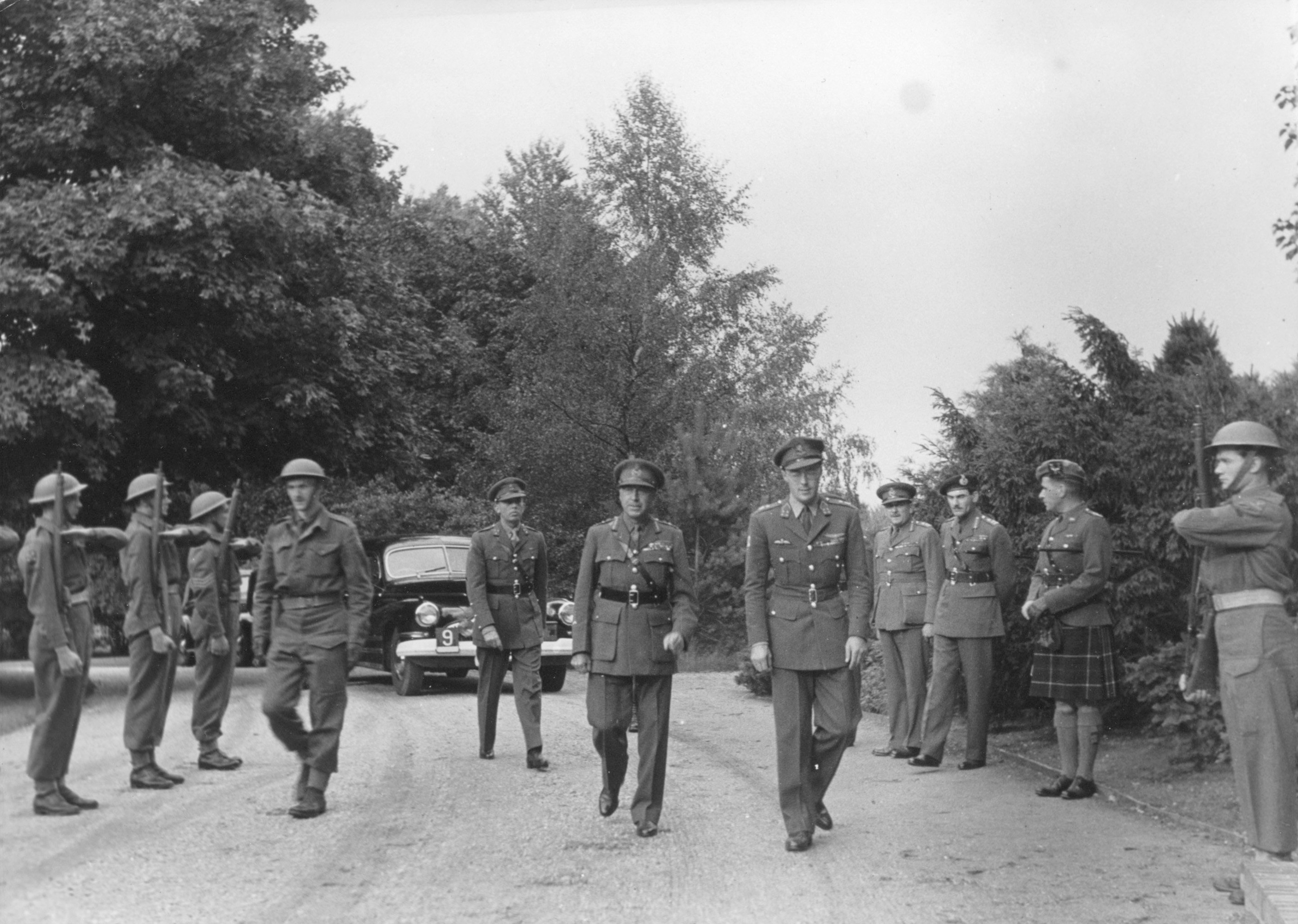
The commander of the First Canadian Army in the Netherlands, General Harry Crerar, arrives at Prince Bernhard's headquarters in Apeldoorn to receive the Grand Cross of the Order of Orange-Nassau with Swords, July 20, 1945. Lieutenant-General Simonds can be seen in the background, with beret, along with Lieutenant-General Charles Foulkes, wearing peaked cap.

Simonds believed that esprit de corps was the key to maintaining morale, and felt that regimental pride in the history and traditions was what motivated soldiers to fight. For this reason, as part of the army's expansion, Simonds had militia regiments like the Black Watch of Montreal, the Fort Garry Horse of Winnipeg, and the Queen's Own Rifles of Toronto taken on as regular regiments instead of creating new ones, arguing the histories and traditions of these regiments would provide greater regimental pride for the men serving in them than a new regiment would. Simonds also created a Regiment of Canadian Guards which closely resembled the Brigade of Guards in London, right down to having scarlet uniforms and bearskin hats. Morton wrote that a "more practical aid to morale, opposed by Simonds, was a decision to allow families to join Canadian service personnel in Europe".

== Retirement and later years ==
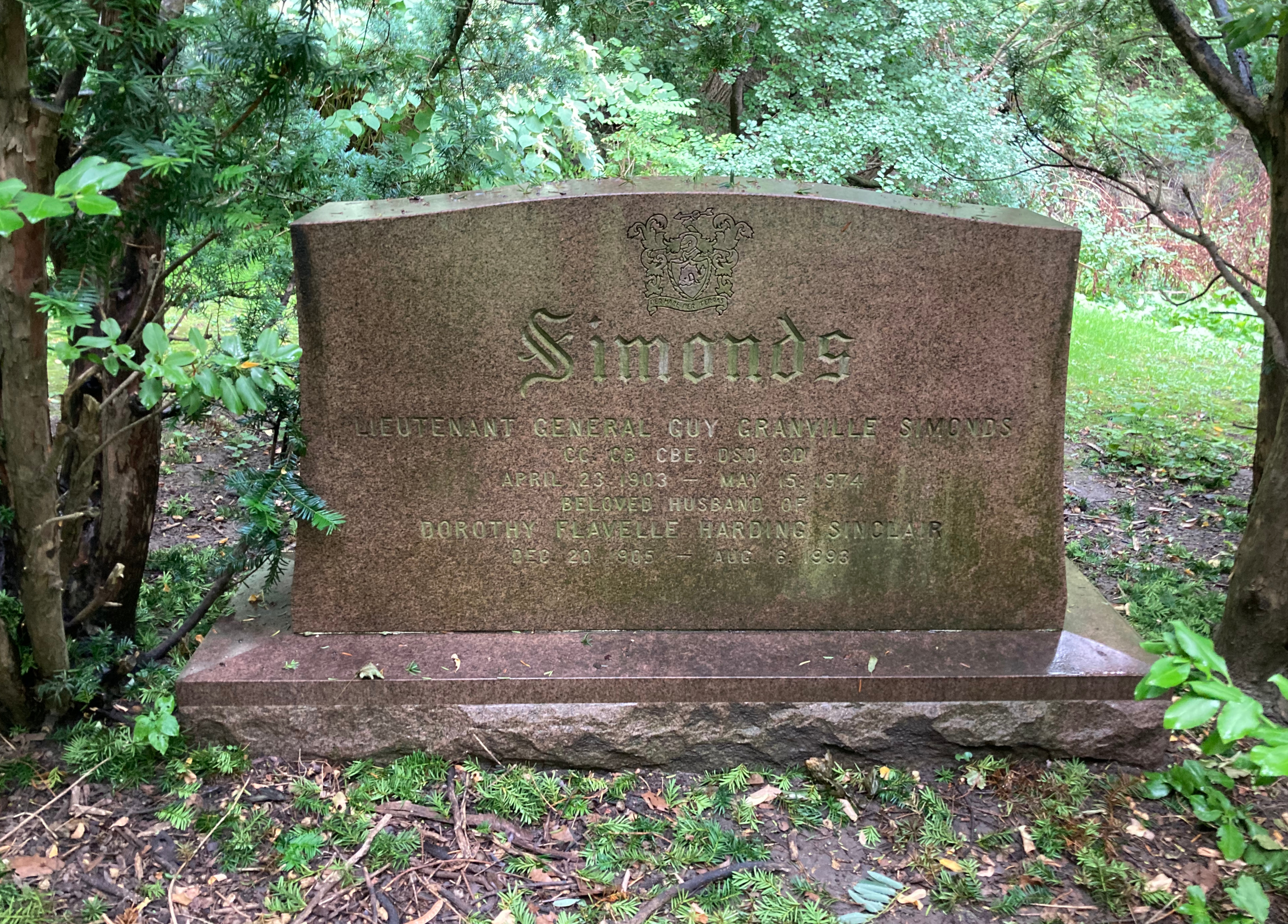
Simonds' grave at Mount Pleasant Cemetery

After retiring from the Canadian Army, he worked for Halifax Insurance Company, and Toronto Brick and Associates. He was active with Royal Life Saving Society, the Gurkha Appeal, the Corps of Commissionaires and was chairman of the National Ballet.

He criticized the government for seeking closer ties with the United States, and opposed the reliance on nuclear weapons, advocating strong conventional forces. Simonds proposed the use of aerial supply to reduce the vulnerability of army divisional supply chains. Skeptical of air-power advocates, he foresaw the increasing use of missiles. He believed in the "integration" of defence headquarters, but opposed the Hellyer "unification" of the armed forces. Simonds wrote at the time that each service required a distinctive leadership style for officers; stating that for a pilot alone in his jet decided by himself to fight or flee when faced with an enemy; for a naval officer holding the equivalent rank as the pilot, the decision to fight or flee was made by the captain of his ship; and for an army officer holding the equivalent ranks as the air force and naval officers had to decide for himself to fight or flee and motivate the men under his command to do the same. Simonds concluded that the plans of the Defence Minister Paul Hellyer to unify the services would never work as it was based on the assumption there was really no difference between war on land, at sea and in the air and a common service could handle all three. At the same time, Simonds also opposed Hellyer's plans to "Canadianize" the military by scrapping the traditional British style uniforms and ranks of all three services and impose an US style uniform and ranks on the unified Canadian Forces, warning this attack on the traditions on the Canadian military would hurt morale.

Diagnosed with lung cancer, he died in Toronto on May 15, 1974. He was buried in Toronto's Mount Pleasant Cemetery after a service at Grace Church-on-the-Hill.

== Married life ==
On August 17, 1932, he married Katherine "K" Lockhart Taylor, the daughter of a Winnipeg businessman. K was a spirited young woman, having taken flying lessons, a motor mechanics course, and eventually teaching Guy how to drive. As a subaltern, Simonds had to ask special permission to marry. They had a daughter, Ruth, born in England in June 1933, and a son, Charles, born in Kingston in 1934.

While overseas in World War II, Simonds had an affair, which K subsequently discovered while in England in 1946. They separated shortly thereafter.

Shortly before retirement, Simonds met Dorothy "Do" Sinclair (the widow of George Graham "Gus" Sinclair) whom he married on January 16, 1960.

== Legacy ==
Royal appreciation in the Netherlands, December 1945

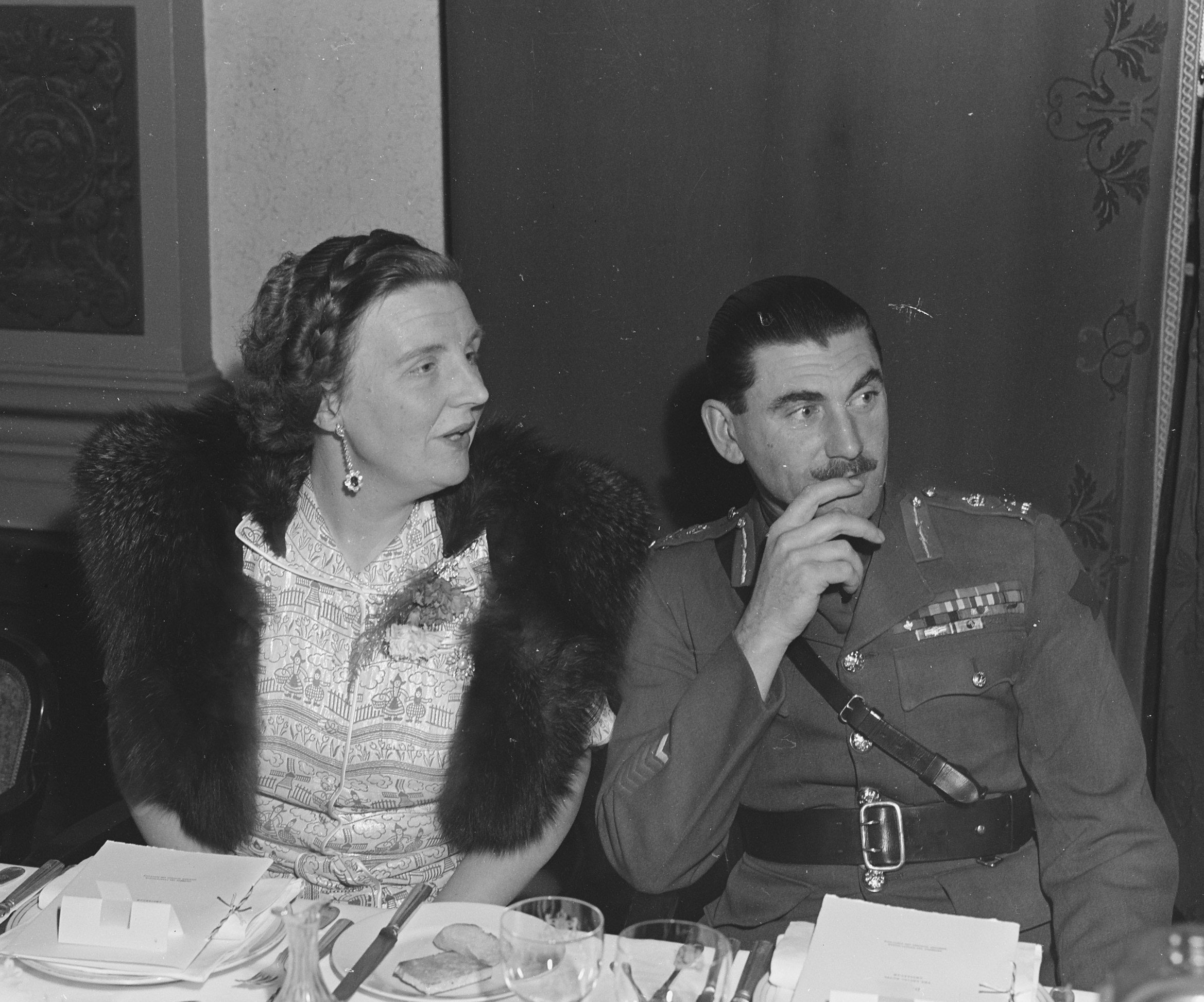
Princes Juliana and Simonds at his farewell dinner, Het Loo Palace

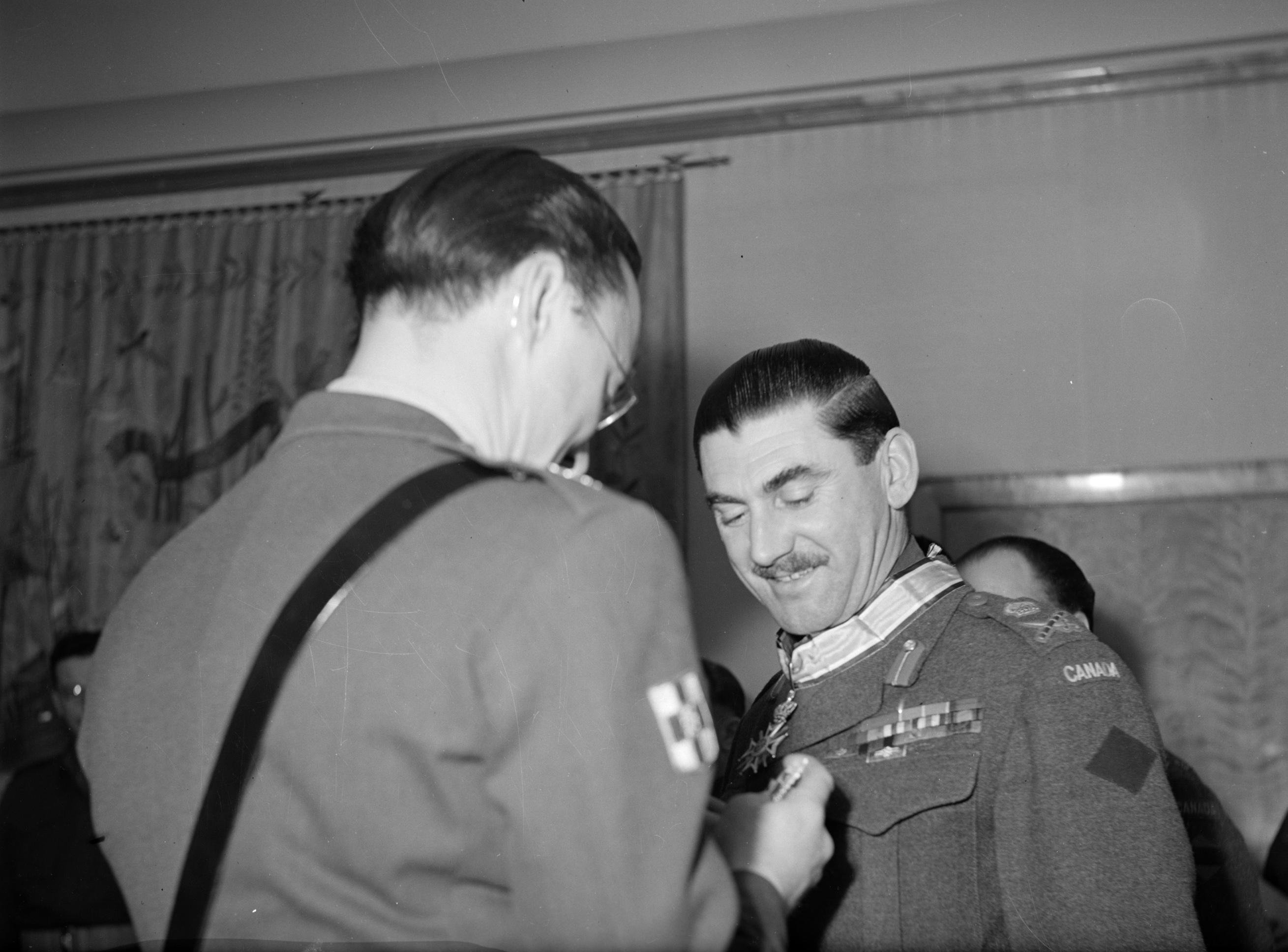
Prince Bernard decorating Simonds, Soestdijk Palace

Two streets are named after Simonds; in Antwerp ("Generaal Simondslaan") and in Genemuiden ("Majoor Generaal Simondsstraat").

=== Honours ===
Simonds was decorated as Grand Officer of the Order of Orange-Nassau with swords in December 1945 by the Royal family of the Netherlands for his efforts in the liberation of the country.

Simonds was honorary colonel of the Royal Regiment of Canada at the time of the regiment's 100th anniversary in October 1962. He was offered an honorary degree from RMC which he declined, as he had opposed the degree program, fearing the long tenure of civilian instructors would unduly influence the curriculum. On October 29, 1971, he was made a Companion of the Order of Canada.

=== Assessment ===
Randall Wakelam says, "Canadian biographies and memoirs carry two themes: innovative and hard driving commander; cold and uninspiring leader." Terry Copp suggests, "overwhelming self-confidence and a degree of arrogance which did not encourage expressions of dissent. Simonds did not attempt to lead; he sought only to command." US Army General Omar Bradley called Simonds the "best of the Canadian generals", while the British Lieutenant-General Sir Brian Horrocks described Simonds as "a first class commander with a most original brain and full of initiative." Simonds's friend and superior for much of the last two years of the war, General Sir Miles Dempsey, believed Simonds in Normandy to be "the best of my Corps Commanders."

In his book, The Normandy Campaign, Victor Brooks lists Simonds as the most effective corps-level commander of the Allied Forces in Normandy. He wrote:

The corps commander among the units that comprised the 21st Army Group who most likely had the largest personal impact on the Normandy campaign was Lieutenant General Guy Simonds. This senior officer of the II Canadian Corps created one of the most effective tank-infantry teams in the Allied forces through a high degree of improvisation during the drive from Caen to Falaise. This general was versatile and imaginative but was not able to generate the momentum that would have more fully closed off the Falaise gap at an earlier date. Despite this drawback, Simonds deserves credit for his effective command.

Sir Max Hastings states: "one of the outstanding Allied corps commanders in Europe, a dour, direct officer who brought unusual imagination to bear on every operational plan for which he was responsible."

== Bibliography ==
- Brooks, Victor (2002). The Normandy Campaign: from D-Day to the liberation of Paris. Cambridge, Massachusetts: Da Capo Press. ISBN 978-0-306-81149-4.
- Copp, Terry (2007). Guy Simonds and the Art of Command (PDF). Canadian Defence Academy Press. ISBN 978-0662445883.
- Dancocks, Daniel G. (1991). The D-Day Dodgers. Toronto: McClelland & Stewart Inc. ISBN 978-0-7710-2544-0.
- Delaney, Douglas E. (2011). Corps Commanders: Five British and Canadian Generals at War, 1939–45. Vancouver: UBC Press. ISBN 9780774820905.
- English, John A. (1991). Failure in High Command The Canadians and the Normandy Campaign. Ottawa: Golden Dog. ISBN 9780919614604.
- Graham, Dominick (1994). The Price of Command: A Biography of General Guy Simonds. Toronto: Stoddart Publishing. ISBN 978-0-7737-2692-5.
- Granatstein, Jack (1993). The Generals: The Canadian Army's Senior Commanders in the Second World War. Stoddart Publishing. ISBN 978-0-7737-2730-4.
- Granatstein, Jack (2005). The Generals: The Canadian Army's Senior Commanders in the Second World War. University of Calgary Press. ISBN 978-1-55238-176-2.
- Morton, Desmond (1999). A Military History of Canada: From Champlain to Kosovo. McClelland and Stewart.
- Neillands, Robin (2005). "Chapter 7: The Battle for the Scheldt". The Battle for the Rhine. Weidenfeld & Nicolson. ISBN 978-0-297-84617-8.
- Perrun, Jody (January 2003). "Best-Laid Plans: Guy Simonds and Operation Totalize, 7-10 August 1944". The Journal of Military History. 67 (1): 137–173. doi:10.1353/jmh.2003.0064. S2CID 159737875.
- Zuehlke, Mark (2008). Operation Husky. Vancouver: Douglas & McIntyre. ISBN 978-1-55365-539-8.

Military offices
Preceded by John Roberts	GOC 2nd Canadian Infantry Division; April 1943	Succeeded by Eedson Burns
Preceded by Harry Salmon	GOC 1st Canadian Infantry Division; April 1943–October 1943	Succeeded by Christopher Vokes
Preceded by Charles Stein	GOC 5th Canadian Armoured Division; 1943–1944	Succeeded by Eedson Burns
Preceded by Ernest Sansom	GOC II Canadian Corps; 1944–1945	Succeeded by Post disbanded
Preceded by Sir John Whiteley	Commandant of the National Defence College, Canada; 1949−1951	Succeeded by ??
Preceded by Sir John Whiteley	Commandant of the Canadian Army Command and Staff College; 1949–1951	Succeeded by George Kitching
Preceded by Charles Foulkes	Chief of the General Staff; 1951–1955	Succeeded by Howard Graham
