= Howard Graham (Canadian Army officer) =

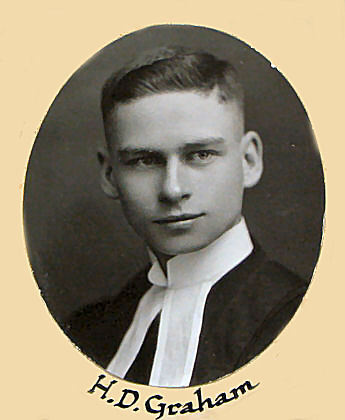
- Osgoode Hall Law School photo, 1921
- Born: 15 July 1898; Buffalo, New York, U.S.
- Died: 28 September 1986 (aged 88); Oakville, Ontario, Canada
- Military career
- Allegiance: British Empire
- Branch: Canadian Army
- Service years: 1916–1958
- Rank: Lieutenant General
- Commands: The Hastings and Prince Edward Regiment; 1st Infantry Brigade; Chief of the General Staff
- Conflicts: World War I World War II
- Awards: Order of Canada; Commander of the Royal Victorian Order; Commander of the Order of the British Empire; Distinguished Service Order and Bar; Canadian Efficiency Decoration; Canadian Forces' Decoration

Lieutenant General Howard Douglas Graham OC, CVO, CBE, DSO, ED, CD, QC (15 July 1898 – 28 September 1986) was a Canadian Army Officer and Chief of the General Staff.

== Early life ==
Born in Buffalo, New York, he was raised on a farm in Trenton, Ontario. He was called to the Ontario Bar Association in 1922 and practised law for 17 years in Trenton. During World War I, he enlisted with the Canadian Militia at age 17 and served with the Canadian Infantry in France, Germany and Belgium. Between the wars, Graham continued in the militia as an officer with The Hastings and Prince Edward Regiment.

== World War II and beyond ==
With the outbreak of World War II in 1939, Graham went overseas with The Hastings and Prince Edward Regiment as the regimental second-in-command. Later serving as the regimental commanding officer from 1940-1941 and later promoted to Brigadier in command of the 1st Canadian Infantry Brigade, he served in Britain, France, Sicily and Italy.

From 1946 to 1948 he was the Senior Canadian Army Liaison Officer and Army Advisor to the Canadian High Commissioner in London. From 1948 to 1950 he was Vice Chief of General Staff of the Canadian Army. From 1951 to 1955 he was the General Officer Commanding Central Command in Canada. From 1955 to 1958 he was the Chief of the General Staff of the Canadian Army. After retiring in 1958, he was Canadian Secretary to the Queen for the Royal Tour of Canada in 1959 and 1967. From 1961 to 1966, he was president of the Toronto Stock Exchange.

In 1987, his autobiography, Citizen and Soldier: The Memoirs of Lieutenant-General Howard Graham, was published.

== Honours ==
- Commander of the Order of the British Empire
- Distinguished Service Order (twice)
- Officer of the Legion of Honour
- Croix de Guerre
- Officer of the Legion of Merit of the United States
- In 1967, he was made an Officer of the Order of Canada.

Military offices
| Preceded by Guy Granville Simonds | Chief of the General Staff; September 2, 1955–1958 | Succeeded by Samuel Findlay Clark |
