= Battle of Vimy Ridge order of battle =

WW1 battle

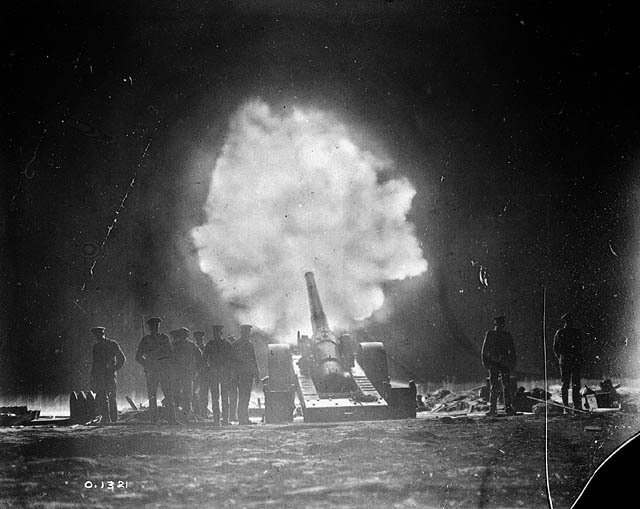
6-inch gun of the Royal Garrison Artillery firing over Vimy Ridge behind Canadian lines at night

The Battle of Vimy Ridge was a military engagement fought as part of the Battle of Arras, in the Nord-Pas-de-Calais region of France, during the First World War. The main combatants were the Canadian Corps against three divisions of the German Sixth Army. The battle was part of the opening phase of the Battle of Arras, part Nivelle Offensive and took place from 9–12 April 1917. The objective of the Canadian Corps was to take control of the German-held high ground, along an escarpment at the northernmost end of the Arras Offensive. This would ensure that the southern flank could advance without suffering German enfilade fire.

This listing covers Allied Powers and Central Powers formations and units involved in the battle. Although the Canadian side is well studied, historians have had trouble determining the exact dispositions of the German forces and even more trouble assessing the casualties it suffered in the battle. The Canadian Corps suffered 10,602 casualties; 3,598 killed and 7,004 wounded. The German Sixth Army suffered an unknown number of casualties with an approximate 4,000 men becoming prisoners of war.

The significance of the Battle of Vimy Ridge is most strongly felt in Canada. Elsewhere the battle is principally noted as part of the much larger British offensive known as the Battles of Arras 1917. The historical reality of the battle has been reworked and reinterpreted, in a conscious attempt to give purpose and meaning to an event which came to symbolize Canada's coming of age as a nation. The idea that Canada achieved nationhood as a direct result of the experiences of the First World War, is an opinion widely held in military histories of Canada and also regularly appears in general histories. A 250-acre (100 ha) portion of the former battleground is preserved memorial park and site of the Canadian National Vimy Memorial.

== Allied Powers forces ==
Canadian Corps commander Lieutenant-General Sir Julian Byng had four attacking divisions, one division of reserves and numerous support units under his command. He was supported to the north by the 24th Division of I Corps which advanced north of the Souchez river and by the advancing XVII Corps to the south. The 4th Canadian Division was responsible for the northern portion of the advance which included the capture of the highest point of the ridge followed by the heavily defended knoll known as "the Pimple" just north of the town of Givenchy-en-Gohelle. The 3rd Canadian Division was responsible for the narrow central section of the ridge, including the capture of La Folie Farm. The 2nd Canadian Division, which later included an additional brigade from the 5th Division was directly south of 3rd Canadian Division and entrusted with the capture of the town of Thélus. The 1st Canadian Division was responsible for the broad southern sector of the corps advance and was expected to make the greatest advance in terms distance. Byng also planned for a healthy reserve for contingencies in case additional troops were needed to relieve forward troops, help in consolidating positions or aiding the 4th Canadian Division with the capture of "the Pimple". As a result, the 9th Canadian Brigade, 15th Brigade and 95th Brigade were kept in corps reserve.

=== Canadian Corps ===
Canadian Corps (Lieutenant-General Sir Julian Byng)
Corps level troops
Commander	Formation	Unit	Notes
Lieutenant-Colonel E. I. Leonard (Cavalry)		Canadian Light Horse	
Brigadier-General Edward Morrison (General Officer Commanding Royal Artillery, Canadian Corps); Brigadier-General Roger Henry Massie (General Officer Commanding Corps Heavy Artillery)	1st Canadian Heavy Artillery Group, Canadian Garrison Artillery	3rd Canadian Siege Battery; 5th Canadian Siege Battery; 11th Siege Battery RGA; 163rd Siege Battery RGA; 164th Siege Battery RGA	Support 4th Canadian Division
Brigadier-General Edward Morrison (General Officer Commanding Royal Artillery, Canadian Corps); Brigadier-General Roger Henry Massie (General Officer Commanding Corps Heavy Artillery)	2nd Canadian Heavy Artillery Group, Canadian Garrison Artillery	1st Canadian Heavy Battery; 2nd Canadian Heavy Battery; 152nd Heavy Battery RGA; 2nd Canadian Siege Battery; 12th Siege Battery RGA	Counter-Battery Group #3
Brigadier-General Edward Morrison (General Officer Commanding Royal Artillery, Canadian Corps); Brigadier-General Roger Henry Massie (General Officer Commanding Corps Heavy Artillery)	18th Heavy Artillery Group	1st Canadian Siege Battery; 6th Canadian Siege Battery; 147th Siege Battery RGA; 180th Siege Battery RGA; 182nd Siege Battery RGA	Support 1st Canadian Division
Brigadier-General Edward Morrison (General Officer Commanding Royal Artillery, Canadian Corps); Brigadier-General Roger Henry Massie (General Officer Commanding Corps Heavy Artillery)	30th Heavy Artillery Group	4th Canadian Siege Battery; 6th Canadian Siege Battery; 228th Siege Battery RGA; 270th Siege Battery RGA; 72nd Siege Battery RGA; 181st Siege Battery RGA	Support 4th Canadian Division
Brigadier-General Edward Morrison (General Officer Commanding Royal Artillery, Canadian Corps); Brigadier-General Roger Henry Massie (General Officer Commanding Corps Heavy Artillery)	44th Heavy Artillery Group	7th Canadian Siege Battery; 161st Siege Battery RGA; 120th Siege Battery RGA; 41st Siege Battery RGA; 114th Siege Battery RGA	Support 1st Canadian Division
Brigadier-General Edward Morrison (General Officer Commanding Royal Artillery, Canadian Corps); Brigadier-General Roger Henry Massie (General Officer Commanding Corps Heavy Artillery)		9th Canadian Siege Battery; E (Canadian) Anti-Aircraft Battery	
Brigadier-General William Lindsay (Chief Engineer, Canadian Corps)		Corps Survey Section; 1st Tramway Company; 2nd Tramway Company; 1st Canadian Army Troops Company; 2nd Canadian Army Troops Company; 3rd Canadian Army Troops Company; 4th Canadian Army Troops Company; 1st Entrenching Battalion; 2nd Entrenching Battalion; 3rd Entrenching Battalion; 4th Entrenching Battalion; Canadian Corps Cyclist Battalion; Anti-Aircraft Searchlight Company	
Colonel Raymond Brutinel (Machine guns)	1st Canadian Motor Machine-Gun Brigade	Eaton Battery; Borden Battery; Yukon Battery	
British First Army troops attached to Canadian Corps
Major General H. F. Mercer (Heavy Artillery)	13th Heavy Artillery Group	47th Siege Battery RGA; 49th Siege Battery RGA; 101st Siege Battery RGA; 76th Siege Battery RGA; 27th Siege Battery RGA	Support 3rd Canadian Division
Major General H. F. Mercer (Heavy Artillery)	50th Heavy Artillery Group	1/1st Essex Heavy Battery RGA; 145th Heavy Battery RGA; 58th Siege Battery RGA; 68th Siege Battery RGA; 69th Siege Battery RGA; 95th Siege Battery RGA	Counter-Battery Group #1
Major General H. F. Mercer (Heavy Artillery)	53rd Heavy Artillery Group	206th Siege Battery RGA; 108th Siege Battery RGA; 148th Siege Battery RGA; 276th Siege Battery RGA	Support 3rd Canadian Division
Major General H. F. Mercer (Heavy Artillery)	64th Heavy Artillery Group	121st Siege Battery RGA; 126th Siege Battery RGA; 258th Siege Battery RGA; 232nd Siege Battery RGA; 73rd Siege Battery RGA	Support 2nd Canadian Division
Major General H. F. Mercer (Heavy Artillery)	70th Heavy Artillery Group	3rd Siege Battery RGA; 14th Siege Battery RGA; 162nd Siege Battery RGA; 144th Siege Battery RGA	Support 2nd Canadian Division
Major General H. F. Mercer (Heavy Artillery)	76th Heavy Artillery Group	218th Siege Battery RGA; 31st Heavy Battery RGA; 128th Heavy Battery RGA; 129th Heavy Battery RGA; 142nd Heavy Battery RGA; 50th Heavy Battery RGA	Counter-Battery Group 3
Major General H. F. Mercer (Heavy Artillery)	26th Heavy Artillery Group	1st Howitzer, Royal Marine Artillery; 11th Howitzer, Royal Marine Artillery; 12th Howitzer, Royal Marine Artillery; 44th Siege Battery RGA; 52nd Siege Battery RGA; 89th Siege Battery RGA	
Royal Engineers		No. 1 Pontoon Park, Royal Engineers; 20th Army Troops Company, Royal Engineers; 215th Army Troops Company, Royal Engineers; 172nd Tunnelling Company, Royal Engineers; 176th Tunnelling Company, Royal Engineers; 182nd Tunnelling Company, Royal Engineers; 185th Tunnelling Company, Royal Engineers; 255th Tunnelling Company, Royal Engineers; 348th Field Company, Royal Engineers; 324th Quarry Company, Royal Engineers; 20th Light Railway Train Crews Company, Royal Engineers	
Royal Flying Corps		No. 16 Squadron, Royal Flying Corps; No. 1 Balloon Company, Royal Flying Corps; No. 2 Balloon Company, Royal Flying Corps	

1st Canadian Division (Major-General Arthur Currie)
Commander	Formation	Unit	Notes
(Divisional Troops)		13th Canadian Machine-Gun Company	
Brigadier-General Herbert Thacker (1st Canadian Divisional Artillery)	1st Brigade, Canadian Field Artillery	1st Field Battery; 3rd Field Battery; 4th Field Battery; 2nd Howitzer Battery	
Brigadier-General Herbert Thacker (1st Canadian Divisional Artillery)	2nd Brigade, Canadian Field Artillery	5th Field Battery; 6th Field Battery; 7th Field Battery; 48th Howitzer Battery	
Brigadier-General Herbert Thacker (1st Canadian Divisional Artillery)	3rd Brigade, Canadian Field Artillery	10th Field Battery; 11th Field Battery; 12th Field Battery; 9th Howitzer Battery	
Brigadier-General Herbert Thacker (1st Canadian Divisional Artillery)	1st Division Trench Mortar Group	V Canadian Heavy Trench Mortar Battery; X Canadian Trench Mortar Battery; Y Canadian Trench Mortar Battery; Z Canadian Trench Mortar Battery	
Brigadier-General Herbert Thacker (1st Canadian Divisional Artillery)		1st Division Ammunition Column; 1st Division Train	
Lieutenant-Colonel Alexander Macphail	1st Canadian Divisional Engineers	1st Field Company; 2nd Field Company; 3rd Field Company; 107th Canadian Pioneer Battalion; 1st Canadian Divisional Signal Company	
Colonel F. S. C. Ford	Assistant Medical Director, 1st Division	1st Field Ambulance; 2nd Field Ambulance; 3rd Field Ambulance; 1st Canadian Sanitary Section; 1st Canadian Mobile Veterinarian Section	
Brigadier-General William Griesbach	1st Canadian Infantry Brigade	1st (Western Ontario) Battalion; 2nd (Eastern Ontario) Battalion; 3rd (Toronto regiment) Battalion; 4th (Central Ontario) Battalion; 1st Light Trench Mortar Battery; 1st Canadian Machine-Gun Company	
Brigadier-General Frederick Loomis	2nd Canadian Infantry Brigade	5th (Western Cavalry) Battalion; 7th (British Columbia) Battalion; 8th (Winnipeg Rifles) Battalion; 10th (Canadians) Battalion; 2nd Light Trench Mortar Battery; 2nd Canadian Machine-Gun Company	
Brigadier-General George Tuxford	3rd Canadian Infantry Brigade	13th (Royal Highlanders of Canada) Battalion; 14th (Royal Montreal Regiment) Battalion; 15th (48th Highlanders of Canada) Battalion; 16th (The Canadian Scottish) Battalion; 3rd Light Trench Mortar Battery; 3rd Canadian Machine-Gun Company	
Troops attached to 1st Canadian Division
N/A (31st Divisional Artillery)	165th Brigade, Royal Field Artillery	A Field Battery; B Field Battery; C Field Battery; D Howitzer Battery	
N/A (31st Divisional Artillery)	170th Brigade, Royal Field Artillery	A Field Battery; B Field Battery; C Field Battery; D Howitzer Battery	
N/A (31st Divisional Artillery)		31st Divisional Ammunition Column	
	72nd (Army) Brigade, Royal Field Artillery	A Field Battery; B Field Battery; C Field Battery; D Howitzer Battery	
	26th (Army) Brigade, Royal Field Artillery	A Field Battery; 116th Field Battery; 117th Field Battery	
	5th (Army) Brigade, Royal Horse Artillery	G Field Battery; N Field Battery; O Field Battery; Z Field Battery	
		No.2 Special Company, Royal Engineers	

2nd Canadian Division (Major-General Henry Burstall)
Commander	Formation	Unit	Notes
(Divisional Troops)		14th Canadian Machine-Gun Company; 12 Company, D Battalion, Heavy Machine-Gun Corps	includes 8 x Mk II Tanks
Brigadier-General Henri Panet (2nd Canadian Divisional Artillery)	4th Brigade, Canadian Field Artillery		
Brigadier-General Henri Panet (2nd Canadian Divisional Artillery)	5th Brigade, Canadian Field Artillery	17th Field Battery; 18th Field Battery; 20th Field Battery; 23rd Howitzer Battery	
Brigadier-General Henri Panet (2nd Canadian Divisional Artillery)	6th Brigade, Canadian Field Artillery	15th Field Battery; 16th Field Battery; 25th Field Battery; 22nd Howitzer Battery	
Brigadier-General Henri Panet (2nd Canadian Divisional Artillery)	2nd Division Trench Mortar Group	V Canadian Heavy Trench Mortar Battery; X Canadian Trench Mortar Battery; Y Canadian Trench Mortar Battery; Z Canadian Trench Mortar Battery	
Brigadier-General Henri Panet (2nd Canadian Divisional Artillery)		2nd Division Ammunition Column; 2nd Division Train	
Lieutenant-Colonel S. H. Osler	2nd Canadian Divisional Engineers	4th Field Company; 5th Field Company; 6th Field Company; 2nd Canadian Divisional Signal Company; 2nd Canadian Pioneer Battalion	
Colonel H. M. Jacques	Assistant Medical Director, 2nd Division	No. 2 Canadian Casualty Clearing Station; 4th Field Ambulance; 5th Field Ambulance; 6th Field Ambulance; 2nd Canadian Sanitary Section; 2nd Canadian Mobile Veterinarian Section	
Brigadier-General Robert Rennie	4th Canadian Infantry Brigade	18th (Western Ontario) Battalion; 19th (Central Ontario) Battalion; 20th (Central Ontario) Battalion; 21st (Eastern Ontario) Battalion; 4th Light Trench Mortar Battery; 4th Canadian Machine-Gun Company	
Brigadier-General Archibald Macdonell	5th Canadian Infantry Brigade	22nd (Canadien Francais) Battalion; 24th (Victoria Rifles of Canada) Battalion; 25th (Nova Scotia Rifles) Battalion; 26th (New Brunswick) Battalion; 5th Light Trench Mortar Battery; 5th Canadian Machine-Gun Company	
Brigadier-General Huntly Ketchen	6th Canadian Infantry Brigade	27th (City of Winnipeg) Battalion; 28th (Northwest) Battalion; 29th (Vancouver) Battalion; 31st (Alberta) Battalion; 6th Light Trench Mortar Battery; 6th Canadian Machine-Gun Company	
Troops attached to 2nd Canadian Division
	28th (Army) Brigade, Royal Field Artillery	65th (Howitzer) Battery; 122nd Battery; 123rd Battery; 124th Battery	
	93rd (Army) Brigade, Royal Field Artillery	A Field Battery; B Field Battery; C Field Battery	
		D Special Company, Royal Engineers	

3rd Canadian Division (Major-General Louis Lipsett)
Commander	Formation	Unit	Notes
(Divisional Troops)		15th Canadian Machine-Gun Company	
Brigadier-General J. H. Mitchell (3rd Canadian Divisional Artillery)	8th Brigade, Canadian Field Artillery	24th Field Battery; 30th Field Battery; 32nd Field Battery; 43rd Howitzer Battery	
Brigadier-General J. H. Mitchell (3rd Canadian Divisional Artillery)	9th Brigade, Canadian Field Artillery	31st Field Battery; 33rd Field Battery; 45th Field Battery; 36th Howitzer Battery	
Brigadier-General J. H. Mitchell (3rd Canadian Divisional Artillery)	10th Brigade, Canadian Field Artillery	38th Field Battery; 39th Field Battery; 40th Field Battery	
Brigadier-General J. H. Mitchell (3rd Canadian Divisional Artillery)	3rd Division Trench Mortar Group	V Canadian Heavy Trench Mortar Battery; X Canadian Trench Mortar Battery; Y Canadian Trench Mortar Battery; Z Canadian Trench Mortar Battery	
Brigadier-General J. H. Mitchell (3rd Canadian Divisional Artillery)		3rd Division Ammunition Column; 3rd Divisional Train	
Lieutenant-Colonel Thomas Anderson	3rd Canadian Divisional Engineers	7th Field Company; 8th Field Company; 9th Field Company; 3rd Canadian Pioneer Battalion; 123rd Canadian Pioneer Battalion; 3rd Canadian Divisional Signal Company	
Colonel A. E. Snell	Assistant Director Medical Services, 3rd Division	No. 3 Canadian Casualty Clearing Station; 8th Field Ambulance; 9th Field Ambulance; 10th Field Ambulance; 3rd Canadian Sanitary Section; 3rd Canadian Mobile Veterinarian Section	
Brigadier-General Archibald Macdonell	7th Canadian Infantry Brigade	The Royal Canadian Regiment; Princess Patricia's Canadian Light Infantry; 42nd (Royal Highlanders of Canada) Battalion; 49th (Edmonton Regiment) Battalion; 7th Light Trench Mortar Battery; 7th Canadian Machine-Gun Company	
Brigadier-General James H. Elmsley	8th Canadian Infantry Brigade	1st Battalion Canadian Mounted Rifles; 2nd Battalion Canadian Mounted Rifles; 4th Battalion Canadian Mounted Rifles; 5th Battalion Canadian Mounted Rifles; 8th Light Trench Mortar Battery; 8th Canadian Machine-Gun Company	
Brigadier-General Frederick Hill	9th Canadian Infantry Brigade	43rd (Cameron Highlanders of Canada) Battalion; 52nd (New Ontario) Battalion; 58th (Central Ontario) Battalion; 60th (Victoria rifles of Canada) Battalion; 116th (Ontario County) Battalion; 9th Light Trench Mortar Battery; 9th Canadian Machine-Gun Company	
Troops attached to 3rd Canadian Division
Brigadier-General Cecil De Rougemont (63rd (Royal Naval) Division Artillery)	223rd Brigade, Royal Field Artillery	A Field Battery; B Field Battery; C Field Battery; D Howitzer Battery	
Brigadier-General Cecil De Rougemont (63rd (Royal Naval) Division Artillery)	317th Brigade, Royal Field Artillery	A Field Battery; B Field Battery; C Field Battery; D Howitzer Battery	
Brigadier-General Cecil De Rougemont (63rd (Royal Naval) Division Artillery)		63rd Divisional Ammunition Column	
		No.4 Special Company, Royal Engineers	

4th Canadian Division (Major-General David Watson)
Commander	Formation	Unit	Notes
(Divisional Troops)		16th Canadian Machine-Gun Company	
N/A; 3rd (Lahore) Division Artillery)	5th Brigade, Royal Field Artillery	64th Field Battery; 73rd Field Battery; 81st Field Battery; D Howitzer Battery	
N/A; 3rd (Lahore) Division Artillery)	11th Brigade, Royal Field Artillery	83rd Field Battery; 84th Field Battery; 85th Field Battery; D Howitzer Battery	
N/A; 3rd (Lahore) Division Artillery)	Reserve Divisional Trench Mortar Group	V Heavy Trench Mortar Battery; X Trench Mortar Battery; Y Trench Mortar Battery; Z Trench Mortar Battery	
N/A; 3rd (Lahore) Division Artillery)		4th Division Ammunition Column; 4th Division Train	
Lieutenant-Colonel Thomas Irving	4th Canadian Divisional Engineers	10th Field Company; 11th Field Company; 12th Field Company; 67th Canadian Pioneers Battalion; 124th Canadian Pioneers Battalion; 4th Canadian Divisional Signal Company	
Major J. S. Jenkins	Assistant Director Medical Services, 4th Division	No. 4 Canadian Casualty Clearing Station; 11th Field Ambulance; 12th Field Ambulance; 13th Field Ambulance; 4th Canadian Sanitary Section; 4th Canadian Mobile Veterinarian Section	
Brigadier-General Edward Hilliam	10th Canadian Infantry Brigade	44th (Manitoba) Battalion; 46th (Regina and Moose Jaw) Battalion; 47th (British Columbia) Battalion; 50th (Calgary) Battalion; 10th Light Trench Mortar Battery; 10th Canadian Machine-Gun Company	
Brigadier-General Victor Odlum	11th Canadian Infantry Brigade	54th (Kootenay) Battalion; 75th (Mississauga) Battalion; 87th (Canadian Grenadier Guards) Battalion; 102nd (Northern British Columbia) Battalion; 11th Light Trench Mortar Battery; 11th Canadian Machine-Gun Company	
Brigadier-General James MacBrien	12th Canadian Infantry Brigade	38th (Ottawa) Battalion; 72nd (Seaforth Highlanders of Canada) Battalion; 73rd (Royal Highlanders of Canada) Battalion; 78th (Winnipeg Grenadiers) Battalion; 85th (Nova Scotia Highlanders) Battalion; 12th Light Trench Mortar Battery; 12th Canadian Machine-Gun Company	
Troops attached to 4th Canadian Division
Brigadier-General G. H. Sanders (2nd Divisional Artillery)	41st Brigade, Royal Field Artillery	9th Field Battery; 16th Field Battery; 17th Field Battery; 47th Howitzer Battery	
Brigadier-General G. H. Sanders (2nd Divisional Artillery)	36th Brigade, Royal Field Artillery	36th Field Battery; 48th Field Battery; 71st Field Battery; D Howitzer Battery	
	18th (Army) Brigade, Royal Field Artillery	A Field Battery; 59th Field Battery; 91st Field Battery; D Howitzer Battery	
	76th (Army) Brigade, Royal Field Artillery	A Field Battery; B Field Battery; C Field Battery; D Howitzer Battery	
	242nd (III South Midland) (Army) Brigade, Royal Field Artillery	A Field Battery; B Field Battery; C Field Battery; D Howitzer Battery	
		F Special Company, Royal Engineers; M Special Company, Royal Engineers; N Special Company, Royal Engineers	

British 5th Division (attached from I Corps) (Major-General R. B. Stephens)
Commander	Formation	Unit	Notes
(Divisional Troops)		205th Machine-Gun Company	Attached to 4th Canadian Division
N/A (5th Divisional Artillery)	15th Brigade, Royal Field Artillery	D (Howitzer) Battery; 52nd Battery; 81st Battery; A Battery	Attached to 2nd Canadian Division
N/A (5th Divisional Artillery)	27th Brigade, Royal Field Artillery	37th (Howitzer) Battery; 119th Battery; 120th Battery; 121st Battery	Attached to 2nd Canadian Division
N/A (5th Divisional Artillery)		5th Divisional Ammunition Column	Attached to 2nd Canadian Division
N/A (5th Divisional Artillery)	5th Division Trench Mortar	V Canadian Heavy Trench Mortar Battery; X Canadian Trench Mortar Battery; Y Canadian Trench Mortar Battery; Z Canadian Trench Mortar Battery	
N/A (5th Divisional Artillery)		5th Divisional Train	
N/A	5th Divisional Engineers	59th Field Company, Royal Engineers; 491st (2nd Home Counties) Field Company, Royal Engineers; 527th (2nd Durham) Field Company, Royal Engineers; 5th Division Signal Company; 1st/6th (Renfrewshire) Battalion, Argyll & Sutherland Highlanders (Pioneers)	
Brigadier-General L. O. W. Jones	13th Infantry Brigade	2nd Battalion, King's Own Scottish Borderers; 1st Battalion, Royal West Kent Regiment; 14th (1st Birmingham) Battalion, Royal Warwickshire Regiment; 15th (2nd Birmingham) Battalion, Royal Warwickshire Regiment; 13th Machine-Gun Company; 13th Light Trench Mortar Company	Attached to 2nd Canadian Division
Brigadier-General Lord Esme Gordon-Lennox	95th Infantry Brigade	1st Battalion, Devonshire Regiment; 1st Battalion, East Surrey Regiment; 1st Battalion, Duke of Cornwall's Light Infantry; 12th Battalion, Gloucestershire Regiment; 95th Machine-Gun Company; 95th Light Trench Mortar Company	
Brigadier-General M. N. Turner	15th Infantry Brigade	16th (3rd Birmingham) Battalion, Royal Warwickshire Regiment; 1st Battalion, Norfolk Regiment; 1st Battalion, Bedfordshire Regiment; 1st Battalion, Cheshire Regiment; 15th Machine-Gun Company; 15th Light Trench Mortar Company	

== Central Powers forces ==
German Sixth Army commander General Ludwig von Falkenhausen had 20 divisions (plus reserves) responsible for the Cambrai–Lille sector. Vimy Ridge itself was principally defended by the ad hoc Gruppe Vimy formation under the I Bavarian Reserve Corps commander General der Infanterie Karl von Fasbender. A division of Gruppe Souchez, under the VIII Reserve Corps commander, General Georg Karl Wichura, was also involved in the front-line defence along the northernmost portion of the ridge.

Three divisions were ultimately responsible for manning the front-line defences opposite the Canadian Corps. The 16th Bavarian Infantry Division was located opposite the town of Souchez and responsible for the defence of the northernmost section of the ridge. The division had been created in January 1917 from existing Bavarian formations and had so far only opposed the Canadian Corps. The 79th Reserve Division was responsible for the defence of the central section, including the highest point of the ridge, Hill 145. The 79th Reserve Division had fought for two years on the Eastern Front and was transferred to the Vimy sector at the end of February 1917. The 1st Bavarian Reserve Division had been in the Arras area since October 1914 and was holding the villages of Thélus, Bailleul and the southern slope of the ridge.

=== I Bavarian Reserve Corps ===
Gruppe Vimy – I Bavarian Reserve Corps (General der Infanterie Karl Ritter von Fasbender)
Corps level troops
Commander	Formation	Unit	Notes
	9th Field Artillery Regiment		
	69th Field Artillery Regiment	1st Battery; 3rd Battery	
	25th Reserve Field Artillery Regiment	3rd Battery	
	66th Reserve Field Artillery Regiment	4th Battery; 6th Battery	

79th Reserve Division (Lieutenant-General Ernst August Marx von Bacmeister)
Commander	Formation	Unit	Notes
Colonel Bleidorn (79th Reserve Field Artillery Brigade)	63rd Reserve Field Artillery Regiment	2nd Battery; 3rd Battery; 8th Battery	
N/A (Cavalry Squadron)			
N/A (Engineers)			
N/A (Medical)			
Lieutenant-General Alfred Dieterich (79th Reserve Brigade)	261st Reserve Infantry Regiment	1st Battalion; 2nd Battalion; 3rd Battalion	
Lieutenant-General Alfred Dieterich (79th Reserve Brigade)	262nd Reserve Infantry Regiment	1st Battalion; 2nd Battalion; 3rd Battalion	
Lieutenant-General Alfred Dieterich (79th Reserve Brigade)	263rd Reserve Infantry Regiment	1st Battalion; 2nd Battalion; 3rd Battalion	
Troops attached to 79th Reserve Division
(56th Infantry Division)	118th Reserve Infantry Regiment	1st Battalion	Battle reinforcement, sent on 9 April
(80th Infantry Division)	34th Bavarian Reserve Infantry Regiment	3rd Battalion	Battle reinforcement, sent on 9 April

1st Bavarian Reserve Division (Major-General Friedrich Freiherr von Pechmann)
Commander	Formation	Unit	Notes
Colonel Graf von Zech auf Neuhofen (13th Bavarian Artillery Command)	1st Bavarian Reserve Field Artillery Regiment		
N/A (Cavalry Squadron)	3rd Chevauxleger Regiment	3rd Squadron	
N/A (Engineers)		17th Bavarian Pioneer Battalion; 1st Bavarian Reserve Pioneer Company; 3rd Bavarian Reserve Pioneer Company; 7th Bavarian Reserve Pioneer Company; 201 Trench Mortar Company; 1st Bavarian Reserve Searchlight Section; 401st Bavarian Telephone Detachment	
N/A (Medical)		15th Bavarian Ambulance Company; 45th Bavarian Field Hospital; 48th Bavarian Field Hospital; 49th Bavarian Field Hospital; Veterinary Hospital	
Major-General Lamprecht (1st Bavarian Reserve Infantry Brigade)	1st Bavarian Reserve Infantry Regiment	1st Battalion; 2nd Battalion; 3rd Battalion	
Major-General Lamprecht (1st Bavarian Reserve Infantry Brigade)	3rd Bavarian Reserve Infantry Regiment	1st Battalion; 2nd Battalion; 3rd Battalion	
Troops attached to 1st Bavarian Reserve Division
(17th Division)	225th Infantry Regiment	1st Battalion	Battle reinforcement, sent on 9 April

=== VIII Reserve Corps ===
Gruppe Souchez – VIII Reserve Corps (General der Infanterie Georg Karl Wichura)
Corps level troops
Commander	Formation	Unit	Notes

16th Bavarian Infantry Division (Major-General Arnold Ritter von Mohl)
Commander	Formation	Unit	Notes
Major-General Treutlein-Mordes (16th Bavarian Artillery Command)	8th Bavarian Field Artillery Regiment	3rd Battery	
N/A (Cavalry Squadron)			
N/A (Engineers)			
N/A (Medical)			
Major-General Lamprecht (9th Bavarian Infantry Brigade)	11th Bavarian Regiment	1st Battalion; 2nd Battalion; 3rd Battalion	
Major-General Lamprecht (9th Bavarian Infantry Brigade)	14th Bavarian Regiment	1st Battalion; 2nd Battalion; 3rd Battalion	1st Battalion used as battle reinforcements, 2nd Battalion kept in reserve
Major-General Lamprecht (9th Bavarian Infantry Brigade)	21st Bavarian Reserve Infantry Regiment	1st Battalion	Battle reinforcements, remainder of regiment not committed
Troops attached to 16th Bavarian Infantry Division
(4th Guards Division)	5th Grenadier Guard Regiment	Fusilier Battalion	Battle reinforcements
(4th Guards Division)	93rd Reserve Infantry Regiment	1st Battalion	Battle reinforcements
