= Operation Windsor =

1944 Canadian operation in Normandy during WWII

- Part of Battle for Caen
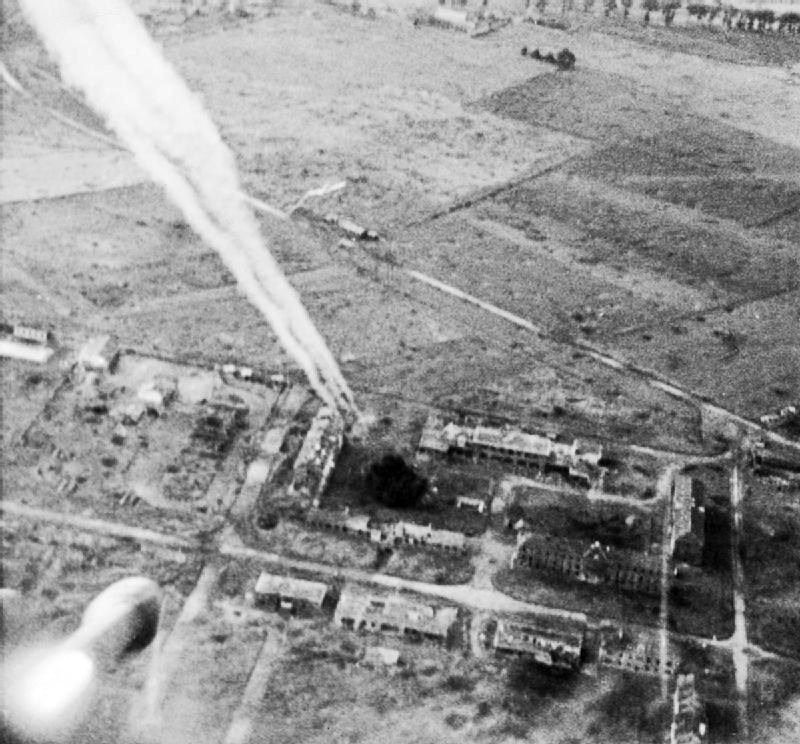
- Rockets fired from a Hawker Typhoon of No 181 Squadron, RAF, at buildings on Carpiquet airfield. The 3rd Canadian Division took Carpiquet on 4 July.
Date	4–5 July 1944
Location	Carpiquet, Normandy, France 49.185°N 0.445°W
Result	Canadian victory
Territorial changes	Carpiquet village captured by the Canadians

Belligerents
Canada; United Kingdom	Germany

Commanders and leaders
(Canada) Rod Keller	(Nazi Germany) Kurt Meyer

Strength
4 Infantry Battalions; 1 Machine Gun Battalion; 2 Armoured Regiments	1 battalion each from SS Panzergrenadier Regiments 26 and 1; 1 Flak Battery; 15 tanks initially

Casualties and losses
377 casualties 17 tanks	c. 270 infantry, c. 20 tanks

Operation Windsor (4–5 July 1944), was a Canadian attack of the Battle of Normandy during the Second World War. The attack was undertaken by the 3rd Canadian Infantry Division to take Carpiquet and the adjacent airfield from troops of the 12th SS-Panzer Division Hitler Jugend of Panzergruppe West. The attack was originally intended to take place during the later stages of Operation Epsom, to protect the eastern flank of the main assault but was postponed for a week.

On 4 July, the 8th Canadian Infantry Brigade and an attached battalion of the 3rd Canadian Infantry Division attacked Carpiquet, supported on the flanks by the 2nd Canadian Armoured Brigade. The village was captured by mid-afternoon but German resistance in the south defeated two attacks on the airfield, despite significant Allied tank and air support. Next day the Canadians repulsed German counter-attacks and held the village, which served as a base for Operation Charnwood, a Second Army attack on Caen, involving the rest of the 3rd Canadian Infantry Division on 8 July, and the airfield was captured by the Canadians on 9 July.

== Background ==
Caen was an Operation Overlord goal for I Corps of the Anglo-Canadian Second Army, which landed forces on two Normandy beaches on 6 June 1944, to capture the city and the Carpiquet area. German resistance prevented the town from being captured on D-Day, a result considered possible by Lieutenant-General Miles Dempsey the Second Army commander. For the next three weeks, positional warfare took place around Caen as both sides attacked and counter-attacked for minor tactical advantage on the Anglo-Canadian front and as part of a strategic intent to force the Germans to keep their most powerful armoured units away from the US First Army, as it captured Cherbourg and then pushed southwards through the bocage towards St. Lô.

From 26–30 June, the Second Army conducted Operation Epsom, with the VIII Corps which had recently arrived from Britain, to outflank Caen from the west and seize the high ground across the Orne near Bretteville-sur-Laize to the south. VIII Corps advanced 6 mi (9.7 km) through extensive field fortifications but the Germans were able to contain the offensive, after committing their last reserves. Depending on the success of VIII Corps, the 3rd Canadian Infantry Division and the 2nd Canadian Armoured Brigade were to capture the village and airfield of Carpiquet in Operation Ottawa, which was postponed.

After the Allied advance to the west of Caen, the I SS Panzer Corps held positions to the north and west of the city. Field defences on the River Orne and the vicinity of Carpiquet, 3.5 mi (5.6 km) north-west of the Caen town centre, obstructed an advance toward Caen from the north. The village was made an objective of the 3rd Canadian Infantry Division, under the command of Major-General R. F. L. Keller. The Allied need for additional airfields on the Normandy mainland, ensured that the capture of the Carpiquet area was a priority for the Allies and an equally important defensive position for the Germans.

== Prelude ==
=== German defences ===
Topography of the area west of Caen

Carpiquet airfield was on a 1.2 mi (1.9 km) expanse of level ground, which offered a "killing ground" for the defenders. The airfield had been fortified with minefields, field gun and machine gun emplacements, manned by I Battalion, SS-Panzergrenadier Regiment 26, an anti-aircraft battery and fifteen tanks.

=== Allied forces ===
Keller selected the 8th Canadian Infantry Brigade, comprising The Queen's Own Rifles of Canada (QOR), Le Régiment de la Chaudière and The North Shore (New Brunswick) Regiment; The Royal Winnipeg Rifles (RWR) were attached from the 7th Canadian Infantry Brigade to lead the assault. Tank and machine-gun support was to be provided by the 10th Armoured Regiment (The Fort Garry Horse), The Sherbrooke Fusiliers and the Cameron Highlanders Support Battalion. Two squadrons of Hawker Typhoon fighter-bombers and three squadrons of specialized tanks from the 79th Armoured Division were added later. On the evening of 3 July, the battleship HMS Rodney bombarded the buildings around Carpiquet from the Bay of the Seine at 26,200 yd (24,000 m) range, with fifteen shells from its 16 in (410 mm) guns.

Operation Windsor was planned to commence at 05:00 on 4 July, following a bombardment by 21 artillery regiments, with Le Régiment de la Chaudière and The North Shore Regiment attacking Carpiquet, as a squadron of the Sherbrooke Fusiliers protected the northern flank with a diversionary attack on Franqueville. To the south, the RWR was to advance and seize the hangars of Carpiquet airfield. At the same time as the Canadian attack, the 43rd Division was to attack further south down the north side of the Odon to capture Verson. Once the regiments had captured Carpiquet, the QOR would push through and take control of the airfield control buildings. The capture of the airfield would enable further Anglo-Canadian attacks against Caen.

== Battle ==
=== 4 July ===
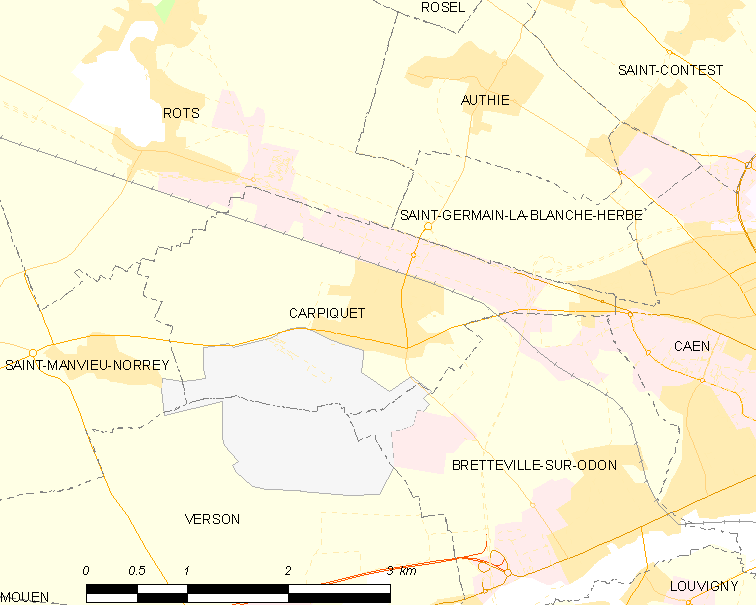
Map of Carpiquet area, commune FR insee code 14137

As dawn broke on 4 July the artillery regiments opened fire on German positions in and around Carpiquet, firing a creeping barrage 1 mi (1.6 km) wide and 400 yd (370 m) deep. At 05:00 two Canadian infantry battalions advanced on Carpiquet, while the Sherbrooke Fusilier squadron staged the diversion to the north. The Sherbooke Fusiliers broke through the German minefields and attacked Chateau-St-Louet and Gruchy before withdrawing but the defensive positions of SS Panzergrenadier Regiment 26 remained intact and continued to fire on the North Shores. In the centre, the Chaudières avoided much of the fire directed at the North Shores as they advanced on Carpiquet. By 06:32, both battalions had reached the outskirts of the village and met tanks of the 12th SS Panzer Division. In the village, a house-to-house fight began and tanks of the 10th Canadian Armoured Regiment assisted the infantry in overrunning German positions.

To the south, the RWR advanced slowly towards the airfield, with German mortar fire inflicting many casualties on the infantry and tanks. With a squadron of the Fort Garry Horse only available for indirect fire, it took the RWR ninety minutes to advance the 1.5 mi (2.4 km) from Marcelet to the airfield hangars, under fire from the south bank of the Odon. Several Sherman tanks were knocked out and by mid-day the RWR were forced to withdraw halfway to their original positions.

Unaware that the RWR had failed to gain control of the airfield, Keller sent the QOR to begin the second phase of the assault. The battalion moved forward into Carpiquet village, which was occupied by the Chaudières and The North Shore, who attacked German strong points bypassed in the initial assault. Infantry attacks, flame-throwers, petard-tanks (Churchill tanks mounted with a 290 mm (11 in) spigot mortar) and the immolation of one strong point forced twelve surviving defenders to surrender; the remaining garrison surrendered after determined resistance. The QOR reached the edge of Carpiquet as the RWR withdrew and was ordered to hold their positions until the RWR reorganized for a second attack.

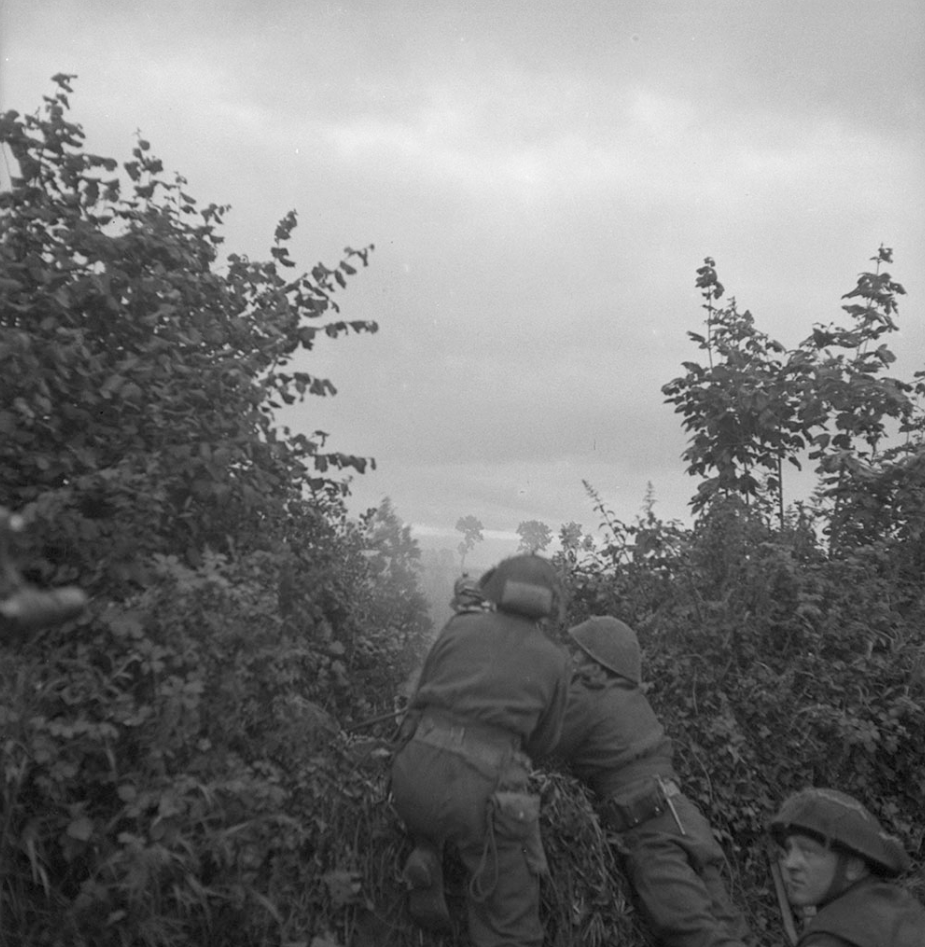
Canadian Army machine-gunners in action near Carpiquet, 4 July 1944

For the second attack on the airfield, Keller obtained the support of two squadrons of Typhoon fighter-bombers. The survivors of the RWR were ordered to "execute a sweeping attack by the lower ground around the enemy's left flank", with tank and artillery support, under the impression that the 43rd Division had reached Verson, although this position could not prevent a counter-attack from the south-east. In the late afternoon, the RWR resumed the attack on the airfield and reached the hangars but were unable to dislodge the German defenders. The Fort Garry tanks encountered a battlegroup of Panther tanks and was overwhelmed, the RWR was ordered to withdraw to their start-line under the cover of darkness. In Carpiquet, the 8th Canadian Infantry Brigade rapidly consolidated its positions, which were the closest to Caen of any Allied unit. Although the Canadians had control of Carpiquet and the northern hangars, the southern hangars and control buildings remained in German hands.

=== 5 July ===
Less than 1 mi (1.6 km) from the outskirts of Caen, the 8th Canadian Infantry Brigade posed a threat to German positions in the town. With most of the defence concentrated north of Caen and by the River Odon, it was feared by the Germans that Anglo-Canadian forces could attack from Carpiquet and bypass the majority of the defences. Despite growing misgivings about the effectiveness of immediate counter-attacks, Kurt Meyer ordered the SS to retake Carpiquet. Units from the 1st SS-Panzer Division prepared to counter-attack Carpiquet from Francqueville with tanks, artillery, mortars and infantry.

Shortly after midnight, the first of the SS counter-attacks began and although thirteen tanks had been lost the previous day, the 10th Canadian Armoured Regiment and the mortars of the Cameron Highlanders defeated the attack and inflicted many casualties. By dawn, almost no ground had been gained by the attackers and by noon, the 8th Canadian Infantry Brigade and 10th Canadian Armoured Regiment had defeated three counter-attacks, with the assistance of artillery and Typhoon fighter-bombers. The village remained firmly in Canadian occupation, although subject to frequent Nebelwerfer and mortar bombardment.

== Aftermath ==
=== Analysis ===
Operation Charnwood, 8–9 July 1944

Windsor was the first set-piece attack by the 3rd Canadian Division and left the Germans in control of Carpiquet airport, which obliged the 43rd Division to retire from Verson and Fontaine-Etoupefour. In 2005, Reid wrote that the attack should have been made by two brigades rather than one and an attached battalion. The extra battalion reached the hangars and fought their way through them but were ordered to withdraw twice. The success of the German defenders in maintaining their hold on the airfield, except for the north end and Carpiquet village, left the Canadians in a salient which was counter-attacked several times. The failure of the brigade to reach all its objectives, led to doubts about the fitness of Keller for his command, although the preparations for Operation Charnwood might have been the reason for Keller delegating planning for Operation Windsor to the 8th Canadian Infantry Brigade commander, Brigadier K. G. Blackader.

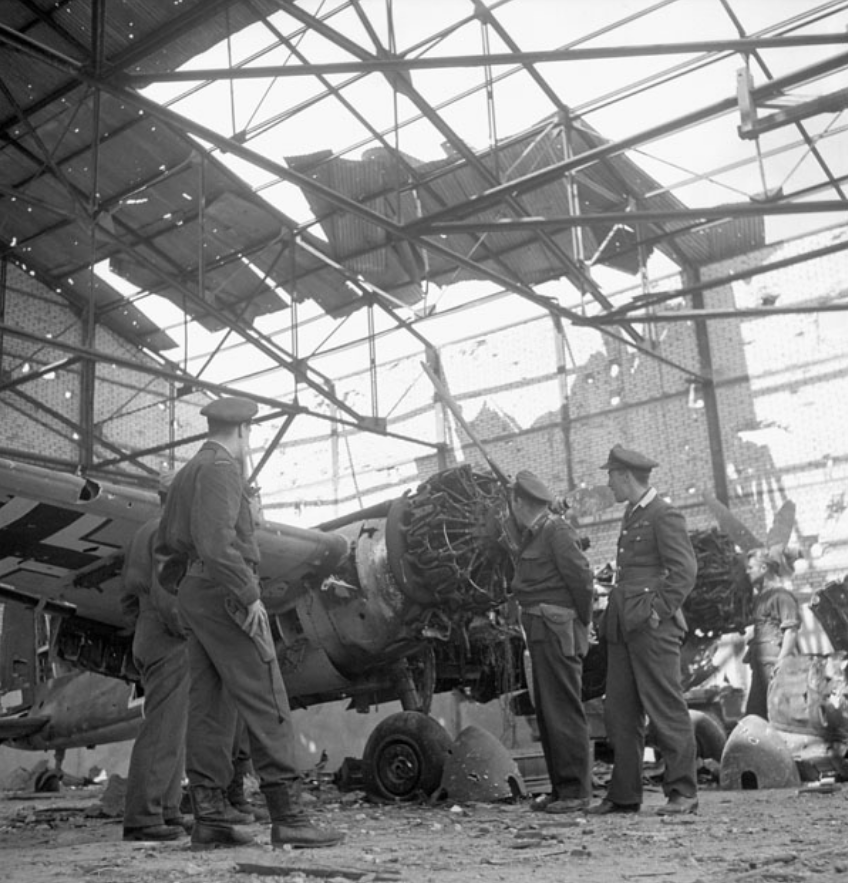
Canadian officers examining a Luftwaffe Henschel Hs-129 damaged during the fighting for Carpiquet Airfield, 12 July 1944

Three days after Operation Windsor, the 3rd Canadian Infantry Division took part in Operation Charnwood. On 9 July, the 8th Canadian Infantry Brigade captured Carpiquet airfield and by nightfall, the northern half of Caen had been captured. On 18 July British and Canadian forces launched Operation Atlantic and Operation Goodwood in which the Canadians captured the Caen districts on the south bank and the British captured ground to the east and south of the city. Canadian forces then attacked German positions on Verrières Ridge in Operation Spring.

=== Casualties ===
Canadian casualties for the operation totalled 377, of which 127 men were killed, most on 4 July. The RWR and The North Shores each lost 132 casualties. The 10th Canadian Armoured Regiment lost 17 tanks and an unknown number of tanks were lost by the Sherbrooke Fusiliers. The I Battalion, Panzer-grenadier Regiment 26 had 155 infantry casualties and the 1st SS-Panzer Division (Leibstandarte Adolf Hitler), which counter-attacked on 5 July, lost c. 20 tanks. II Battalion, Panzer-grenadier Regiment 1 had 115 casualties.
