= Charles Basil Price =

Canadian Army officer (1890–1975)

- Major-General Charles Basil Price, pictured here at age 79 in July 1970.
- Born: 12 December 1890; Aldershot, England
- Died: 15 February 1975 (aged 84); Pierrefonds, Quebec
- Burial place: Lac-Brome, Quebec
- Spouse: Marjorie Trenholme (m. 1915)
- Children: 6
- Relatives: Diana Weston (granddaughter)
- Military career
- Allegiance: Canada
- Branch: Canadian Army
- Service years: 1905–1945
- Rank: Major-General
- Nickname: "C.B"
- Units: Victoria Rifles of Canada; 14th Battalion (Royal Montreal Regiment), CEF
- Commands: The Royal Montreal Regiment; 3rd Canadian Infantry Brigade; 3rd Canadian Infantry Division
- Conflicts: World War I World War II
- Awards: Distinguished Service Order; Distinguished Conduct Medal; Companion of the Order of the Bath

Major-General Charles Basil Price (12 December 1890 − 15 February 1975) was a Canadian Army officer who served in both of the world wars.

== Early life ==
He joined the Victoria Rifles of Canada in 1905 and received an officer's commission in 1914. Soon after, he responded to the outbreak of World War I by resigning his commission to join the Royal Montreal Regiment as a company sergeant-major. He became a commissioned officer again through a series of promotions.

== The Great War and after ==
As a major in the Royal Montreal Regiment, he received the Distinguished Service Order and the Distinguished Conduct Medal. The citation for his DSO, awarded for his actions during Canada's Hundred Days, reads:

For sound ability in handling his battalion and great gallantry in the attack on the Canal du Nord on 27th September, 1918. He successfully gained all his objectives and captured and cleared up the village of Sains-les-Marqulon, and, though wounded, refused to be evacuated until his colonel, arriving opportunely from leave as the barrage started, arrived on the scene and relieved him. He had complete grasp of the situation at all times.

He married Marjorie Trenholme (3 November 1891 – 1 September 1979) on 23 August 1915. The couple raised six children: Marjorie (1918–1988), Lyall (1920–1942), Helen (1922–2014), Ann (1928–1997), Isabel (1930–1997), and John (1930–1993). He was promoted to lieutenant-colonel and took command of the Royal Montreal Regiment until his retirement on 31 December 1929. As a civilian, he became managing director of Elmhurst Dairy. In January 1931 he became an alderman in Westmount.

In 1939 he was President of the Brome Lake Boating Club at Knowlton, Quebec.

== World War II and postwar life ==
He re-enlisted and was posted to the United Kingdom. As a major-general, he commanded the 3rd Canadian Infantry Division from 14 March 1941 until 7 September 1942, when he became the Overseas Commissioner of the Canadian Red Cross Society. In that post, which he held until the war ended, he strove to ensure that all Allied prisoners of war received equal benefits, including one large Red Cross parcel per month containing the best food available (white-flour biscuits; butter instead of oleomargarine, etc.). In 1944 he joined John Bracken's team as the Progressive Conservative candidate in Saint-Antoine—Westmount, and lost to the Liberal incumbent Douglas Charles Abbott by just 60 votes in the 1945 federal election. Later he retired and moved to Knowlton.

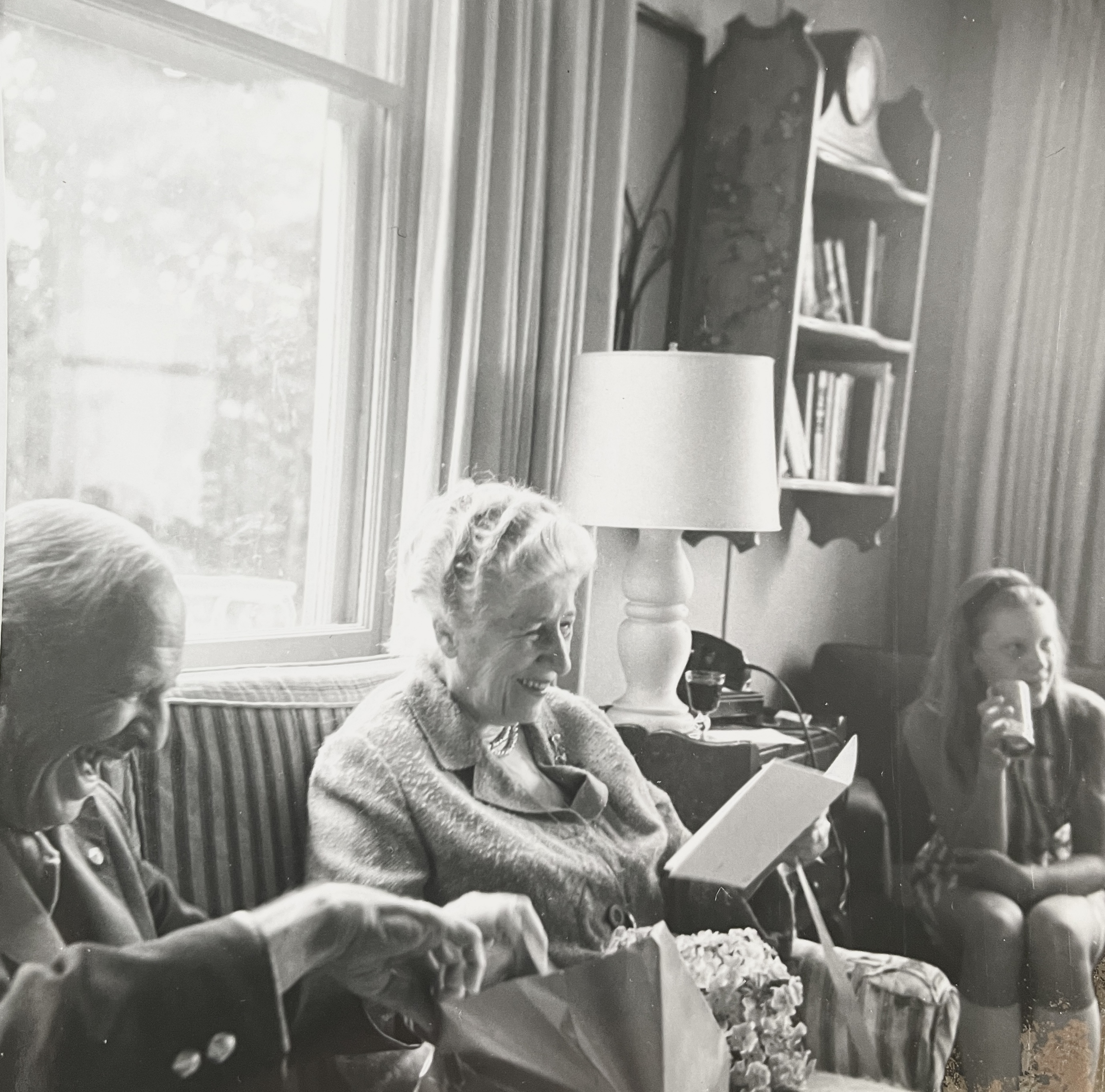
C.B. Price and his wife Marjorie celebrate their Golden Anniversary with a grandchild (Diana Weston), 23 August 1965.

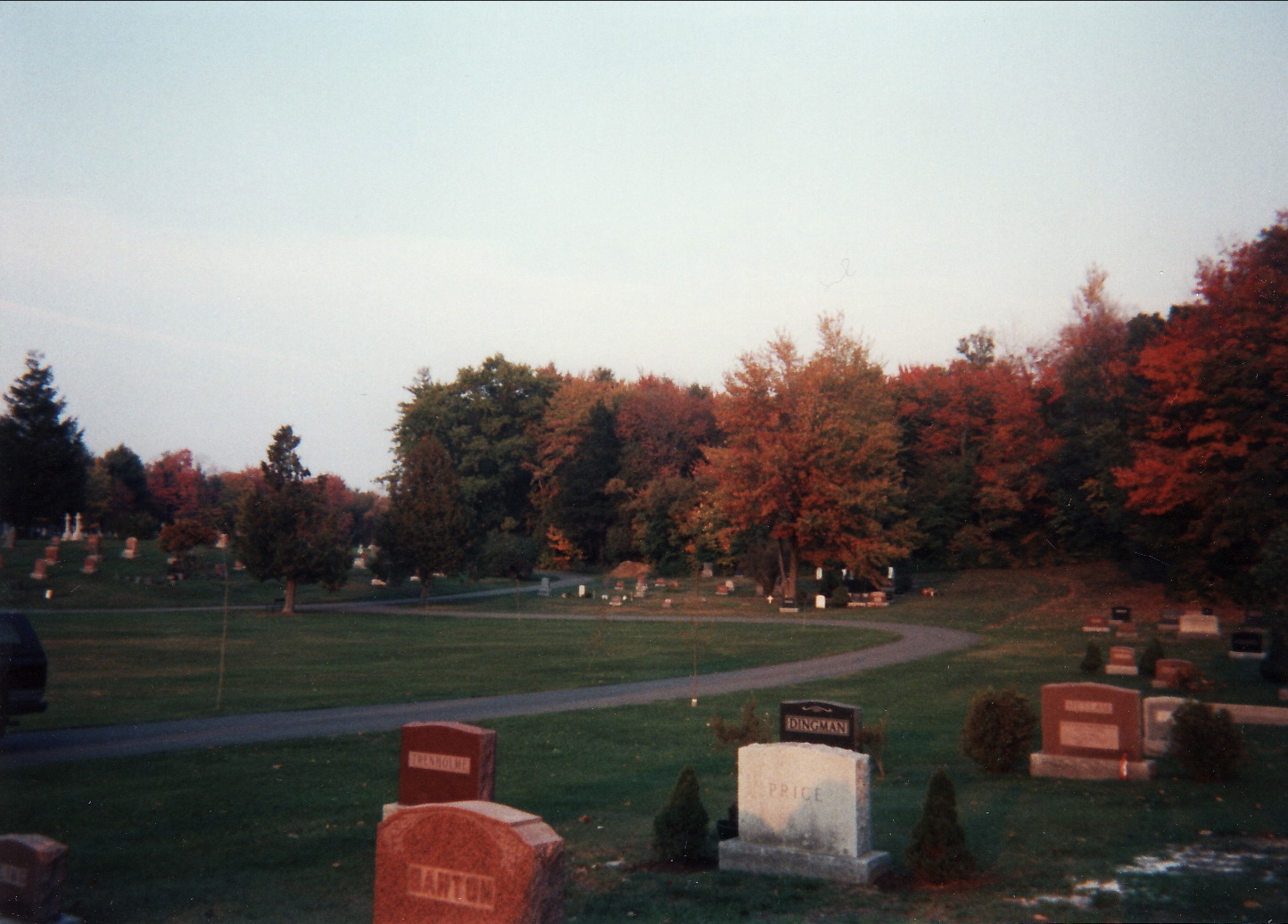
Resting place (white headstone) of C.B. and Marjorie at Knowlton Cemetery, 2 October 1991

== Sources ==
- Stacey, Colonel C. P. (1955). Six Years of War: The Army in Canada, Britain and the Pacific. Ottawa: Queen's Printer and Controller of Stationery.
- Vance, Jonathan F. (1997). Objects of Concern: Canadian Prisoners of War Through the Twentieth Century. Vancouver: University of British Columbia Press.
- The Shawinigan Standard, 23 November 1938, Page 1.

Military offices
Preceded by Ernest William Sansom	GOC 3rd Canadian Infantry Division; 1941–1942	Succeeded by Rod Keller
