= László Nagy (Scouting) =

Hungarian jurist, writer, scouting pioneer

- Born: 2 September 1921; Budapest, Kingdom of Hungary
- Died: 18 December 2009 (aged 88); Geneva, Switzerland

László Nagy (2 September 1921 – 18 December 2009; Hungarian pronunciation: [ˈlaːsloː ˈnɒɟ]) was the Secretary General of the World Organization of the Scout Movement from 1 May 1968 to 31 October 1988. A Swiss citizen of Hungarian origin, he was a sociologist, a historian, a Doctor of Political Science, a former journalist and the author of a number of books on politics.

== Biography ==
Nagy was born in Budapest, Kingdom of Hungary, in 1921, discovered Scouting and went on to become an assistant Scoutmaster. He attended the 4th World Scout Jamboree held in Gödöllő, Hungary in 1933.

Nagy received a Masters in sociology and law, and a PhD in political science. He was a graduate of the business administration school at the University of Geneva. He studied for many years under the direction of child psychologist Jean Piaget. Later, he became the Director of Study and Head of the Department of Research and Documentation at the Graduate Institute of International Studies in Geneva.

Nagy was also a journalist and author. He was Foreign Editor of the Gazette de Lausanne. Internationally, he was recognised as an authority on the problems of Eastern Europe and of Sub-Saharan Africa. The books he authored included Imre Nagy, Katanga, Lenin and History of People's Democracies.

In 1965, he undertook a two-year critical study of the world Scouting movement around the world, sponsored by the Ford Foundation and appointed by the Graduate Institute of International Studies. Nagy published the Report on World Scouting in June 1967. In the course of the study, much data was compiled for the first time about worldwide Scouting, with many international trips made and interviews conducted. In the report, Nagy analysed the problems and strengths of World Scouting.

The 1967 World Scout Conference accepted the Nagy Report and its many recommendations for the improvement and reorganisation of World Scouting. In 1968, WOSM invited him to put his recommendations into practice and appointed him as the WOSM secretary general for a three-year term, which ultimately lasted for 20 years.

Nagy was awarded the Bronze Wolf, the only distinction of the World Organization of the Scout Movement, awarded by the World Scout Committee for exceptional services to world Scouting, in 1977. In 1987, he also received the highest distinction of the Scout Association of Japan, the Golden Pheasant Award.

Nagy was married to the former Monique Cuendet, a Genovese artist, and had two sons, Antoine (born in 1958) and Laurent (born in 1960) and a daughter, Anns Valerie (born in 1962).

== Books published ==
- László, Nagy (1985). 250 Million Scouts. Dartnell Publishers. ISBN 978-0850131536.

== See also ==
- List of recipients of the Bronze Wolf Award

World Organization of the Scout Movement
Preceded by Richard T. Lund	Secretary General; 1968–1985	Succeeded by Jacques Moreillon
