= Raphael Zengel =

American-born Canadian Victoria Cross recipient

Raphael Zengel VC MM
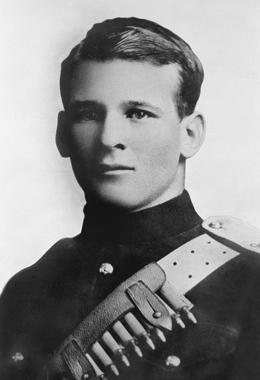
- Zengel in 1918
- Born: 11 November 1894; Faribault, Minnesota, United States
- Died: 27 February 1977 (aged 82); Errington, British Columbia, Canada
- Burial place: Pine Cemetery, Rocky Mountain House, Alberta
- Military career
- Allegiance: Canada
- Branch: Canadian Expeditionary Force
- Rank: Sergeant
- Units: 5th Battalion (Western Cavalry), CEF
- Conflicts: First World War
- Awards: Victoria Cross; Military Medal

Raphael Louis Zengel VC MM (11 November 1894 – 27 February 1977) was an American-born Canadian recipient of the Victoria Cross, the highest and most prestigious award for valour in the face of the enemy that can be awarded to British and Commonwealth forces.

== Early life ==
Zengel was born at Faribault, Minnesota. As a young boy, he and his mother Mary moved to a homestead near the village of Plunkett, Saskatchewan. He enlisted in the Canadian Expeditionary Force in July 1915.

== Victoria Cross ==
Zengel received the Military Medal in March 1918 for taking command of his platoon when his officer and sergeant had been put out of action. He was 23 years old, and a sergeant of the 5th (Western Cavalry) Battalion, Canadian Expeditionary Force, during the First World War, when on 9 August 1918 east of Warvillers, France, he performed the deed for which he was awarded the Victoria Cross.

The citation reads:

No. 424252 Sjt. Raphael Louis Zengel, M.M., Saskatchewan R.

For most conspicuous bravery and devotion to duty when protecting the battalion right flank. He was leading his platoon gallantly forward to the attack, but had not gone far when he realised that a gap had occurred on his flank, and that an enemy machine gun was firing at close range into the advancing line. Grasping the situation, he rushed forward some 200 yards ahead of the platoon, tackled the machine-gun emplacement, killed the officer and operator of the gun, and dispersed the crew. By his boldness and prompt action he undoubtedly saved the lives of many of his comrades. Later, when the battalion was held up by very heavy machine-gun fire, he displayed much tactical skill and directed his fire with destructive results. Shortly afterwards he was rendered unconscious for a few minutes by an enemy shell, but on recovering consciousness he at once continued to direct harassing fire on the enemy. Sjt. Zengel's work throughout the attack was excellent, and his utter disregard for personal safety, and the confidence he inspired in all ranks, greatly assisted in bringing the attack to a successful end.

— London Gazette, 27 September 1918.

== Retirement ==
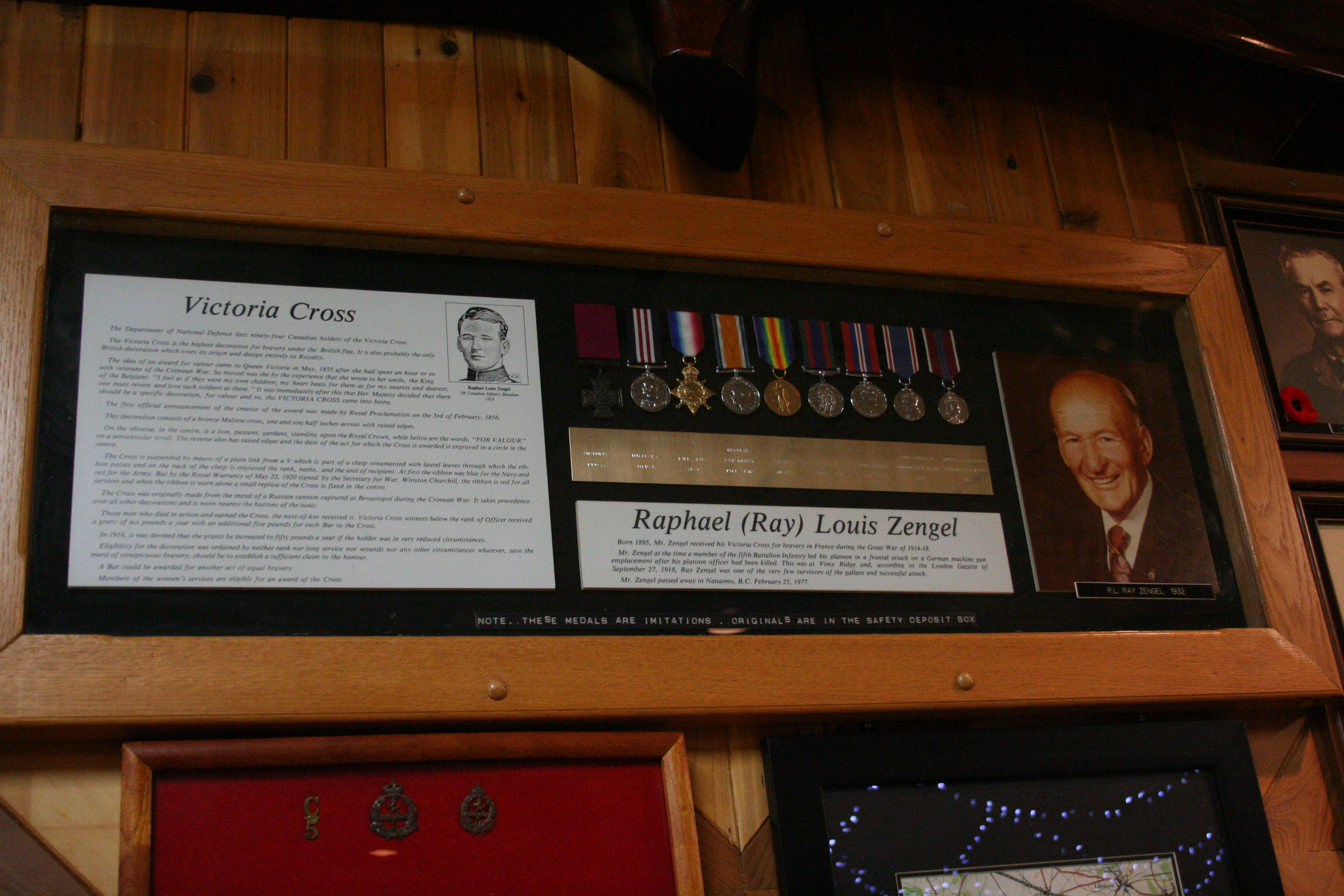
Replica of Raphael Zengel's Victoria Cross at the Rocky Mountain House branch of the Royal Canadian Legion.

After the war, Zengel lived in Calgary, Alberta, where he joined the Calgary Fire Department in 1919 and served until 1927.

Sergeant Zengel spent most of the rest of his life in the town Rocky Mountain House, Alberta, where the local branch of the Royal Canadian Legion has been named in his honour. He donated his Victoria Cross to the Rocky Mountain House Legion, where a replica of his Victoria Cross along with the rest of his medals are on display. His headstone can be found at Pine Grove Cemetery, Rocky Mountain House, Canada.

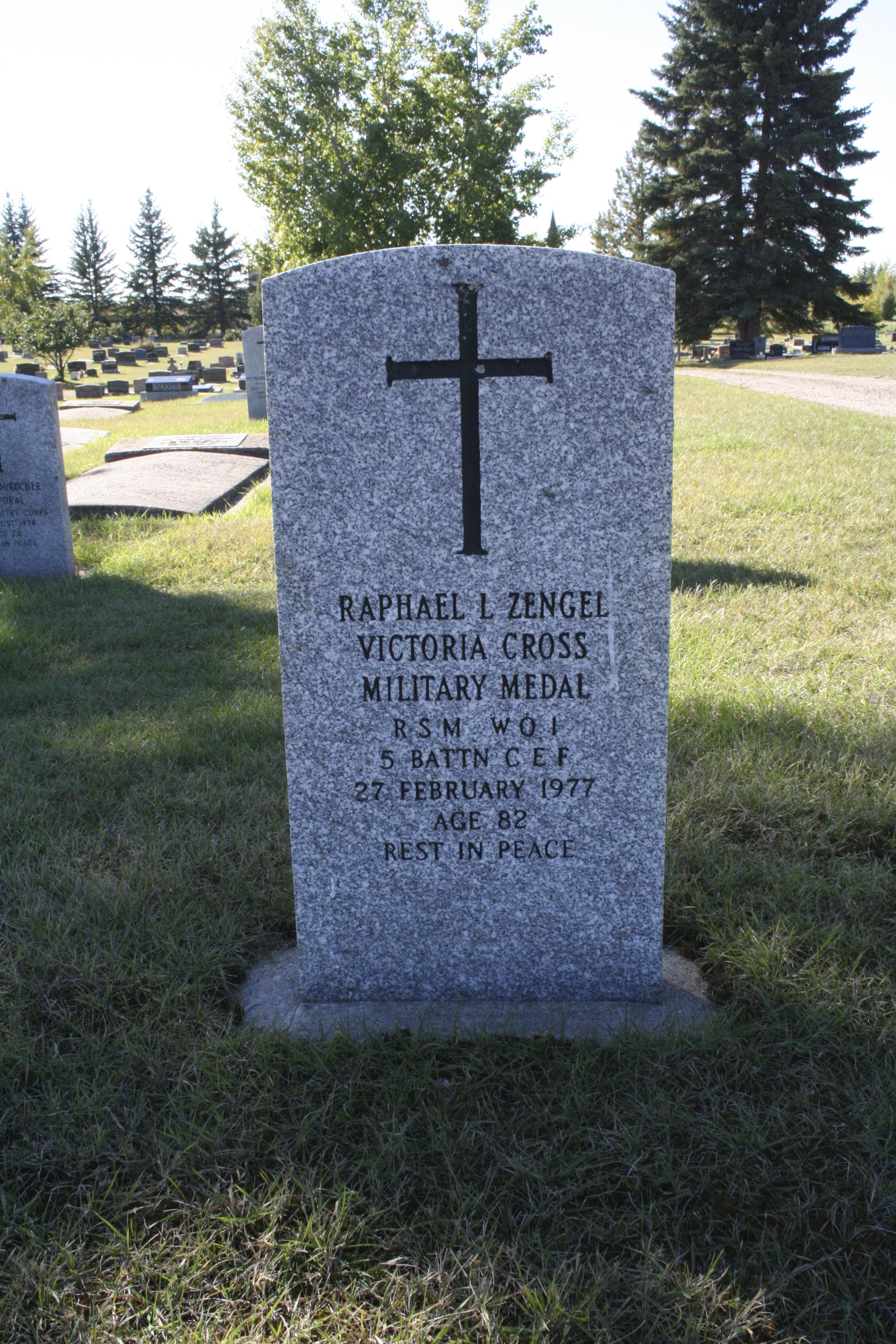
Raphael Zengel's Grave

== Legacy ==
In 1936, the government of Canada chose to name a lake in northeastern Saskatchewan in Zengel's honour. Inexplicably, the feature became Zengle Lake, and so it remains today (2007). In 1951, one of the mountains of the Victoria Cross Range, in Jasper National Park, was named in his honour. Mount Zengel is visible from Highway 16, east of Jasper, Alberta.
