= Richard T. Lund =

British scouting organisation leader

Secretary General of the Scout Movement
- In office 1965–1968
- Preceded by: Daniel Spry
- Succeeded by: László Nagy

Richard T. Lund of the United Kingdom served as the Secretary and was later appointed deputy director of the Boy Scouts International Bureau, and later succeeded Daniel Spry as the last Director of the World Scout Bureau. In 1968, the function of Director of the World Scout Bureau became Secretary General.

In 1953, Lund was awarded the 9th Bronze Wolf, the only distinction of the World Organization of the Scout Movement, awarded by the World Scout Committee for exceptional services to world Scouting, at the 14th World Scout Conference.

Some of his memoirs are kept at the Scout Museum in Manchester, New Hampshire.

World Organization of the Scout Movement
| Preceded by Daniel Spry | Secretary General; 1965–1968 | Succeeded by László Nagy |
