= Daniel Spry =

Canadian Army officer

Daniel Charles Spry
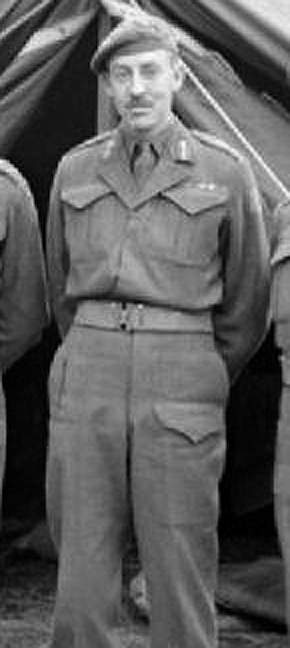
- Born: February 4, 1913; Winnipeg, Manitoba, Canada
- Died: April 2, 1989 (aged 76); Ottawa, Ontario, Canada
- Burial place: Beechwood Cemetery, Ottawa, Ontario, Canada
- Military career
- Allegiance: Canada
- Branch: Canadian Army
- Service years: 1932−1946
- Rank: Major General
- Unit: The Royal Canadian Regiment
- Commands: 1st Battalion, The Royal Canadian Regiment; 1st Canadian Infantry Brigade; 11th Canadian Infantry Brigade; 3rd Canadian Infantry Division
- Conflicts: Sicily; Italy; Normandy; Boulogne; Scheldt; Rhineland
- Awards: Commander of the Order of the British Empire; Distinguished Service Order; Canadian Forces' Decoration
- Other work: Chief Executive Commissioner of the Scout Movement in Canada

Major General Daniel Charles Spry CBE DSO CD (February 4, 1913 – April 2, 1989) was a senior Canadian Army officer who commanded the 3rd Canadian Infantry Division during Operation Veritable in World War II.

== Second World War ==
By 1943 and the fourth year of the Second World War, Spry had commanded the 1st Battalion, The Royal Canadian Regiment and then the 1st Canadian Infantry Brigade, both of which had fought in Sicily and, later, Italy. In 1944, now a brigadier, he commanded the 12th Canadian Infantry Brigade, part of the 5th Canadian Armoured Division, which was also serving in Italy.

Later, in August, he took charge of the 3rd Canadian Infantry Division, in Northwest Europe, commanding the division after Major General Rod Keller was wounded, leading it until the end of the Rhineland campaign in March 1945. The commander of the 3rd Division's parent formation, II Canadian Corps, Lieutenant General Guy Simonds, was dissatisfied with Spry's performance during the assaults on heavily defended woodland near Moyland, southeast of Kleve and later on the Hochwald, saying that he "lacked quick tactical appreciation and robust drive in ... urgent tactical situations". In turn, Spry felt that neither Simonds nor the latter's superior, General Harry Crerar, commanding the First Canadian Army, fully understood the situation "at the sharp end of battle". Simonds was adamant that Spry should go but Crerar was more sympathetic and he campaigned for Spry's appointment to the Canadian Reinforcement Units in Britain, appreciating Spry's ability as a trainer of soldiers (endorsed by Simonds) and the value of having a battle experienced officer in that role. Spry was relieved of command of the 3rd Division at the end of Operation Blockbuster and he duly left for Britain to command the Canadian Reinforcement Units.

== Postwar ==
In 1946, Spry became Vice-Chief of the General Staff at National Defence HQ in Ottawa and retired later that year.

In 1969, Spry presented the Major-General D. C. Spry Trophy, an annual small arms competition for The Royal Canadian Regiment.

== Scouting ==
Spry became Director of the Boy Scouts World Bureau and was awarded the Bronze Wolf, the only distinction of the World Organization of the Scout Movement, awarded by the World Scout Committee for exceptional services to world Scouting, in 1961. In 1956 he also received the highest distinction of the Scout Association of Japan, the Golden Pheasant Award.

World Organization of the Scout Movement
| Preceded by J. S. Wilson | Secretary General; 1951–1965 | Succeeded by Richard T. Lund |

Military offices
| Preceded by Rod Keller | GOC 3rd Canadian Infantry Division; 1944–1945 | Succeeded by Ralph Holley Keefler |
