= George Tuxford =

Welsh Canadian general (1870–1942)

Brigadier-General George Stuart Tuxford CB CMG DSO ED
- Born: 7 February 1870; Carnarvonshire, Wales
- Died: 30 January 1942 (aged 71); Tuxford, Saskatchewan
- Military career
- Allegiance: Canada
- Branch: Non-Permanent Active Militia; Canadian Expeditionary Force
- Service years: 1905–25
- Rank: Brigadier General
- Nickname: "Tux"
- Commands: 3rd Canadian Infantry Brigade; 5th Battalion (Western Cavalry), CEF; 27th Light Horse
- Conflicts: First World War: Western Front; Second Battle of Ypres; Battle of Vimy Ridge; Second Battle of Passchendaele; Battle of Amiens; Battle of the Canal du Nord
- Awards: Companion of the Order of the Bath; Companion of the Order of St Michael and St George; Distinguished Service Order; Canadian Efficiency Decoration
- Other work: Agriculture, oil speculation, business

Brigadier-General George Stuart Tuxford, CB, CMG, DSO, ED (7 February 1870 – 1942) was a pioneer of the Buffalo Pound Lake District, Saskatchewan, and later a senior officer in the Canadian Expeditionary Force (CEF). During the First World War he served first as officer commanding the 5th (Western Cavalry) Battalion and later as general officer commanding 3rd Canadian Infantry Brigade, 1st Canadian Division.

== Early life ==
Born at Penmorfa, Carnarvonshire, North Wales, on 7 February 1870 to a Lincolnshire couple, Tuxford grew up in the English countryside before immigrating to Canada in the 1880s.

Major G.S. Tuxford was appointed as the first commanding officer of the independent D Squadron, a sub-unit of the 16th Mounted Rifles, the later being first militia unit to be raised in Saskatchewan since the North-West Rebellion. Later promoted to lieutenant colonel, Tuxford became the first commanding officer of the newly formed 27th Light Horse with its regimental headquarters located in Moose Jaw. The current D Squadron served as the foundation for this unit. Its establishment was approved by Minister of Militia, Brigadier General Sam Hughes, and Commanding Officer Militia District 10, Colonel Sam Steele.

== First World War ==
At the outbreak of war, Lieutenant Colonel Tuxford attested for overseas service with the Canadian Expeditionary Force and was appointed to command the 5th (Western Cavalry) Battalion at Camp Valcartier. He took his unit overseas and led it during the Second Battle of Ypres in April 1915, as well at the Battle of Festubert. In March 1916 he was promoted brigadier general and succeeded Archibald Cameron Macdonell in command of the 3rd Canadian Infantry Brigade, which he led during the battles of Mount Sorrel, the Somme, Courcelette, Vimy Ridge, Hill 70, Amiens, Arras, and Cambrai.

Following the armistice in November 1918, his formation participated in the march to the Rhine and served as part of the occupation force in Germany until all Canadian units were returned home.
