= 3rd Canadian Infantry Brigade =

Infantry brigade of the Canadian Army

3rd Canadian Brigade 3rd Canadian Infantry Brigade
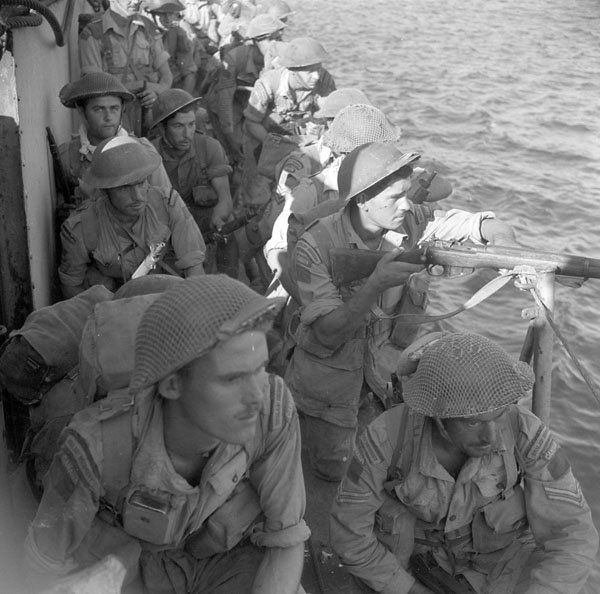
- Troops from the Royal 22^{e} Régiment getting ready to disembark, Italy, September 1943
- Active: 1914–1919; 1939–1945
- Country: Canada
- Branch: Canadian Army
- Type: Infantry
- Size: Brigade
- Part of: 1st Canadian Division
- Engagements: World War I: Second Battle of Ypres; Battle of the Somme; Battle of Vimy Ridge; Battle of Passchendaele; World War II: Invasion of Sicily; Italian campaign

Commanders
- Notable commanders: Richard Turner; George Tuxford

The 3rd Canadian Infantry Brigade was a formation of the Canadian Army in both World War I and World War II. The brigade fought on the Western Front during the First World War, and in Sicily and Italy during the Second World War.

== History ==
=== World War I ===
First formed on 29 August 1914, the brigade was initially made up from provisional battalions that were named after their province of origin, but these titles were replaced with numerals before the brigade arrived in Britain on 14 October 1914. On arrival in Britain, it consisted of four infantry battalions, numbered 13th, 14th, 15th, and 16th. As part of the 1st Canadian Division, the brigade fought in every major Canadian engagement on the Western Front between 1915 and 1918. Its first commander was Colonel Richard Turner. From March 1916 until the end of the war, the brigade was commanded by Brigadier-General George Tuxford.

After training on Salisbury Plain in late 1914, the brigade moved as part of the 1st Canadian Division to the Western Front. During its deployment on the Western Front, the 3rd Brigade fought in the following battles and engagements on the Western Front:

1915:

- Second Battle of Ypres
  - Battle of Gravenstafel: 22–23 April
  - Battle of St. Julien: 24 April – 4 May (see also Saint Julien Memorial)
- Battle of Festubert: 15–25 May
- Second Battle of Givenchy: 15–16 June

1916:

- Battle of Mount Sorrel: 2–13 June
- Battle of the Somme
  - Battle of Flers-Courcelette: 15–22 September
  - Battle of Thiepval: 26–28 September
  - Battle of Le Transloy: 1–18 October
  - Battle of the Ancre Heights: 1 October – 11 November

1917:

- Battle of Vimy Ridge: 9–14 April
- Battle of Arleux: 28–29 April
- Third Battle of the Scarpe: 3–4 May (including the capture of Fresnoy)
- Second Battle of Passchendaele: 26 October – 10 November

1918:

- Battle of Amiens: 8–11 August
- Actions round Damery: 15–17 August
- Battle of the Scarpe: 26–30 August
- Battle of Drocourt-Quéant: 2–3 September
- Battle of the Canal du Nord: 27 September – 1 October
- Battle of Cambrai: 8–9 October

=== World War II ===
During World War II the brigade, again as part of the 1st Canadian Division, participated in the Allied Invasion of Sicily and then later fought in the Italian campaign. It was demobilized for the second time at the end of the war.

== Order of battle ==
World War I

- 13th Battalion (Royal Highlanders of Canada), CEF (August 1914 – 11 November 1918)
- 14th Battalion (Royal Montreal Regiment), CEF (August 1914 – 11 November 1918)
- 15th Canadian Battalion (48th Highlanders of Canada), CEF (August 1914 – 11 November 1918)
- 16th Canadian Battalion (The Canadian Scottish), CEF (August 1914 – 11 November 1918)

World War II

- Headquarters, 3rd Infantry Brigade, C.A.S.F.
- 1st Battalion, Royal 22^{e} Régiment, C.A.S.F.
- 1st Battalion, The Carleton and York Regiment, C.A.S.F.
- 1st Battalion, The West Nova Scotia Regiment, C.A.S.F.
- 3rd Infantry Brigade Ground Defence Platoon (Lorne Scots), C.A.S.F. (Added 6 February 1941)
- 3rd Infantry Anti-Tank Company, C.A.S.F. (Deleted 5 February 1941)

== Brigade Commanders during the Second World War ==
- Brigadier C.B. Price: 17 October 1939 – 13 March 1941
- Brigadier H.N. Ganong: 14 March 1941 – 9 August 1942
- Brigadier C. Foulkes: 10 August 1942 – 3 April 1943
- (Position Vacant / under Acting Command): 4 – 7 April 1943
- Brigadier M.H.S. Penhale: 8 April – 11 October 1943
- Brigadier T.G. Gibson: 12 October 1943 – 12 April 1944
- Brigadier J.P.E. Bernatchez: 13 April 1944 – 2 June 1945
- (Position Vacant / under Acting Command): 3 June – 15 September 1945 (Disbanded)
