= 15th Battalion (48th Highlanders of Canada), CEF =

- Active: 1914–1920
- Country: Canada
- Branch: Canadian Expeditionary Force
- Role: Infantry
- Size: battalion
- Engagements: First World War

The 15th Battalion (48th Highlanders of Canada), CEF was an infantry battalion of the Canadian Expeditionary Force during World War I. The 15th Battalion was authorized on 1 September 1914, embarked for Britain on 26 September 1914, and arrived in France on 15 February 1915. The battalion fought as part of the 3rd Canadian Brigade, 1st Canadian Division in France and Flanders throughout the war. The battalion was disbanded on 30 August 1920.

== History ==
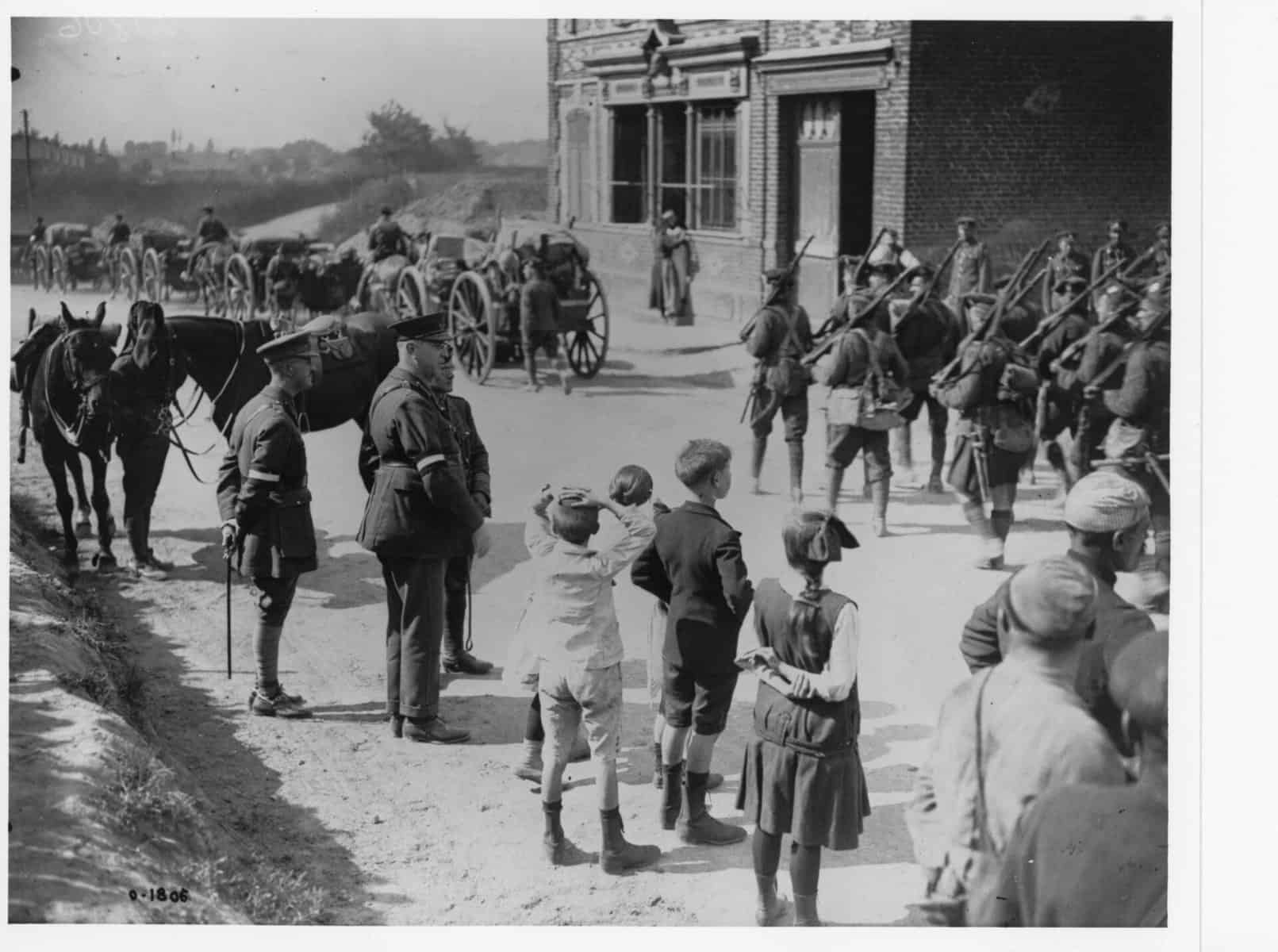
Gen. Sir Arthur Currie watching the 15th Battalion (48th Highlanders), CEF after it took Hill 70 in August 1917

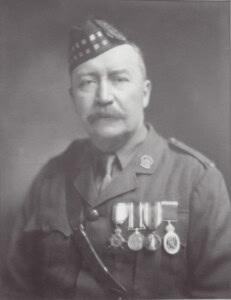
Lt.-Col. John A. Currie, first commanding officer of the 15th Battalion, CEF

The 15th Battalion recruited in Toronto, Sudbury, Owen Sound and St. Catharines, Ontario and Waterloo and Coaticook, Quebec and was mobilized at Camp Valcartier, Quebec.

The battalion fought on the southern flank of the 3rd Brigade during the attack on Vimy Ridge. They met little resistance from the Germans and reached their objectives within a few hours. The battalion suffered around 20% casualties with nine officers and over a hundred other ranks being killed or wounded.

Brock Chisholm served with this battalion during the war.

The 15th Battalion had seven officers commanding:

- Lt.-Col. A.J. Currie, 22 September 1914 – 28 June 1915
- Lt.-Col. W.B. Marshall, DSO, 28 June 1915 – 19 May 1916
- Lt.-Col. C.E. Bent, DSO, 20 May 1916 – 29 December 1917
- Lt.-Col. J.W. Forbes, DSO, 29 December 1917 – 15 April 1918
- Lt.-Col. C.E. Bent, CMG, DSO, 15 April 1918 – 10 August 1918
- Lt.-Col. J.P. Girvan, DSO, MC, 10 August 1918 – 3 October 1918
- Lt.-Col. C.E. Bent, CMG, DSO, 3 October 1918 – Demobilization

== Perpetuations ==
The 15th Battalion (48th Highlanders of Canada), CEF, is perpetuated by the 48th Highlanders of Canada.

== Battle honours ==
The 15th Battalion was awarded the following battle honours:

- YPRES, 1915, '17
- GRAVENSTAFEL
- St. Julien
- FESTUBERT, 1915
- MOUNT SORREL
- SOMME, 1916
- Pozières
- Thiepval
- Ancre Heights
- ARRAS, 1917, '18
- VIMY, 1917
- Arleux
- Scarpe, 1917, '18
- HILL 70
- Passchendaele
- AMIENS
- Drocourt-Quéant
- HINDENBURG LINE
- Canal du Nord
- PURSUIT TO MONS
- FRANCE AND FLANDERS, 1915–18

== See also ==
- List of infantry battalions in the Canadian Expeditionary Force

== Sources ==
- Canadian Expeditionary Force 1914–1919 by Col. G. W. L. Nicholson, CD, Queen's Printer, Ottawa, Ontario, 1962
