= 3rd Canadian Division =

Canadian Army formation

3rd Canadian Division; 3rd Canadian Infantry Division
- 3^{e} Division du Canada
- 3rd Canadian Division formation patch
- Active: 1915–1919; 24 May 1940 – 20 June 1946; 6 June 2014 – 10 September 2026
- Country: Canada
- Branch: Canadian Expeditionary Force; Canadian Army
- Type: Mechanized
- Nickname: Water Rats
- Engagements: First World War; Battle of the Somme; Battle of Vimy Ridge; Battle of Passchendaele; Second World War; D-Day, Juno Beach; Battle of Normandy; Battle of the Scheldt
- Website: canada.ca/en/army/corporate/3-canadian-division.html

Commanders
- Commanding officer: BGen L.W. Rutland
- Division sergeant-major: CWO Rob Clarke
- Notable commanders: Malcolm S. Mercer; Louis Lipsett; Frederick O.W. Loomis; Ernest W. Sansom; C.B. Price; Rodney F.L. Keller; Daniel C. Spry; Ralph H. Keefler

The 3rd Canadian Division was a formation of the Canadian Army. It was responsible for the command and mobilization of all army units in the provinces of Manitoba, Saskatchewan, Alberta and British Columbia, as well as Northwestern Ontario including the city of Thunder Bay.

It was first created as a formation of the Canadian Corps during the First World War. It was stood down following the war and was later reactivated as the 3rd Canadian Infantry Division during the Second World War. The second iteration served with distinction from 1941 to 1945, taking part in the D-Day landings of 6 June 1944. A duplicate of the 3rd Canadian Division was formed in 1945 to serve on occupation duty in Germany and was disbanded the following year.

== History ==
=== First World War ===
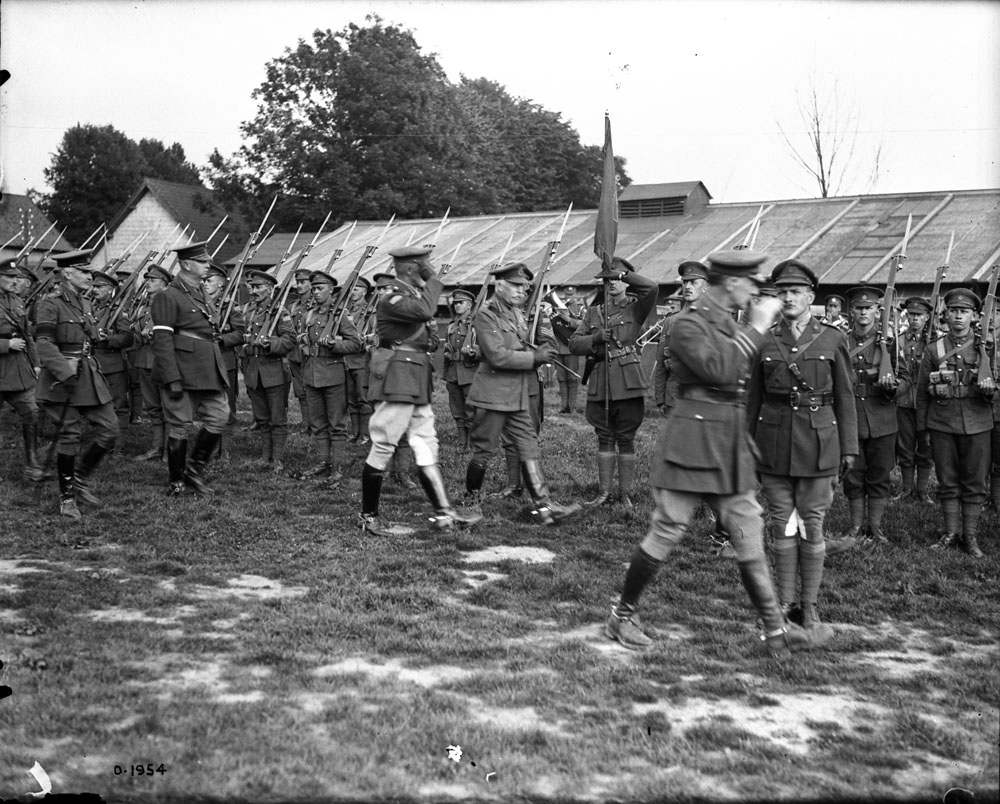
Prince Arthur, Duke of Connaught and Strathearn, inspecting the Princess Patricia's Canadian Light Infantry guard of honour, September 1917.

The 3rd Canadian Division was formed in France in December 1915 under the command of Major-General Malcolm Mercer. Its members served in France and Flanders until Armistice Day. While with the 3rd Division at Ypres, Mercer became the highest-ranking Canadian officer killed in action during the war. On the same day, Brigadier Victor Williams, commanding the 8th Infantry Brigade, became the highest-ranking Canadian officer captured in the war, also at the Battle of Mount Sorrel. Mercer was replaced by Louis Lipsett, who commanded the division until September 1918, shortly before he too was killed in action on 14 October 1918, while commander of British 4th Division. Major-General Frederick Loomis closed out the war as the commander.

=== Battles and engagements on the Western Front ===
Year	Battle/engagement	Date(s)
1916	Battle of Mount Sorrel	2–13 June
1916	Battle of Flers-Courcelette	15–22 September
1916	Battle of Morval	25 September
1916	Battle of Thiepval	26–28 September
1916	Battle of Le Transloy	1–18 October
1916	Battle of the Ancre Heights	1–11 October
1917	Battle of Vimy Ridge	9–14 April
1917	Attack on La Coulotte	23 April
1917	Third Battle of the Scarpe	3–4 May
1917	Affairs South of the Souchez River	3–25 June
1917	Capture of Avion	26–29 June
1917	Battle of Hill 70	15–25 August
1917	Second Battle of Passchendaele	26 October – 10 November
1918	Battle of Amiens	8–11 August
1918	Actions round Damery	15–17 August
1918	Battle of the Scarpe: (including the capture of Monchy-le-Preux)	26–30 August
1918	Battle of the Canal du Nord: (including the capture of Bourlon Wood)	27 September – 1 October
1918	Battle of Cambrai: (including the Capture of Cambrai)	8–9 October
1918	Battle of Valenciennes	1–2 November
1918	Pursuit to Mons	11 November

=== Second World War ===
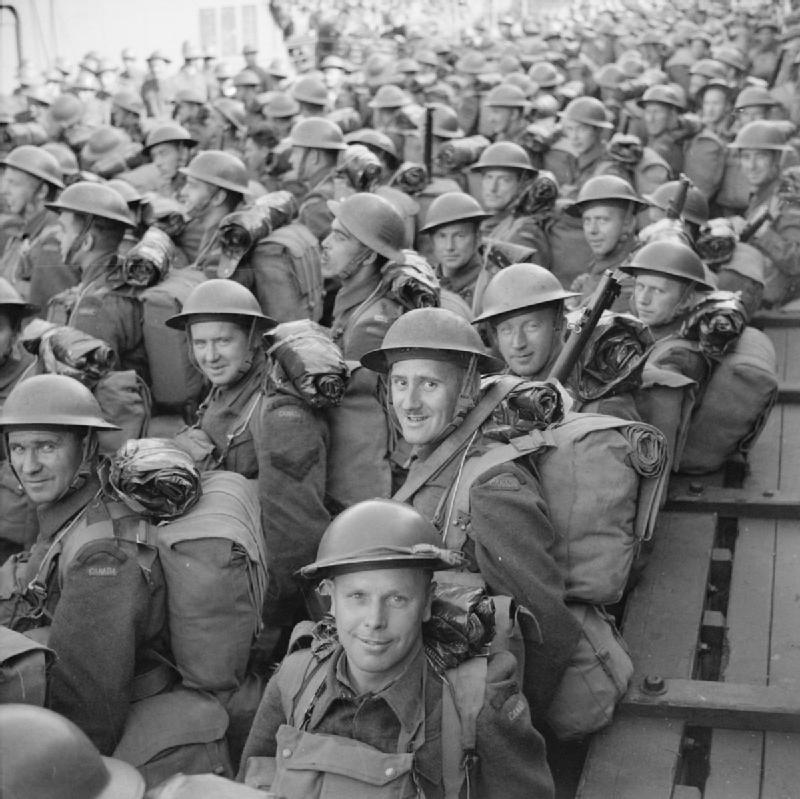
Men of the 3rd Canadian Division are carried ashore on a tender, having disembarked from a troopship at Gourock in Scotland, 30 July 1941.

The formation of the 3rd Canadian Infantry Division was authorized during the Second World War on 24 May 1940 (General Order 184/40). There was a lengthy delay in the formation of the division due to unpopularity within the Federal government of forming a third division to be sent overseas. Which would increase the likelihood of enacting conscription if the now enlarged overseas forces suffered any heavy casualties with any enactment of conscription being grounds for another Conscription crisis. However due to the grave situation posed during the time frame of the Battle of Britain. The total formation of the 3rd Canadian Infantry Division would be ordered with the divisional and brigade (7th, 8th, and 9th) headquarters being formed 5 September 1940. However there was still push back and delays as seen with the division only receiving its first GOC on 26 October 1940.

While the division's components were forming, The Cameron Highlanders of Ottawa was detached and transferred to Iceland as part of Z Force. The battalion spent the winter of 1940–41 there, then moved to the United Kingdom. The division's 8th and 9th Canadian Infantry Brigades began embarking as early as 1 July 1941 and arrived in the United Kingdom at the end of that month. The 7th Canadian Infantry Brigade embarked in August and arrived at the beginning of September.

After its arrival, the division spent three uneventful years in garrison and training duties prior to the assault landing on Juno Beach on D-Day, 6 June 1944, as part of the British Second Army, later joining the newly formed First Canadian Army.

Battle honours include Caen, Falaise, clearing the Channel ports, the Breskens pocket, and the final offensives of 1945. During the Battle of the Scheldt, the 3rd Canadian Infantry Division had the nickname of "Water Rats" bestowed upon them by Field Marshal Sir Bernard Montgomery, commanding 21st Army Group, in recognition of the poor conditions of terrain through which they fought, first in the Normandy landings, and then in the flooded Breskens Pocket.

==== Juno Beach, D Day ====
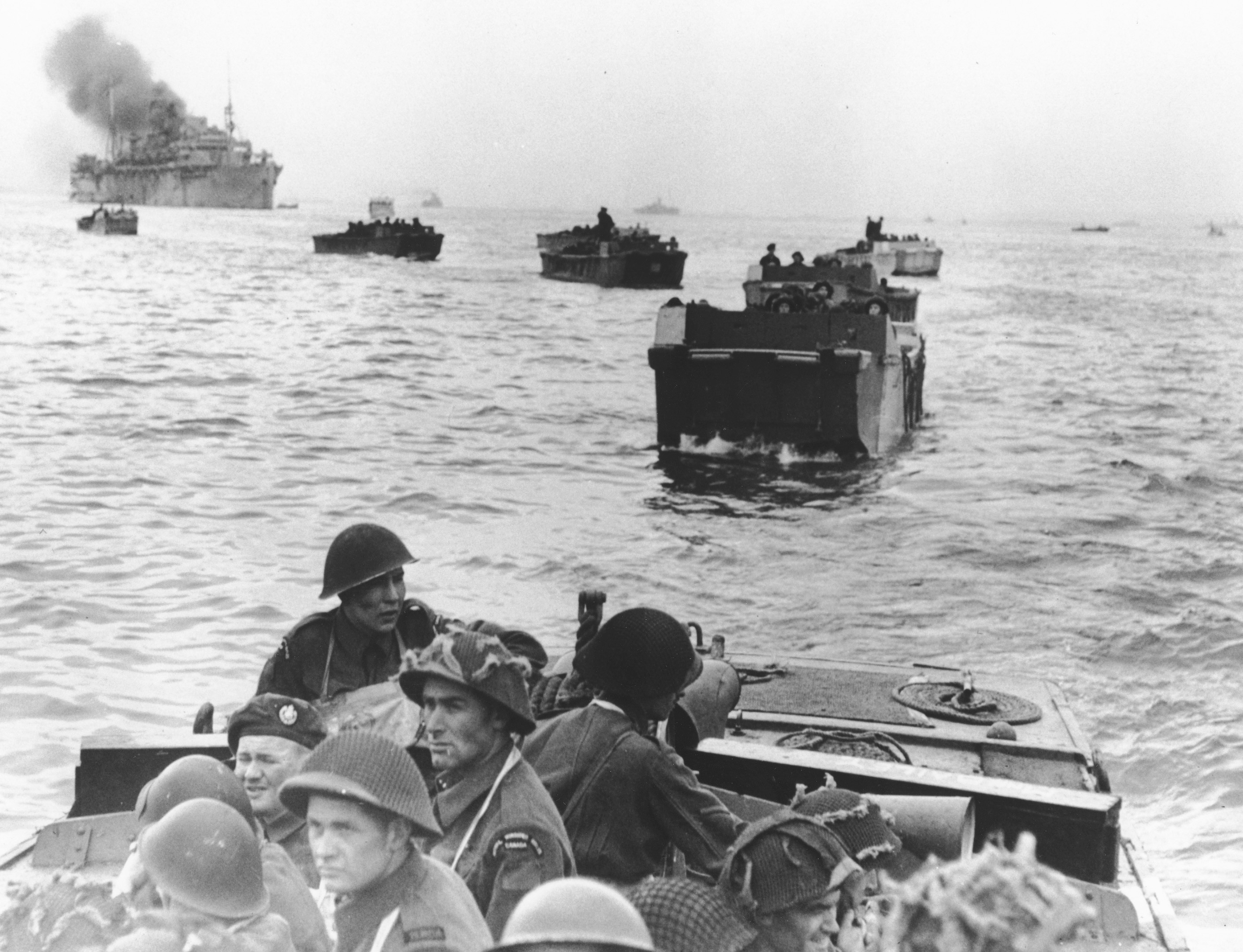
Canadian soldiers headed for Juno Beach aboard LCAs

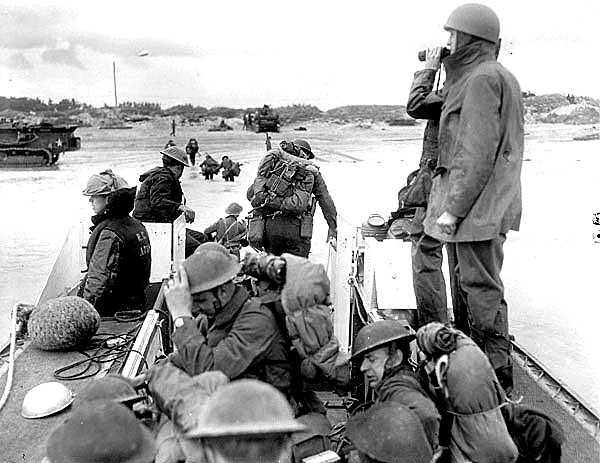
Canadian reinforcements landing on Juno beach from an LCA

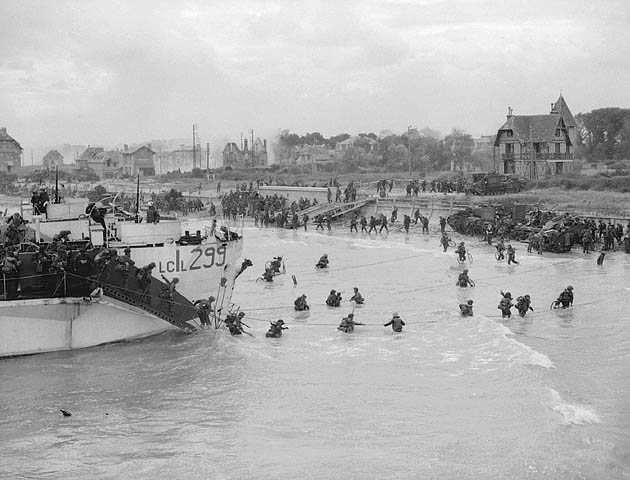
9th Canadian Infantry Brigade personnel land at 'Nan White' Beach at Bernières-sur-Mer

Tanks and Régiment de la Chaudière infantry moving along French village road, Normandy beachhead

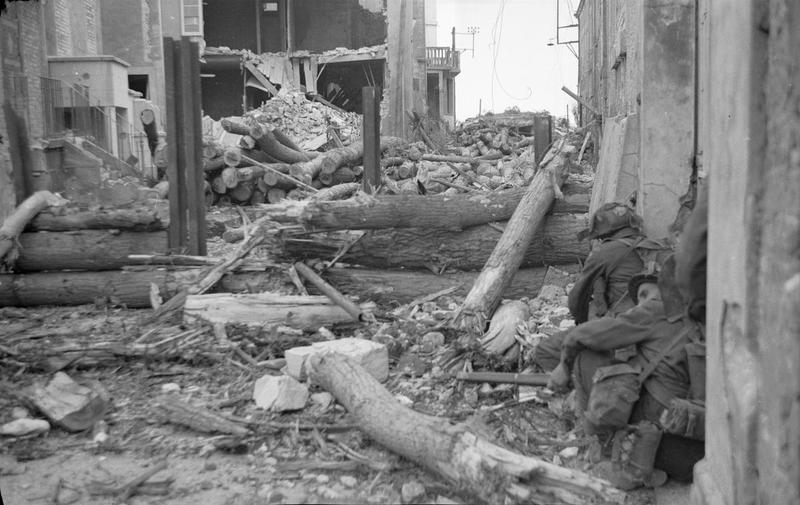
Canadian troops of 'B' Company, North Shore (New Brunswick) Regiment, take cover behind steel girders and logs guarding the approach to the German strongpoint WN-27 in Saint-Aubin-sur-Mer, 6 June 1944.

Juno Beach was 5 miles (8.0 km) wide and stretched on either side of Courseulles-sur-Mer. It lay between Sword and Gold beaches which were the responsibility of British Army forces.

The 3rd Canadian Infantry Division, with the 2nd Canadian Armoured Brigade under command, landed in two brigade groups, the 7th Canadian Infantry Brigade and the 8th Canadian Infantry Brigade. Each brigade had three infantry battalions and an armoured regiment in support, two artillery field regiments, combat engineer companies and specialist units of the British 79th Armoured Division. The 10th Armoured Regiment (The Fort Garry Horse) tanks supported the 7th Brigade landing on the left and the 6th Armoured Regiment (1st Hussars) tanks supported the landing on the right. The division had been assigned extra artillery and anti-tank units (Note: the British 62nd (6th London) Anti-Tank Regiment, Royal Artillery with two batteries of M10 self-propelled and two of towed 17 pounder guns) doubling its artillery component.

The 9th Canadian Infantry Brigade was kept in reserve and landed later that day and advanced through the lead brigades. The 27th Armoured Regiment (The Sherbrooke Fusiliers Regiment) provided tank support.

The initial assault was carried out by:

- North Shore Regiment on the left at St. Aubin (Nan Red beach)
- Queen's Own Rifles in the centre at Bernières (Nan White beach)
- Regina Rifles at Courseulles (Nan Green beach)
- Royal Winnipeg Rifles on the western edge of Courseulles (Mike Red and Mike Green beaches)

Canadian air, land and sea forces suffered approximately 950 casualties on D-Day, the majority being soldiers of the 3rd Canadian Division, of 21,400 troops landed on Juno beach that day.

By noon, the entire division was ashore and leading elements had pushed several kilometres inland to seize bridges over the Seulles. By 6:00 pm, they had captured the town of Saint-Aubin-sur-Mer. A 1st Hussars armoured troop reached its objective along with men of The Queen's Own Rifles of Canada before nightfall, when both units moved 15 km inland and crossed the Caen-Bayeux highway. However, this troop was forced to pull back because they had passed the supporting infantry. By the end of D-Day, the division had penetrated farther into France than any other Allied force, though counter-attacks by elements of two German armoured divisions prevented further major gains for four weeks.

None of the assault divisions, including 3rd Canadian Division, had managed to secure their D-Day objectives, which lay inland, although the Canadians came closer than any other Allied formation. Indeed, The Queen's Own Rifles of the 8th Brigade were the only Allied battalion to capture their D-Day objective.

By the end of the next day, the Canadian forces had linked up with the British forces that had landed at Sword Beach.

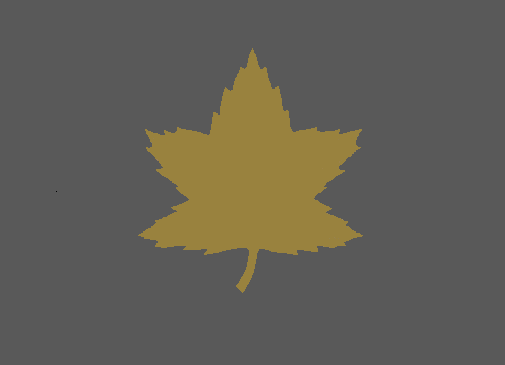
Formation sign used to identify vehicles of the 3rd Canadian Infantry Division

===== Time line Juno Beach =====
- 6 June 1944
  - 05:35 German shore batteries open fire; Allied naval forces, now massed along entire Normandy coast, begin bombardment.
  - 06:30 Assault on beaches starts. 3rd Canadian Division landing on Juno made more difficult by strong current. Delay allows Germans to mount strong defence. Objective: advance inland and join troops from British beaches.
  - 07:00 German radio broadcasts first report of landing.
  - 08:30 48 Commando lands at St Aubin, Juno Beach and heads east. Beach clearance difficult due to high tides and rough seas.
  - 09:00 General Eisenhower issues communiqué announcing start of invasion.
  - 09:35 Canadian 8th Brigade liberates Bernières.
  - 11:12 After fierce fire fight, 7th Brigade secures Juno exit at Courseulles. But congestion as Canadian 9th Brigade arrives.
  - 11:20 Canadians capture Tailleville, Banville and St Croix.
  - 12:00 As Winston Churchill reports landings to House of Commons, Further landings on Juno. Langrune captured by Juno troops.
  - 13:35 German 352nd Division wrongly advises HQ that Allied assault repulsed. Message not corrected until 18.00.
  - 14:15 All Canadian 3rd Division now ashore on Juno. Rapid advances start: troops link with those from Gold.
  - 18:00 3rd Canadian Div, North Nova Scotia Highlanders reach 3 miles (4.8 km) inland. 1st Hussar tanks cross Caen-Bayeux railway, 10 miles (16 km) inland. Canadian Scottish link with 50th Division at Creully.
  - 20:00 Canadians from Juno Beach reach Villons les Buissons, 7 miles (11 km) inland. Attack by 21st Panzers reach coast between Sword and Juno at Luc-sur-Mer.
  - 22:00 Rommel returns to HQ from Germany. Montgomery sails for France.

Juno Beach: 21,400 troops landed, with fewer than 1,000 casualties. Aim of capturing Carpiquet airfield not achieved. No link yet with Sword forces.

==== Fighting in Normandy ====
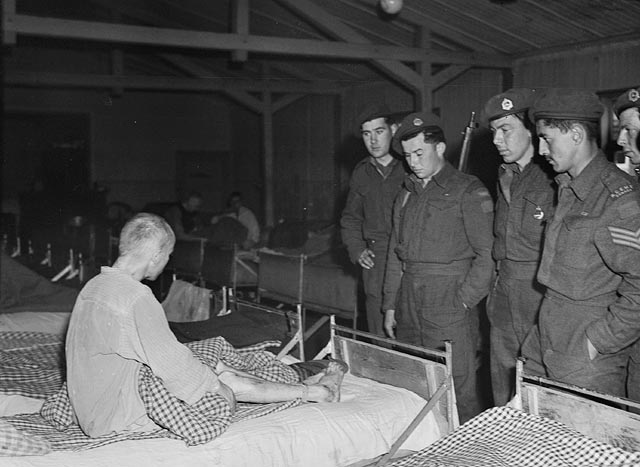
Members of the 3rd Infantry Division with a starving prisoner liberated from a Nazi concentration camp in 1945.

The 3rd Canadian Infantry Division fought in the Battle of Normandy in I British Corps and later in the II Canadian Corps. On D-Day+1, units of the division became the only among the Allies to secure any of their D-Day objectives. The villages of Authie and Carpiquet both saw determined fighting between the Canadians and German defenders of the 12th SS Panzer Division. Over five days, the 12th SS counter-attacked to crush the Canadian bridgehead and throw them back into the sea. The attacks cost the 12th a third of their armoured strength and they were forced to retire in the face of stubborn resistance, Allied naval gunfire and air superiority. On 4 July 1944, the 3rd Canadian Division, along with the British 3rd Infantry Division and 59th (Staffordshire) Infantry Division, supported by elements of the 79th Armoured Division, launched Operation Windsor, capturing the Carpiquet Airfield and the vicinity from the 12th SS after several hours of confused and hard fighting. On 8 July, the 3rd Canadian Division participated in Operation Charnwood, the final advance on the northern parts of Caen by the Second Army.

On 18 July, Operation Atlantic began, the Canadian advance that would coincide with Operation Goodwood, further east by the British in the area south of Caen. The 2nd Canadian Division and the 3rd Canadian Division, supported by tanks, advanced towards Caen, one of the objectives being the village of Colombelles and the surrounding hills. This village and the surrounding area was defended by the experienced 21st Panzer Division. After several hours of confused fighting on the 18 July and 19 July, the Germans were forced back from the outskirts of the town and over the river Orne. The 3rd Canadian Division continued the advance on 20 July and the lead units came under massed machine-gun and small arms fire from a chateau close to Colombelles. The Queen's Own Rifles of Canada, with support from the tanks of the 17th Duke of York's Royal Canadian Hussars, pushed forward once again despite many casualties and captured the fortified village of Giberville. The rest of the 3rd Canadian Division captured Colombelles during the day. The Canadians were then faced with the formidable German defensive positions on the Verrières Ridge, where the SS had created excellent field fortifications, deployed hundreds of field artillery pieces, including Nebelwerfers, and dug numerous trenches and foxholes for defence. The 2nd Canadian Division attacked the ridge with the 4th Canadian Brigade and the 6th Canadian Brigade but suffered many losses and were repulsed. The attack began in heavy rain, which turned the ground to mud and bogged down the Canadian armoured support and kept the Typhoon fighter-bombers grounded. After the failure, troops from the 2nd SS Panzer Division and the 12th SS Panzer Division counter-attacked; it was only with support from the 8th Canadian Brigade, 3rd Canadian Division that they managed to beat the Germans back.

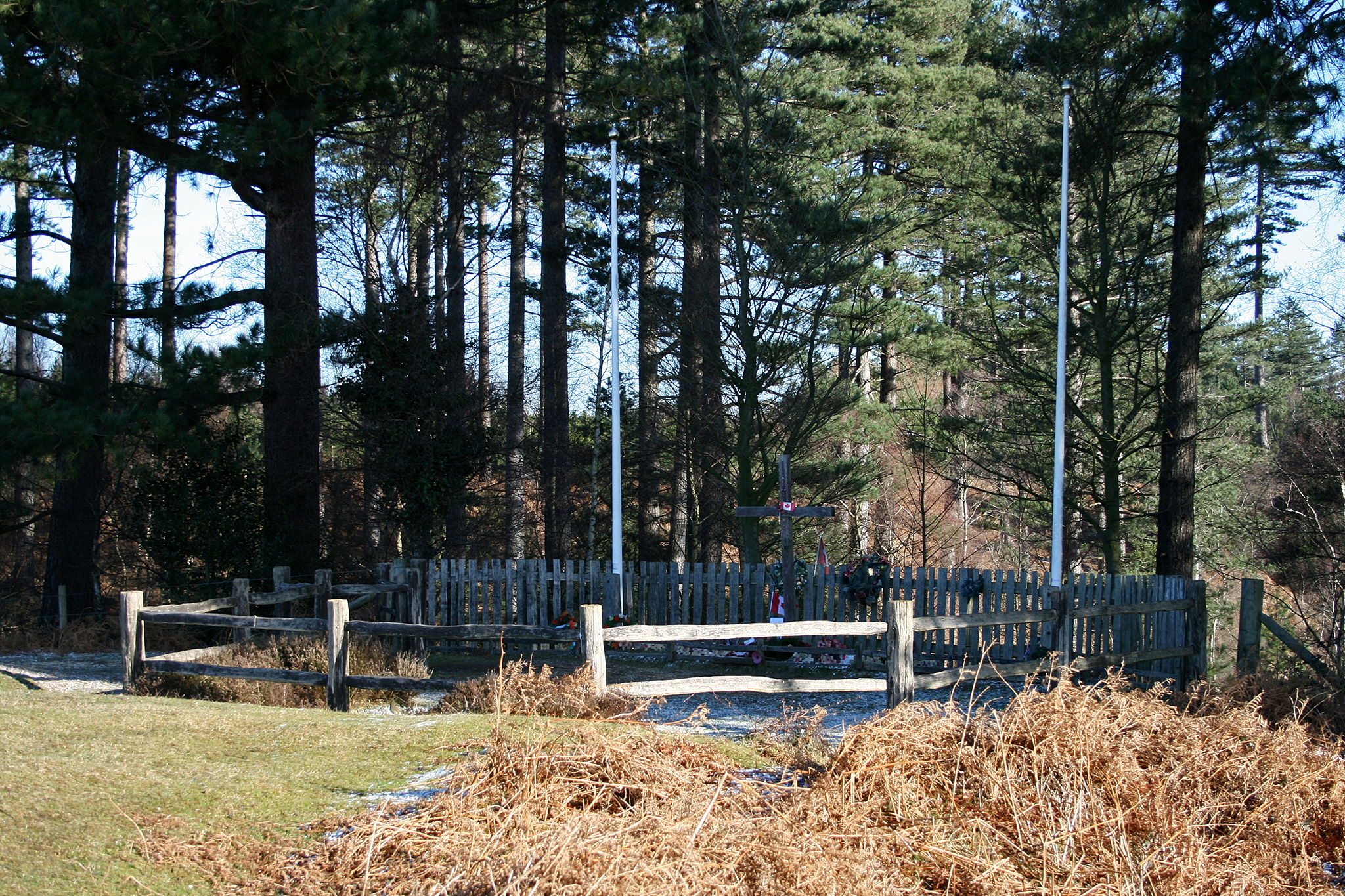
The original cross erected for religious services in the New Forest, southern England, by men of the 3rd Canadian Division. It is now maintained as a war memorial by local people and the UK Forestry Commission. The bronze plate at the foot of the cross is inscribed "On this site a cross was erected to the glory of God on 14th April 1944. Services were held here until D-Day by men of the 3rd Canadian Division RCASC."

The British 3rd Infantry Division faced considerable resistance and made a costly advance. Tiger tanks from the schwere Panzerabteilung 503 (503rd Heavy Tank Detachment) caused many losses to the British armour support. The 7th Armoured Division, 11th Armoured Division and Guards Armoured Division faced opposition from the 1st SS Panzer Division and 12th SS Panzer Division and suffered tank losses. The offensive continued for two more days before the Allied offensive was stopped in face of stiffening German resistance. The German Panzer divisions in the area had been bled dry, losing many tanks and men, that could not easily be replaced. Two days later, on 25 July, the First US Army launched Operation Cobra.

Nearly all of the panzer units in Normandy had been sent to stop the British–Canadian advance. The 3rd Canadian Division and the other units involved in the offensive were allowed to catch their breath and they dug in, expecting a German counter-attack that never came. On 5 September, the 3rd Canadian Division overran the Fortress of Mimoyecques, revealing the infrastructure for the unknown V-3 cannon destroyed by Tallboy bombs in July. Between 17 and 22 September 1944, the 3rd Canadian Division was involved in the liberation of Boulogne-sur-Mer, during which a French civilian guided the Canadians to a "secret passage" leading into the walled old town and by-passing the German defenders. By 1 October 1944, the Division had also liberated Calais.

=== List of general officers commanding the division: Second World War ===
General officer commanding	Date(s)
(No division HQ)	24 May – 4 September 1940
(Position vacant)	5 September – 25 October 1940
Major-General E.W. Sansom	26 October 1940 – 13 March 1941
Major-General C.B. Price	14 March 1941 – 7 September 1942
Major-General R.F.L. Keller	8 September 1942 – 8th August 1944 (wounded in action)
Brigadier K.G. Blackader	9–17 August 1944 (acting general officer commanding)
Major-General D.C. Spry	18 August 1944 – 22 March 1945
Major-General R.H. Keefler	23 March − 19 November 1945
(Position vacant)	20–23 November 1945 (division disbanded)

=== Duplicate division (Canadian Army Occupation Force) 1945–1946 ===
In 1945, the 3rd Canadian Division, Canadian Army Occupation Force (CAOF) was created, based on the organization of the 3rd Infantry Division. The component units of the new division were named after the units of the existing 3rd Infantry Division. The formation was formed on the organizational structure of a standard infantry division and supplied units as part of Canada's commitment to postwar European reconstruction. The occupation force served in Germany until relieved by the 52nd (Lowland) Infantry Division of the British Army on 15 May 1946. Authorization for units to disband came under General Order 162/46 and 201/46, and headquarters was disbanded by General Order 283/46, effective 20 June 1946.

=== Recent history (1990–present) ===
In the early 1990s Land Force Western Area (LFWA) was established as one of four area commands of the Canadian Army. LFWA was responsible for all Regular and Reserve Army formations in Manitoba, Saskatchewan, Alberta and British Columbia. The line formations of LFWA included 1 Canadian Mechanized Brigade Group, 38 Canadian Brigade Group, 39 Canadian Brigade Group, and 41 Canadian Brigade Group.

In addition to the brigades, LFWA was also composed of 1 Area Support Group and its bases, 4th Canadian Ranger Patrol Group of the Canadian Rangers, and the Western Area Training Centre. LFWA contributed extensively to domestic operations at home, and on missions abroad in locales such as the Balkans and Afghanistan for over two decades.

On 6 June 2014, on the 70th anniversary of the 3rd Canadian Infantry Division's D-Day landing in Normandy, LFWA became 3rd Canadian Division. On the same day, 3 Cdn Div was permanently bestowed the French Grey designation patch.

=== Stand Down (2026) ===
On September 10, 2026, as part of an organizational change switching from geographic-based divisions to purpose-driven, 3rd Division was stood down. The division headquarters was reorganized as the headquarters of the new 1st Canadian Division, while most of the division’s subordinate formations were transferred to other divisions. 3rd Division was moved to the Supplementary Order of Battle, retaining its history, lineage, colours, traditions and battle honours.

== Structure ==
=== Historical ===
==== World War I ====
7th Infantry Brigade:

- The Royal Canadian Regiment. December 1915 – 11 November 1918;
- Princess Patricia's Canadian Light Infantry. 24 December 1915 – 11 November 1918;
- 42nd (Royal Highlanders) Battalion Canadian Infantry. December 1915 – 11 November 1918;
- 49th (Edmonton) Battalion Canadian Infantry. December 1915 – 11 November 1918.

8th Infantry Brigade:

- 1st Battalion, Canadian Mounted Rifles, CEF. December 1915 – 11 November 1918;
- 2nd Battalion, Canadian Mounted Rifles, CEF. December 1915 – 11 November 1918;
- 4th Battalion, Canadian Mounted Rifles, CEF. December 1915 – 11 November 1918;
- 5th Battalion, Canadian Mounted Rifles, CEF. December 1915 – 11 November 1918.

9th Infantry Brigade: (Joined the Division in January 1916)

- 43rd (Cameron Highlanders) Battalion Canadian Infantry. January 1916 – 11 November 1918;
- 52nd (North Ontario) Battalion Canadian Infantry. January 1916 – 11 November 1918;
- 58th (Central Ontario) Battalion Canadian Infantry. January 1916 – 11 November 1918;
- 60th (Victoria Rifles) Battalion Canadian Infantry. January 1916 – 30 April 1917. (Disbanded)
- 116th (Ontario County Infantry) Battalion Canadian Infantry. April 1917 – 11 November 1918.

Pioneers:

- 3rd Canadian Pioneer Battalion. 8 January 1916 – May 1917 (Disbanded);
- 123rd Canadian Pioneer Battalion. March 1917 – June 1918. To the 3rd Canadian Engineer Brigade.

==== World War II ====
- 7th Canadian Infantry Brigade
  - 1st Battalion, The Royal Winnipeg Rifles
  - 1st Battalion, The Regina Rifle Regiment
  - 1st Battalion, The Canadian Scottish Regiment (Princess Mary's)
  - 7th Infantry Brigade Ground Defence Platoon (Lorne Scots)
- 8th Canadian Infantry Brigade
  - 1st Battalion, The Queen's Own Rifles of Canada
  - 1st Battalion, Le Régiment de la Chaudière
  - 1st Battalion, The North Shore (New Brunswick) Regiment
  - 8th Infantry Brigade Ground Defence Platoon (Lorne Scots)
- 9th Canadian Infantry Brigade
  - 1st Battalion, The Highland Light Infantry of Canada
  - 1st Battalion, The Stormont, Dundas and Glengarry Highlanders
  - 1st Battalion, The North Nova Scotia Highlanders
  - 9th Infantry Brigade Ground Defence Platoon (Lorne Scots)
- Divisional Troops
  - 7th Reconnaissance Regiment (17th Duke of York's Royal Canadian Hussars)
  - 1st Battalion, The Cameron Highlanders of Ottawa (Machine Gun)
  - 3rd Canadian Divisional Signals, R.C. Sigs
  - No. 3 Defence and Employment Platoon (Lorne Scots)
  - No. 4 Canadian Provost Company, Canadian Provost Corps
  - No. 14, No. 22, No. 23 Field Ambulance, Royal Canadian Army Medical Corps
- Divisional Royal Canadian Artillery
  - 12th Field Artillery Regiment, RCA
  - 13th Field Artillery Regiment, RCA
  - 14th Field Artillery Regiment, RCA
  - 3rd Anti-Tank Regiment, RCA
  - 4th Light Anti-Aircraft Regiment, RCA
- Divisional Royal Canadian Engineers
  - 6th Field Company, RCE
  - 16th Field Company, RCE
  - 18th Field Company, RCE
  - 3rd Canadian Field Park Company, RCE
  - 3rd Canadian Divisional Bridge Platoon, RCE

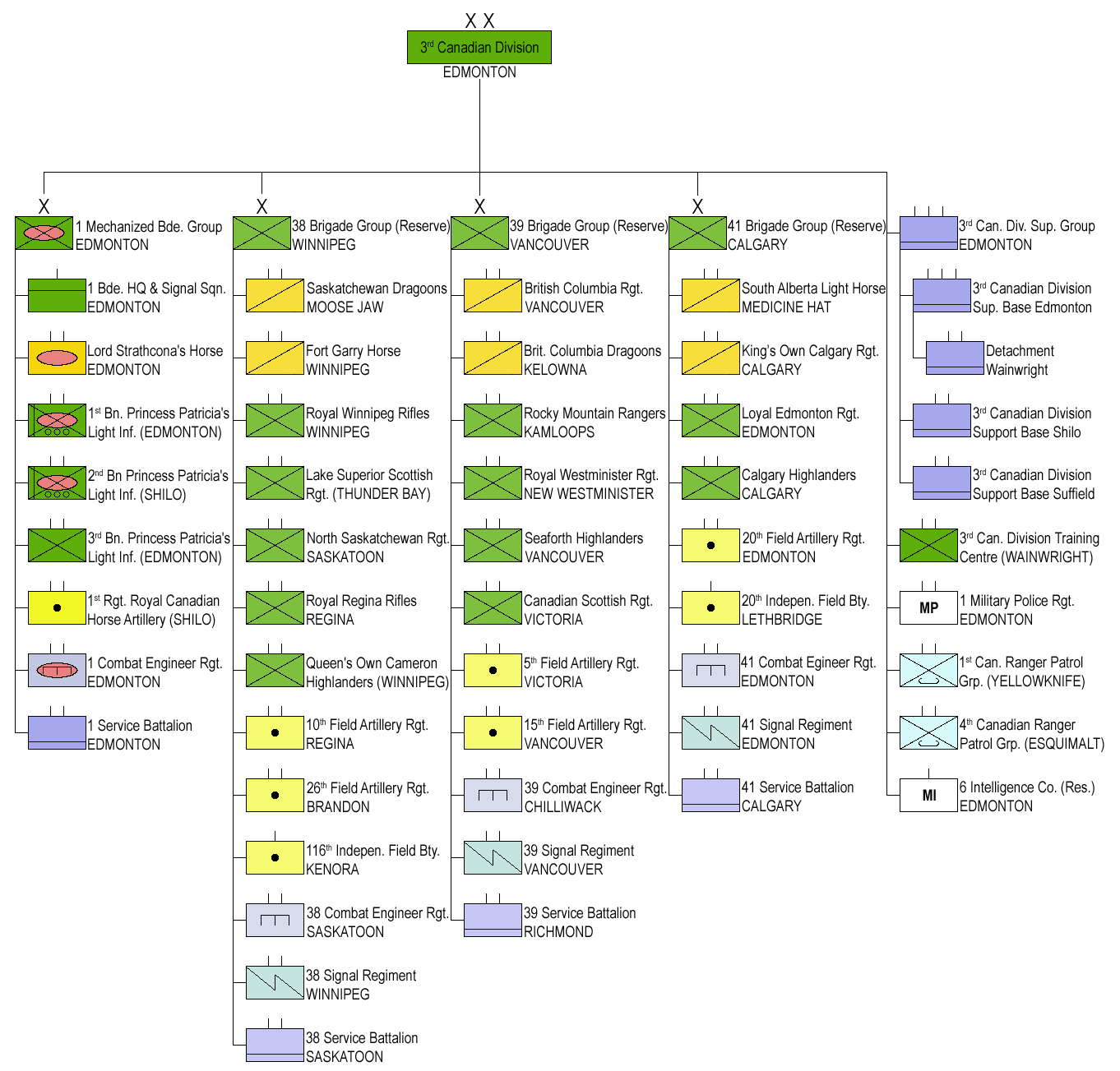
3rd Canadian Division organization in 2020

=== Post Cold War ===
The division was headquartered at CFB Edmonton and covered Western Canada.

- 3rd Canadian Division, at CFB Edmonton
  - 1 Canadian Mechanized Brigade Group, at CFB Edmonton, CFB Shilo
  - 38 Canadian Brigade Group, in Winnipeg (covering Saskatchewan, Manitoba, and Northwestern Ontario)
  - 39 Canadian Brigade Group, in Vancouver (covering British Columbia)
  - 41 Canadian Brigade Group, in Calgary (covering Alberta)
  - 3rd Canadian Division Support Group, at CFB Edmonton
  - 1 Military Police Regiment, at CFB Edmonton
  - 6 Intelligence Company (Reserve), in Edmonton
  - 1st Canadian Ranger Patrol Group, at CFNA HQ Yellowknife (patrolling Northwest Territories, Yukon, and Nunavut)
  - 4th Canadian Ranger Patrol Group, at CFB Esquimalt (patrolling British Columbia, Alberta, Saskatchewan, and Manitoba)
  - 3rd Canadian Division Training Centre, at CFB Wainwright, CFB Shilo, CFB Edmonton

== Insignia ==
In August 1916, individual battalions of the Canadian Corps were ordered to wear a distinguishing patch to better provide command and control in battle. Battalions were represented by a series of coloured geometric patches that corresponded to their seniority within the brigades of the overseas divisions of the corps. These shapes were sewn over top of a rectangle 3 inches (7.6 cm) wide by 2 inches (5.1 cm) tall which was also colour coded by division, and worn on the upper rear of each soldier's uniform jacket and greatcoat, just below the collar. The location was quickly moved from the collar to the sleeve. The 3rd Division was originally ordered to wear white patches, followed ten days later by an order changing the colour to black and the location. In May 1917, the commander of the 3rd Division published a routine order stating that, because the black patches were too difficult to see, French grey was to be worn instead.

The patch was revived in 1941. The 3rd Canadian Division, CAOF, wore a French-grey patch with a 1/2-inch-wide (1.3 cm) French-grey bar added horizontally underneath the division patch to distinguish it from the war service 3rd Division.

In 2014, the revived 3rd Canadian Division adopted a French-grey formation patch. After much debate, Pantone Grey 535C was adopted. The Pantone colour is actually "Blue Range" and was arrived at by comparison to artifacts in various historical exhibits. The colour was approved by the Directorate of History and Heritage, a sub-group of the Department of National Defence.

== See also ==
- List of military divisions
- List of Canadian divisions in World War II
