= Rod Keller =

Canadian general (1900–1954)

Rodney Frederick Leopold Keller
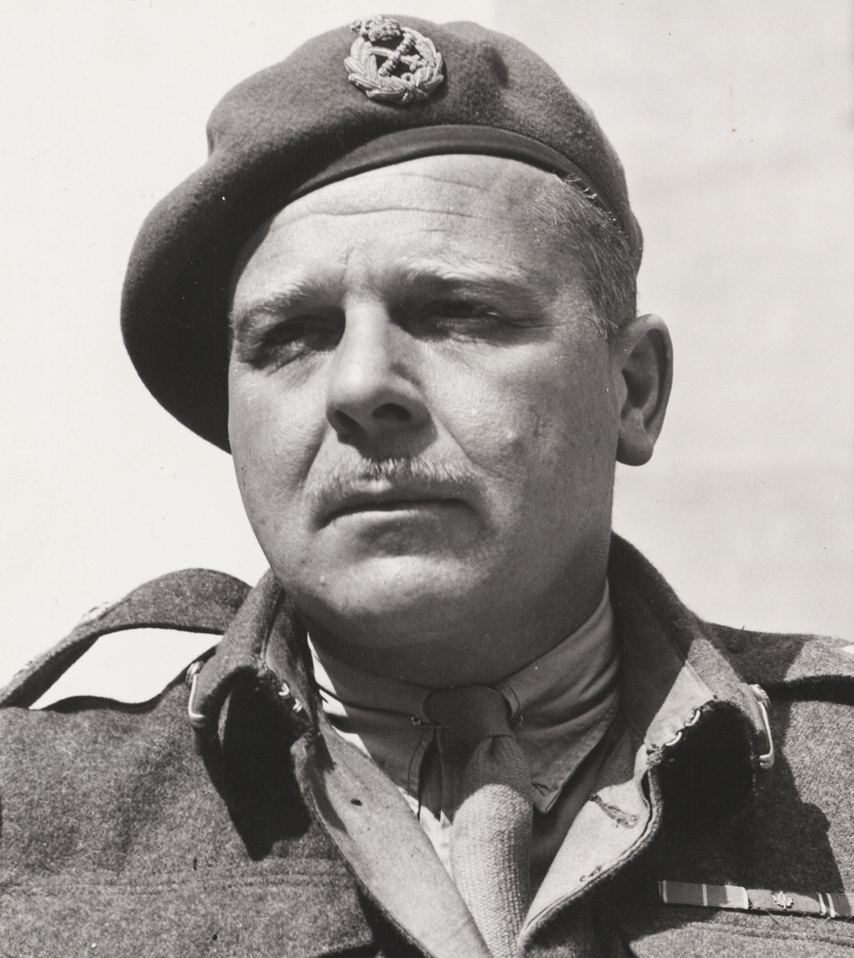
- Born: 2 October 1900; Tetbury, Gloucestershire, England
- Died: 21 June 1954 (aged 53); London, England
- Military career
- Allegiance: Canada
- Branch: Canadian Army
- Rank: Major General
- Commands: 3rd Canadian Infantry Division
- Conflicts: Second World War
- Awards: Commander of the Order of the British Empire

Major General Rodney Frederick Leopold Keller CBE (2 October 1900 – 21 June 1954) was a Canadian Army officer who rose to divisional-level command in the Second World War. He commanded the 3rd Canadian Infantry Division which was assigned to take Juno Beach during the D-Day invasion.

== Background ==
Rod Keller was born in England and moved to Kelowna, British Columbia, around 1902. Keller left BC and entered the Royal Military College in Kingston, Ontario, in the last years of the First World War. Upon graduating, he joined Princess Patricia's Canadian Light Infantry, one of the regiments of the Canadian Permanent Force, the full-time professional army. Like many other promising Canadian officers of that era, he attended Staff College, Camberley, in England.

== War service ==
When Canada went to war, Rod Keller was sent overseas as a brigade major. He rose to the command of Princess Patricia's Canadian Light Infantry in 1941 and was promoted Officer Commanding the 1st Canadian Infantry Brigade a few months later. Keller was made a major-general and, between September 8, 1942, and August 8, 1944, he served as General Officer Commanding the 3rd Canadian Infantry Division. Major-General Keller was popular with his troops, who appreciated his manners and outspoken language; however, a drinking problem and several breaches of security measures before D-Day cost him the support of both his superior officers and his own staff.

Ernest Côté, the quartermaster of the 3rd Division, called Keller a "conventional tactician" who was "very much a spit and polish officer who cut quite a figure in his battledress. We always cut a spare uniform for him, ironed and ready to go just in case. He cared for the division and was sensitive to any slight on its reputation. He was a very proud man and on top of the division's training."

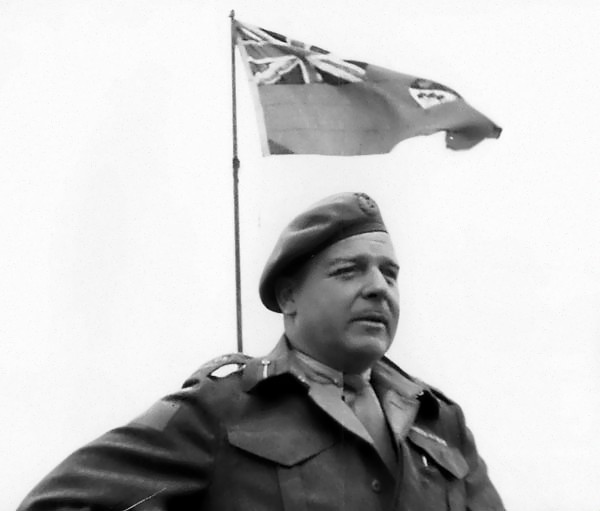
Major General R.F.L. Keller addressing Canadian troops in Normandy, August 2, 1944.

During the first month ashore in Normandy, it was noted he was "jumpy and high strung". The quartermaster of the 3rd Division, Côté was frustrated with Keller's chronic indecisiveness on D-Day and later stated in an interview that the responsibility of command seemed to be too much for him. Keller's immediate superiors in I British Corps and 2nd British Army considered him unfit to command the division, but Lieutenant General Guy Simonds, who was scheduled to command II Canadian Corps upon its activation in Normandy, held off on making a decision about his relief, even refusing a resignation by Keller who himself admitted to the strain. During the Battle for Caen, Keller handled Operation Windsor poorly, sending a reinforced brigade in to handle a divisional operation and delegating the planning to one of his brigadiers. Keller was also reportedly shell-shy by August, and rumours began to spread among the division that "Keller was yeller."

Despite the continued complaints from above and below, Simonds, and Lieutenant General Harry Crerar, another of his admirers and commander of the First Canadian Army, refused to relieve him. Fate intervened when he was wounded by friendly fire on August 8. US bombers accidentally carpet bombed his divisional headquarters during Operation Totalize. Keller received no further active military command. Ten years later, in 1954, he died of a heart attack while in London after visiting Normandy.

== Legacy ==
The Royal Military College of Canada was presented with an oil painting of Keller in 1965. Keller was RMC graduate Number 1341.

Military offices
Preceded by Charles Basil Price	GOV 3rd Canadian Infantry Division; 1942–1944	Succeeded by Daniel Spry
