= 5th Battalion (Western Cavalry), CEF =

- Distinguishing patch of the battalion
- Active: 1914–1920
- Disbanded: 1920
- Country: Canada
- Branch: Canadian Expeditionary Force
- Type: Infantry
- Size: One Battalion
- Part of: 2nd Canadian Infantry Brigade, 1st Canadian Division
- Mobilization headquarters: Camp Valcartier
- Nickname: Tuxford's Dandies
- Engagements: First World War
- Battle honours: Ypres, 1915, '17; Gravenstafel; St. Julien; Festubert, 1915; Mount Sorrel; Somme, 1916; Thiepval; Ancre Heights; Arras, 1917, '18; Vimy, 1917; Arleux; Hill 70; Passchendaele; Amiens; Scarpe, 1918; Drocourt–Quéant; Hindenburg Line; Canal du Nord; Pursuit to Mons; France and Flanders, 1915–18

Commanders
- Notable commanders: BGen George Tuxford

The 5th Battalion (Western Cavalry), CEF, known as "Tuxford's Dandys," was an infantry battalion of the Canadian Expeditionary Force during the Great War.

== History ==
The 5th Battalion was authorized on 10 August 1914 and embarked for Great Britain on 29 September 1914. It entered the theatre of operations in France on 14 February 1915, where it fought as part of the 2nd Canadian Infantry Brigade, 1st Canadian Division in France and Flanders until the end of the war. The battalion was disbanded on 15 September 1920.

The 5th Battalion recruited in Brandon, Manitoba; Saskatoon, Regina and Moose Jaw, Saskatchewan; Red Deer, Alberta and Merritt and Vernon, British Columbia and was mobilized at Camp Valcartier, Quebec.

The battalion fought in the attack on Vimy Ridge with 14 officers and 350 other ranks killed or wounded.

The 5th Battalion had five officers commanding:

- Lieutenant-Colonel George Tuxford, 22 September 1915-January 11, 1916
- Lieutenant-Colonel H.M. Dyer, DSO, 11 January 1916 – 29 June 1917
- Lieutenant-Colonel L.P.O. Tudor, DSO, 29 June 1917 – 8 March 1918
- Lieutenant-Colonel L.L. Crawford, DSO, 8 March 1918 – 4 April 1918
- Lieutenant-Colonel L.P.O. Tudor, DSO, 4 April 1918-Demobilization

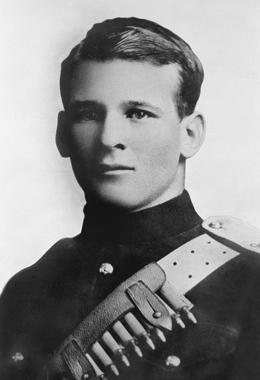
Sgt. Raphael Zengel, VC, MM, the 5th Battalion (Western Cavalry), CEF.

Sgt. Raphael Louis Zengel of the 5th Battalion was awarded the Victoria Cross for his action on 9 August 1918 at Warvillers, France. He had previously been awarded the Military Medal.

== Battle honours ==
The 5th Battalion was awarded the following battle honours in 1929:

- YPRES, 1915, '17
- Gravenstafel
- St. Julien
- FESTUBERT, 1915
- MOUNT SORREL
- SOMME, 1916
- Thiepval
- Ancre Heights
- ARRAS, 1917, '18
- Vimy, 1917
- Arleux
- HILL 70
- Passchendaele
- AMIENS
- Scarpe, 1918
- Drocourt-Quéant
- HINDENBURG LINE
- Canal du Nord
- PURSUIT TO MONS
- FRANCE AND FLANDERS, 1915-18

== Perpetuation ==
The perpetuation of the 5th Battalion (Western Cavalry), CEF, was initially assigned in 1920 to 1st Battalion, The North Saskatchewan Regiment, and has been passed down through the following units:

- 1920–1924: 1st Battalion (5th Battalion, CEF), The North Saskatchewan Regiment
- 1924–1936: 1st Battalion (5th Battalion, CEF), The Saskatoon Light Infantry
- 1936–1955: The Saskatoon Light Infantry (Machine Gun)
- 1955–1958: The North Saskatchewan Regiment (Machine Gun)
- 1958–present: The North Saskatchewan Regiment

== See also ==
- List of infantry battalions in the Canadian Expeditionary Force

== Sources ==
- Canadian Expeditionary Force 1914-1919 by Col G.W.L. Nicholson, CD, Queens's Printer, Ottawa, Ontario, 1962
- 5th Battalion, Canadian Expeditionary Force Study Group
