= 14th Battalion (Royal Montreal Regiment), CEF =

Battalion of the First World War Canadian Expeditionary Force

- WWI distinguishing patch of the 14th Battalion (Royal Montreal Regiment), CEF.
- Active: 1914-1920
- Country: Canada
- Branch: Canadian Expeditionary Force
- Role: Infantry
- Size: battalion
- Engagements: First World War

The 14th Battalion (Royal Montreal Regiment), CEF was a battalion of the First World War Canadian Expeditionary Force.

== History ==
The 14th Battalion was authorized on 1 September 1914 and embarked for Great Britain on 27 and 29 September 1914. It disembarked in France on 15 February 1915, where it fought as part of the 3rd Canadian Brigade, 1st Canadian Division in France and Flanders until the end of the war. The battalion disbanded on 15 September 1920.

The battalion fought at the centre of the 3rd Brigade during the attack on Vimy Ridge and faced strong opposition. Several German strongpoints had survived the creeping barrage and their machine-guns caught the 14th in the open. By the end of the day the battalion's casualties were 92 killed and 173 wounded.

== Perpetuations ==
The battalion is perpetuated by The Royal Montreal Regiment.

== Battle honours ==
- Ypres 1915, 17
- Gravenstafel
- St. Julien
- Festubert, 1915
- Mount Sorrel
- Somme, 1916
- Pozieres
- Thiepval
- Ancre Heights
- Arras 1917, '18
- Vimy, 1917
- Arleux
- Scarpe, 1917, '18
- Hill 70
- Passchendaele
- Amiens
- Drocourt-Quéant
- Hindenburg Line
- Canal du Nord
- Pursuit to Mons
- France and Flanders, 1915-18

== See also ==
- List of infantry battalions in the Canadian Expeditionary Force
