= Canada's Hundred Days =

Series of attacks in World War I

Canada's Hundred Days was the name given to the series of attacks made by the Canadian Corps between 8 August and 11 November 1918, during the Hundred Days Offensive of World War I by the French after the war. Reference to this period as Canada's Hundred Days is due to the role that the Canadian Corps repeatedly played as a spearhead during offensives.

During this time, the Canadian Corps fought as part of the British Fourth Army in the Battle of Amiens, then as part of the British First Army in the Second Battle of the Somme, Battle of the Scarpe, Battle of the Canal du Nord, Battle of Cambrai, Battle of the Selle, Battle of Valenciennes and finally at Mons, on the final day of combat before the Armistice of 11 November 1918. In terms of numbers, during those 96 days the Canadian Corps' four over-strength or "heavy" divisions totalling roughly 100,000 men, engaged and defeated or put to flight elements of 47 German divisions, which represented one quarter of the German forces faced by the Allied Powers fighting on the Western Front. However, their successes came at a heavy cost; Canadians suffered 20% of their battle-sustained casualties of the war during those "hundred days". The Canadian Corps suffered 45,835 casualties during this offensive.

For actions taken during the course of those hundred days, 29 Canadian soldiers were awarded the Victoria Cross, the highest Commonwealth medal for gallantry and valour. Evidence of the intense fighting at the time, ten of them were awarded posthumously. Seven of the VCs were awarded for actions taken on just one day, 2 September 1918, by Canadian soldiers fighting along the 30-kilometre-long Drocourt–Quéant Line near Arras, France: Bellenden Hutcheson, Arthur George Knight, William Henry Metcalf, Claude Nunney, Cyrus Wesley Peck, Walter Leigh Rayfield and John Francis Young. As well, a Newfoundlander soldier operating in a unit separate from the Canadian forces (Newfoundland was not yet part of Canada), Thomas Ricketts, was awarded the VC for actions taken during those hundred days.

== Background ==
The German spring offensive, which began with Operation Michael in March 1918, had petered out by the Second Battle of the Marne in July. By this time the German superiority of numbers on the Western Front had sunk to a negligible lead which would be reversed as more American troops arrived. German manpower was exhausted. The German High Command predicted they would need 200,000 men per month to make good the losses suffered. Returning convalescents could supply 70,000–80,000 per month but there were only 300,000 recruits available from the next annual class of eighteen-year-olds. The German failure to break through at the Second Battle of the Marne, or to destroy the Allied armies in the field, allowed Ferdinand Foch, the Supreme Allied Commander, to proceed with the planned major counteroffensive at the Battle of Soissons on 18 July. By this point in time, the American Expeditionary Forces (AEF) was present in France in large numbers and invigorated the Allied armies. Likewise, the British Expeditionary Force (BEF) had also been reinforced by large numbers of troops returned from the Sinai and Palestine campaign and the Italian Front and replacements held back in Britain by the Prime Minister, David Lloyd George. Foch agreed on a proposal by Field Marshal Sir Douglas Haig, commander of the BEF, to strike on the Southeast of Amiens with the intention of forcing the Germans away from the Amiens–Paris railway.

Meanwhile the Canadian Corps had proven itself to be made up of aggressive soldiers and proficient commanders. Although having been in the war since 1914, it still showed energy and ambition, by now augmented with battlefield skill and experience.

== Battles ==
=== Battle of Amiens ===
The allied command had developed an understanding that the Germans had learned to suspect and prepare for an attack when they found the Canadian Corps moved in and massed on a new sector of the front lines. British Prime Minister David Lloyd George reflected this attitude when he wrote in his memoirs: "Whenever the Germans found the Canadian Corps coming into the line they prepared for the worst." A deception operation was devised to conceal and misrepresent the Canadians position in the front. A detachment from the Corps of two infantry battalions, a wireless unit and a casualty clearing station had been sent to the front near Ypres to bluff the Germans that the entire Corps was moving north to Flanders. Meanwhile, the majority of the Canadian Corps was marched to Amiens in secret. Allied commanders included the notice "Keep Your Mouth Shut" into orders issued to the men, and referred to the action as a "raid" rather than an "offensive". To maintain secrecy, there was to be no pre-battle bombardment, only artillery fire immediately prior to the advance. The plan instead depended on large-scale use of tanks to achieve surprise, by avoiding a preliminary bombardment, a tactic successfully employed at the Battle of Hamel.

The battle began in dense fog at 4:20 am on 8 August. Under Rawlinson's Fourth Army, the British III Corps attacked north of the Somme, the Australian Corps to the south of the river in the centre of Fourth Army's front, and the Canadian Corps to the south of the Australians. The French 1st Army under General Debeney opened its preliminary bombardment at the same time, and began its advance 45 minutes later. The operation was supported by more than 500 tanks, which helped to cut through the numerous barbed wire defences employed by the Germans.

The first day of the attack, August 8, saw the attacking forces break through the German lines in dramatic fashion, with the Canadians pushing as far as 13 kilometres (8.1 mi) from their starting points. In many places the fog provided good cover for their advances in and through the furrows of the valley of the Luce river which ran through the centre of the Canadian's portion of the battlefield. The tanks were successful in this battle, as they attacked German rear positions, creating panic and confusion. The swift advance led to a rapidly spreading collapse in German morale that ultimately led Erich Ludendorff to dub it "the Black Day of the German Army" when he was told of the psychological impact on his men.

Continuing to press the advantage gained on Day One, the advance continued for three more days but without the spectacular results of August 8, since the rapid advance outran the supporting artillery that could not be repositioned as quickly as the infantry advanced. By the 10th of August, the Germans had been forced to pull out of the salient that they had managed to occupy during Operation Michael in March, back towards the Hindenburg Line. Left without an enemy to fight or a plan to pursue the retreat the Allied advances in the Amiens sector including those of the Canadians petered out by 13 August and the Amiens operation was halted.

The Canadians remained on the scene at Amiens until 22 August, consolidating their gains and prepared to defend against counter-attack. On the 23rd they were summoned to pull out and go into the line east of Arras for an attack that was to commence three days later. There they were stationed in the villages of Fouquescourt, Maucourt, Chilly and Hallu from which they would attack eastward toward the Hindenburg Line.

At Amiens the four Canadian Divisions faced and defeated or put to flight ten full German Divisions and elements of five others that sat astride their boundaries with the Australians and French on either side of them. In the five earnest days of fighting between the 8th and 13 August the Canadian Corps captured 9,131 prisoners, 190 artillery pieces, and over 1,000 machine guns and trench mortars. The deepest extent of penetration from their jumping off points was approximately 23 km (14 mi), and in total the Canadians liberated an area of more than 170 km^{2} (67 mi^{2}) which contained 27 towns and villages.

=== Breaking the Hindenburg Line ===
In Arras, the Canadians attacked eastward, smashing the outer defence lines near the powerful Drocourt-Quéant Line (the Wotan Stellung section of the Hindenburg line), along the Arras-Cambrai road. On September 2, the Canadian Corps smashed the Drocourt-Quéant line, and broke its main support position, taking 5,622 casualties, which brought the total losses of the Arras-Cambrai operation up to 11,423 casualties. After this, the Germans retreated across the Canal du Nord, which was almost completely flooded.

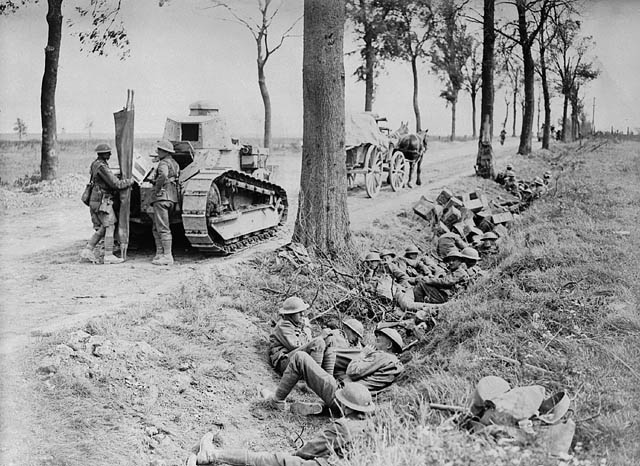
Canadian troops shelter in a ditch along the Arras-Cambrai road.

At the Battle of the Canal du Nord, following up the first breaking of the Hindenburg line, the Canadians used a complex manoeuvre to attack along the side of the canal through an unfinished dry section. The Canadians built bridges and crossed the canal at night, surprising the Germans with an attack in the morning. This proved the ability of Canadian engineers to construct new roads to cross the canal efficiently without the Germans noticing. The specialisation of troops and formally organised battalions of combat engineers was also effective as it allowed the soldiers to rest instead of working every day that they were not actively attacking.

The Canadians then broke the Hindenburg line a second time, this time during the Battle of Cambrai, which (along with the Australian, British and American break further south at the Battle of St. Quentin Canal) resulted in a collapse of German morale.

This collapse forced the German High Command to accept that the war had to be ended. The evidence of failing German morale also convinced many Allied commanders and political leaders that the war could be ended in 1918. (Previously, all efforts had been concentrated on building up forces to mount a decisive attack in 1919.)

=== Pursuit to Mons ===
As the war neared its end, the Canadian Corps pressed on towards Germany and the final phase of the war for the Canadians was known as the Pursuit to Mons. It was during these final thirty-two days of the war that the Canadians engaged the retreating Germans over about seventy kilometres in a running series of battles at Denain and Valenciennes in France and finally Mons in Belgium where they pushed the Germans out of the town on November 10–11. Mons was, coincidentally, where the British had engaged the German armies for the first time in battle in the Great War on August 23, 1914. As such, Mons is considered by some to be the place where the war both began and ended for the British Empire.

Some criticism was levelled at Canadian Corps commander Arthur Currie by Sam Hughes and others for needlessly wasting lives to capture Mons once it was known that the armistice was imminent. They claimed the soldiers who were killed and wounded in taking Mons were sacrificed for not a strategic, but a symbolic objective. The allegations even appeared in print in newspapers run by Hughes' family which led to Currie launching and winning a libel lawsuit against Hughes' son Garnet and others after the war. Currie successfully argued that he had been ordered to capture Mons by his superiors, that much of the town had been captured when the Armistice was announced at 6:30 am on the 11th, and that the war's end was not a certainty until the enemy finally stopped shooting.

== Legacy and memorials ==
Three war memorials stand in commemoration of the actions of the Canadian Corps during the Hundred Days' Offensive.

- The Le Quesnel Memorial commemorates the 1918 Battle of Amiens
- The Dury Memorial commemorates the Battle of the Scarpe (1918) and the Battle of Drocourt-Quéant Line
- The Bourlon Wood Memorial commemorates the final series of battles of the war including the Battle of the Canal du Nord and the Pursuit to Mons.
- The Canadian Corps' liberation of Mons is commemorated on a plaque that is on display in the entrance of the City Hall of Mons, just off of the Grand Place. It reads: "Mons was recaptured by the Canadian Corps on the 11th November 1918. After fifty months of German occupation freedom was restored to the city. Here was fired the last shot of the Great War."

== See also ==
- List of Canadian battles during World War I
