= Canadian Scottish Regiment (Princess Mary's) =

The Canadian Scottish Regiment (Princess Mary's)
- Cap badge of The Canadian Scottish Regiment (Princess Mary's)
- Active: 1912–present
- Country: Canada
- Branch: Canadian Army
- Type: Light Infantry
- Size: 1 Battalion
- Part of: 39 Canadian Brigade Group
- Armouries: Gen A.W. Currie Armoury (Victoria); Brig D.R. Sargent Armoury (Nanaimo); Seal Bay Armoury (Comox)
- Nickname: Scotts
- Patron: Mary, Princess Royal and Countess of Harewood
- Motto: Scottish Gaelic: Deas gu cath ("Ready for the fray" or "ready to sting" – see §Motto)
- Colours: Red, blue, and green
- March: The Blue Bonnets over the Border
- Mascots: Wallace VII, a Šarplaninac−Great Pyrenees cross
- Equipment: Small arms including the C7 rifle, C9 light machine-gun, C6 machine gun, and M203 grenade launcher, C13 fragmentation grenade, browning Hi power, 84mm Carl gustav.
- Engagements: First World War; Second World War; War in Afghanistan
- Battle honours: See #Battle honours
- Website: https://www.canada.ca/en/army/corporate/3-canadian-division/the-canadian-scottish-regiment.html

Commanders
- Colonel-in-chief: Princess Alexandra, The Honourable Lady Ogilvy
- Commander 39 CBG: Col P.A. Lindsay, CD
- Commanding Officer: LCol W.S. Lerch, OMM, CD
- Regimental Sergeant Major: CWO Jesse MacLeod, CD

Insignia
- Tartan: Hunting Stewart
- Abbreviation: C Scot R

The Canadian Scottish Regiment (Princess Mary's) is a Primary Reserve infantry regiment of the Canadian Army based on Vancouver Island in British Columbia.

The regiment is in Victoria, Nanaimo, and Courtenay, British Columbia. It is part of the 3rd Canadian Division's 39 Canadian Brigade Group, which commands all army reserve units in British Columbia. One of four infantry regiments in British Columbia, the Canadian Scottish is the largest reserve unit in Western Canada.

As a light infantry regiment the regiment trains in raids, reconnaissance patrolling, ambushes, amphibious operations and airmobile operations. The unit also trains to meet the realities of the "Three Block War" – warfighting, peacekeeping, and humanitarian support.

== General ==
The Canadian Scottish Regiment (Princess Mary's) is actively involved in sending troops to various Canadian missions around the world.

As of 2012, all members of the regiment who were serving on combat operations with the Canadian Expeditionary Force in Afghanistan have returned home.

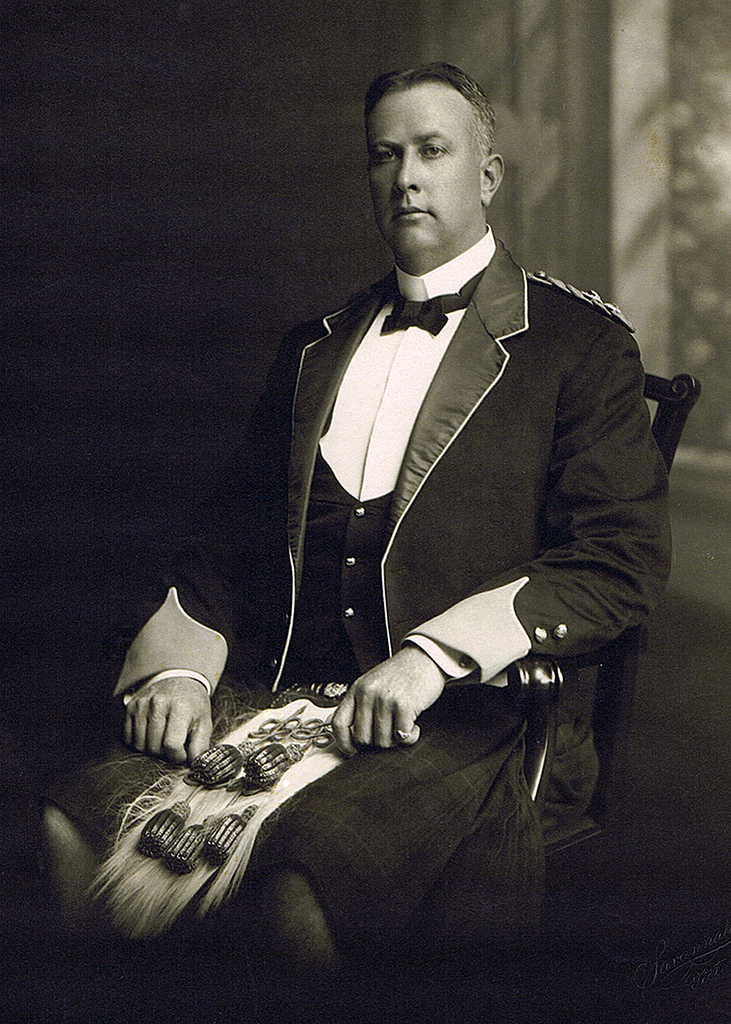
Lieutenant-Colonel Arthur Currie in Highlands dress of the 50th Regiment

Members of The Canadian Scottish Regiment have also been involved in peacekeeping missions; notably in Egypt, Golan Heights, Cyprus, Croatia, Bosnia, and Sierra Leone.

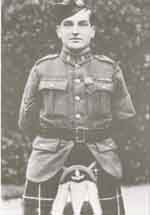
William Henry Metcalf, VC

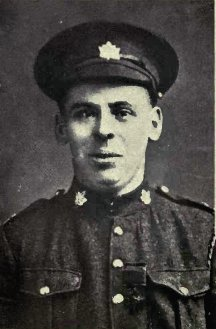
William Johnstone Milne, VC

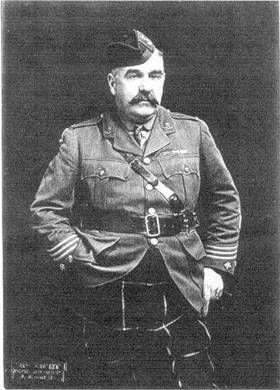
Cyrus Wesley Peck, VC

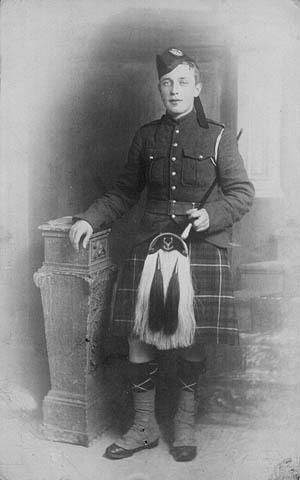
Piper James Cleland Richardson, VC, c. 1914–15. (Photo from Library and Archives Canada.)

The regiment originated on 3 September 1912 when the 88th Regiment, Victoria Fusiliers, was authorized. When the 16th (Canadian Scottish) Battalion, CEF, was created in 1914, it drew on soldiers from four separate regiments – the 50th Regiment (Gordon Highlanders of Canada) in Victoria, the 72nd Seaforth Highlanders of Canada in Vancouver, the 79th Regiment (Cameron Highlanders of Canada) in Winnipeg, and the 91st Canadian Highlanders (Argyll and Sutherland Highlanders) in Hamilton. The desire was to not perpetuate specific regimental identities and so the new battalion was simply referred to as "Canadian Scottish".

The 16th Battalion served in the 3rd Brigade of the 1st Canadian Division. Since its early beginnings, the battalion had a high standard of conduct on the battlefield and was commanded by outstanding leaders. One such was Lieutenant General Sir Arthur Currie who rose to command the Canadian Corps during the First World War. Currie was a master tactician whose skills led the Canadians to victory at the Vimy Ridge, the Amiens, and the intense last Hundred Days campaign which ended the Great War.

Four members of the 16th Battalion were awarded the Victoria Cross. Private William Milne single-handedly attacked and destroyed two enemy machine gun nests at Vimy Ridge on 9 April 1917 and was killed the same day. Lance Corporal William Henry Metcalf and Lieutenant Colonel Cyrus Peck MP, won their VC's on the same day: 2 September 1918 during the Canadian Corps capture of the Drocourt-Quéant Line. Piper James Richardson who was just 18 years old when he enlisted, and was killed on October 8, 1916, during the Battle of the Somme shortly after having played his company through No Man's Land. He disappeared in shellfire after going back to retrieve the bagpipes he laid aside to bring back a wounded comrade. Piper James Richardson's Pipes were returned to the regiment in the 2000s after being found on display at a private school in Scotland due to research initiated by Pipe Major Roger McGuire. They were presented to the people of B.C. on November 8, 2006, at a ceremony on the lawn on the Provincial Legislature in Victoria. The pipes are on display in the Canadian Scottish Regimental Museum in the Bay Street armoury.

After the war, the battalion disbanded, and in the 1920 re-organisation of the Militia, in the wake of the work of the Otter Commission, a new regiment was created amalgamating the 50th Regiment and the 88th Regiment Victoria Fusiliers, and named "The Canadian Scottish Regiment". The title "(Princess Mary's)" was appended in 1948 by permission of King George VI and Mary, Princess Royal and Countess of Harewood, who had consented to become colonel-in-chief of the regiment in 1930, being also colonel-in-chief of the Royal Scots (The Royal Regiment) since 1927, and to whom the Canadian Scottish had been allied in 1927.

The Canadian Scottish were unusual in 1939 in having two battalions on the strength of the Canadian Militia. The 1st Battalion was mobilized for overseas service in 1940 and trained in Debert, Nova Scotia, until August 1941, from where it moved to the United Kingdom as part of the 3rd Canadian Infantry Division. On 6 June 1944 C Company was in the first wave ashore in Normandy on Juno Beach, the rest of the battalion following in the second wave. The battalion proceeded to advance a total of six miles inland – farther than any other assault brigade of the British Second Army that day. The regiment went on to earn 17 battle honours, including one for the liberation of Wagenborgen, a Dutch village; this last honour was not awarded until the 1990s.

== Lineage ==
=== The Canadian Scottish Regiment (Princess Mary's) ===
- Originated 3 September 1912 in Victoria, British Columbia as the 88th Regiment (Victoria Fusiliers)
- Amalgamated 12 March 1920 with the 50th Regiment "Gordon Highlanders" and redesignated The Canadian Scottish Regiment
- Redesignated 7 November 1940 as the 3rd (Reserve) Battalion, The Canadian Scottish Regiment
- Redesignated 26 March 1942 as the 3rd (Reserve) Battalion, The Canadian Scottish Regiment (Machine Gun)
- Redesignated 1 April 1946 as The Canadian Scottish Regiment
- Redesignated 29 April 1948 as The Canadian Scottish Regiment (Princess Mary's)
- Amalgamated 31 December 1954 with the 66th Light Anti-Aircraft Regiment, RCA and the 62nd Anti-Tank Battery (Self-Propelled), RCA, retaining its designation as The Canadian Scottish Regiment (Princess Mary's)

=== The 50th Regiment "Highlanders" ===
- Originated 15 August 1913 in Victoria, British Columbia as an "8 company Highland Regiment of Infantry"
- Designated 21 November 1913 as the 50th Regiment "Highlanders"
- Amalgamated 12 March 1920 with the 88th Regiment Victoria Fusiliers

=== 66th Light Anti-Aircraft Regiment, RCA ===
- Originated 1 August 1930 in Nanaimo, British Columbia as the 2nd Battalion, The Canadian Scottish Regiment
- Amalgamated 15 December 1936 with "A" Company, 11th Machine Gun Battalion, CMGC, and redesignated as the 2nd Battalion (Machine Gun), The Canadian Scottish Regiment
- Redesignated 7 November 1940 as the 2nd (Reserve) Battalion (Machine Gun), The Canadian Scottish Regiment
- Redesignated 1 January 1941 as the 2nd Battalion, The Canadian Scottish Regiment
- Redesignated 15 October 1943 as the 2nd (Reserve) Battalion, The Canadian Scottish Regiment
- Converted 1 April 1946 to artillery and redesignated as the 66th Light Anti-Aircraft Regiment (Canadian Scottish Regiment), RCA
- Amalgamated 31 December 1954 with The Canadian Scottish Regiment (Princess Mary's) and the 62nd Anti-Tank Battery, RCA

=== 62nd Anti-Tank Battery (Self-Propelled), RCA ===
- Originated 2 February 1920 in Duncan, British Columbia as the 62nd Field Battery (Howitzer), CFA
- Redesignated 1 July 1925 as the 62nd Field Battery, CA
- Redesignated 3 June 1935 as the 62nd Field Battery (Howitzer), RCA
- Redesignated 7 November 1940 as the 62nd (Reserve) Field Battery (Howitzer), RCA
- Redesignated 1 April 1946 as the 62nd Anti-Tank Battery (Self-Propelled), RCA

Amalgamated 31 December 1954 with The Canadian Scottish Regiment (Princess Mary's) and the 66th Light Anti-Aircraft Regiment (Canadian Scottish Regiment), RCA

=== Chart ===
Lineage chart

1912	88th Regt Victoria Fusiliers
1913	50th Regt "Highlanders"
1914	16th Bn, CEF	48th Bn, CEF
1915	88th "Overseas" Bn, CEF	67th "Overseas" Bn, CEF	143rd "Overseas" Bn, CEF	103rd "Overseas" Bn, CEF
1916	Absorbed by 30th Reserve Bn	67th Canadian (Pioneer) Bn, CEF	3rd Canadian Pioneer Bn, CEF
1917	Absorbed by Canadian Corps	Absorbed by Canadian Corps	Absorbed by 24th Reserve Bn and CRT Training Depot	Absorbed by 16th Reserve Bn
1920	Disbanded
1920	1st Bn (16th Bn, CEF), The Canadian Scottish Regt	2nd Bn (48th Bn, CEF), (Note: Reserve) The Canadian Scottish Regt	3rd Bn (67th Bn, CEF), The Canadian Scottish Regt	4th Bn (88th Bn, CEF), The Canadian Scottish Regt	5th Bn (143rd Bn, CEF), The Canadian Scottish Regt
1930	2nd Bn (88th Bn, CEF), The Canadian Scottish Regt	3rd Bn (67th Bn, CEF), The Canadian Scottish Regt	4th Bn (48th Bn, CEF), The Canadian Scottish Regt	5th Bn (143rd Bn, CEF), The Canadian Scottish Regt	6th Bn (103rd Bn, CEF), The Canadian Scottish Regt
"A" Coy, 11th MG Bn, CMGC
1936	Disbanded	Disbanded	Disbanded	Disbanded
1936	1st Bn, The Canadian Scottish Regt	2nd Bn (MG), The Canadian Scottish Regt
1940	1st Bn, The Canadian Scottish Regt, CASF	3rd (Reserve) Bn, The Canadian Scottish Regt	2nd (Reserve) Bn (MG), The Canadian Scottish Regt
1941	2nd Bn, The Canadian Scottish Regt, CASF
1942	3rd (Reserve) Bn, The Canadian Scottish Regt (MG)
1943	2nd (Reserve) Bn, The Canadian Scottish Regt
1945	4th Bn, The Canadian Scottish Regt, CIC, CAOF
1946	Disbanded	The Canadian Scottish Regt	66th LAA Regt (Canadian Scottish Regt), RCA	Disbanded	62nd Anti-Tank Bty (Self-Propelled), RCA (Note: 41st Anti-Tank Regiment (Self-Propelled), RCA)
1948	The Canadian Scottish Regt (Princess Mary's)
1951	"E" Coy, (Note: Regular Force) The Canadian Scottish Regt (Princess Mary's)	"F" Coy, The Canadian Scottish Regt (Princess Mary's)
1951	Absorbed by 1st Canadian Highland Bn
1952	Absorbed by 2nd Canadian Highland Bn
1954	The Canadian Scottish Regt (Princess Mary's)

== Perpetuations ==
- 16th Battalion (Canadian Scottish), CEF
- 48th Battalion (British Columbia), CEF, later the 3rd Pioneer Battalion, CEF
- 67th Battalion (Western Scots), CEF
- 88th Battalion (Victoria Fusiliers), CEF
- 103rd Battalion, CEF
- 143rd Battalion (British Columbia Bantams), CEF

== Motto ==
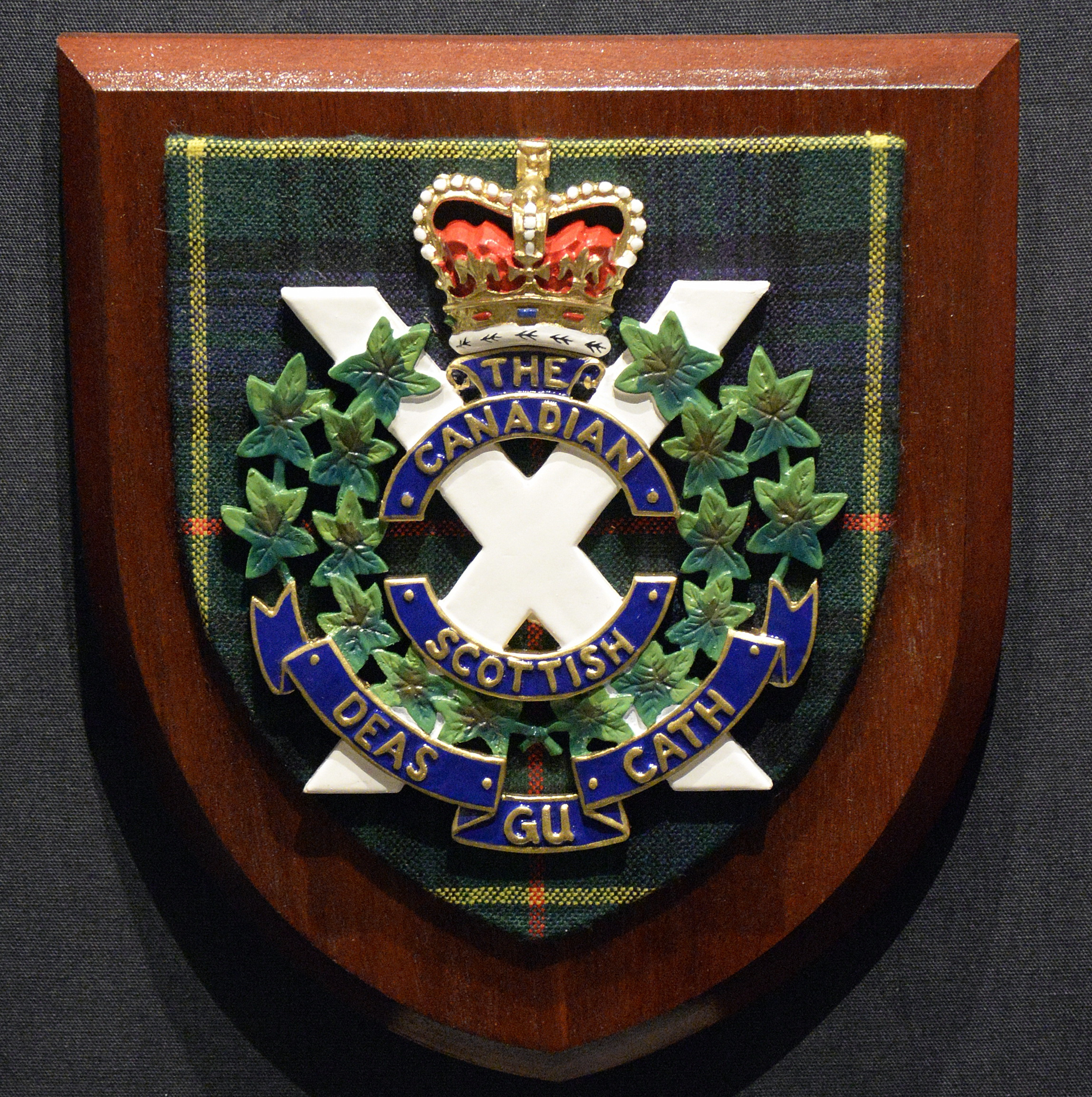
Badge of the Canadian-Scottish Regiment (Princess Mary's). Museum of the Royal Scots (The Royal Regiment) and the Royal Regiment of Scotland. Edinburgh Castle, Scotland

There are two English translations of the regiment's Gaelic motto Deas gu cath. Regimental histories and sources close to the regiment itself translate it as "Ready for the Fray" However, the Canadian Forces' Directorate of History and Heritage and the federal government's terminology database translate it as "Ready to sting".

== Operational history ==
The camp flag of The Canadian Scottish Regiment (Princess Mary's).

=== The Great War ===
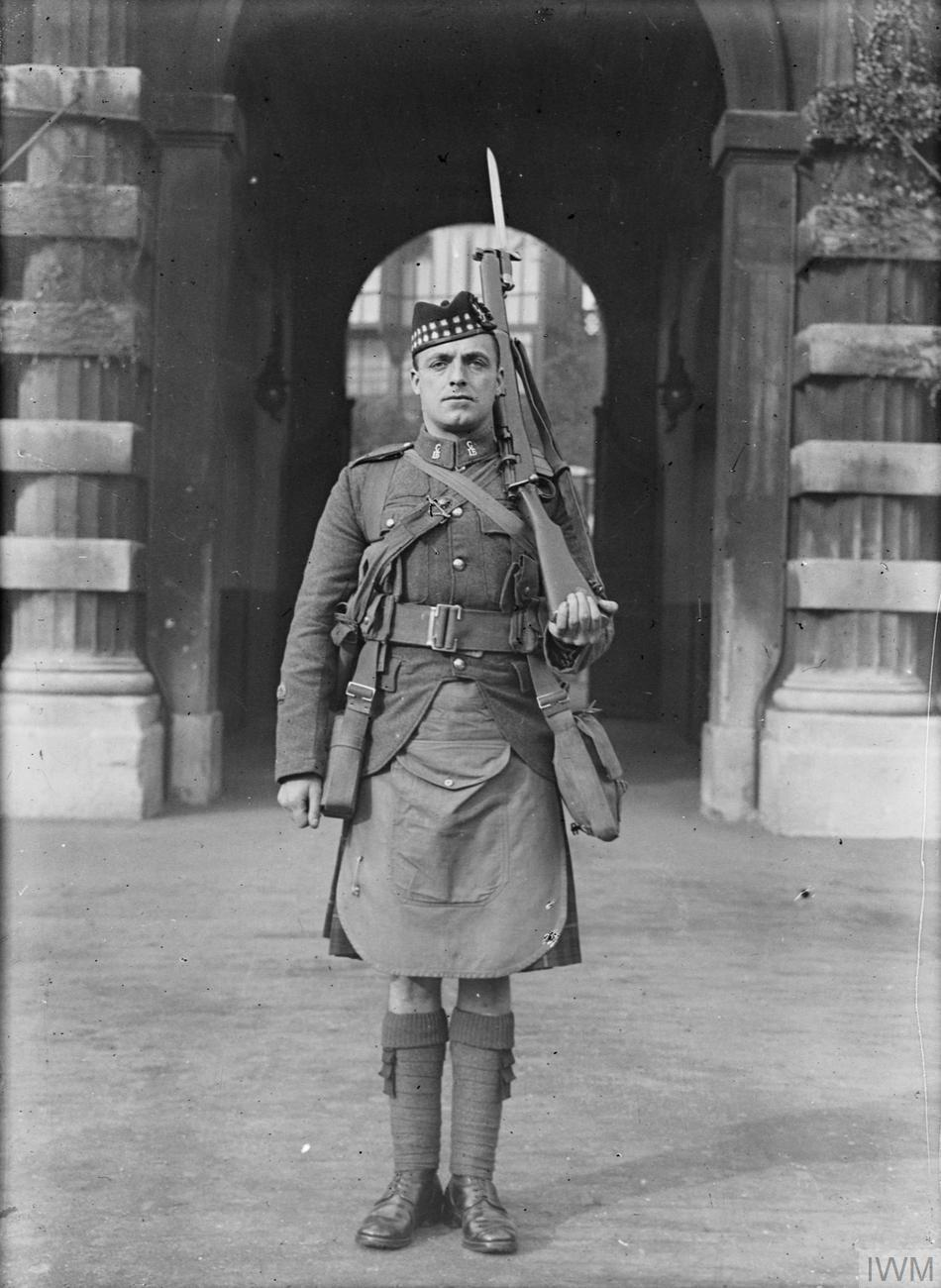
A company sergeant major of the 16th Battalion, in full marching order during World War I

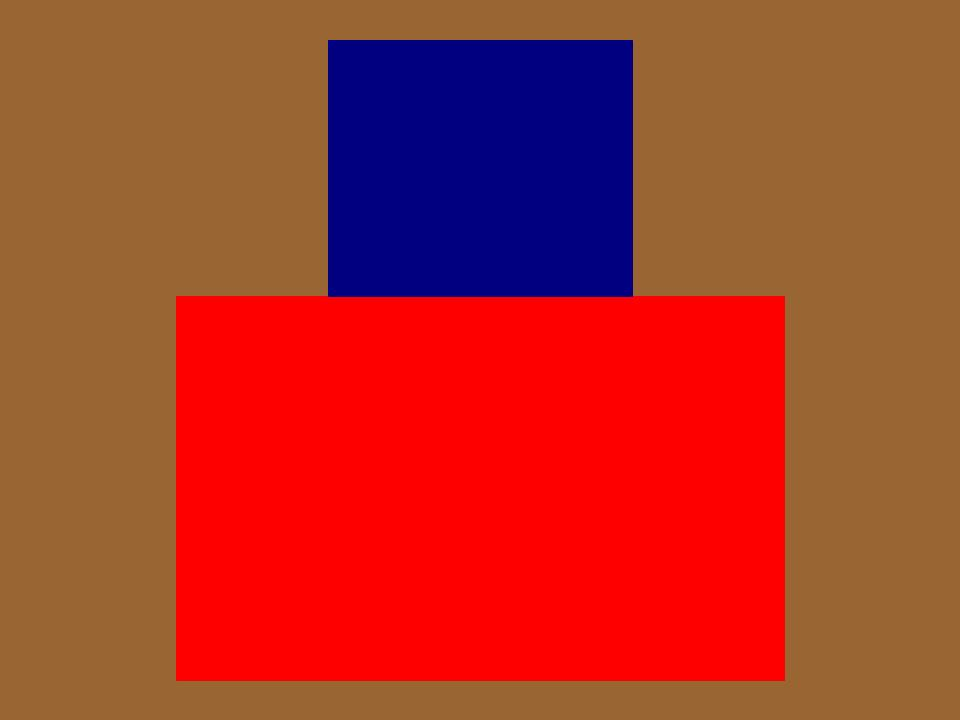
The distinguishing patch of the 16th Battalion (Canadian Scottish), CEF.

The 50th Regiment Gordon Highlanders and the 88th Regiment Victoria Fusiliers were placed on active service on 6 August 1914 for local protection duties.

The 16th Battalion (Canadian Scottish), CEF, was authorized on 1 September 1914 and embarked for Britain on 28 September 1914. It disembarked in France on 15 February 1915, where it fought as part of the 3rd Infantry Brigade, 1st Canadian Division in France and Flanders until the end of the war. The battalion was disbanded on 30 August 1920.

The 48th Battalion (British Columbia), CEF, was authorized on 7 November 1914 and embarked for Britain on 1 July 1915, where it was converted to a pioneer battalion and redesignated as the 3rd Canadian Pioneer Battalion, CEF, on 6 January 1916. It disembarked in France on 9 March 1916, where it served as part of the 3rd Canadian Division in France and Flanders until 17 April 1917, when its personnel were absorbed by the Canadian Corps in the field. The battalion was disbanded on 30 August 1920.

The 67th Battalion (Western Scots), CEF, was authorized on 20 April 1915 and embarked for Britain on 1 April 1916 where it was converted to a pioneer battalion and redesignated as the 67th Canadian (Pioneer) Battalion, CEF, on 15 May 1916. It disembarked in France on 14 August 1916, where it served as part of the 4th Canadian Division in France and Flanders until 28 April 1917, when its personnel were absorbed by the Canadian Corps in the field. The battalion was disbanded on 30 August 1920.

The 88th Battalion (Victoria Fusiliers), CEF, was authorized on 22 December 1915 and embarked for Britain on 31 May 1916. It provided reinforcements for the Canadian Corps in the field until 18 July 1916, when its personnel were absorbed by the 30th Reserve Battalion, CEF.

The 103rd Battalion, CEF, was authorized on 22 December 1915 and embarked for Britain on 23 July 1916, where it provided reinforcements for the Canadian Corps in the field until 7 January 1917, when its personnel were absorbed by the 16th Reserve Battalion, CEF. The 88th and 103rd Battalions were disbanded on 1 September 1917.

The 143rd Battalion (British Columbia Bantams), CEF, was authorized on 22 December 1915 and embarked for Britain on 17 February 1917, where its personnel were absorbed by the 24th Reserve Battalion, CEF, and the Canadian Railway Troops Training Depot on 15 March 1917 to provide reinforcements to the Canadian Corps in the field. The battalion was disbanded on 4 April 1918.

=== The Second World War ===
Details from the 1st Battalion were called out on service on 26 August 1939 and then placed on active service on 1 September 1939 for local protection duties. Details from the 2nd Battalion were placed on active service on 1 September 1939 for local protection duties. Details from the 62nd Field Battery, RCA were placed on active service on 1 September 1939 for local protection duties. These details were disbanded on 31 December 1940.

The regiment mobilized the 1st Battalion, The Canadian Scottish Regiment, CASF, on 24 May 1940. It embarked for Britain on 25 August 1941. On D-Day, 6 June 1944, it landed in Normandy, France, as part of the 7th Infantry Brigade, 3rd Canadian Infantry Division, and it continued to fight in North-West Europe until the end of the war. The overseas battalion was disbanded on 15 January 1946.

The regiment subsequently mobilized the 2nd (Reserve) Battalion as the 2nd Battalion, The Canadian Scottish Regiment, CASF, on 1 January 1941. It served in Canada in a home defence role as part of the 13th Infantry Brigade, 6th Canadian Infantry Division. The battalion was disbanded on 15 October 1943.

On 1 June 1945, a third Active Force component of the regiment, designated the 4th Battalion, The Canadian Scottish Regiment, CIC, Canadian Army Occupation Force, was mobilized for service in post-war Germany. The battalion was disbanded on 29 April 1946.

The 62nd Field Battery, in conjunction with the 44th Field Battery, RCA, mobilized the 44th/62nd Field Battery, RCA, CASF, for active service on 24 May 1940. This unit was reorganized as two separate batteries on 1 January 1941, designated the 44th Field Battery, RCA, CASF, and the 62nd Field Battery, RCA, CASF. It was redesignated the 62nd Light Anti-Aircraft Battery, RCA, CASF, the same day. The battery provided light anti-aircraft artillery support as part of the 11th Light Anti-Aircraft Regiment, RCA, CASF, 1st Canadian Anti-Aircraft Brigade in Great Britain. The overseas battery was disbanded on 1 March 1944.

=== Post-War:Korea and NATO ===
On 4 May 1951, the regiment mobilized two temporary Active Force companies designated "E" and "F" Company. "E" Company was reduced to nil strength when its personnel were incorporated into the 1st Canadian Highland Battalion (later the 1st Battalion, The Black Watch (Royal Highland Regiment) of Canada) for service in Germany with the North Atlantic Treaty Organization. It disbanded on 29 July 1953. "F" Company was initially used as a reinforcement pool for "E" Company. On 15 May 1952, it was reduced to nil strength when its personnel were absorbed by the newly formed 2nd Canadian Highland Battalion (later the 2nd Battalion, The Black Watch (Royal Highland Regiment) of Canada) for service in Korea with the United Nations. "F" Company disbanded on 29 July 1953.[7]

=== Afghanistan ===
The regiment contributed an aggregate of more than 20% of its authorized strength to the various Task Forces which served in Afghanistan between 2002 and 2014.

== Battle honours ==
The regimental colour of The Canadian Scottish Regiment (Princess Mary's).

In the list below, battle honours in capitals were awarded for participation in large operations and campaigns, while those in lowercase indicate honours granted for more specific battles. Those battle honours in bold are emblazoned on the regimental colour. The old colours of the 88th Regiment Victoria Fusiliers were laid up in St. Mary the Virgin Anglican Church in Oak Bay from 1920 to 2023, when they were transferred to Canadian Scottish Regimental Museum. The retired regimental colours of the 16th Battalion CEF, 1st Battalion The Canadian Scottish Regiment and The Canadian Scottish Regiment (Princess Mary's) are laid up in Christ Church Cathedral (the regiment's kirk), Victoria. The retired regimental colours of the 2nd Battalion The Canadian Scottish Regiment are laid up in St. Paul's Anglican Church, Nanaimo.

First World War
- **Ypres, 1915, '17**
- Gravenstafel
- **St. Julien**
- **Festubert, 1915**
- **Mount Sorrel**
- **Somme, 1916**
- Pozières
- Flers–Courcelette
- Thiepval
- Ancre Heights
- Ancre, 1916
- Arras, 1917, '18
- **Vimy, 1917**
- Arleux
- Scarpe, 1917, '18
- Hill 70
- **Passchendaele**
- **Amiens**
- **Drocourt–Quéant**
- Hindenburg Line
- **Canal du Nord**
- Pursuit to Mons
- France and Flanders, 1915–18

Honorary distinction: oak leaf shoulder badge for the actions of the 16th "Overseas" Battalion, CEF, at Kitcheners' Wood on 22/23 April 1915

Second World War
- **Normandy Landing**
- **Putot-en-Bessin**
- **Caen**
- The Orne
- **Falaise**
- The Laison
- **Calais, 1944**
- The Scheldt
- **Leopold Canal**
- Breskens Pocket
- **The Rhineland**
- Waal Flats
- **Moyland Wood**
- The Rhine
- **Emmerich–Hoch Elten**
- **Deventer**
- Wagenborgen
- North-West Europe, 1944–1945
South-West Asia
Afghanistan

== History ==
Following the Great War, on 12 March 1920, the 50th and 88th Regiments were amalgamated and redesignated The Canadian Scottish Regiment, organized as a five-battalion regiment with the 1st Battalion (16th Battalion, CEF) on the Non-Permanent Active Militia order of battle and the 2nd Battalion (48th Battalion, CEF), 3rd Battalion (67th Battalion, CEF), 4th Battalion (88th Battalion, CEF), and 5th Battalion (143rd Battalion, CEF) on the Reserve order of battle. On 1 August 1930, The Canadian Scottish Regiment was reorganized as a six-battalion regiment with the 1st Battalion (16th Battalion, CEF) and 2nd Battalion (88th Battalion, CEF) (see below) on the Non Permanent Active Militia order of battle and the 3rd Battalion (67th Battalion, CEF), 4th Battalion (48th Battalion, CEF), 5th Battalion (143rd Battalion, CEF), and 6th Battalion (103rd Battalion, CEF) on the Reserve order of battle. The reserve units were disbanded on 14 December 1936.

On 1 April 1946, The Canadian Scottish Regiment was reorganized as a one-battalion regiment and on 29 April 1948, the regiment was redesignated The Canadian Scottish Regiment (Princess Mary's).

On 4 May 1951, the regiment mobilized two temporary Active Force companies designated "E" and "F" Company. "E" Company was reduced to nil strength upon its personnel being incorporated into the 1st Canadian Highland Battalion (which later became the 1st Battalion the Black Watch (Royal Highland Regiment) of Canada) for service in Germany with the North Atlantic Treaty Organization. "F" Company was initially used as a reinforcement pool for "E" Company. On 15 May 1952, it was reduced to nil strength, upon its personnel being absorbed by the newly formed 2nd Canadian Highland Battalion (which later became the 2nd Battalion the Black Watch of Canada) for service in Korea with the United Nations.

On 31 December 1954, the regiment was amalgamated with the 66th Light Anti-Aircraft Regiment, RCA, and the 62nd Anti-Tank Battery (Self-Propelled), RCA, retaining its designation.

The 66th Light Anti-Aircraft Regiment, RCA originated in Nanaimo, British Columbia, on 1 August 1930, when the 2nd Battalion, The Canadian Scottish Regiment, was authorized to be formed. On 15 December 1936, it was amalgamated with A Company, 11th Machine Gun Battalion, CMGC, and redesignated the 2nd Battalion (Machine Gun), The Canadian Scottish Regiment. On 1 April 1946, it was converted to artillery and redesignated the 66th Light Anti-Aircraft Regiment (Canadian Scottish Regiment), RCA. On 31 December 1954, it was amalgamated with The Canadian Scottish Regiment (Princess Mary's) and the 62nd Anti-Tank Battery, RCA.

The 62nd Anti-Tank Battery (Self-Propelled), RCA, originated in Duncan, British Columbia, on 2 February 1920, when the 62nd Field Battery (Howitzer), CFA, was formed. It was redesignated the 62nd Field Battery, CA, on 1 July 1925, the 62nd Field Battery (Howitzer), RCA, on 3 June 1935, the 62nd (Reserve) Field Battery (Howitzer), RCA, on 7 November 1940 and the 62nd Anti-Tank Battery (Self-Propelled), RCA, on 1 April 1946. On 31 December 1954, it was amalgamated with The Canadian Scottish Regiment (Princess Mary's) and the 66th Light Anti-Aircraft Regiment (Canadian Scottish Regiment), RCA.

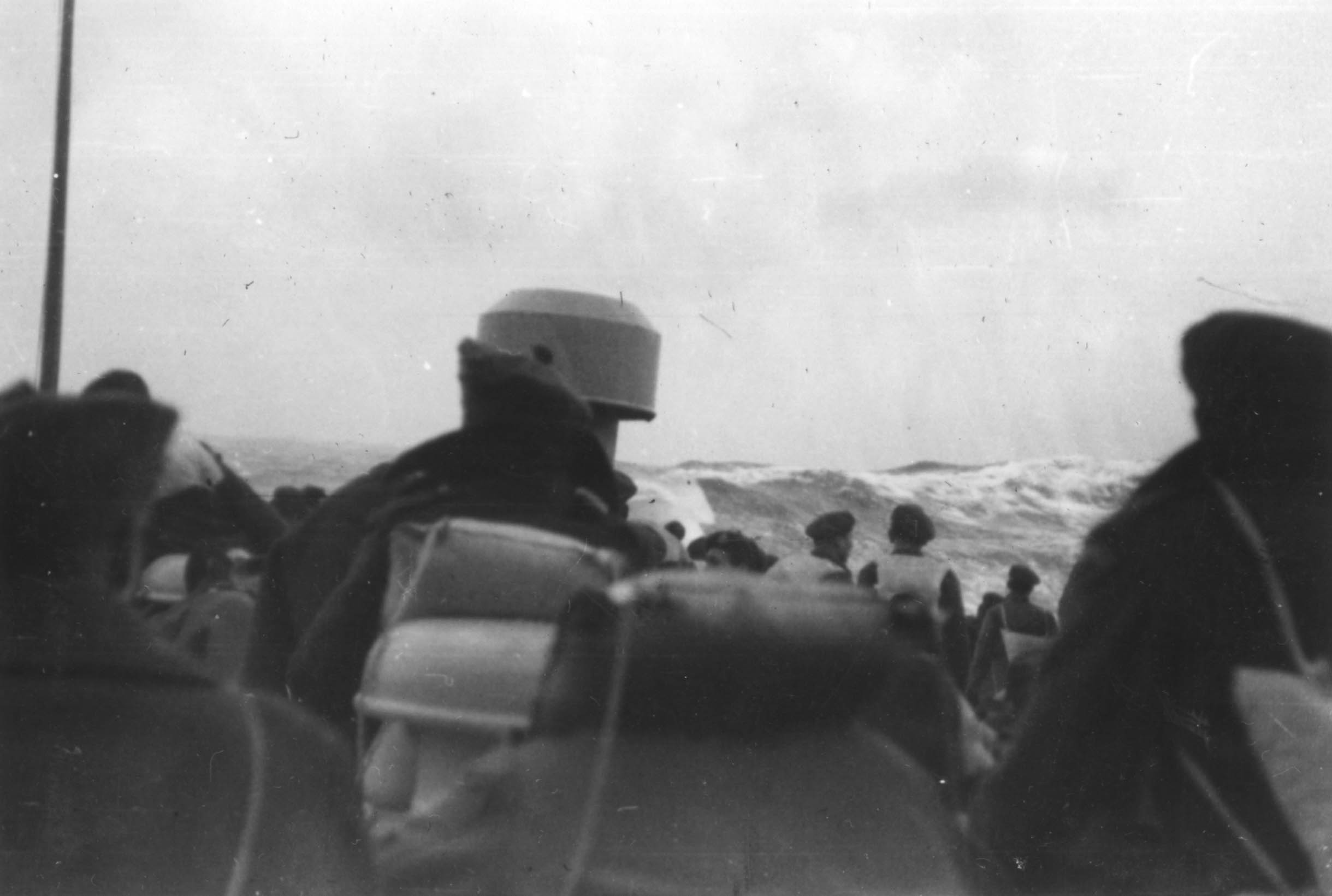
Photograph by Private Floyd Watkins, 1st Battalion C Scot R, 1940

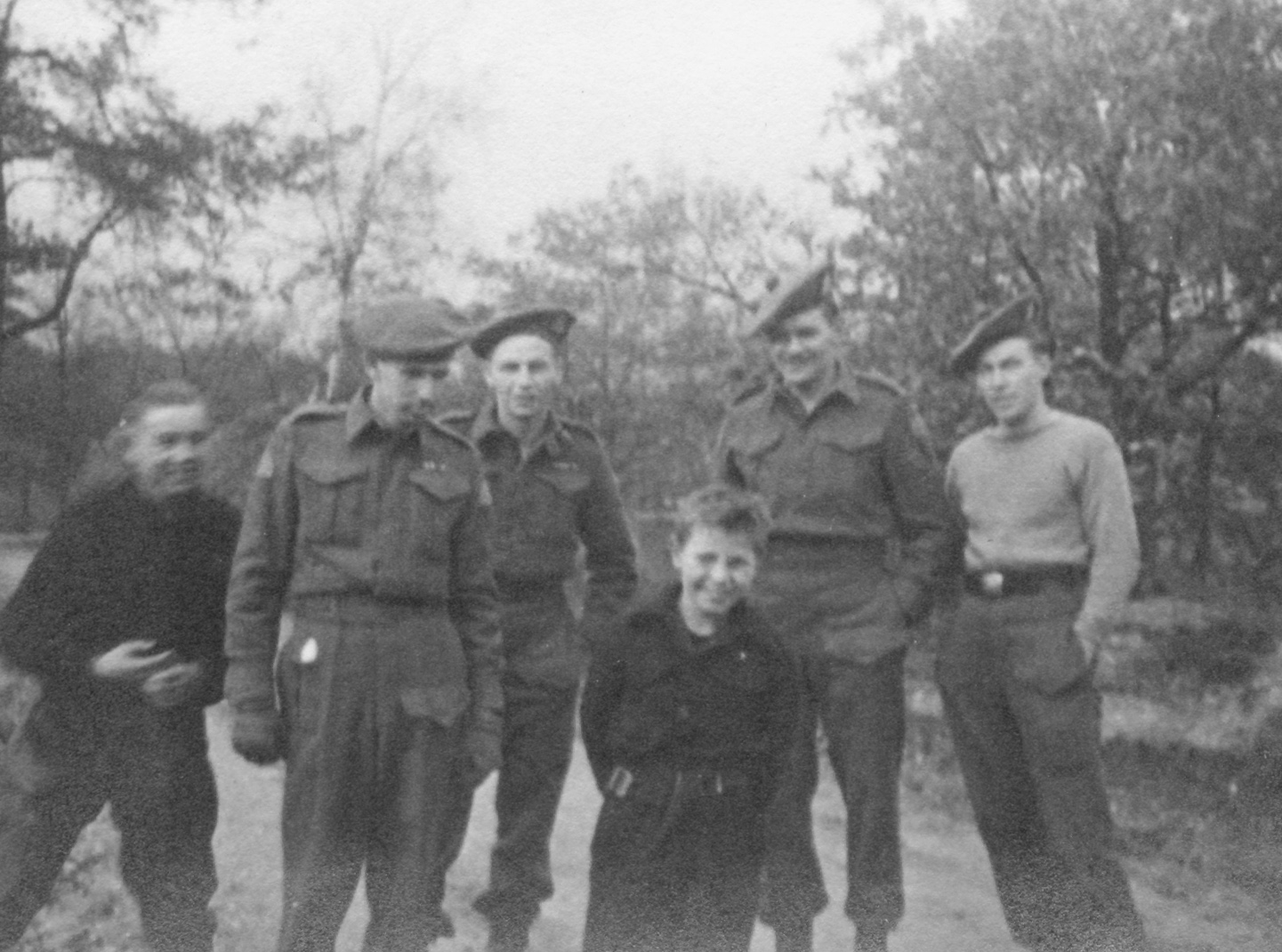
Photograph by Private Watkins, Nijmegen, fall 1945

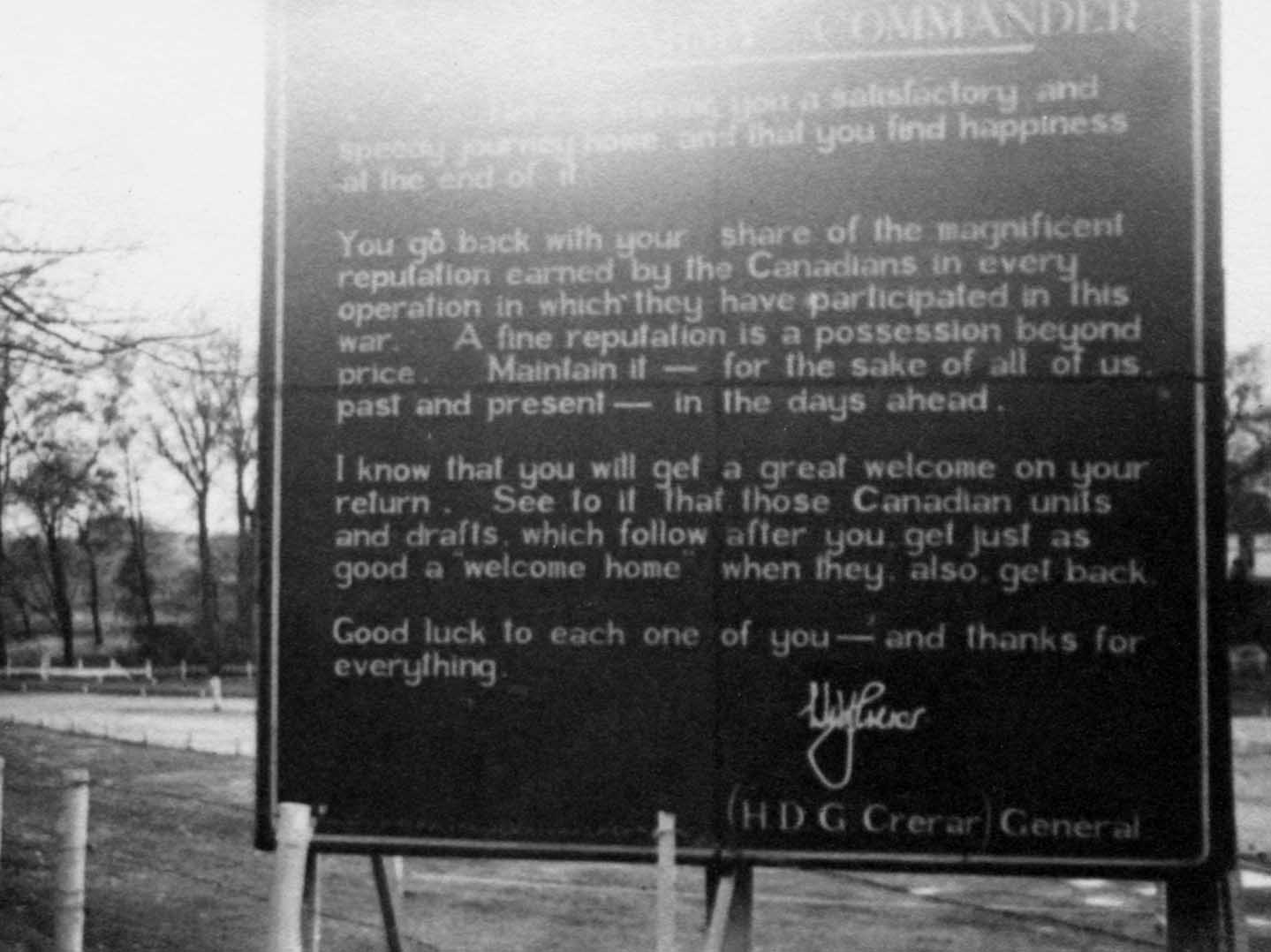
Photograph by Private Watkins, 1945, the Netherlands

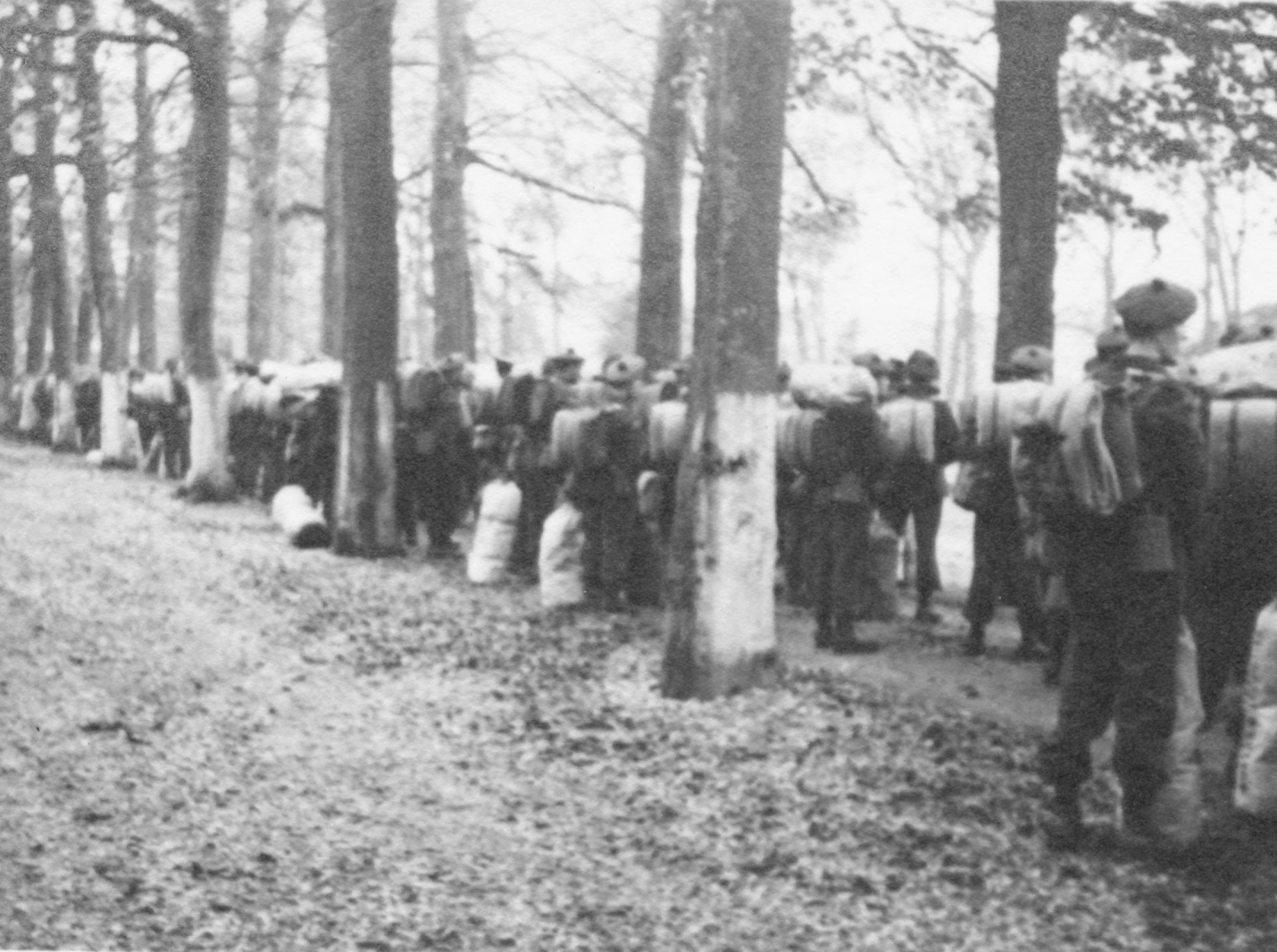
Photograph by Private Watkins, Nijmegen, fall 1945

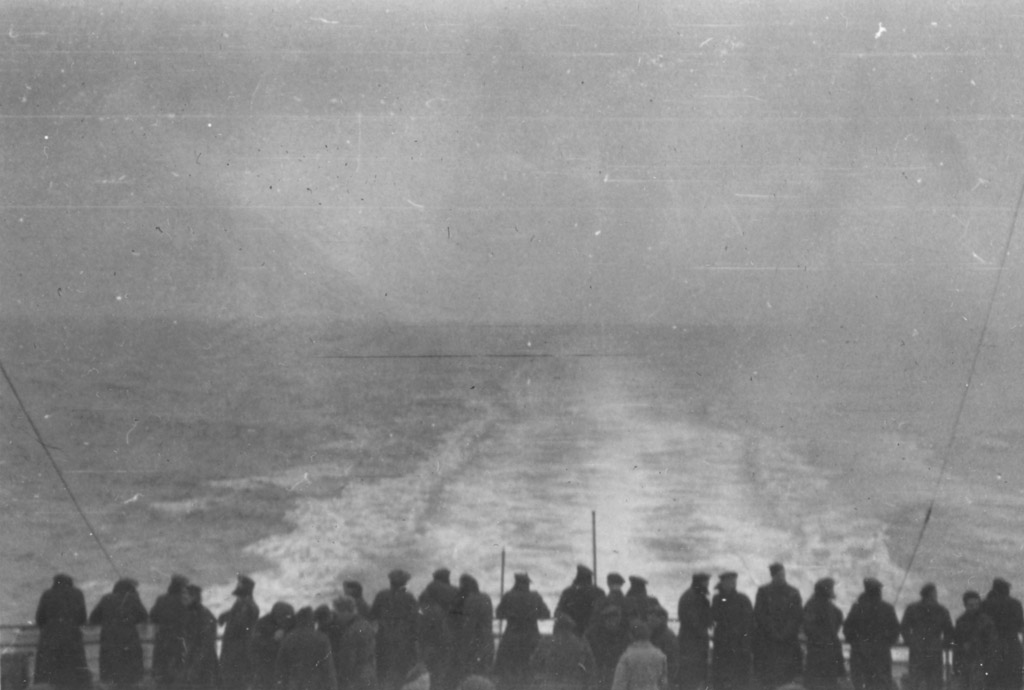
Photograph by Private Watkins; leaving Europe c. 1945 on board RMS Queen Elizabeth

== Armoury ==
Site	Date(s)	Designated	Description	Image
Gen A.W. Currie Armoury; Victoria; 48°26′6.75″N 123°21′50.16″W	1912-15 (completed)	1989 National Historic Sites of Canada; Recognized - 1991 Register of the Government of Canada Heritage Buildings	Housing the headquarters of 5th (BC) Field Regiment, RCA and The Canadian Scottish Regiment (Princess Mary's) Administration and A Company, this large fortress-like structure of brick, steel and concrete features towers, crenellated turrets, and detailing with Tudor Revival elements. Built between 1912 and 1915, it reflects the period after the Second Boer War when over 100 drill halls and armouries were erected across Canada.	

== Canadian Scottish Regiment (Princess Mary’s) Regimental Museum ==
Canadian Scottish Regiment (Princess Mary’s) Regimental Museum
- Established: by Her Royal Highness Princess Alexandra, GCVO, CD, in May 1980.
- Location: Bay Street Armoury, Room 315, 715 Bay Street, Victoria, British Columbia Canada
- Coordinates: 48.4352°N 123.3639°W
- Type: Regimental Museum
- Director: Randy Evans
- Curator: Jack Drysdale
- Website: Regimental Museum

The Museum presents, researches and preserves items of historic significance to the regiment and to the Infantry Branch. The artifacts assist military historians and serve as a training aid to teach regimental history. (48.4352°N 123.3639°W), with displays of weapons, uniforms, medals and other items. The museum features a collection of small arms and regimental artifacts. The Museum is open in June, July and August on Tuesdays to Fridays from 10am to 4pm. From September to May the Museum is open on Tuesdays from 10am to 2pm.

The museum is affiliated with: CMA, CHIN, OMMC, BCMA, GVMMWG, and Virtual Museum of Canada.

== Freedom of the City ==
The Freedom of the City was exercised by the Canadian Scottish Regiment (Princess Mary's) in Victoria, British Columbia on June 6, 1964, and in 2012. A brass plaque on the south face of the British Columbia Maritime Museum in Victoria, B.C. commemorates the granting of this honour. It was also exercised in Nanaimo, British Columbia on October 5, 1974; May 20, 1990 and September 16, 2012.

== Cadet Corps ==
Three Royal Canadian Army Cadets corps on Vancouver Island are affiliated to The Canadian Scottish Regiment (Princess Mary's).

Corps	Location
1726 RCACC	Comox
2136 RCACC	Victoria
2422 RCACC	Nanaimo

Cadet Corps affiliated to the Canadian Scottish are entitled to wear traditional regimental accoutrements on their uniforms and receive moderate support from the regiment and its association.

2308 RCACC, once located in Port Alberni, disbanded at some point between 2017 (when it was last mentioned in Regional Routine Orders) and 2023. The corps is still remembered in spirit through the annual 'four corps' gathering held on every Victoria Day weekend.

== Alliances ==
- United Kingdom - The Royal Regiment of Scotland (6 SCOTS)

== Media ==
- Ready for the Fray (DEAS GU CATH): The History of the Canadian Scottish Regiment (Princess Mary's) 1920 to 1955 by Roy, Reginald H.; Grubb, David McClintock (1958)
- Brave Battalion: The Remarkable Saga of the 16th Battalion (Canadian Scottish) in the First World War by Mark Zuehlke (Nov 5 2013)

== See also ==
- Canadian-Scottish regiment
- The Canadian Crown and the Canadian Forces
- List of Canadian organizations with royal patronage
- Military history of Canada
- History of the Canadian Army
- Canadian Forces
- List of armouries in Canada

== Order of precedence ==
Preceded by The Seaforth Highlanders of Canada	The Canadian Scottish Regiment (Princess Mary's)	Succeeded by The Royal Montreal Regiment
