= 16th Battalion (Canadian Scottish), CEF =

Military unit during WWI (1914–1920)

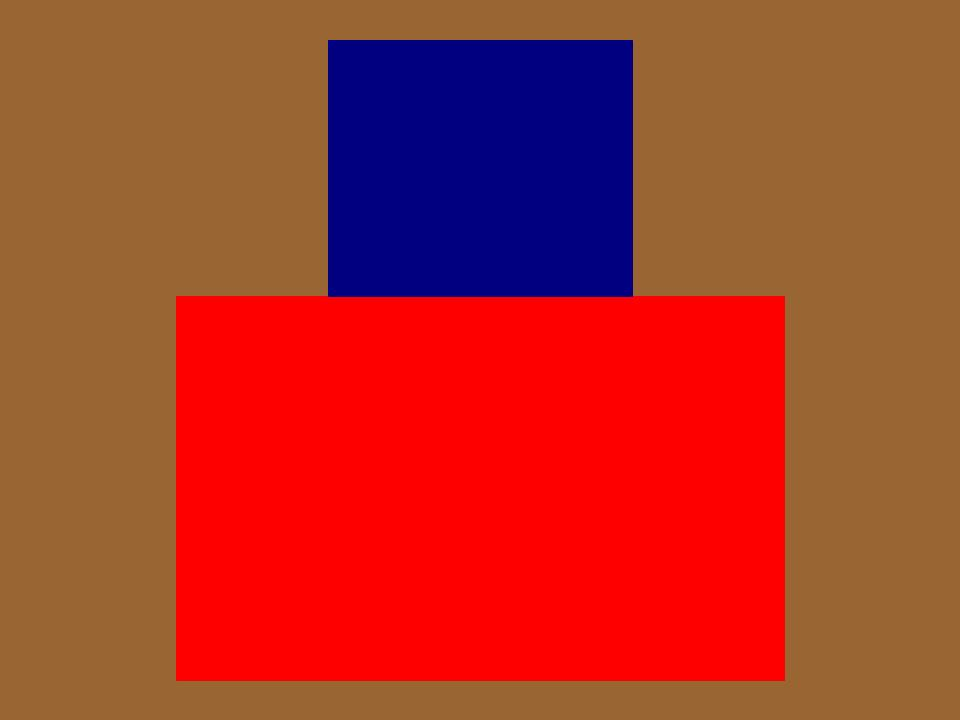
- Distinguishing patch
- Active: 1914–1920
- Disbanded: 1920
- Country: Canada
- Branch: Canadian Expeditionary Force
- Type: Infantry
- Part of: 3rd Brigade, CEF
- Battle honours: Ypres, 1915, '17; Gravenstafel; St Julien; Festubert, 1915; Mount Sorrel; Somme, 1916; Pozières; Theipval; Ancre Heights; Arras, 1917, '18; Vimy, 1917; Arleux; Scarpe, 1917, '18; Hill 70; Passchendaele; Amiens; Drocourt–Quéant; Hindenburg Line; Canal du Nord; Pursuit to Mons; France and Flanders, 1915-18

Commanders
- Notable commanders: LCol Cyrus Wesley Peck

The 16th Battalion (Canadian Scottish), CEF was a unit of the First World War Canadian Expeditionary Force. It was organized at Valcartier on 2 September 1914 and was composed of recruits from the 91st Regiment Canadian Highlanders, the 79th Cameron Highlanders of Canada, the 72nd Regiment "Seaforth Highlanders of Canada", and the 50th Regiment "Highlanders".

== History ==
The 16th Battalion served in the 3rd Canadian Brigade of the 1st Canadian Division. Since its early beginnings, the battalion had a high standard of conduct on the battlefield and was commanded by outstanding leaders. One such was Lieutenant-General Sir Arthur Currie, KCMG, who rose to command the Canadian Corps during the Great War. Currie was a master tactician whose skills led the Canadians to victory at Vimy Ridge and Amiens. Lieutenant-Colonel Cyrus Wesley Peck commanded the battalion for many months in the trenches.

Four members of the 16th Battalion were awarded the Victoria Cross: Piper James Cleland Richardson, Private William Johnstone Milne, Lance-Corporal William Henry Metcalf, and Lieutenant-Colonel Cyrus Peck. Piper James Richardson was just 18 years old when he enlisted, and was killed during the Battle of the Somme shortly after having played his company through No Man's Land. He disappeared in shellfire after going back to retrieve the bagpipes he laid aside to bring back a wounded comrade.

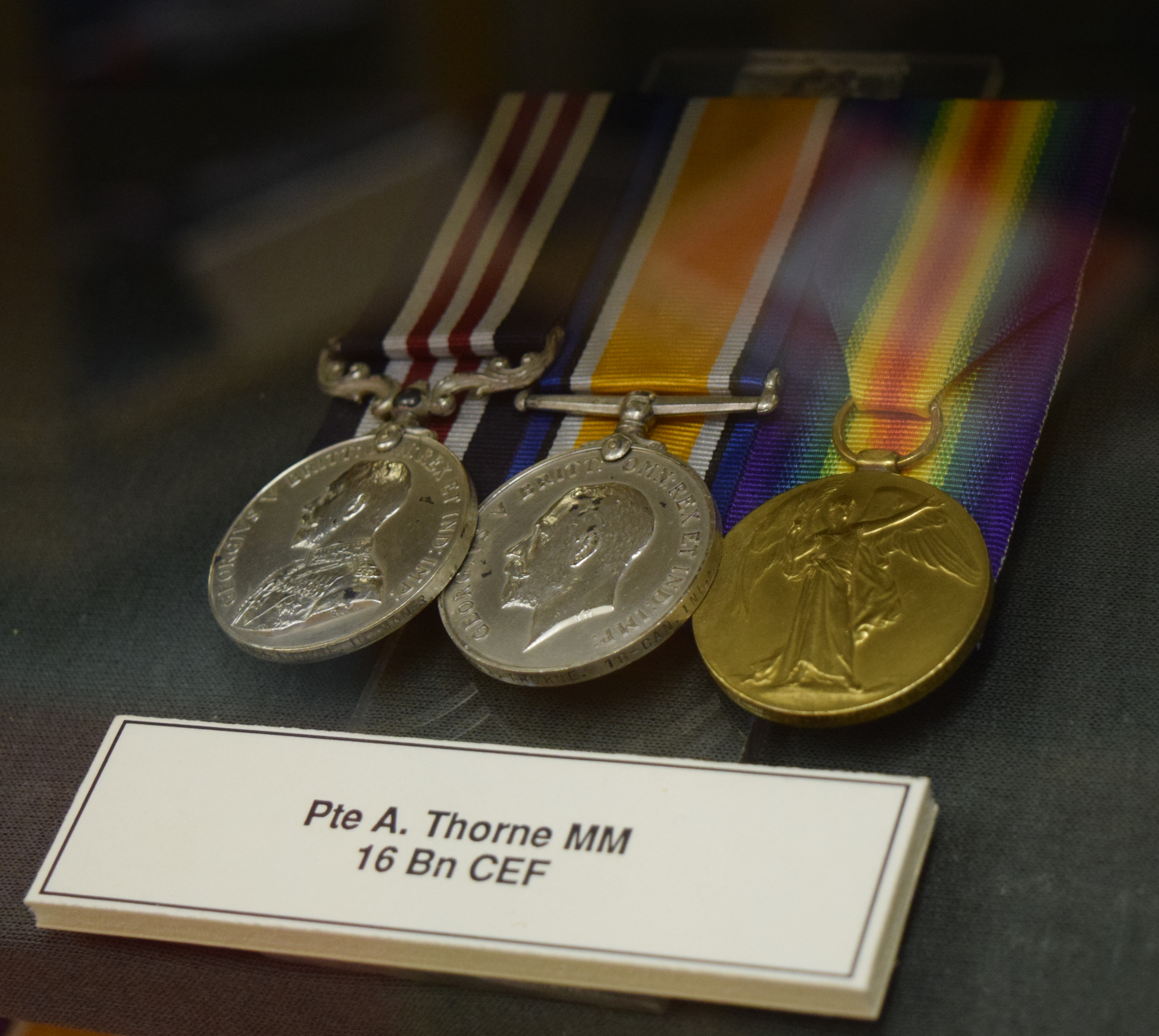
Medals of a soldier in the battalion

The battalion fought on the northern flank of the 3rd Brigade during the attack on Vimy Ridge. Several German positions survived the pre-attack artillery barrage and, though the 16th achieved its objectives, it paid a heavy price with 333 killed and wounded.

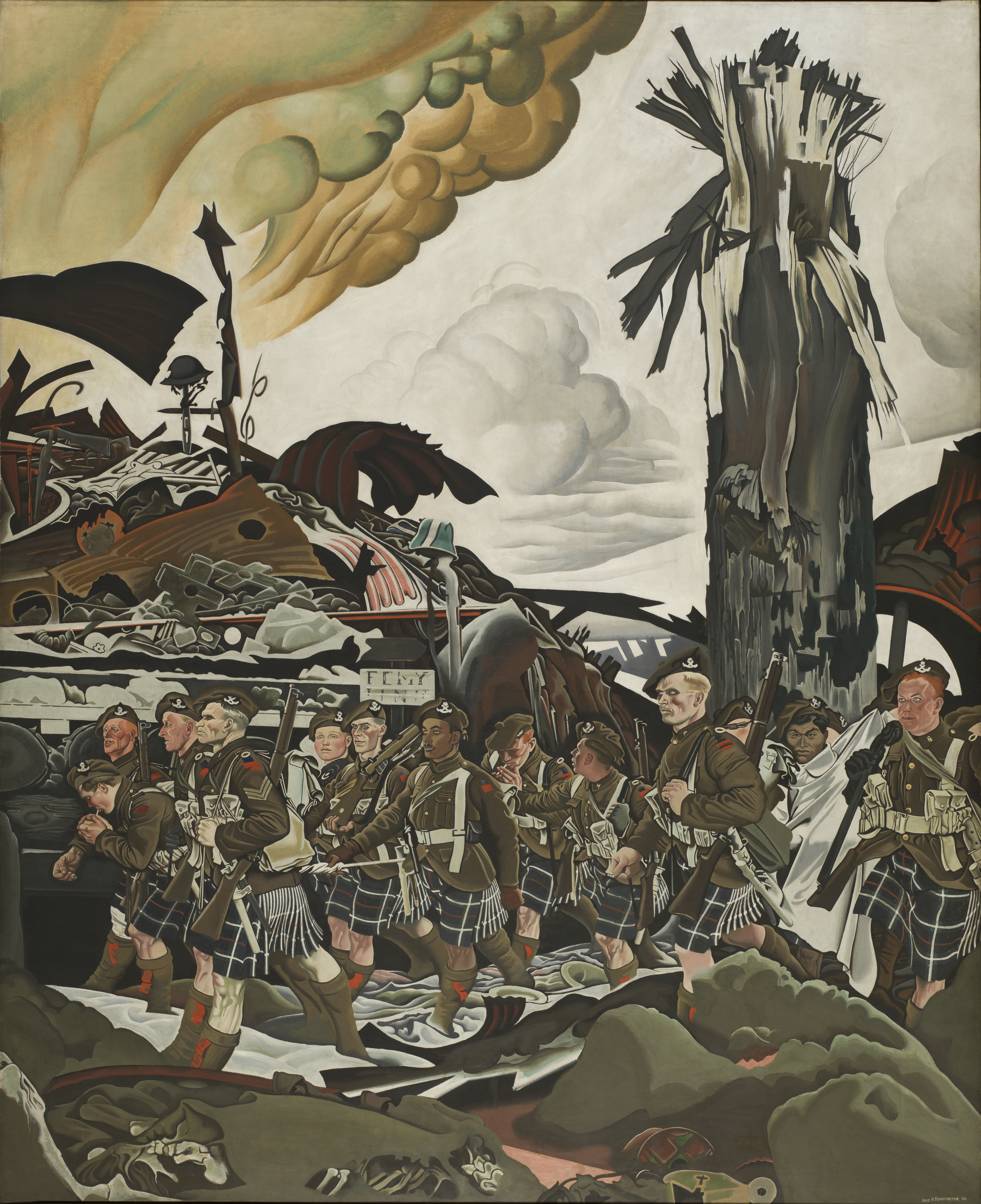
The Conquerors by Eric Kennington; originally titled The Victims it was renamed after objections from the battalion's commanding officer, Lieutenant-Colonel Cy Peck.

The Canadian historian René Chartrand noted that despite the fact that black Canadians were only supposed to serve in construction units, one of the soldiers in the painting The Conquerors is a black man, suggesting that at least some black Canadians served as infantrymen in World War I.

The battalion returned to England on 27 March 1919, disembarked in Canada on 4 May 1919, was demobilized on 8 May 1919, and was disbanded by General Order 149 of 15 September 1920.

== Perpetuations ==
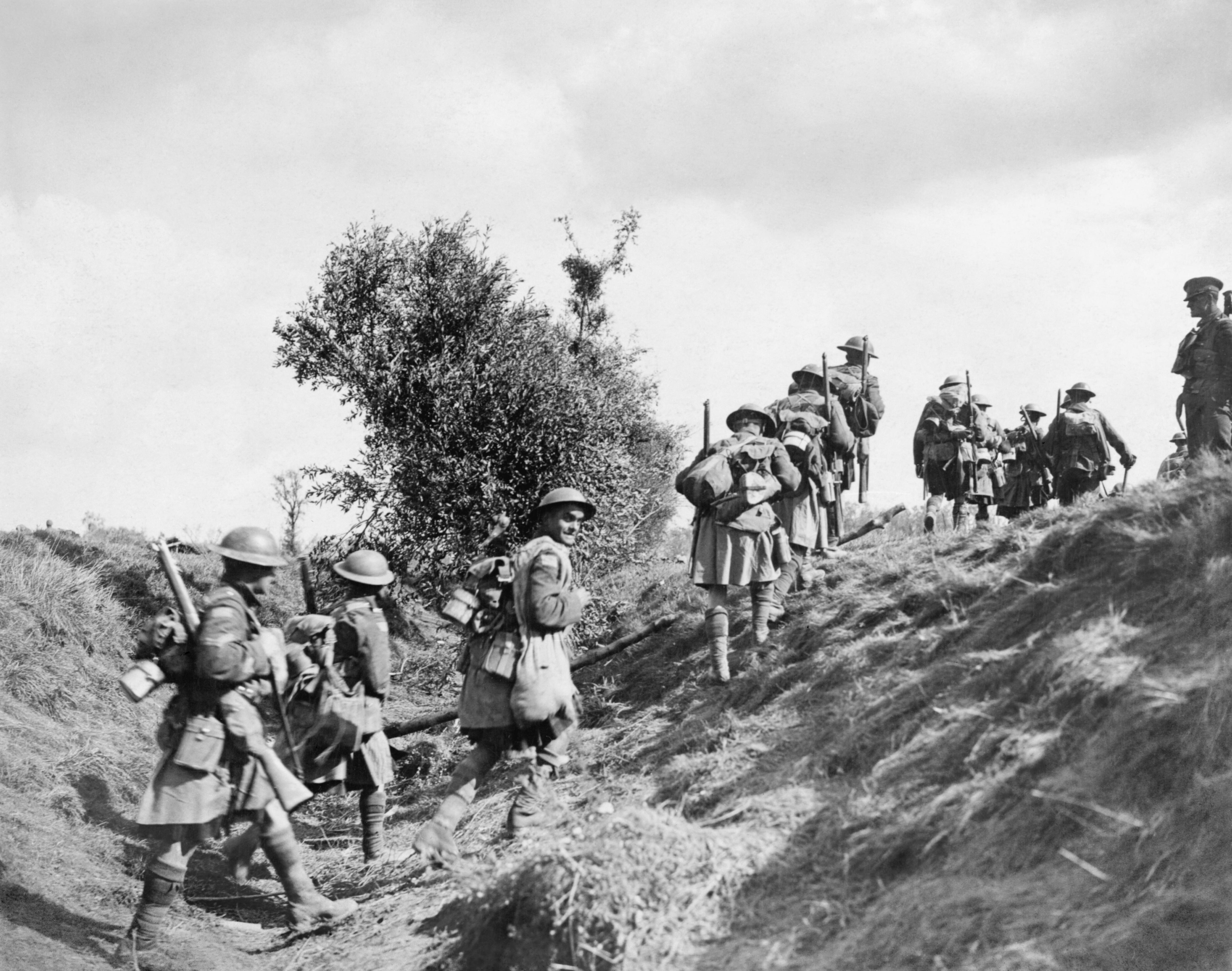
Canadian Scottish advancing near Inchy during the Battle of the Canal du Nord, 27 September 1918

The 16th Battalion (Canadian Scottish), CEF is perpetuated by The Canadian Scottish Regiment (Princess Mary's).

== Battle honours ==
- Ypres, 1915, '17
- Gravenstafel
- St Julien
- Festubert, 1915
- Mount Sorrel
- Somme, 1916
- Pozières
- Theipval
- Ancre Heights
- Arras, 1917, '18
- Vimy, 1917
- Arleux
- Scarpe, 1917, '18
- Hill 70
- Passchendaele
- Amiens
- Drocourt–Quéant
- Hindenburg Line
- Canal du Nord
- Pursuit to Mons
- France and Flanders, 1915-18

== See also ==
- List of infantry battalions in the Canadian Expeditionary Force
