= 7th Battalion (1st British Columbia), CEF =

- The distinguishing patch of the 7th Battalion (1st British Columbia), CEF.
- Active: 1914-1919
- Country: Canada
- Branch: Canadian Expeditionary Force
- Role: Infantry
- Size: One Battalion
- Part of: 2nd Canadian Brigade, 1st Canadian Division
- Engagements: First World War
- Battle honours: Ypres and along the Western Front.

The 7th Battalion (1st British Columbia), CEF was a battalion of the Canadian Expeditionary Force that saw service in the First World War.

== History ==
The 7th Battalion (1st British Columbia), CEF was created on 2 September 1914 with recruits from British Columbia. The battalion set off for England on board the Virginian berthed in Quebec. They arrived in England on 14 October 1914 with a strength of 49 officers and 1083 men. The battalion became part of the 1st Canadian Division, 2nd Canadian Infantry Brigade where it saw action along the Western Front. The battalion returned to Canada on 18 April 1919, was demobilized on 25 April 1919, and disbanded soon after.

== Perpetuations ==
The 7th Battalion (1st British Columbia), CEF is perpetuated by The British Columbia Regiment (Duke of Connaught's Own).

== Battle honours ==
- Ypres 1915, 17
- Gravenstafel
- St. Julien
- Festubert, 1915
- Mount Sorrel
- Somme, 1916
- Thiepval
- Ancre Heights
- Arras 1917, '18
- Vimy, 1917
- Arleux
- Hill 70
- Passchendaele
- Amiens
- Scarpe, 1918
- Drocourt-Quéant
- Hindenburg Line
- Canal du Nord
- Pursuit to Mons
- France and Flanders, 1915-18

== Notable people ==
- Victor Odlum
- Walter Leigh Rayfield

== See also ==
- List of infantry battalions in the Canadian Expeditionary Force
