= 48th Battalion (British Columbia), CEF =

Canadian infantry battalion

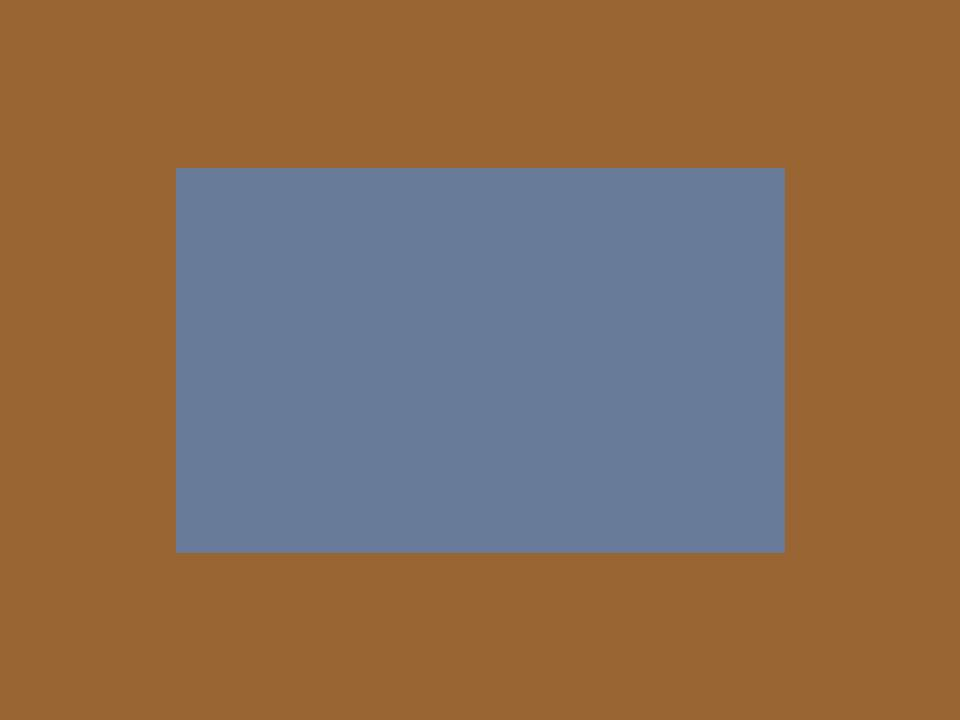
The distinguishing patch of the 3rd Canadian Division, as worn by the 3rd Pioneer Battalion, CEF.

The 48th Battalion (British Columbia), CEF, was an infantry battalion of the Canadian Expeditionary Force during the Great War.

== History ==
The 48th Battalion was authorized on 7 November 1914 and embarked for Britain on 1 July 1915. It was converted to pioneers and redesignated the 3rd Canadian Pioneer Battalion, CEF on 6 January 1916. It disembarked in France on 9 March 1916, where it served as part of the 3rd Canadian Division in France and Flanders until 17 April 1917, when its personnel were absorbed by the Canadian Corps in the field. The battalion was disbanded on 30 August 1920.

The 48th Battalion recruited throughout British Columbia and was mobilized at Victoria.

The 48th Battalion and 3rd Pioneer Battalion were commanded by Lt.-Col. W.J.H. Holmes, DSO, from 1 July 1915 to 31 May 1917.

== Battle honours ==
The 48th Battalion was awarded the following battle honours:

- MOUNT SORREL
- SOMME, 1916
- Flers-Courcelette
- Thiepval
- Ancre Heights
- ARRAS, 1917, '18
- Vimy, 1917
- FRANCE AND FLANDERS, 1916-17

== Perpetuation ==
The 48th Battalion (British Columbia), CEF, is perpetuated by The Canadian Scottish Regiment (Princess Mary's).

== See also ==
- List of infantry battalions in the Canadian Expeditionary Force

== Sources ==
- Canadian Expeditionary Force 1914-1919 by Col. G.W.L. Nicholson, CD, Queen's Printer, Ottawa, Ontario, 1962
