= 103rd Battalion, CEF =

Former Infantry Battalion

The 103rd Battalion, CEF, was an infantry battalion of the Great War Canadian Expeditionary Force. The 103rd Battalion was authorized on 22 December 1915 and embarked for Britain on 23 July 1916 aboard HMT Olympic. There, it provided reinforcements for the Canadian Corps in the field until 7 January 1917, when its personnel were absorbed by the 16th Reserve Battalion, CEF. The battalion disbanded on 1 September 1917.

The 103rd Battalion recruited in, and was mobilized at, Victoria, British Columbia.

The 103rd Battalion was commanded by Lt.-Col. E.C.J. Henniker from 23 July 1916 to 7 November 1916.

The 103rd Battalion was awarded the battle honour THE GREAT WAR 1916-17.

The 103rd Battalion, CEF, is perpetuated by The Canadian Scottish Regiment (Princess Mary's).

== Sources ==
Canadian Expeditionary Force 1914–1919 by Col. G.W.L. Nicholson, CD, Queen's Printer, Ottawa, Ontario, 1962
