= 67th Battalion (Western Scots), CEF =

Canadian infantry battalion

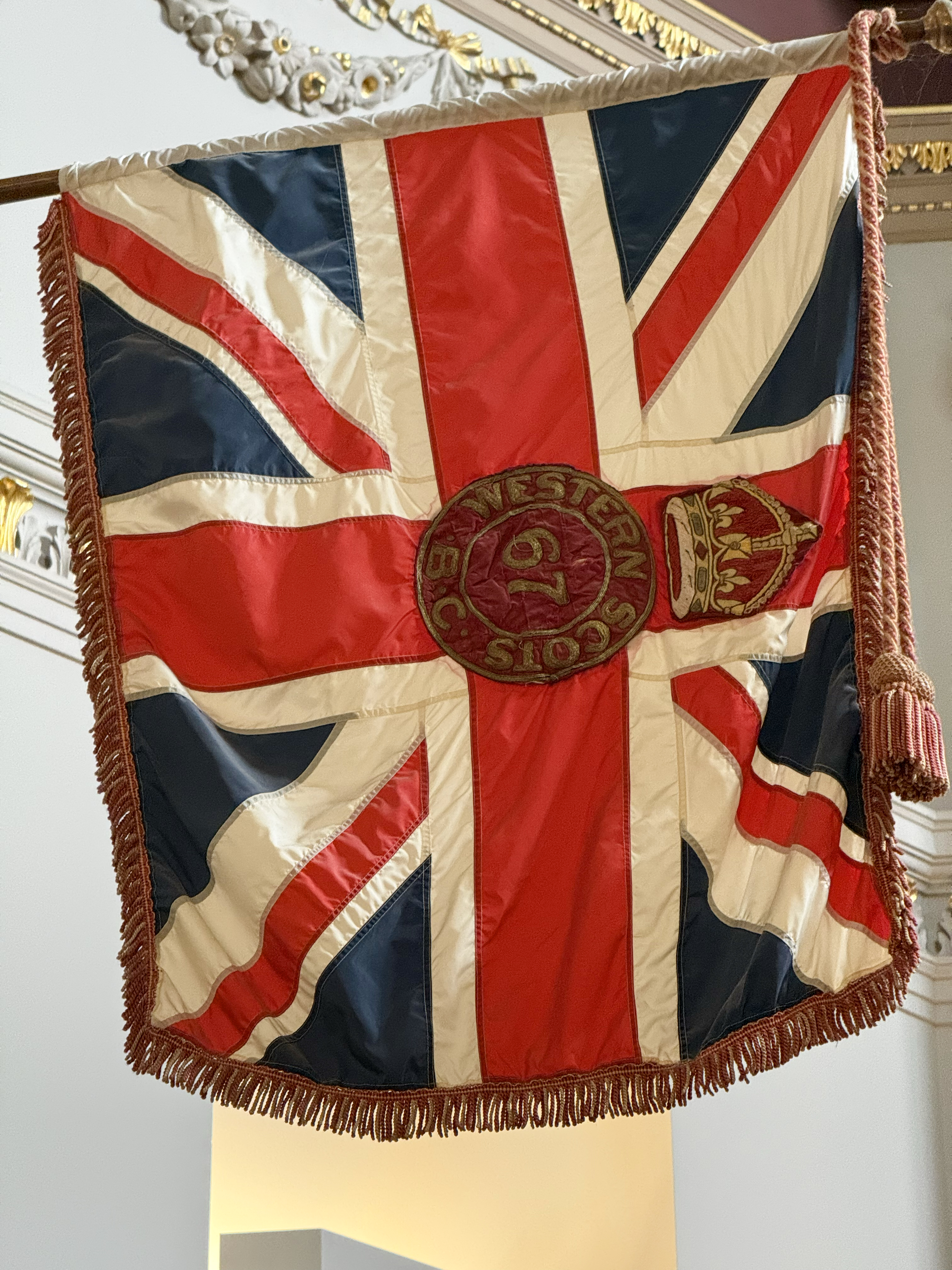
Regimental Flag in the British Columbia Parliament Buildings

The 67th Battalion (Western Scots), CEF was an infantry battalion of the Canadian Expeditionary Force during the Great War which was converted to a pioneer battalion. The 67th Battalion was authorized on 20 April 1915 and embarked for Britain on 1 April 1916. It was converted to pioneer and redesignated the 67th Canadian (Pioneer) Battalion, CEF on 15 May 1916. It disembarked in France on 14 August 1916, where it served as part of the 4th Canadian Division in France and Flanders until 28 April 1917, when its personnel were absorbed by the Canadian Corps in the field. The battalion was disbanded on 30 August 1920.

The 67th Battalion recruited in and was mobilized at Victoria, B.C.

The 67th Battalion was commanded by Lt.-Col. Lorne Ross, DSO, from 2 April 1916 to 30 April 1917.

The 67th Battalion was awarded the following battle honours:

- SOMME, 1916
- Ancre Heights
- Ancre, 1916
- ARRAS, 1917
- Vimy, 1917
- Arleux
- FRANCE AND FLANDERS, 1916-17
- THE GREAT WAR 1916.

The 67th Battalion (Western Scots), CEF is perpetuated by The Canadian Scottish Regiment (Princess Mary's). The 67th Battalion Colour is laid up in the rotunda of the British Columbia Legislature.

== Sources ==
- Canadian Expeditionary Force 1914-1919 by Col. G.W.L. Nicholson, CD, Queen's Printer, Ottawa, Ontario, 1962
