= Cyrus Wesley Peck =

Canadian Victoria Cross recipient (1871-1956)

Cyrus Wesley Peck VC DSO & Bar
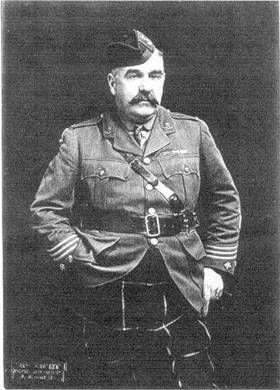
- Colonel Cyrus Peck
- Born: 26 April 1871; Hopewell Hill, New Brunswick, Canada
- Died: 27 September 1956 (aged 85); Vancouver, British Columbia, Canada
- Military career
- Allegiance: Canada
- Branch: Canadian Militia; Canadian Expeditionary Force
- Service years: 1880s – 1918; 1942 – 1945
- Rank: Private; Sergeant; Major; Lieutenant-Colonel
- Units: 5th British Columbia Garrison Artillery (1880s); 43rd Ottawa and Carleton Rifles (1894-96); 6th Duke of Connaught's Own Rifles (1900); 30th Battalion, CEF (1914); 16th (Canadian Scottish) Battalion, CEF (1915-18)
- Commands: 68th Earl Grey’s Own Rifles (1914); 16th Battalion (Canadian Scottish), CEF (1916-18); Vancouver Division, Pacific Coast Militia Rangers (1942-45)
- Conflicts: World War I; Second Battle of Ypres; Battle of the Somme; Battle of the Ancre Heights; Battle of Vimy Ridge; Battle of Hill 70; Battle of Passchendaele (WIA); Battle of Amiens; Battle of Drocourt-Quéant Line; Battle of the Canal du Nord; World War II; Pacific theatre
- Awards: Victoria Cross; Distinguished Service Order & Bar; Mentioned in Despatches (5)
- Other work: Politician

Member of the Legislative Assembly of British Columbia
- In office 1924–1933
- Preceded by: Malcolm Bruce Jackson
- Succeeded by: Alexander McDonald
- Constituency: The Islands

Personal details
- Party: Conservative Party of British Columbia

Cyrus Wesley Peck VC, DSO & Bar (26 April 1871 – 27 September 1956) was a Canadian recipient of the Victoria Cross, the highest award for gallantry in the face of the enemy that can be awarded to British and Commonwealth forces.

Peck was one of the seven Canadians to be awarded the Victoria Cross for their actions on one single day, 2 September 1918, for actions across the 30 km long Drocourt-Quéant Line near Arras, France. The other six were Bellenden Hutcheson, Arthur George Knight, William Metcalf, Claude Joseph Patrick Nunney, Walter Leigh Rayfield and John Francis Young. Cyrus Wesley Peck stood 5 feet 8 inches (or 5 feet 9 inches) tall and weighed 225 pounds, he was a big big fellow.

== Early life ==
Cyrus Wesley Peck was born in Hopewell Hill, New Brunswick to a family that had emigrated from New England in 1763. His puritan ancestors include the Peck and Brewster families.

Peck was 16 years old when his father moved the family to New Westminster, British Columbia.

== Militia ==
Peck joined the Canadian Militia in the late 1880s, serving with the 5th British Columbia Garrison Artillery. In the mid-1890s, he travelled to Ontario and lived there for several years.

In 1894, Peck enlisted as a private in the 43rd Ottawa and Carleton Rifles in Ottawa. He attended the militia training and instructional courses in Levis and Toronto, and was promoted to Sergeant and musketry instructor in 1896. In late 1896 he travelled to England to join the British Army but was not selected for service and he returned home to Canada. He travelled to BC and in 1900 joined the 6th Duke of Connaught's Own Rifles, but soon left to move for the Klondike. He and his cousin opened a canning business in Port Essington, near the Skeena River, in 1903. He later moved to Prince Rupert and worked in a salmon cannery.

In 1914, he helped raise the 68th Earl Grey’s Own Rifles and served as Colonel of the regiment.

== First World War ==
He went overseas in 1914 as a Major in the 30th Battalion. Then in May 1915 Peck joined as a lieutenant colonel in the 16th (Canadian Scottish) Battalion, Canadian Expeditionary Force. He was 44 years old. He became the commanding officer of the Regiment during the Battle of the Somme (1916). Peck was awarded the Distinguished Service Order (DSO) in the 1917 King's Birthday Honours; a Bar to the DSO, for which the citation in the London Gazette read, "During an attack he showed fine courage and leadership. He led his battalion, under difficulties caused by heavy mist, to its final objective, nearly three miles, after severe fighting. He personally led his men in an attack on nests of machine guns protecting the enemy's guns, which he captured. Some of the guns were of 8-inch calibre."; was Mentioned in Despatches five times; and was wounded twice.

On 2 September 1918 at Cagnicourt, France (the Drocourt-Queant Line), when Lieutenant Colonel Peck's command, after capturing the first objective, was held up by enemy machine-gun fire, he went forward and made a personal reconnaissance under very heavy fire. Returning, he reorganized his battalion and pushed them forward. He then went out, under the most intense artillery and machine-gun fire and intercepted the tanks, giving them the necessary directions, pointing out where they were to make for, and thus paving the way for an infantry battalion to push forward. To this battalion he subsequently gave the necessary support. The full citation was published in a supplement to the London Gazette of 12 November 1918 (dated 15 November 1918):

War Office, 15th November, 1918.

His Majesty the KING has been graciously pleased to approve of the award of the Victoria Cross to the undermentioned Officers, Noncommissioned Officers and Men: —

Lt.-Col. Cyrus Wesley Peck, D.S.O., Manitoba R.

For most conspicuous bravery and skilful leading when in attack under intense fire.

His command quickly captured the first objective, but progress to the further objective was held up by enemy machine-gun fire on his right flank.

The situation being critical in the extreme, Colonel Peck pushed forward and made a personal reconnaissance under heavy machine-gun and sniping fire, across a stretch of ground which was heavily swept by fire.

Having reconnoitred the position he returned, reorganised his battalion, and, acting upon the knowledge personally gained; pushed them forward and arranged to protect his flanks. He then went out under the most intense artillery and machine-gun fire, intercepted the Tanks, gave them the necessary directions, pointing out where they were to make for, and thus pave the way for a Canadian Infantry battalion to push forward. To this battalion he subsequently gave requisite support.

His magnificent display of courage and fine qualities of leadership enabled the advance to be continued, although always under heavy artillery and machine-gun fire, and contributed largely to the success of the brigade attack.

== Later life ==
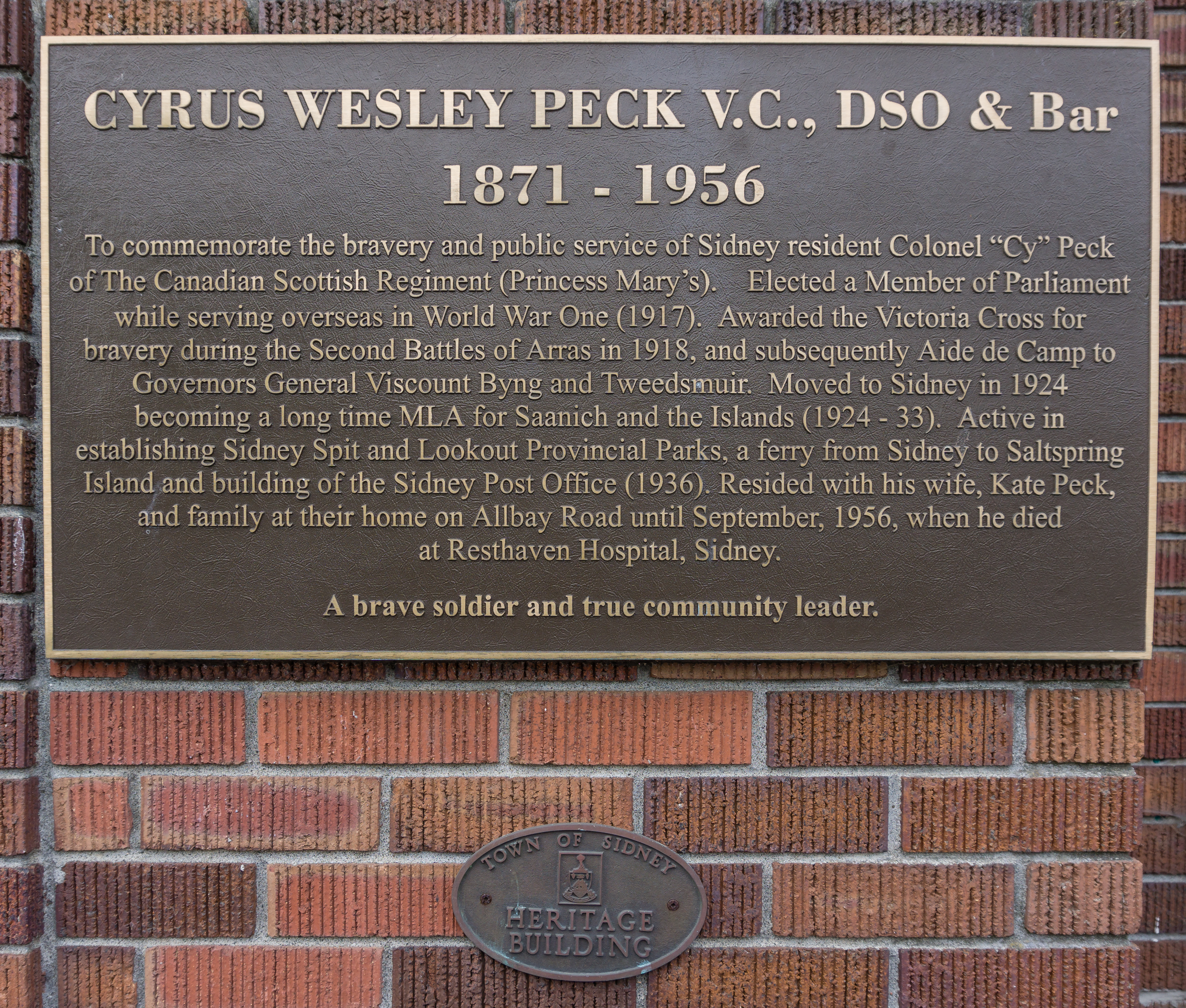
Memorial plaque dedicated to Cyrus Wesley Peck in Sidney, British Columbia

In 1917 he was a soldier candidate elected in the khaki election of 1917. He was elected in 1917 as a Unionist for the riding of Skeena. He was defeated in 1921. In 1924, he was elected to the Legislative Assembly of British Columbia for the riding of The Islands. A member of the British Columbia Conservative Party, he was reelected in 1928. He did not seek a third term in the 1933 provincial election.

In 1930, the Gulf Islands Ferry Company purchased the Canadian Pacific car ferry Island Princess and renamed it MV Cy Peck in honour of Peck, who was also the local MLA. The MV Cy Peck remained in service until 1966.

Following his political career he was appointed to the Canadian Pension Commission and held this post until 1941.

During the Second World War, Peck commanded the Vancouver Island Division of the Pacific Coast Militia Rangers. He served as Lieutenant-Colonel from 1942 to 1945.

He died 27 September 1956 of a heart attack and is buried at New Westminster Crematorium, Vancouver, British Columbia, Canada. His Victoria Cross is displayed at the Canadian War Museum in Ottawa, Ontario, Canada.

A plaque inside the House of Commons, Ottawa, Ontario is dedicated to Lieutenant Colonel Cyrus Wesley Peck.
