= 143rd Battalion (British Columbia Bantams), CEF =

The 143rd (B.C. Bantams) Battalion, CEF was a unit in the Canadian Expeditionary Force during the First World War. Based in Victoria, British Columbia, the unit began recruiting in 1916 throughout Western Canada. Bantam units were organized to recruit men who were shorter than the standard 5-foot-4-inch (163 cm) height required for joining the army. By the time they were fully formed, however, only about half of the men were under that standard height as they could not find enough short men to enlist.

The battalion had barracks at Beacon Hill Park and trained for the months of July through October 1916 at Sidney Camp.

After sailing to England in February 1917, the battalion was absorbed into the 1st and 24th Reserve Battalions, and the Canadian Railway Troops in March 1917. The 143rd (B.C. Bantams) Battalion, CEF had one officer commanding: Lieutenant-Colonel A. B. Powley.
