= Walter Leigh Rayfield =

Canadian Victoria Cross recipient (1881-1949)

Walter Leigh Rayfield VC
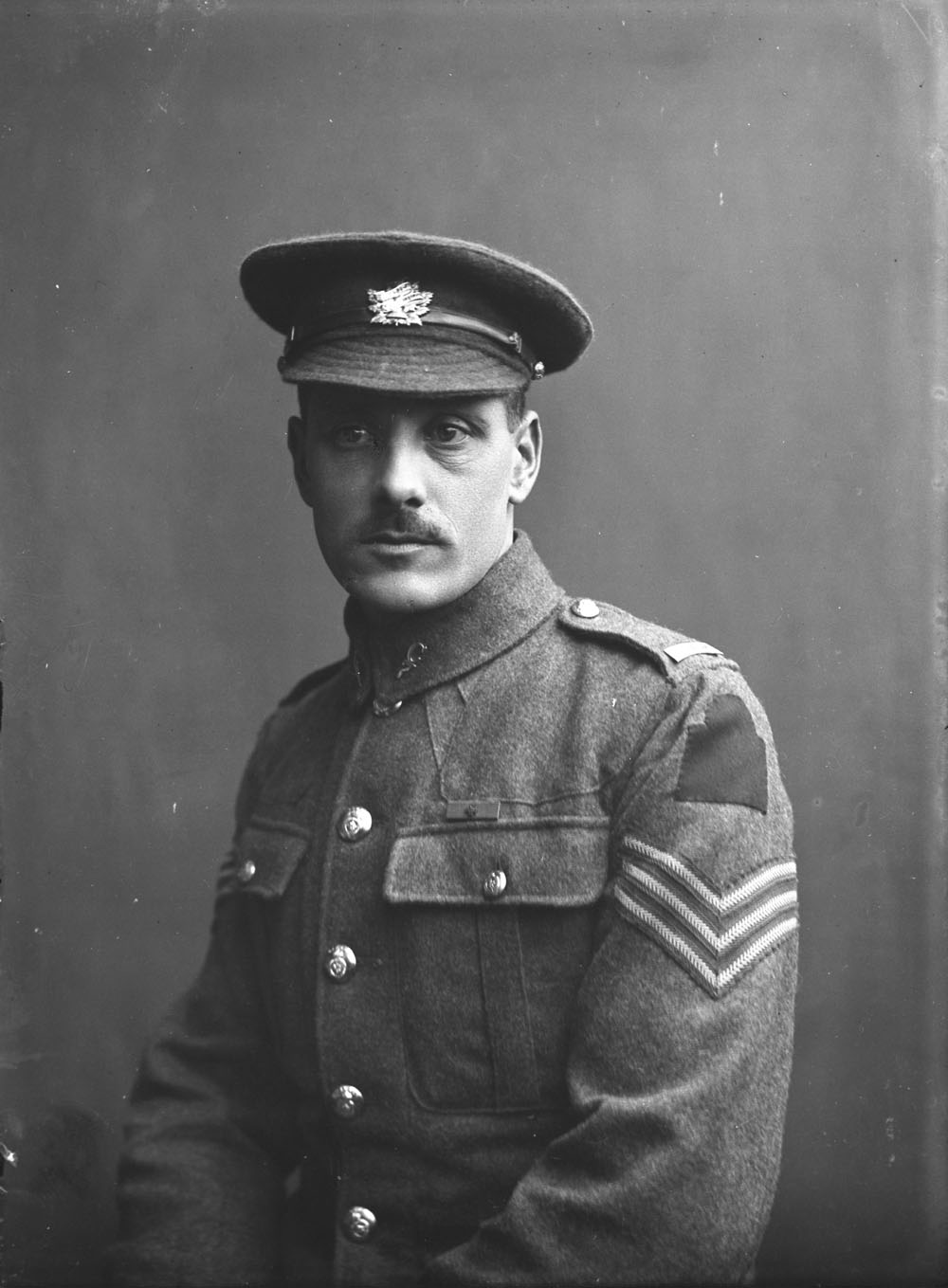
- Rayfield in 1918
- Born: 7 October 1880; Richmond, London, England
- Died: 19 February 1949 (aged 68); Toronto, Ontario, Canada
- Burial place: Prospect Cemetery, Toronto
- Military career
- Allegiance: Canada
- Branch: Canadian Expeditionary Force
- Rank: Captain
- Units: 7th Battalion (1st British Columbia), CEF
- Conflicts: First World War
- Awards: Victoria Cross; Silver Medal of the Order of the Crown (Belgium)
- Other work: Prison Governor; Sergeant-at-Arms

Walter Leigh Rayfield VC (7 October 1880 – 19 February 1949) was a Canadian recipient of the Victoria Cross, the highest award for gallantry in the face of the enemy that can be awarded to British and Commonwealth forces. Rayfield was one of the seven Canadians to be awarded the Victoria Cross for their actions on one single day, 2 September 1918, for actions across the 30 km (19 mi) long Drocourt-Quéant Line near Arras, France. The other six were Bellenden Hutcheson, Arthur George Knight, William Henry Metcalf, Claude Joseph Patrick Nunney, Cyrus Wesley Peck and John Francis Young.

== Details ==
Rayfield was 37 years old, and a private in the 7th (1st British Columbia) Battalion, Canadian Expeditionary Force during the First World War when the following deed took place for which he was awarded the VC.

These events took place from 2–4 September 1918 during the operations east of Arras, France:

Ahead of his company, he rushed a trench occupied by a large party of the enemy, personally bayoneting two and taking ten prisoners. Later, he located and engaged with great skill, under constant rifle fire, an enemy sniper who was causing many casualties. He then rushed the section of trench from which the sniper had been operating, and so demoralised the enemy by his coolness and daring that thirty others surrendered to him. Again, regardless of his personal safety, he left cover under heavy machine-gun fire and carried in a badly wounded comrade.

He was awarded the Silver Medal of the Belgian Order of the Crown on 22 December 1919.

Rayfield was the Progressive Party of Canada "Soldier candidate" in the federal election of 1921 for Toronto East. Liberal nominee Mrs. Philip G. Kiely (Elizabeth Bethune Kiely) stood aside for Rayfield, so that her votes could go to him, but the Conservative candidate won. He was Sergeant-at-Arms of the Legislative Assembly of Ontario and governor of Toronto Jail.

He died in 1949, and is buried at Prospect Cemetery, Toronto, Ontario, Canada (Soldier's Plot, Section 7, grave 4196).

== The Medal ==
His Victoria Cross is displayed at the Canadian War Museum in Ottawa, Ontario, Canada.
