= William Henry Metcalf (VC) =

Recipient of the Victoria Cross

William Henry Metcalf VC MM & Bar
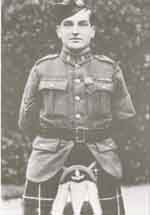
- Born: 29 January 1894; Talmadge, Maine, United States
- Died: 8 August 1968 (aged 74); South Portland, Maine, United States
- Burial place: Bayside Cemetery, Eastport, Maine
- Military career
- Allegiance: Canada
- Branch: Canadian Expeditionary Force
- Rank: Lance Corporal
- Units: 16th Battalion (Canadian Scottish), CEF
- Conflicts: First World War
- Awards: Victoria Cross; Military Medal & Bar

William Henry Metcalf VC, MM & Bar (29 January 1894 – 8 August 1968) was an American soldier in the Canadian Army during World War I. Metcalf was a recipient of the Victoria Cross, the highest award for gallantry in the face of the enemy that can be awarded to British and Commonwealth forces. Although Metcalf was born in the United States, Metcalf is also considered Canadian since he joined the Canadian Expeditionary Force in 1914. He is one of only seven Americans to receive the Victoria Cross.

== Military service ==
Metcalf is one of six Canadian soldiers to be awarded the Victoria Cross on 2 September 1918 for actions across the 30-kilometre-long (19 mi) Drocourt-Quéant Line near Arras, France. The other six are: Bellenden Hutcheson, Arthur George Knight, Claude Joseph Patrick Nunney, Cyrus Wesley Peck, Walter Leigh Rayfield and John Francis Young.

He was 23 years old and a lance corporal in the 16th (Canadian Scottish) Battalion, Canadian Expeditionary Force, during the First World War when he committed the following deed for which he was awarded the Victoria Cross.

On 2 September 1918 at Arras, France, when the right flank of the battalion was held up, Lance Corporal Metcalf rushed forward under intense machine-gun fire to a passing tank and with his signal flag walked in front of the tank directing it along the trench in a perfect hail of bullets and bombs. The machine-gun strongpoint was overcome, very heavy casualties were inflicted and a critical situation was relieved. Later, although wounded, Corporal Metcalf continued to advance until ordered to get into a shell hole and have his wounds dressed.

=== Victoria Cross citation ===
The citation reads:

No. 22614 L./Cpl. William Henry Metcalf, M.M., Manitoba R.

For most conspicuous bravery, initiative and devotion to duty in attack, when, the right flank of the battalion being held up, he realised the situation and rushed forward under intense machine-gun fire to a passing Tank on the left. With his signal flag he walked in front of the Tank, directing it along the trench in a perfect hail of bullets and bombs. The machine-gun strong points were overcome, very heavy casualties were inflicted on the enemy, and a very critical situation was relieved.

Later, although wounded, he continued to advance until ordered to get into a shell hole and have his wounds dressed.

His valour throughout was of the highest standard.

— London Gazette, 15 November 1918.

In addition to the Victoria Cross, he was awarded the Military Medal and Bar.
