= John Francis Young =

Recipient of the Victoria Cross

John Francis Young VC
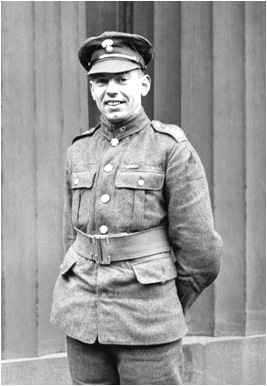
- Born: 14 January 1893; Kidderminster, England
- Died: 7 November 1929 (aged 36); Sainte-Agathe-des-Monts, Quebec
- Burial place: Mount Royal Cemetery, Montreal
- Military career
- Allegiance: Canada
- Branch: Canadian Expeditionary Force
- Rank: Sergeant
- Units: 87th Battalion (Canadian Grenadier Guards), CEF
- Conflicts: First World War
- Awards: Victoria Cross

John Francis Young VC (14 January 1893 – 7 November 1929) was a Canadian soldier who served in the First World War. Young was a recipient of the Victoria Cross, the highest award for gallantry in the face of the enemy that can be awarded to British and Commonwealth forces. Young was one of the seven Canadians who were awarded the Victoria Cross for their actions, on one single day, 2 September 1918, across the 30 km long Drocourt-Quéant Line near Arras, France. The other six were Bellenden Hutcheson, Arthur George Knight, William Metcalf, Claude Joseph Patrick Nunney, Cyrus Wesley Peck and Walter Leigh Rayfield.

== Early life ==
John Francis Young was born in Kidderminster, England on 14 January 1893. He was the son of Robert Charles Young and Mary Ann Cooper. He had two brothers: Robert Peart Young born in 1896 and Reginald H. Young born 1903. He emigrated to Canada before World War I and worked in Montreal as a packer for Imperial Tobacco.

== Victoria Cross ==
John Francis Young was 25 years old, and a private in the 87th (Canadian Grenadier Guards) Battalion, Canadian Expeditionary Force during the First World War when he performed the deed for which he was awarded the Victoria Cross.

On 2 September 1918 in the Dury-Arras Sector, France, when his company had suffered heavy casualties, Private Young, a stretcher-bearer, went forward to dress the wounded in open ground swept by machine-gun and rifle fire. He did this for over an hour displaying absolute fearlessness, and on more than one occasion, having used up all his stock of dressings, he made his way to company headquarters for a further supply before returning to the battlefield. Later in the day he organised and led stretcher-bearers to bring in the wounded whom he had dressed. He spent a full hour rescuing well over a dozen men.

Mustard gas was present in the battle which damaged one of Young's lungs. This later contributed to his contracting tuberculosis.

The citation reads:

His Majesty the KING has been graciously pleased to approve of the award of the Victoria Cross to:–

No. 177239 Pte. John Francis Young, 87th Bn., Quebec R.

For most conspicuous bravery and devotion to duty in attack at Dury-Arras sector on the 2nd September, 1918, when acting as a stretcher-bearer attached to "D" Company of the 87th Bn., Quebec Regiment.

This company in the advance over the ridge suffered heavy casualties from shell and machine-gun fire.

Pte. Young, in spite of the complete absence of cover, without the least hesitation went out, and in the open fire-swept ground dressed the wounded. Having exhausted his stock of dressings, on more than one occasion he returned, under intense fire, to his company headquarters for a further supply. This work he continued for over an hour, displaying throughout the most absolute fearlessness.

To his courageous conduct must be ascribed the saving of the lives of many of his comrades.

Later, when the fire had somewhat slackened, he organised and led stretcher parties to bring in the wounded whom he had dressed.

All through the operations of 2nd, 3rd, and 4th September Pte. Young continued to show the greatest valour and devotion to duty.

— London Gazette, 13 December 1918.

He received his Victoria Cross from King George V at Buckingham Palace on 30 April 1919.

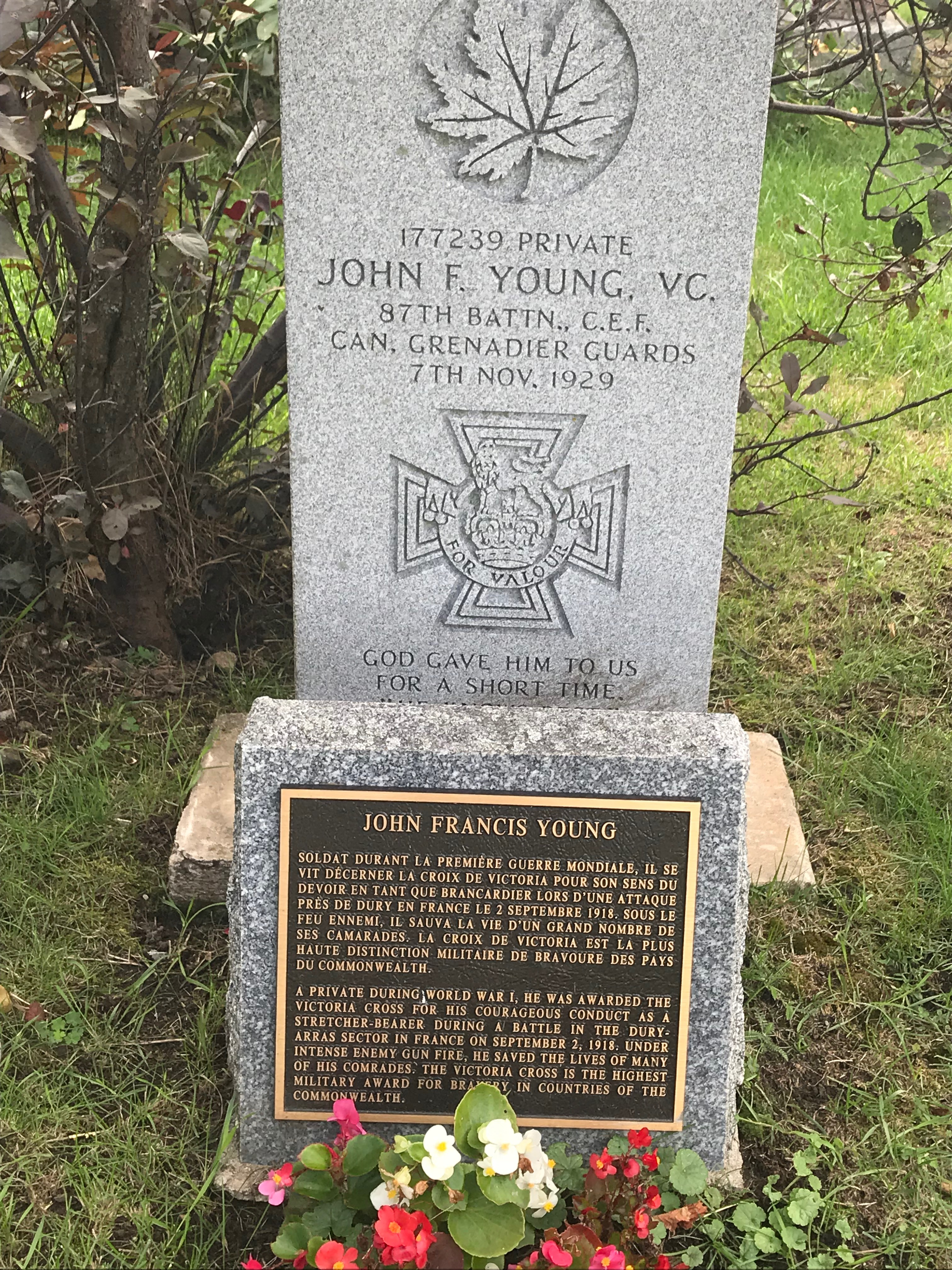
Young's funeral monument and plaque in Mount Royal Cemetery.

== Later life ==
After the war, Young continued to serve in the Regiment, rising to the rank of Sergeant. He subsequently returned to his old job in Montreal. Some years later he developed tuberculosis and was admitted to a sanatorium in Sainte-Agathe-des-Monts, Quebec, where he died on 7 November 1929. He was buried in Mount Royal Cemetery, Montreal. His grave, marked with a somewhat weather-worn headstone, is in Section L/2, plot 2019.

== Legacy ==
The Canadian Grenadier Guards' Junior Ranks mess has been renamed the "John Francis Young Club" in his honour and still bears his name. In Young's honour, members are required to execute a proper halt, briefly coming to attention, upon entering the club. There is a memorial plaque to him in the Sergeants' mess. He is remembered still and honoured as one of the outstanding heroes of the Regiment's history.

== The Medal ==
His VC is held by the Canadian War Museum in Ottawa, Ontario.
