= Arthur George Knight =

English-Canadian soldier

Arthur George Knight VC
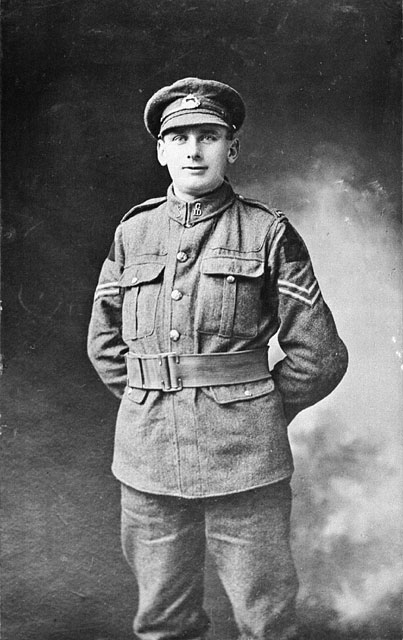
- Arthur George Knight, VC
- Born: 26 June 1886; Haywards Heath, England
- Died: 3 September 1918 (aged 32); Villers-les-Cagnicourt, France
- Burial place: Dominion Cemetery, Hendecourt-les-Cagnicourt
- Military career
- Allegiance: Canada
- Branch: Canadian Expeditionary Force
- Service years: 1914–1918
- Rank: Sergeant
- Unit: 10th Battalion, CEF
- Conflicts: First World War: Western Front; Battle of Drocourt-Quéant Line †
- Awards: Victoria Cross; Croix de Guerre (Belgium)

Arthur George Knight VC (26 June 1886 – 3 September 1918) was an English-Canadian soldier. Knight was a recipient of the Victoria Cross, the highest award for gallantry in the face of the enemy that can be awarded to British and Commonwealth forces. Knight was one of seven Canadian to be awarded the Victoria Cross for their actions on one single day, 2 September 1918, for actions across the 30 km long Drocourt-Quéant Line near Arras, France. The other six recipients were Bellenden Hutcheson, William Henry Metcalf, Claude Joseph Patrick Nunney, Cyrus Wesley Peck, Walter Leigh Rayfield and John Francis Young.

== Details ==
Knight emigrated from England to Canada in 1911 and enlisted in the Canadian Expeditionary Force in December 1914 at Regina, Saskatchewan. In November 1917, Knight was awarded the Croix de Guerre by his Majesty Leopold III, King of the Belgians, for his actions. Knight was 32 years old, and an acting sergeant in the 10th Battalion, CEF during the First World War when the following deed took place for which he was awarded the VC.

On 2 September 1918 at Villers-les-Cagnicourt, France, when a bombing section which he was leading was held up, Sergeant Knight went forward alone, bayoneting several machine-gunners and trench mortar crews, and forcing the rest to retire. Then bringing forward a Lewis gun he directed his fire on the retreating enemy; his platoon went in pursuit and the sergeant, seeing about 30 of the enemy going into a tunnel leading off the trench, again went forward alone, killing an officer and two NCOs and taking 20 prisoners. After this, again single-handed, he routed another hostile party. Later he was fatally wounded.

== Further information ==
Knight is buried at Dominion Cemetery in Hendecourt-les-Cagnicourt, Pas-de-Calais, France. The cemetery is roughly three kilometres northeast of the village (plot I, row F, grave 15). His Victoria Cross is on display in The Calgary Highlanders gallery at The Military Museums, on loan from the Glenbow Museum in Calgary, Alberta, Canada.

A plaque commemorating Knight's VC action was dedicated in Villers-les-Cagnicourt in April 2015 by a delegation of The Calgary Highlanders.
