= 88th Battalion (Victoria Fusiliers), CEF =

88th Battalion, CEF
- Active: 1915–1916
- Disbanded: 1920
- Country: Canada
- Branch: Canadian Expeditionary Force
- Type: Infantry
- Mobilization headquarters: Victoria, British Columbia
- Battle honours: The Great War, 1916

Commanders
- Officer Commanding: LCol H.J. Rous Cullen

The 88th (Victoria Fusiliers) Battalion, CEF was a unit in the Canadian Expeditionary Force during the First World War. Based in Victoria, British Columbia, the unit began recruiting in the autumn of 1915 in that city. After sailing to England in June 1916, the battalion was absorbed into the 30th Reserve Battalion on 18 July 1916. The 88th Battalion had one officer commanding: Lieutenant-Colonel H.J. Rous Cullen. In 1929, the battalion was awarded the theatre of war honour "The Great War, 1916".
