= Bellenden Hutcheson =

American-born Canadian recipient of the Victoria Cross (VC)

Bellenden Hutcheson VC MC
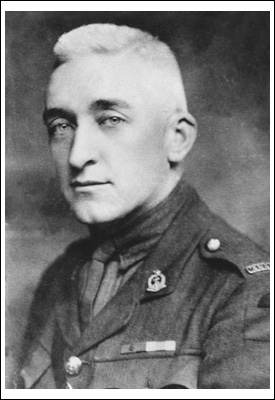
- Captain Bellenden Hutcheson c.1919
- Born: 16 December 1883; Mount Carmel, Illinois
- Died: 9 April 1954 (aged 70); Cairo, Illinois
- Burial place: Rosehill Cemetery, Mount Carmel, Illinois
- Military career
- Allegiance: Canada
- Branch: Canadian Expeditionary Force
- Service years: 1915–1919
- Rank: Captain
- Units: Canadian Army Medical Corps
- Conflicts: First World War
- Awards: Victoria Cross; Military Cross

Bellenden Seymour Hutcheson VC, MC (16 December 1883 – 9 April 1954) was an American-born Canadian recipient of the Victoria Cross (VC) during the First World War. The VC is the highest award for gallantry in the face of the enemy that can be awarded to British and Commonwealth forces. Hutcheson was one of the seven Canadians to be awarded the Victoria Cross for their deeds on one single day, 2 September 1918, for actions across the 30 km long Drocourt-Quéant Line near Arras, France. The other six were Arthur George Knight, William Henry Metcalf, Claude Joseph Patrick Nunney, Cyrus Wesley Peck, Walter Leigh Rayfield and John Francis Young.

== Biography ==
Hutcheson was a graduate of Northwestern University Medical School. In 1915, he renounced his United States citizenship in order to join the Canadian Army as a medical officer. He reclaimed his American citizenship after the war.

He was 34 years old, and a captain in the Canadian Army Medical Corps, Canadian Expeditionary Force, attached to 75th (Mississauga) Battalion, during the First World War. He was awarded the MC in 1918 for attending to and dressing the wounded.

On 2 September 1918 in France, Captain Hutcheson went through the Drocourt-Quéant Support Line with his battalion, remaining on the field until every wounded man had been attended to. He dressed the wounds of a seriously hurt officer under terrific machine-gun and shell fire, and with the help of prisoners and his own men, succeeded in evacuating the officer to safety. Immediately afterwards, he rushed forward in full view of the enemy to attend a wounded sergeant, and having placed him in a shell-hole, dressed his wounds.

The citation reads:

His Majesty the KING has been graciously pleased to approve of the award of the Victoria Cross to:–

Capt. Bellenden Seymour Hutcheson, Can. A. Med. Corps, attd. 75th Bn., 1st Central Ontario R.

For most conspicuous bravery and devotion to duty on September 2nd, when under most intense shell, machine-gun and rifle fire, he went through the Queant-Drocourt Support Line with the battalion. Without hesitation and with utter disregard of personal safety he remained on the field until every wounded man had been attended to. He dressed the wounds of a seriously wounded officer under terrific machine-gun and shell fire, and, with the assistance of prisoners and of his own men, succeeded in evacuating him to safety, despite the fact that the bearer party suffered heavy casualties.

Immediately afterwards he rushed forward, in full view of the enemy, under heavy machine-gun and rifle fire, to tend a wounded sergeant, and, having placed him in a shell-hole, dressed his wounds. Captain Hutcheson performed many similar gallant acts, and, by his coolness and devotion to duty, many lives were saved.

— London Gazette, 14 December 1918.

== Legacy ==
The 75th Battalion's lineage is today continued by the Toronto Scottish Regiment (Queen Elizabeth The Queen Mother's Own), a reserve infantry regiment of the Canadian Forces. In 2009 a new armoury was opened in Etobicoke for the regiment. This facility was named in honour of Captain Hutcheson.
