= Claude Nunney =

Canadian soldier

Claude Joseph Patrick Nunney VC DCM MM
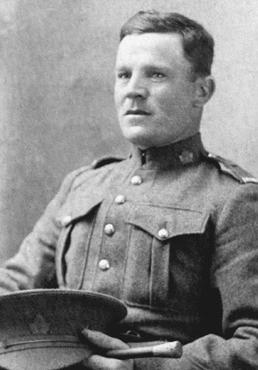
- Born: 24 December 1892; Hastings, England
- Died: 18 September 1918 (aged 25); Vis-en-Artois, France
- Burial place: Aubigny Communal Cemetery Extension, near Aubigny-en-Artois
- Military career
- Allegiance: Canada
- Branch: Canadian Expeditionary Force
- Service years: 1913–1918
- Rank: Corporal
- Units: Stormont, Dundas and Glengarry Highlanders; 38th Battalion, CEF
- Conflicts: First World War: Western Front; Hundred Days Offensive; Battle of Drocourt-Quéant Line (DOW)
- Awards: Victoria Cross; Distinguished Conduct Medal; Military Medal

Claude Joseph Patrick Nunney VC, DCM, MM (24 December 1892 – 18 September 1918) was a Canadian soldier. Nunney was a recipient of the Victoria Cross, the highest award for gallantry in the face of the enemy that can be awarded to British and Commonwealth forces. Born in Hastings in East Sussex, he was sent to Canada as a home child.

Nunney was one of the seven Canadians to be awarded the Victoria Cross for their actions on one single day, 2 September 1918, for actions across the 30 km long Drocourt-Quéant Line near Arras, France. The other six were Bellenden Hutcheson, Arthur George Knight, William Henry Metcalf, Cyrus Wesley Peck, Walter Leigh Rayfield and John Francis Young.

== Early life ==
Claude Joseph Patrick Nunney VC is buried in Aubigny Communal Cemetery Extension; he was born in Hastings as Stephen Sargent Claude Nunney. His father was William Percy Nunney and his mother Mary Nunney formerly Sargent at 42 Bexhill Road, Hastings on 19 July 1892. His father was born in Burford, Oxfordshire. Claude, as he was called within his family, was the fourth of eight children. The family left Hastings in 1895 and moved to Kentish Town, St Pancras, in London where his mother was to sadly die of food poisoning in February 1899. Two of Claude's younger siblings died very young, and of the remaining six, five passed into the care of the Catholic Church. The three boys born in Hastings, Frederick George, Stephen Claude and Alfred Nunney all became "Home Children" in Canada.

Alfred and Stephen Nunney travelled together aboard the SS Tunisian in October 1905 to Quebec and then on to St George's Home at Hintonburg, Ottawa, Ontario. They were sent to different families, Alfred moving to the Micksburg County, Renfrew, and Claude to North Lancaster. Alfred was just twelve, as he was born on 29 September 1893, and Claude thirteen when they went in their separate directions. Claude Nunney was placed with Mrs Donald Roy McDonald.

Unbeknownst to Claude, his brother George Nunney, who came as a Home Child to Canada in October 1904, was drowned on the 19 July 1908 in the Jock River, Jockvale, around 150 km from North Lancaster. He was aged only 17. He had also been born in Hastings on 27 December 1890. He had been placed with Patrick Houlahan, a local farmer.

There has been some debate as to Nunney's origins. Whilst Nunney himself stated he was born in Dublin, Ireland, he was actually born in Hastings, England as Stephen Sargent Claude Nunney. Also it is claimed that Nunney did not become a Canadian citizen by naturalisation, but by becoming part of the Home Children program.

Dave Lorente (Homechildren Canada) wrote in an article on Claude:

It is interesting to speculate how Claude Nunney would answer, were he alive today and asked to give his first names, DOB and birthplace, because for some unknown reason or reasons he knowingly or unwittingly gave false information when he joined up in World War I. Perhaps it was because, like so many other Home Children, he had lost his baptismal record and/or birth certificate. ... [H]is birth certificate shows he was actually born in Hastings, England – not in Dublin as his military Attestation papers show. Nor was he Irish...and his name was not Claude Joseph Patrick Nunney as he stated but Stephen Sargent Claude Nunney' – the 'Sargent' being his mother's maiden name. His birthdate was also wrong and he came to Canada as Stephen – not Claude. All that said, none of it detracts in any way from the brave things he did during World War I when he became one of 'Canada's Magnificent Seven' and won the former Empire and Commonwealth's highest award for bravery in the ranks.

"Canada's Magnificent Seven" were the seven Canadian soldiers who all earned the Victoria Cross on 2 September 1918.

Nunney initially joined the Stormont, Dundas and Glengarry Highlanders in 1913, before joining the 38th Battalion (Ottawa), CEF and thus Nunney is claimed by both the SD&G Highlanders and the Cameron Highlanders.

== Victoria Cross Award ==
Nunney was a member of the 38th (Ottawa) Battalion, Canadian Expeditionary Force which is perpetuated by the Cameron Highlanders of Ottawa (Duke of Edinburgh's Own). Nunney was a private in the First World War when the following deeds took place for which he was awarded the VC:

For most conspicuous bravery during the operations against the Drocourt-Quéant Line on Sept. 1st and 2nd, 1918.

On Sept. 1st, when his battalion was in the vicinity of Vis-en-Artois, preparatory to the advance, the enemy laid down a heavy barrage and counter-attacked. Pte. Nunney, who was at this time at company headquarters, immediately on his own initiative proceeded through the barrage to the company outpost lines, going from post to post and encouraging the men by his own fearless example. The enemy were repulsed and a critical situation was saved.

During the attack on Sept. 2nd, his dash continually placed him in advance of his companions, and his fearless example undoubtedly helped greatly to carry the company forward to its objectives. When his battalion which was preparing to advance, was heavily counter-attacked by the enemy, Private Nunney on his own initiative, went forward through the barrage to the company out-post lines, going from post to post and encouraging the men by his own fearless example.

– London Gazette 13 December 1918

He died aged 25, 16 days after receiving what proved to be mortal wounds and was buried at Aubigny Communal Cemetery Extension, near Aubigny-en-Artois (Grave reference number IV. B. 39).

== The medal ==
All of Nunney's medals (he had earlier in the war won the Military Medal and the Distinguished Conduct Medal at the Battle of Vimy Ridge), including his VC are displayed above the fireplace at Cornwall Armoury in Cornwall, Ontario.
