= Battle of Drocourt-Quéant Line =

Battle in France during World War I

Battle of the Drocourt-Queant Line
- Part of the Western Front of the First World War
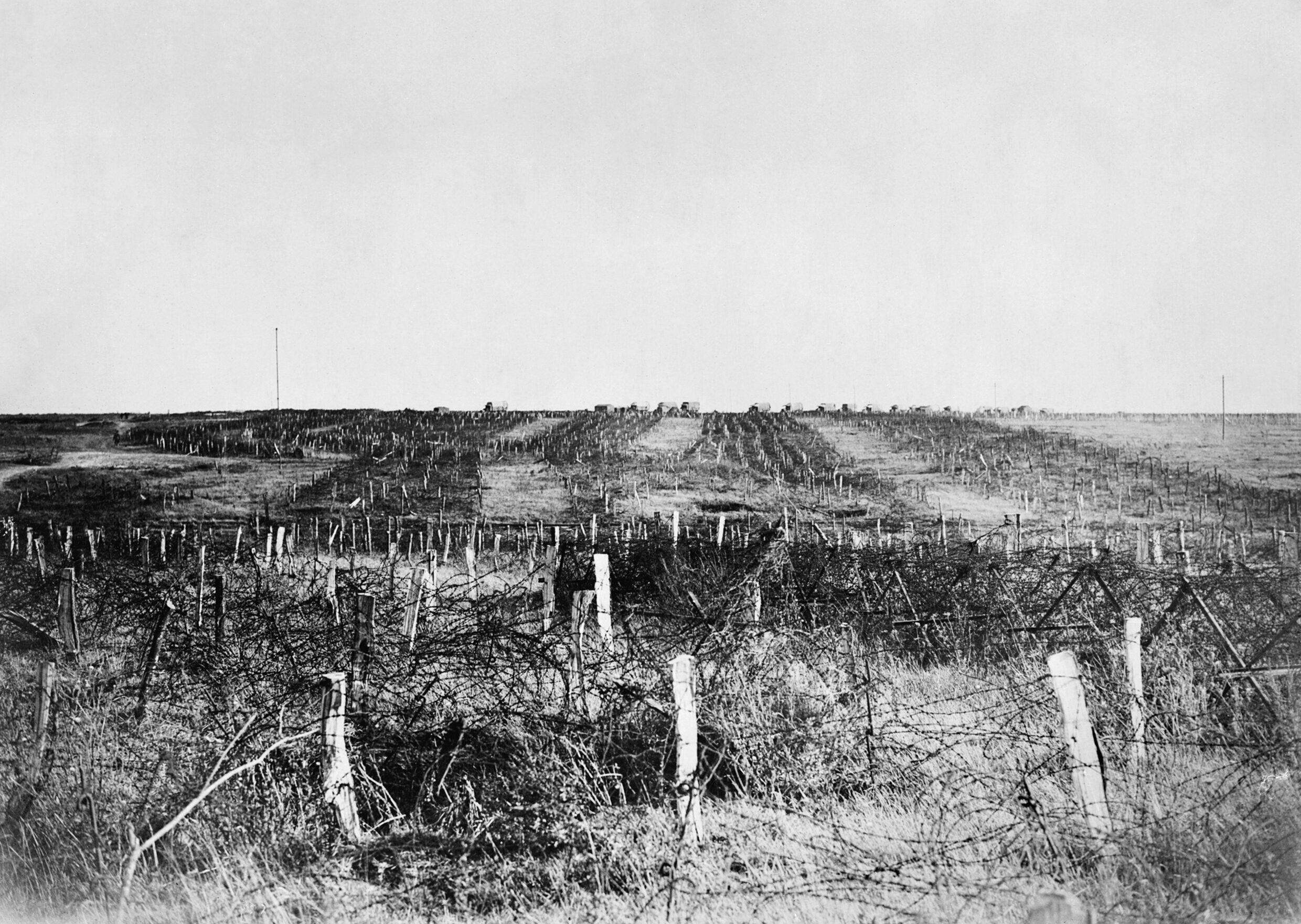
- German wire at Quéant, 4 October 1918
Date	1–3 September 1918
Location	East of Lens, south to Quéant near Bullecourt on the Siegfriedstellung (Hindenburg Line) North end 50°23′31″N 02°55′39″E; South end 50°10′48″N 02°59′03″E
Result	Canadian and British victory
Territorial changes	German army withdrew 40 miles (64 km) to the Hindenburg Line, February–March 1917

Belligerents
Canada; United Kingdom	German Empire

Commanders and leaders
(United Kingdom) Henry Horne (Canada) Arthur Currie	(German Empire) Otto von Below

The Drocourt-Quéant Line ([dʁɔ.kuʁ ke.ɑ̃]; German: Wotan Stellung) was a set of mutually supporting defensive lines constructed by Germany between the French towns of Drocourt and Quéant during World War I. This defensive system was part of the northernmost section of the Hindenburg Line, a vast German defensive system that ran through northeastern France.

It was attacked and captured by Canadian and British troops in the closing months of the war as part of Canada's Hundred Days of successful offensive campaigning that helped end the war.

== Description ==
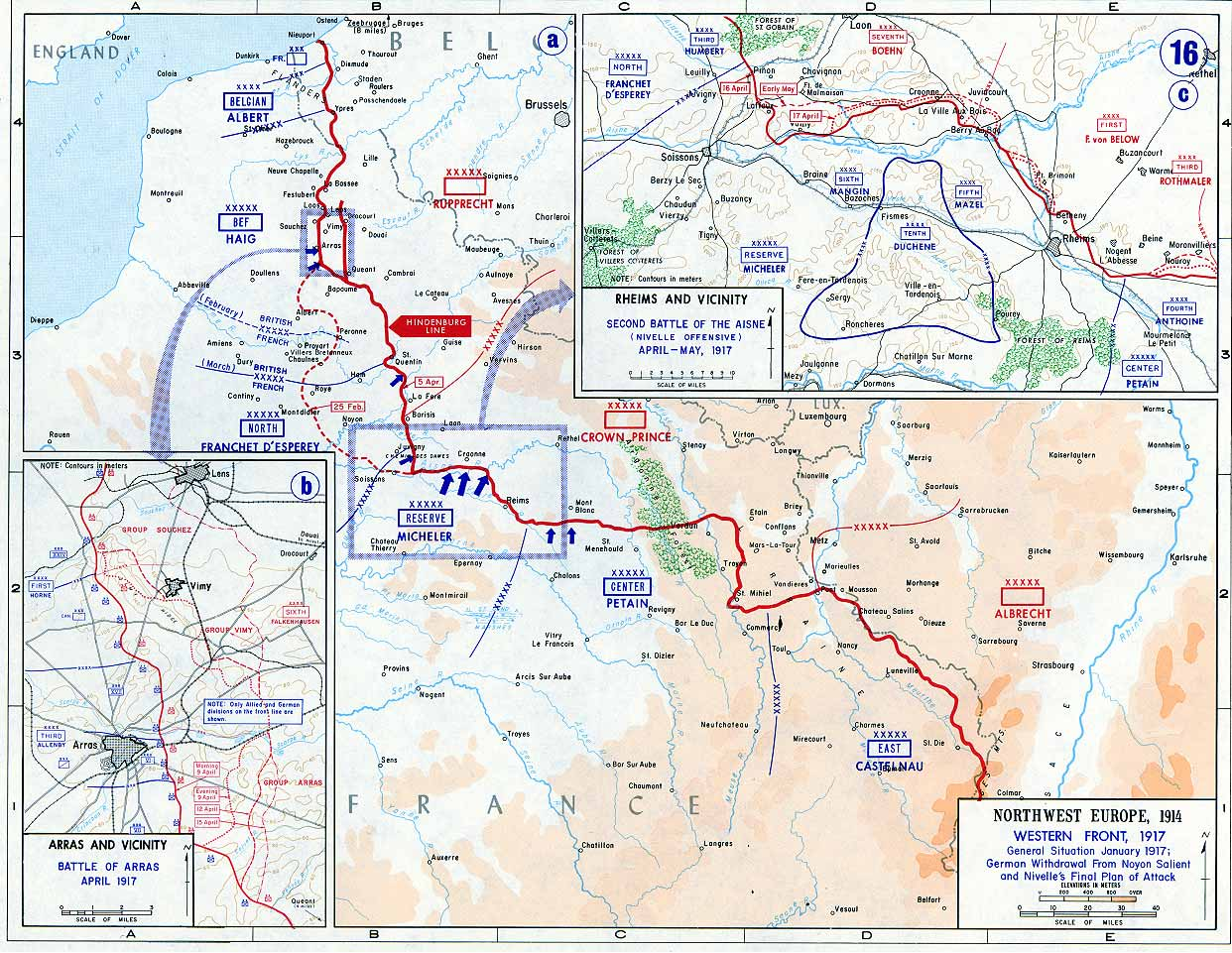
Western front 1917

The Drocourt–Quéant Line (also referred to as the Drocourt–Quéant Switch) ran between the French cities of Drocourt and Quéant and was part of a defensive system that ran from a point within the Hindenburg Line, 18 km (11 mi) west of Cambrai, northward to within 11 km (7 mi) west of Douai and terminated along the front east of Armentières. The Drocourt–Quéant Line was a system in depth and incorporated a number of mutually supporting lines of defence. The system consisted of a front line system and a support line system, each consisting of two lines of trenches. The system incorporated numerous fortifications including concrete bunkers, machine gun posts and heavy belts of barbed wire.

== Prelude ==
In the days leading up to the attack, the Drocourt–Quéant Line was obscured from Canadian observation west of Cagnicourt due to a hill. An attack was ordered, with the 72nd Battalion on the left and the 5th Battalion on the right.

At 4:50 am on 1 September 1918, the Canadian soldiers attacked and captured high ground northwest of Cagnicourt, securing observation into the Drocourt–Quéant Line, but suffering heavy losses in the process.

== Capture ==
At 5:00 a.m. on 2 September 1918, Canadian and British forces attacked the Drocourt–Quéant Line supported by tanks and aircraft. In twilight, the Canadian 1st Division attacked the line south-eastwards, on the extreme right, south of the Arras–Cambrai road, The Canadian 4th Division attacked in the centre between Dury and the main road and the British 4th Division attacked south of the River Sensee.

Seven Canadians were awarded VCs individually that day: Bellenden Hutcheson, Arthur George Knight, William Henry Metcalf, Claude Nunney, Cyrus Wesley Peck, Walter Leigh Rayfield and John Francis Young.

The next day the Germans retreated to the Hindenburg Line with the Allies taking many prisoners. The Canadian and British troops then moved on to their next battle, the Battle of the Canal du Nord.

== Memorials ==
The Canadian Dury Memorial commemorates the Canadian Corps attack on the Drocourt–Quéant Line in 1918.
