= List of Canadian Victoria Cross recipients =

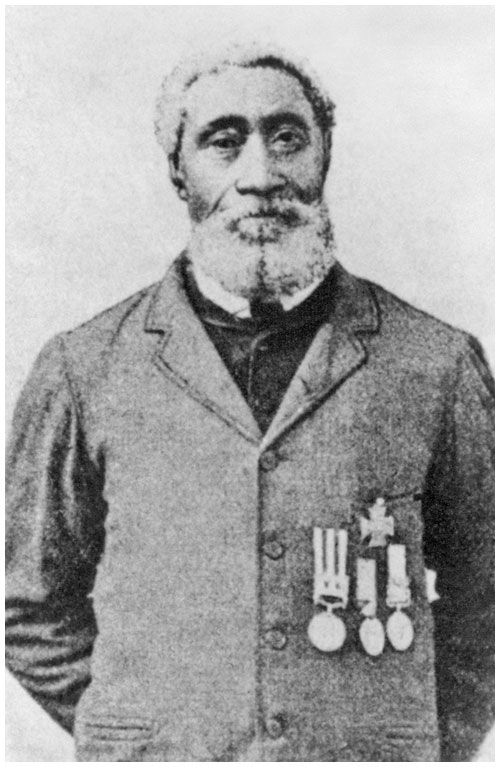
Canadian William Hall was the first black recipient of the Victoria Cross.

The Victoria Cross (VC) is the highest award of the United Kingdom honours system. It is awarded for gallantry "in the face of the enemy" to members of armed forces of the United Kingdom and was in the past also awarded to members of armed forces of Canada and other Commonwealth countries. Canada, like most of the others, has established its own honours systems and no longer recommends VCs and other British honours. The Canadian Victoria Cross was created in 1993, as the highest award in the Canadian honours system.

During the time Canadians were eligible for the VC, it was sometimes awarded posthumously and awarded to a person of any military rank in any service and to civilians under military command. No Canadian civilian ever won the VC. Since the first awards were presented by Queen Victoria in 1857, two thirds of all awards were personally presented by the British monarch of the time. These investitures were usually held at Buckingham Palace.

== Background ==
Established in 1856, the Victoria Cross has been awarded to service personnel for extraordinary valour and devotion to duty mostly while facing a hostile force. Between 1858 and 1881 the Victoria Cross could be awarded for extraordinary actions taken "under circumstances of extreme danger" not in the face of the enemy. Six people were awarded Victoria Crosses under this clause, two of them having a connection to Canada – one to an Irish soldier serving in the British army in Canada for actions taken in 1866 during the Fenian raids; and five (to a Canadian, three Irishmen and an Englishman) for a dangerous boat rescue in 1867 during the Andaman Islands Expedition. In 1881, VC regulations were amended to only allow acts "in the presence of the enemy".

Since 1993, Canadians are not eligible for the Victoria Cross. That medal was superseded by the Canadian Victoria Cross – of equal honour, but yet to be awarded. The scroll of the Canadian VC differs in that the inscription is in Latin rather than English. By using a language that is an ancestor of French and has greatly contributed to the development of English, the medal avoids linguistic discrimination between Canada's two official languages. The fleur-de-lis, in heraldry long associated with the French crown has been added at the end each scroll. The actual metal of the medal is a distinct Canadian composition.

At a time when VCs could be awarded for actions taken not in the face of enemy fire, Timothy O'Hea, a 23-year-old Irishman in the British army, fought a fire in a railway car containing 900 kilograms of ammunition stationed at Danville, Canada East, during the Fenian raids. He is not listed in this article as he was not born in Canada nor a naturalized citizen. O'Hea is the only VC recipient awarded for actions on Canadian soil.

== Summary ==
According to Veterans Affairs Canada, the Victoria Cross has been presented to 99 Canadians, or people closely associated with Canada, between its creation for acts performed during the Crimean War and 1993 when the Canadian Victoria Cross was instituted. No Canadian received the VC from 1945 to 1993, and no Canadian has yet been awarded the Canadian Victoria Cross, instituted in 1993. One list solely includes individuals, irrespective of their country of origin, who served in the Canadian armed forces. The Veterans’ Affairs site broadens the criteria to encompass those born in Canada who received the VC while in the United Kingdom armed forces.

The first Canadian to be awarded the Victoria Cross was Alexander Roberts Dunn for his actions in 1854, during the Battle of Balaclava in the Crimean War. William Hall, a Nova Scotian, was the first black recipient of the Victoria Cross. The last living Canadian recipient of the British Victoria Cross, "Smokey" Smith, died in August 2005.

Canadians were awarded the Victoria Cross for actions performed in the Crimean War (Battle of Balaclava), the Indian Mutiny (AKA the Indian Rebellion of 1857), a native uprising at a remote Indian Ocean island during the Andaman Islands Expedition, the Battle of Omdurman during the Sudan Campaign of 1896–1899, and the Second Boer War. The Victoria Cross was awarded to 73 Canadians and other members of the Canadian army for actions during the First World War, and sixteen Canadians received the VC during the Second World War. Lieutenant Robert Hampton Gray of the Royal Canadian Navy Volunteer Reserve was the last Canadian to win the VC during the Second World War. He was the last Canadian to receive the Victoria Cross ever.

Seven Canadians were awarded VCs individually on one single day, 2 September 1918, for actions they performed along the 30 km long Drocourt-Quéant Line near Arras, France: Bellenden Hutcheson, Arthur George Knight, William Henry Metcalf, Claude Nunney, Cyrus Wesley Peck, Walter Leigh Rayfield and John Francis Young. Their acts of valour were performed during Canada's Hundred Days, a period of successful offensive campaigning that helped end the war.

== Recipients ==
(This list is arranged alphabetically when first opened but the order can be changed to other criteria such as date of valourous action, by clicking in box at top of each column.)

Purple highlight with an asterisk *, indicates that the Victoria Cross was awarded posthumously

| Name | Date of action | Conflict | Unit | Perpetuating unit | Place of action | Province of origin | Notes |
|---|---|---|---|---|---|---|---|
| Wallace Algie | 1918* | World War I Canada's Hundred Days | 20th Battalion, CEF | Queen's York Rangers (1st American Regiment) | Cambrai, France | Ontario | |
| William Barker | 1918 | World War I Aerial combat | No. 201 Squadron RAF | None | Forêt de Mormal, France | Manitoba | |
| Colin Barron | 1917 | World War I Second Battle of Passchendaele | 3rd Battalion, CEF | Royal Regiment of Canada | Passchendaele, Belgium | Ontario | |
| Ian Bazalgette | 1944* | World War II Aerial heroics during bombing raid on V-1 flying bomb site | No. 115 Squadron RAF | No. 115 Squadron RAF | Trossy St. Maximin, France | Alberta | |
| Edward Bellew | 1915 | World War I Second Battle of Ypres | 7th Battalion, CEF | British Columbia Regiment (Duke of Connaught's Own) | Kerselaere, Belgium | British Columbia | |
| Philip Bent | 1917* | World War I Battle of Polygon Wood | 9th Battalion, The Leicestershire Regiment | B Company, 2nd Battalion, Royal Anglian Regiment | Polygon Wood, Belgium | Nova Scotia | |
| William Bishop | 1917 | World War I Aerial combat | No. 60 Squadron RAF | No. 60 Squadron RAF | Cambrai, France | Ontario | |
| Rowland Bourke | 1918 | World War I First Ostend Raid | Royal Naval Volunteer Reserve | Royal Naval Volunteer Reserve | Ostend, Belgium | British Columbia | |
| Alexander Brereton | 1918 | World War I Canada's Hundred Days (Battle of Amiens)) | 8th Battalion, CEF | Royal Winnipeg Rifles | Amiens, France | Manitoba | |
| Jean Brillant | 1918* | World War I Canada's Hundred Days (Battle of Amiens) | 22nd Battalion, CEF | Royal 22^{e} Régiment | Meharicourt, France | Quebec | |
| Harry Brown | 1917* | World War I Battle of Hill 70 | 10th Battalion, CEF | Royal Winnipeg Rifles and Calgary Highlanders (10th Canadians) | Lens, France | Ontario | |
| Hugh Cairns | 1918* | World War I (Note: He was the last Canadian awarded the Victoria Cross for actions taken during WWI, His actions being made on 2 November 1918, just nine days before the Armistice.) Canada's Hundred Days | 46th Battalion, CEF | Saskatchewan Dragoons | Valenciennes, France | Saskatchewan | |
| Frederick Campbell | 1915* | World War I Trench warfare | 1st Battalion, CEF | Royal Canadian Regiment | Givenchy, France | Ontario | |
| William Clark-Kennedy | 1918 | World War I Canada's Hundred Days | 24th Battalion, CEF | Victoria Rifles of Canada | Fresnes, France | Quebec | |
| Leo Clarke | 1916* | World War I Battle of Flers-Courcelette | 2nd Battalion, CEF | Governor General's Foot Guards | Pozières, France | Manitoba | (Note: One of three WWI Canadian VC recipients who lived on same block on Pine Street (now Valour Road) in Winnipeg: Leo Clarke, Frederick Hall and Robert Shankland) |
| Hampden Cockburn | 1900 | Second Boer War Battle of Leliefontein | Royal Canadian Dragoons | Royal Canadian Dragoons | Komati River, South Africa | Ontario | |
| Robert Combe | 1917* | World War I Battle of Arras | 27th Battalion, CEF | Royal Winnipeg Rifles | Acheville, France | Saskatchewan | |
| Frederick Coppins | 1918 | World War I Canada's Hundred Days (Battle of Amiens) | 8th Battalion, CEF | Royal Winnipeg Rifles | Hackett Woods, France | Manitoba | |
| Aubrey Cosens | 1945* (25–26 February) | World War II Incursion into Germany | 1st Battalion, The Queen's Own Rifles of Canada | Queen's Own Rifles of Canada | Mooshof, Germany | Ontario | |
| John Croak | 1918* | World War I Canada's Hundred Days (Battle of Amiens) | 13th Battalion, CEF | Black Watch (Royal Highland Regiment) of Canada | Amiens, France | Nova Scotia | . (Note: Born in the Newfoundland Colony, moved to Canada at age 2.) |
| Robert Cruickshank | 1918 | World War I Palestine campaign | 2/14th (County of London) Battalion, The London Regiment (London Scottish) | London Regiment | Jordan, Palestine | Manitoba | (Note: Recipients were Canadians, but were serving in other army units at the time of their VC act) |
| David Currie | 1944 | World War II Falais pocket | 29th Armoured Reconnaissance Regiment (The South Alberta Regiment) | South Alberta Light Horse | Battle of Falaise, France | Saskatchewan | |
| Raymond de Montmorency | 1898 | Battle of Omdurman, Anglo-Egyptian conquest of Sudan | 21st Lancers | Royal Lancers | Omdurman, Sudan | Quebec | (Note: He was the first Canadian awarded the Victoria Cross for actions subsequent to Canadian Confederation) |
| Edmund De Wind | 1918* | World War I defence against German spring offensive | 15th Battalion, The Royal Irish Rifles | Royal Irish Regiment | Groagie, France | Alberta | (Note: Although born in Ireland, was enlisted in the Canadian army and is considered Canadian at the time he won the medal, and Albertan because he was working in an Edmonton bank when he enlisted.) |
| Thomas Dinesen | 1918 | World War I Canada's Hundred Days | 42nd Battalion, CEF | Black Watch (Royal Highland Regiment) of Canada | Parvillers, France | n/a | (Note: Although a Danish citizen who enlisted in the Canadian army, he is considered Canadian at the time he won the medal. His sister was famed author Isak Dinesen/Karen Blixen.) |
| Campbell Douglas | 1867 | Andaman Islands Expedition (Bravery at Sea) | 24th Regiment of Foot | Royal Welsh | Little Andaman, India | Ontario | (Note: Awarded VC for actions taken not in the face of the enemy, one of only six awarded this way) |
| Alexander Dunn | 1854 | Battle of Balaclava, Crimean War | 33rd Regiment of Foot | Yorkshire Regiment | Balaclava, Crimea | Ontario | (Note: First Canadian to earn VC, during the Charge of the Light Brigade, 25 October 1854.) |
| Frederick Fisher | 1915* | World War I Second Battle of Ypres | 13th Battalion, CEF | Black Watch (Royal Highland Regiment) of Canada | St. Julien, Belgium | Ontario | |
| Gordon Flowerdew | 1918* | World War I defence against German spring offensive Battle of Moreuil Wood | Lord Strathcona's Horse (Royal Canadians) | Lord Strathcona's Horse (Royal Canadians) | Bois de Moreuil, France | British Columbia | |
| John Foote | 1942 | World War II Dieppe raid | 1st Battalion, The Royal Hamilton Light Infantry | Royal Hamilton Light Infantry (Wentworth Regiment) | Dieppe, France | Ontario | |
| Benjamin Geary | 1915 | World War I Capture of Hill 60 | 1st Battalion | Princess of Wales's Royal Regiment | Ypres, Belgium | Marylebone, London | |
| Herman Good | 1918 | World War I Canada's Hundred Days (Battle of Amiens) | 13th Battalion, CEF | Black Watch (Royal Highland Regiment) of Canada | Hangard Wood, France | New Brunswick | |
| Robert Gray | 1945* (Aug. 9) | World War II Pacific War aerial attack on Japanese navy in home waters | Royal Canadian Navy Volunteer Reserve HMS Formidable | Royal Canadian Navy | Onagawa Bay, Japan | British Columbia | (Note: Last Canadian awarded the VC, for actions sinking the Japanese escort ship Amakusa, 9 August 1945.) |
| Milton Gregg | 1918 | World War I Canada's Hundred Days | Royal Canadian Regiment | Royal Canadian Regiment | Cambrai, France | New Brunswick | |
| Frederick Hall | 1915* | World War I Second Battle of Ypres | 8th Battalion, CEF | Royal Winnipeg Rifles | Ypres, Belgium | Manitoba | |
| William Hall | 1857 | Indian rebellion of 1857 | HMS Shannon | none | Lucknow, India | Nova Scotia | |
| Robert Hanna | 1917 | World War I Battle of Hill 70 | 29th Battalion, CEF | British Columbia Regiment (Duke of Connaught's Own) | Lens, France | British Columbia | |
| Frederick Harvey | 1917 | World War I Trench warfare | Lord Strathcona's Horse (Royal Canadians) | Lord Strathcona's Horse (Royal Canadians) | Guyencourt, France | Alberta | |
| Frederick Hobson | 1917* | World War I Battle of Hill 70 | 20th Battalion, CEF | Queen's York Rangers (1st American Regiment) (RCAC) | Lens, France | Ontario | |
| Charles Hoey | 1944* | World War II Burma campaign, Battle of the Admin Box | 1st Battalion, Lincolnshire Regiment | Royal Anglian Regiment | Ngakyedauk Pass, Burma (now Myanmar) | British Columbia | |
| Edward Holland | 1900 | Second Boer War Battle of Leliefontein | Royal Canadian Dragoons | Royal Canadian Dragoons | Komati River, South Africa | Ontario | |
| Thomas Holmes | 1917 | World War I Second Battle of Passchendaele | 4th Canadian Mounted Rifles Battalion, CEF | Governor General's Horse Guards | Passchendaele, Belgium | Ontario | |
| Samuel Honey | 1918* | World War I Canada's Hundred Days | 78th Battalion, CEF | Winnipeg Grenadiers | Bourlon Wood, France | Ontario | |
| David Hornell | 1944* | World War II Battle of Atlantic | No. 162 Squadron RCAF | | Faroes, Atlantic | Ontario | |
| Bellenden Hutcheson | 1918 | World War I Canada's Hundred Days | 75th Battalion, CEF | Toronto Scottish Regiment (Queen Elizabeth The Queen Mother's Own) | Arras, France | Ontario | (Note: Although an American citizen who enlisted in the Canadian army, is considered Canadian at the time he won the medal) |
| Joseph Kaeble | 1918* | World War I Trench warfare | 22nd Battalion, CEF | Royal 22^{e} Régiment | Neuville-Vitasse, France | Quebec | |
| George Kerr | 1918 | World War I Canada's Hundred Days | 3rd Battalion, CEF | Queen's Own Rifles of Canada and Royal Regiment of Canada | Bourlon Wood, France | Ontario | |
| John Kerr | 1916 | World War I Battle of Flers–Courcelette | 49th Battalion, CEF | Loyal Edmonton Regiment (4th Battalion, Princess Patricia's Canadian Light Infantry) | Courcelette, France | Nova Scotia Alberta (Note: Kerr was born in Nova Scotia and moved to farm in Alberta before enlisting in Edmonton unit.) | |
| Cecil Kinross | 1917 | World War I Second Battle of Passchendaele | 49th Battalion, CEF | Loyal Edmonton Regiment (4th Battalion, Princess Patricia's Canadian Light Infantry) | Passchendaele, Belgium | Alberta | |
| Arthur Knight | 1918* | World War I Canada's Hundred Days | 10th Battalion, CEF | Royal Winnipeg Rifles and Calgary Highlanders (10th Canadians) | Villers-les-Cagnicourt, France (near Arras) | Saskatchewan | |
| Filip Konowal | 1917 | World War I Battle of Hill 70 | 47th Battalion, CEF | Royal Westminster Regiment | Lens, France | n/a | (Note: Although a Ukrainian citizen who enlisted in the Canadian army, is considered Canadian at the time he won the medal) |
| Okill Learmonth | 1917* | World War I Battle of Hill 70 | 2nd Battalion, CEF | Governor General's Foot Guards | Lens, France | Quebec | |
| Graham Lyall | 1918 | World War I Canada's Hundred Days | 102nd Battalion, CEF | British Columbia Regiment (Duke of Connaught's Own) | Cambrai, France | Ontario | |
| Thain MacDowell | 1917 | World War I Vimy Ridge | 38th Battalion, CEF | Cameron Highlanders of Ottawa (Duke of Edinburgh's Own) | Vimy Ridge, France | Ontario | |
| John MacGregor | 1918 | World War I Canada's Hundred Days | 2nd Canadian Mounted Rifles Battalion, CEF | British Columbia Dragoons | Cambrai, France | British Columbia | |
| John Mahony | 1944 | World War II Italian campaign | 1st Battalion, The Westminster Regiment (Motor) | Royal Westminster Regiment | River Melfa, Italy | British Columbia | |
| George McKean | 1918 | World War I Trench warfare | 14th Battalion, CEF | Royal Montreal Regiment | Gavrelle Sector, France | Alberta | |
| Hugh McKenzie | 1917* | World War I Second Battle of Passchendaele | Canadian Machine Gun Corps | Royal Canadian Armoured Corps | Meetscheele Spur, Belgium | Ontario Alberta | (Note: McKenzie was born in Liverpool, moved to Ontario before enlisting in Alberta unit.) |
| Alan McLeod | 1918* | World War I Aerial combat | No. 2 Squadron RFC | No. 2 Squadron RAF | Albert, France | Manitoba | |
| William Merrifield | 1918 | World War I Canada's Hundred Days | 4th Battalion, CEF | 56th Field Artillery Regiment, RCA, Royal Hamilton Light Infantry (Wentworth Regiment) | Abancourt, France | Ontario | |
| Charles Merritt | 1942 | World War II Dieppe Raid | 1st Battalion, The South Saskatchewan Regiment | South Saskatchewan Regiment | Dieppe, France | British Columbia | |
| William Metcalf | 1918 | World War I Canada's Hundred Days | 16th Battalion, CEF | Canadian Scottish Regiment | Arras, France | n/a | |
| William Milne | 1917* | World War I Vimy Ridge | 16th Battalion, CEF | Canadian Scottish Regiment | Thelus, France | Saskatchewan | |
| Harry Miner | 1918* | World War I Canada's Hundred Days (Battle of Amiens) | 58th Battalion, CEF | Royal Regiment of Canada | Demuin, France | Ontario | |
| Coulson Norman Mitchell | 1918 | World War I Canada's Hundred Days | 4th Battalion Canadian Engineers | | Canal de L'Escaut, France | Manitoba | |
| George Mullin | 1917 | World War I Second Battle of Passchendaele | Princess Patricia's Canadian Light Infantry | Princess Patricia's Canadian Light Infantry | Passchendaele, Belgium | Saskatchewan | |
| Andrew Mynarski | 1944* | World War II Bomber campaign | No. 419 Squadron RCAF | 419 Tactical Fighter Training Squadron | Cambrai, France | Manitoba | |
| William Nickerson | 1900 | Second Boer War (Siege of Wepener) | Royal Army Medical Corps | | Wakkerstroom, South Africa | New Brunswick | |
| Claude Nunney | 1918* | World War I Canada's Hundred Days | 38th Battalion, CEF | Cameron Highlanders of Ottawa (Duke of Edinburgh's Own) | Drocourt-Queant Line, France (near Arras) | Ontario | |
| Christopher O'Kelly | 1917 | World War I Second Battle of Passchendaele | 52nd Battalion, CEF | Lake Superior Scottish Regiment | Passchendaele, Belgium | Manitoba | |
| Michael O'Leary | 1915 | World War I Canadian counterattack after German advance | 1st Battalion, Irish Guards | Irish Guards | Cuinchy, France | Saskatchewan | (Note: Considered Irish, but listed here due to residency in Canada) |
| Michael O'Rourke | 1917 | World War I Battle of Hill 70 | 7th Battalion, CEF | British Columbia Regiment (Duke of Connaught's Own) | Lens, France (Hill 70) | British Columbia | |
| John Osborn | 1941* | World War II Battle of Hong Kong | 1st Battalion, The Winnipeg Grenadiers | Winnipeg Grenadiers | Mount Butler, Hong Kong | Manitoba | |
| John Pattison | 1917* | World War I Vimy Ridge | 50th Battalion, CEF | King's Own Calgary Regiment (RCAC) | Vimy Ridge, France | Alberta | |
| George Pearkes | 1917 | World War I Second Battle of Passchendaele | 5th Canadian Mounted Rifles Battalion, CEF | Sherbrooke Hussars | Passchendaele, Belgium | Yukon | |
| Cyrus Peck | 1918 | World War I Canada's Hundred Days | 16th Battalion, CEF | Canadian Scottish Regiment | Cagnicourt, France (near Arras) | New Brunswick | |
| Frederick Peters | 1942* | World War II Operation Torch | HMS Walney | | Oran, Algeria | P.E.I. | |
| Walter Rayfield | 1918 | World War I Canada's Hundred Days | 7th Battalion, CEF | British Columbia Regiment (Duke of Connaught's Own) | Arras, France | Ontario | |
| Herbert Reade | 1857 | Indian rebellion of 1857 | 61st Regiment of Foot | The Rifles | Delhi, India | Ontario | |
| Arthur Richardson | 1900 | Second Boer War Small-unit firefight | Strathcona's Horse | Lord Strathcona's Horse (Royal Canadians) | Wolwespruit, South Africa (near the Vaal River) | Saskatchewan (Note: living at time of enlistment at Battleford) | (Note: first soldier to be awarded the Victoria Cross for actions committed while serving with a Canadian unit (even though under British command)) |
| James Richardson | 1916* | World War I Battle of the Somme | 16th Battalion, CEF | Canadian Scottish Regiment | Somme, France | British Columbia | |
| Thomas Ricketts (Note: Because Newfoundland was an independent Dominion in World War I, Ricketts was a Newfoundlander.) | 1918 | World War I Hundred Days Offensive | 1st Battalion | Royal Newfoundland Regiment | Ledeghem, Belgium | Dominion of Newfoundland (Note: Newfoundland was an independent Dominion of the British Empire which had not yet entered Canadian Confederation.) | |
| James Peter Robertson | 1917* | World War I Second Battle of Passchendaele | 27th Battalion, CEF | Royal Winnipeg Rifles | Passchendaele, Belgium | Nova Scotia Alberta | (Note: lived most of his life in Medicine Hat) |
| Charles Rutherford | 1918 | World War I Canada's Hundred Days | 5th Canadian Mounted Rifles Battalion, CEF | Sherbrooke Hussars | Monchy, France | Ontario | |
| Francis Scrimger | 1915 | World War I Second Battle of Ypres | Canadian Army Medical Corps | | St. Julien, Belgium | Quebec | |
| Robert Shankland | 1917 | World War I Second Battle of Passchendaele | 43rd Battalion, CEF | Queen's Own Cameron Highlanders of Canada | Passchendaele, Belgium | Manitoba | |
| Ellis Sifton | 1917* | World War I Vimy Ridge | 18th Battalion, CEF | Essex and Kent Scottish | Neuville-S^{t.}-Vaast, France | Ontario | |
| John Sinton | 1916 | World War I Mesopotamian campaign | Indian Medical Service | | Orah Ruins, Mesopotamia | British Columbia | |
| Ernest Smith | 1944 | World War II Italian campaign | 1st Battalion, The Seaforth Highlanders of Canada | Seaforth Highlanders of Canada | River Savio, Italy | British Columbia | |
| Robert Spall | 1918* | World War I Canada's Hundred Days | Princess Patricia's Canadian Light Infantry | Princess Patricia's Canadian Light Infantry | Parvillers, France | Manitoba | |
| Harcus Strachan | 1917 | World War I Battle of Cambrai | Fort Garry Horse | Fort Garry Horse | Masnières, France | Manitoba Alberta | (Note: Strachan enlisted in a Winnipeg unit but was a farmer in Alberta) |
| James Tait | 1918* | World War I Canada's Hundred Days (Battle of Amiens) | 78th Battalion, CEF | Winnipeg Grenadiers | Amiens, France | Manitoba | |
| Frederick Tilston | 1945 | World War II Battle of the Rhineland | 1st Battalion, The Essex Scottish Regiment | Essex and Kent Scottish | Hochwald Forest, Germany | Ontario | |
| Frederick Topham | 1945 | World War II Operation Varsity (March 1945) | 1st Canadian Parachute Battalion | | Rhine, Germany | Ontario | |
| Paul Triquet | 1943 | World War II Italian campaign | Royal 22^{e} Régiment | Royal 22^{e} Régiment | Casa Berardi, Italy | Quebec | |
| Richard Turner | 1900 | Second Boer War Battle of Leliefontein | Royal Canadian Dragoons | Royal Canadian Dragoons | Komati River, South Africa | Quebec | |
| Thomas Wilkinson | 1916* | World War I Battle of the Somme | 7th Battalion, Loyal North Lancashire Regiment | Duke of Lancaster's Regiment (King's, Lancashire and Border) | La Boiselle, France | British Columbia | (Note: Wilkinson lived in Vancouver and enlisted in a Vancouver unit Overseas, he transferred to the British Army.) |
| John Young | 1918 | World War I Canada's Hundred Days | 87th Battalion, CEF | Canadian Grenadier Guards | Dury-Arras Sector, France | Quebec | |
| Raphael Zengel | 1918 | World War I Canada's Hundred Days (Battle of Amiens) | 5th Battalion (Western Cavalry), CEF | North Saskatchewan Regiment | Warvillers, France | Saskatchewan | (Note: Although a U.S. citizen, he grew up on a Saskatchewan farm.) |

== See also ==
- Canadian order of precedence (decorations and medals)
- Persons of National Historic Significance
- List of Canadian awards
