= 8th Battalion (90th Winnipeg Rifles), CEF =

- The distinguishing patch of the 8th Battalion (90th Winnipeg Rifles), CEF.
- Active: 1914-1920
- Country: Canada
- Branch: Canadian Expeditionary Force
- Type: Infantry
- Part of: 2nd Canadian Brigade
- Nickname: The Little Black Devils of Canada
- Mottos: Latin: Hosti acie nominati, lit. 'named by the enemy force'
- Engagements: First World War

The 8th Battalion (90th Winnipeg Rifles), CEF, also known by the nickname of The Little Black Devils of Canada, was an infantry battalion of the Canadian Expeditionary Force during the Great War. The battalion was authorized on 10 August 1914 and embarked for Great Britain on 1 October 1914. It disembarked in France on 13 February 1915, where it fought as part of the 2nd Canadian Brigade, 1st Canadian Division in France and Flanders until the end of the war. The battalion was disbanded on 15 September 1920.

== History ==
The 8th Battalion was mobilized at Valcartier, Quebec on 24 September 1914 and was initially commanded by Lieutenant-Colonel Louis James Lipsett. The battalion incorporated the 90th Regiment Winnipeg Rifles which had a history dating back to 1883, elements of the 96th Lake Superior Regiment as well as fresh recruits from Brandon and Winnipeg, Manitoba and Kenora and Port Arthur, Ontario and was assigned the numeric designation as the 8th Battalion as part of a re-organization initiative of Minister of Militia and Defence Sam Hughes.

The 8th Battalion was attached to 2nd Infantry Brigade, 1st Canadian Division for the duration of the war and saw action in many the Canadian Corps' most famous and infamous battles including 2nd Ypres, the Somme, Vimy, Passchendaele, Amiens, Arras and Cambrai.

Three members of the 8th Battalion were awarded the Victoria Cross. Company Sergeant-Major Frederick William Hall was posthumously awarded the Victoria Cross for his actions on the night of 24 April 1915 during the Second Battle of Ypres. He was one of the three Great War Victoria Cross recipients who lived in the 700 block of Pine Street in Winnipeg, the others being Leo Clarke and Robert Shankland. In 1925, Pine Street was renamed Valour Road. Cpl. Alexander Picton Brereton and Cpl. Frederick George Coppins were both awarded the Victoria Cross for their actions on 9 August 1918 during the Battle of Amiens.

After the Armistice of 11 November 1918, the 8th Battalion (90th Winnipeg Rifles), CEF was re-designated as The Winnipeg Rifles on 12 March 1920 and are today perpetuated by The Royal Winnipeg Rifles.

== Nickname ==
The 8th Battalion acquired their nickname of 'The Little Black Devils of Canada’ through its connection to its ancestor unit, the 90th Regiment "Winnipeg Rifles" who had earned the moniker during the North-West Rebellion. During that conflict, government forces, clad in dark uniforms, combatted uprisings by the Métis people under Louis Riel and the Cree and Assiniboine of the District of Saskatchewan. This led to the indigenous and Métis fighters referring to their opponents as 'little black devils', which the soldiers came to adopt as an ironic badge of honour. Thus, the 90th Regiment adopted the nickname into their regimental insignia and in their motto "Hosti acie nominati" which is Latin for "named by the enemy force".

== Commanding officers ==
The 8th Battalion had six Officers Commanding:

- Lt.-Col. L. J. Lipsett, CMG, 22 September 1914 – 13 September 1915
- Lt.-Col. H. H. Matthews, DSO, 28 September 1915 – 18 June 1916
- Lt.-Col. K. C. Bedson, 14 July 1916 – 3 August 1916
- Lt.-Col. J. M. Prower, DSO, 3 August 1916 – 20 April 1918
- Lt.-Col. T. H. Raddall, DSO, 20 April 1918 – 9 August 1918
- Lt.-Col. A. L. Saunders, DSO, MC, 13 August 1918 – Demobilization

== Battle honours ==
The 8th Battalion was awarded the following battle honours:

- Ypres, 1915, '17
- Ypres, 1917
- Gravenstafel
- St. Julien
- Festubert, 1915
- Mount Sorrel
- Somme, 1916
- Thiepval
- Ancre Heights
- Arras, 1917, '18
- Vimy, 1917
- Arleux
- Hill 70
- Passchendaele
- Amiens
- Scarpe 1918
- Drocourt-Quéant
- Hindenburg Line
- Canal du Nord
- Pursuit to Mons
- France and Flanders, 1915-18

== See also ==
- List of infantry battalions in the Canadian Expeditionary Force

== Sources ==
- Canadian Expeditionary Force 1914–1919 by Col. G.W.L. Nicholson, CD, Queen's Printer, Ottawa, Ontario, 1962
