= West End, Winnipeg =

West End 'Downtown West Neighbourhood Cluster', 'Downtown West'
- Urban area
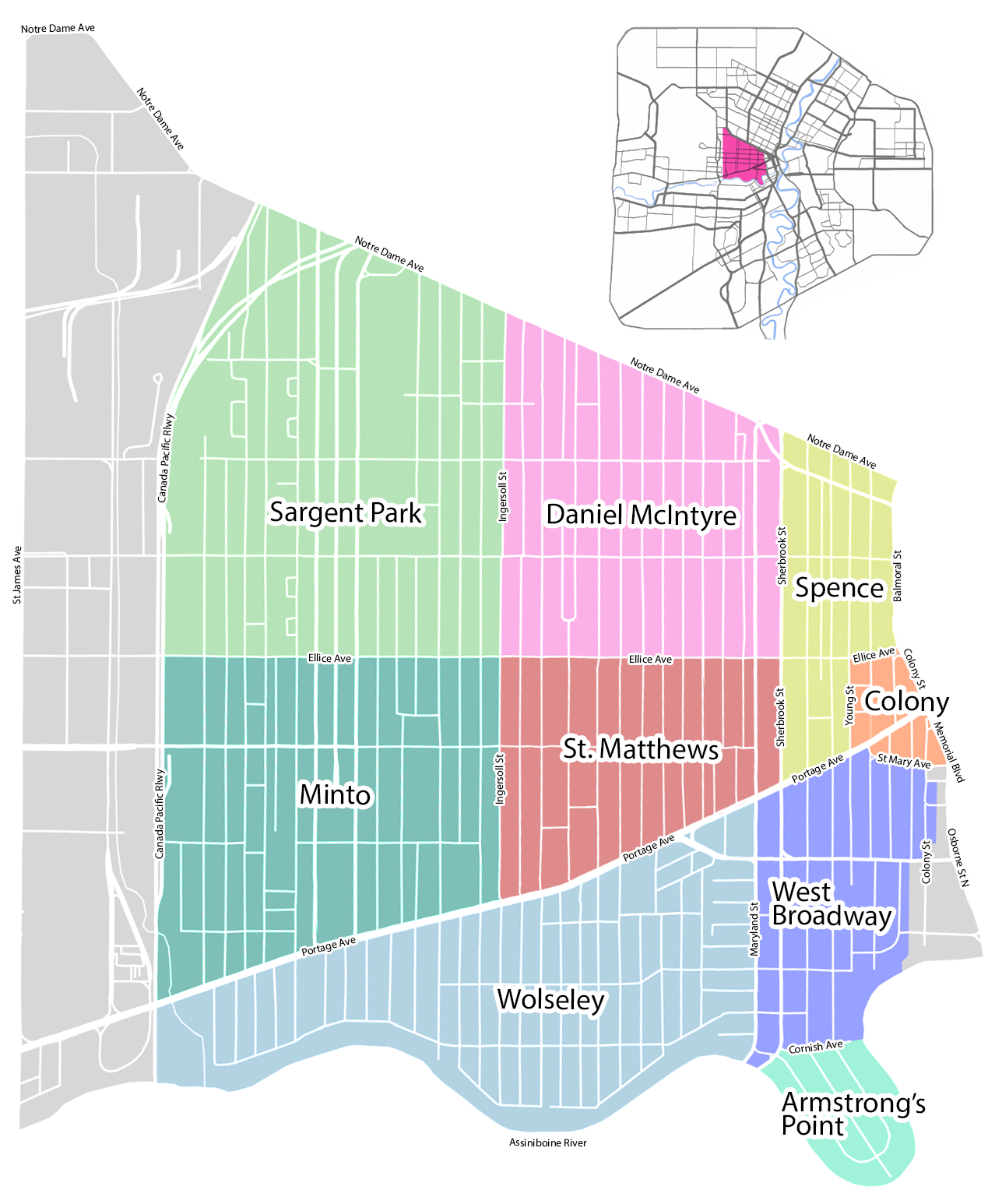
- Neighbourhoods in West End
- Country: Canada
- Province: Manitoba
- City: Winnipeg
- Neighbourhoods: Armstrong's Point; Colony; Daniel McIntyre; Minto; Sargent Park; Spence; St. Matthews; West Broadway; Wolseley

Population (2021)
  - Total: 35,075

The West End is a primarily residential area of Winnipeg, Manitoba, Canada. It includes the neighbourhoods of Armstrong's Point, Colony, Daniel McIntyre, Minto, Sargent Park, Spence, St. Matthews, West Broadway, and Wolseley.

The West End is bordered by Route 62 on the east, which is a single continuous roadway that changes names eight times (Balmoral Street, Colony Street, Memorial Boulevard, Osborne Street North, to name a few) along its path across the city. St. James Street borders the West End on the west. The Assiniboine River borders the south, and Notre Dame Avenue runs along the north border of the neighborhood.

== Demographics ==
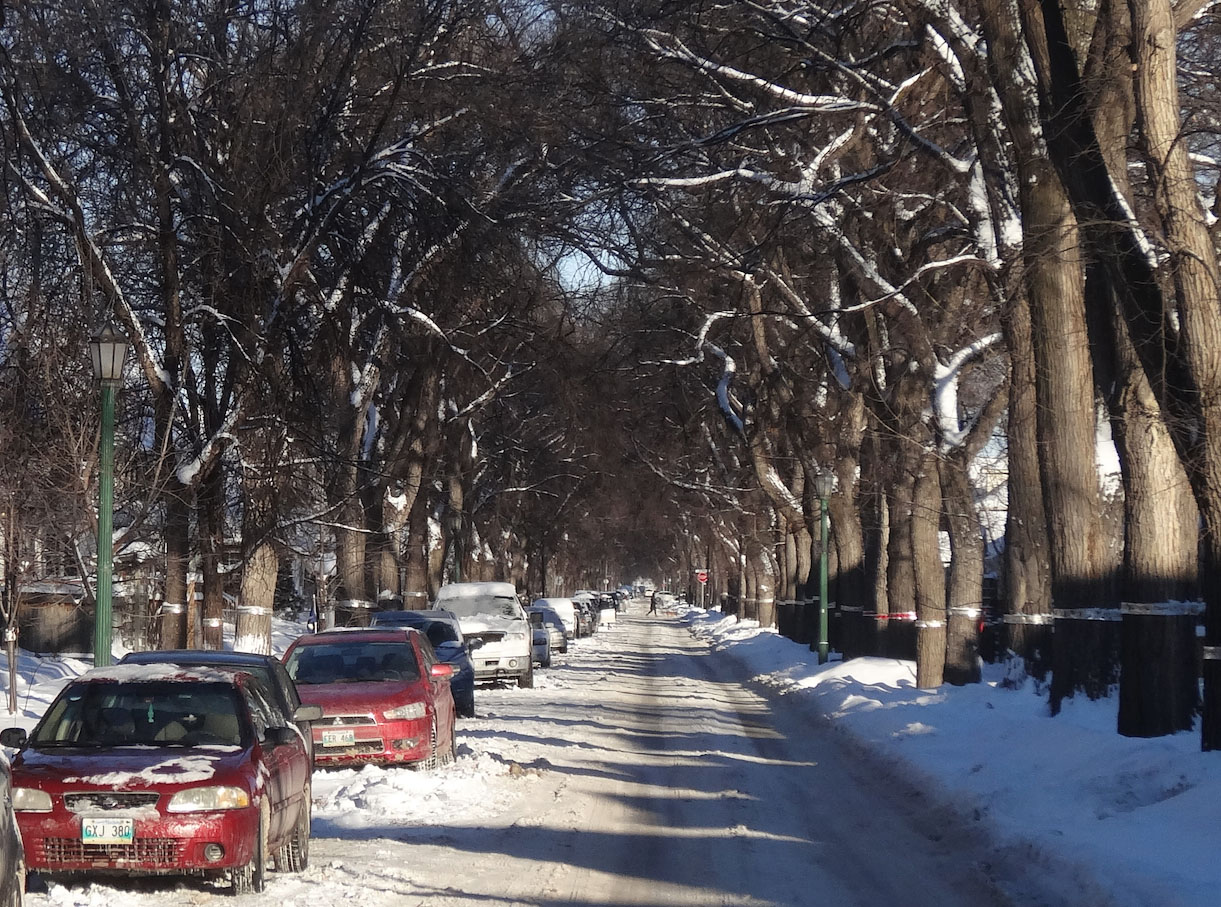
A winter view of Sherburn Street, one of the many tree-lined streets in the West End.

According to the 2021 census, the population of West End was 35,075. The population was 44.6% White, 24.9% Filipino, 17.8% Indigenous, 3.7% Black, and 9% other visible minorities.

Historically, the area has been home to significant German, Scandinavian, and Icelandic communities.

Armstrong's Point is among Winnipeg's most affluent neighbourhoods, with a median household income of $72,000. In contrast, West Broadway, located directly north of Armstrong's Point, has a median household income of $36,000.

== Government ==
At the municipal level, the West End falls within both the Daniel McIntyre and Fort Rouge–East Fort Garry city council wards, represented by Cindy Gilroy and Sherri Rollins, respectively.

The West End is in the province of Manitoba, which redrew its internal electoral boundaries in 2019. The West End is now divided into four electoral districts: Wolseley, St. James, Notre Dame, and Union Station. Each of these districts is currently represented in the Legislative Assembly of Manitoba by members of the NDP of Manitoba: Lisa Naylor (Wolseley), Adrien Sala (St. James), Malaya Marcelino (Notre Dame), and Uzoma Asagwara (Union Station).

At the federal level, the West End is part of the Winnipeg Centre electoral district and is represented by Leah Gazan (NDP).

== History ==
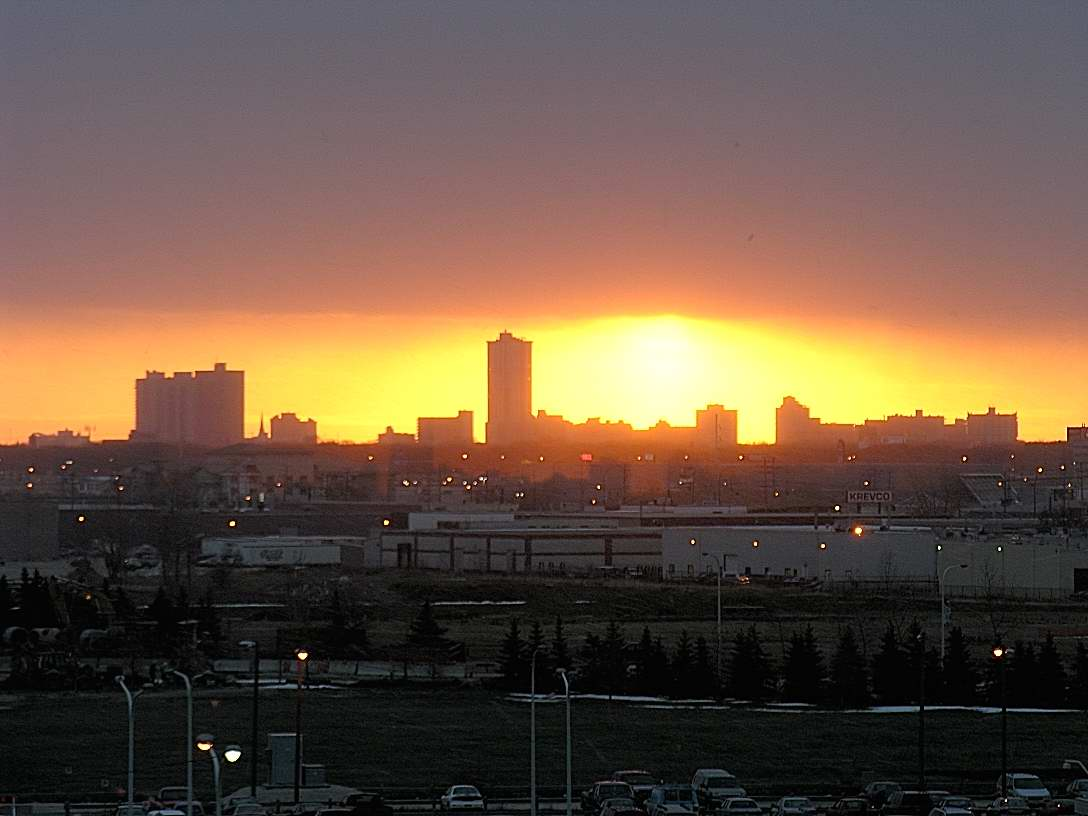
A view of the West End from the airport

The development of the West End as a residential area occurred during two of Winnipeg's major growth periods: 1890–1895 and 1900–1912. Originally part of the Parish of St. James-Assiniboia, the area became part of the City of Winnipeg in 1882 when the city's boundary was extended to St. James Street from Maryland Street (formerly Boundary Road). The development of the area as a working- and middle-class residential neighbourhood began in the late 19th century and continued through the 1920s, by which time the area was fully developed. Due to its proximity to Downtown Winnipeg, the area grew quickly. Unlike Winnipeg's North End, the mainline of the Canadian Pacific Railway does not create a physical barrier between the West End and Downtown. Additionally, the area has access to the city's street railway system, with lines running along Portage Avenue, Sargent Avenue, Sherbrook Street, and Arlington Street. Many West End residents are employed in the industrial area adjacent to the railway spur between Wall and Erin Streets.

In the old City of Winnipeg, the West End was considered Ward Two. It was viewed as the "swing riding" between the affluent and conservative Ward One and the socialist Ward Three, which encompassed the North End and Elmwood.

Following World War II, parts of the West End began to decline as many families moved to the suburbs. Some housing units were converted into rooming houses and became dilapidated. By the 1970s, crime had become an issue in some areas of the West End. However, since the 1980s, the neighbourhood has experienced revitalization efforts. Numerous urban beautification projects have taken place, and in 1987, the West End Cultural Centre was founded in an old church at the corner of Ellice Avenue and Sherbrook Street.

Between 2000 and 2011, the average home price in the West End increased about 31% faster than Winnipeg's overall average. During this period, the average value of a home in the West End rose 12.4% year-over-year. In comparison, the value of an average home in the City of Winnipeg increased 9.5% year-over-year during the same time frame.

== Neighbourhoods ==
The West End includes the following neighbourhoods:

- Armstrong's Point
- Colony
- Daniel McIntyre
- Minto
- Sargent Park
- Spence
- St. Matthews
- West Broadway
- Wolseley

=== Colony ===
Colony takes its name from one of its main roads, Colony Street, which was named for Colony Creek. In the early days of Winnipeg, Colony Creek drained a section of the prairie from near what is now Notre Dame Avenue to the river.

=== Daniel McIntyre ===
Named after Daniel McIntyre, a public official and educator credited with developing Winnipeg's school system. It is bounded to the north by Notre Dame Avenue, east by Victor Street, to the south by Ellice Avenue, and to the west by Ingersoll Street.

=== Minto ===
Named for former Governor General of Canada Gilbert John Elliott Murray, Fourth Earl of Minto (1845–1914).

=== Spence ===
The Spence neighbourhood derives its name from James Spence (1815–1900), a former cooper for the Hudson's Bay Company. Arriving at the Red River Colony in 1841, Spence bought land near the site of Fort Garry and was subsequently incorporated into the limits of the City of Winnipeg. The property included the section of the city north of Armstrong's Point and west of Colony Street.

The Spence neighbourhood has the following boundaries:

- To the north is Notre Dame Avenue, from Victor to Balmoral Street.
- To the west, the boundary runs along Victor Street from Notre Dame to Portage Avenue.
- The boundary extends eastward from Notre Dame to Ellice Avenue along Balmoral. On to Ellice, it continues west until Young Street, from where it goes south until Portage.
- To the south is Portage Avenue, from Victor and Young Street.

=== West Broadway ===
West Broadway encompasses the western portion of Winnipeg's Broadway area, as well as the western edge of downtown Winnipeg overall.

As with Broadway, West Broadway is one of Winnipeg's oldest neighborhoods, with its original homes being built between 1890 and 1913. West Broadway was originally a largely middle-class neighborhood, located to the north of a small, wealthy enclave of Armstrong's Point. During the post-war years, however, the once mixed-income community was met with poverty, crime, and a deteriorating housing stock from the 1960s onward.

== Landmarks and infrastructure ==
The area includes a commemorative plaza and commemorative mural on Valour Road, which honours World War I heroes Corporal Leo Clarke, Sergeant-Major Frederick William Hall, and Lieutenant Robert Shankland, who all grew up on the same city block of Valour Road (then known as Pine Street) and each received a Victoria Cross for bravery.

The Cindy Klassen Recreation Complex, named after local 6-time Olympic medalist Cindy Klassen, is a community fitness centre. It includes a swimming pool, water slide, sauna, weight room, fitness equipment, aerobic studio, indoor running track, outdoor skatepark, lawn bowling, sports fields, and a library, as well as a speed-skating oval in the winter.

The West End also includes more than 1,000 businesses and organizations, including over 150 restaurants. Ellice Avenue, Sherbrook Street, and Sargent Avenue, east of Arlington, have a wide variety of ethnic restaurants and markets. The district is home to many Philippine, Vietnamese, Portuguese, Chinese, East Indian, Somali, Ethiopian, and Thai cuisines. Polo Park, the city's largest mall, is also considered part of the West End. Since the 1990s, the commercial area in the Polo Park district has expanded rapidly by the building of big-box retail outlets, restaurants, and a major hotel. It has now supplanted downtown Winnipeg as the city's main commercial area.

Other attractions in the area include the University of Winnipeg, Vimy Ridge Memorial Park, Omand's Creek and Park, Westview Park, and the Sargent Park Recreation Complex. The district contains many houses, apartment buildings, schools, and an armoury with significant architectural merit. In the summer months, Portage Avenue is the site of the "Sunday Night Cruise" by automobile enthusiasts, which has raised complaints from many West End residents due to the noise and frequent drag racing.

=== West End Cultural Centre ===
West End Cultural Centre
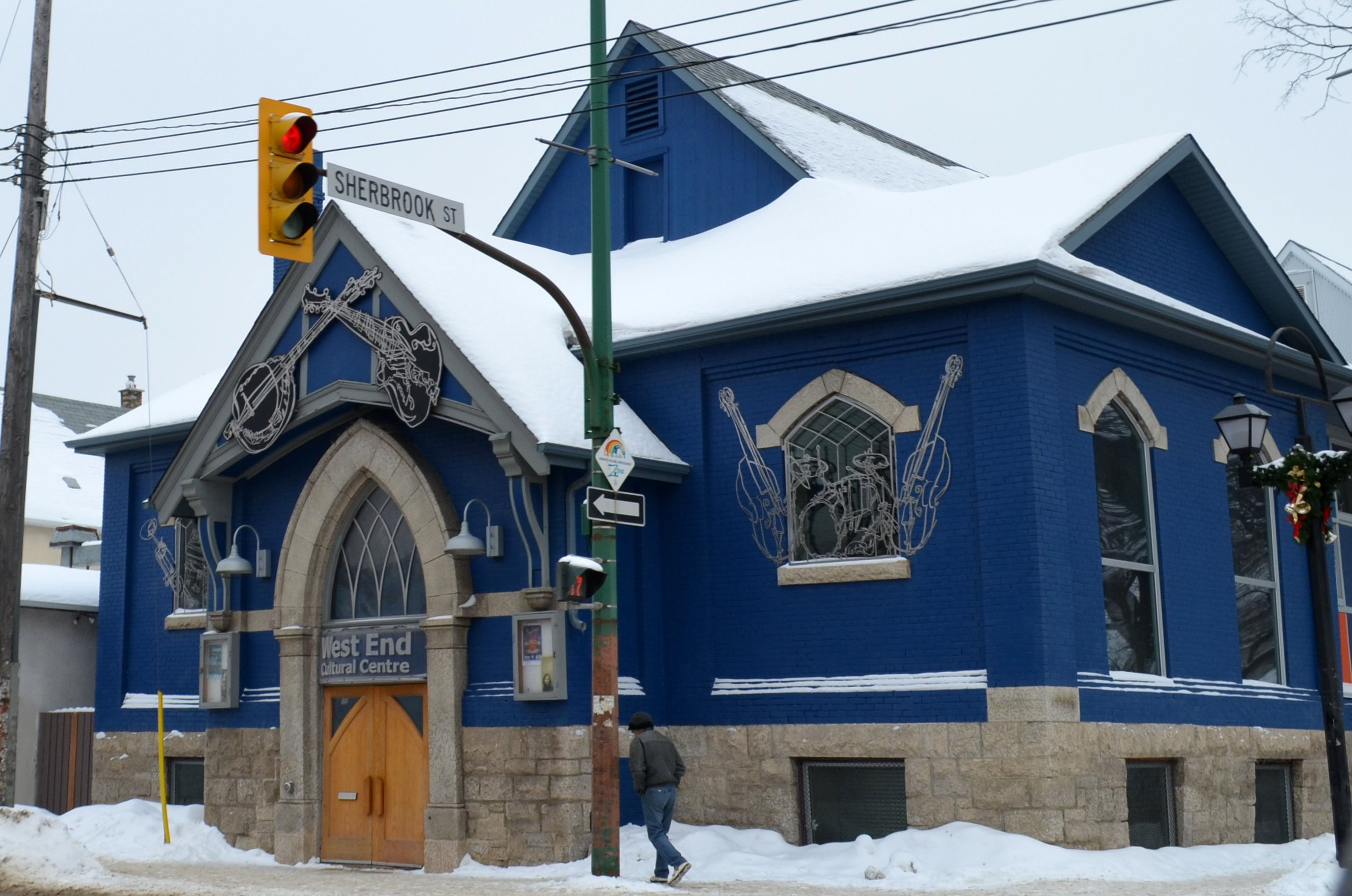

General information
- Location: 586 Ellice Avenue, Winnipeg, MB
- Coordinates: 49.8927821°N 97.1584511°W
- Opened: January 10, 1909 (building); 1987 (WECC)
- Renovated: 2008
- Cost: $15,000 CAD (1909)
- Renovation cost: $4 million

Design and construction
- Architect: Herbert E. Matthews
- Main contractor: B. Pattinson and Thomas Eilbeck

Renovating team
- Architect: Prairie Architects

The West End Cultural Centre (WECC), established in 1987, is the area's main hub for live music and home to Winnipeg Pro Wrestling. It is located on Ellice Avenue in an 80-year-old church building and is referred to as one of the "greenest live performance venues in Canada." It receives support from the federal Department of Canadian Heritage, the Government of Manitoba, the Manitoba Arts Council, the Winnipeg Arts Council, Assiniboine Credit Union, and the University of Manitoba's radio station, 101.5 UMFM.

Prior to the WECC, the building was occupied by:

- St. Matthew's Church (1909–1912)
- Elim Chapel (1914–1928)
- St. Peter's Evangelical Lutheran Church (1931–1969)
- The Portuguese Association of Manitoba (1973–1987)

The Portuguese Association sold the building for CA$131,000 to Winnipeg Folk Festival founder Mitch Podolak and Ava Kobrinsky, who had the vision of opening a community performing arts space modelled on the Vancouver East Cultural Centre. Podolak and Kobrinsky's project is what would become the West End Cultural Centre.

=== Murals ===
The West End has one of the largest collections of outdoor murals in Winnipeg, exceeding 50 in number.

Select murals
Mural name	Commemorating	Location	Year	Artist
Ethiopia	Coffee ceremony of Ethiopia	616 Ellice	2003	Tom Andrich (Eclectic Fine Art)
A Film by Guy Maddin	Guy Maddin	1400 Notre Dame	2006–2020	Charlie Johnston (C5 Artworks)
Power Play	Ice hockey, including Jonathan Toews, Bobby Hull, the Winnipeg Falcons, Winnipeg Jets, and Manitoba Moose	619 Portage	2011	Michel Saint Hilaire, Mandy van Leeuwen
Lionel LeMoine Fitzgerald	Lionel LeMoine Fitzgerald	677 Portage		
In the Zone	2017 Canada Summer Games	966 Portage	2017	Charlie Johnston
A Man Called Intrepid	William Stephenson	626 Sargent	2014	Dave Carty
Valour Road Commemorative Mural	Cpl. Leo Clarke, Sgm. Frederick William Hall, and Lt. Robert Shankland	Valour Road / 1240 Ellice	2008	Charlie Johnston
Philippines	Dr. Jose Rizal	843 Valour Road	2004	Mandy van Leeuwen

== Crime ==
The table below shows the crime rates of various crimes in each of the West End neighbourhoods. The crime data spans five years, from 2017 to 2021. The rates are expressed as crimes per 100,000 residents per year.

Crime Rates per 100,000 people in West End Neighbourhoods, 2017–2021
Neighborhood	Pop.	Homicide	Rate (Note: Rate per 100,000 people per year: Figure is calculated by dividing the total incidences of a crime by the neighbourhood population, then multiplying by 100,000, and then dividing by 5, as the data spans 5 years)	Robbery	Rate	Agr. Aslt.	Rate	Cmn. Aslt.	Rate	Utt. Threat (Note: Abbreviated from: uttering threats)	Rate	Property	Rate
Armstrong Point	370	1	54.1	3	162.2	0	0.0	8	432.4	1	54.1	138	7,459.5
Colony	645	1	31.0	62	1,922.5	63	1,953.5	143	4,434.1	23	713.2	1,072	33,240.3
Daniel McIntyre	10,075	14	27.8	584	1,159.3	637	1,264.5	790	1,568.2	125	248.1	4,436	8,806.0
Minto	5,720	0	0.0	70	244.8	52	181.8	112	391.6	37	129.4	2,469	8,632.9
Sargent Park	6,180	1	3.2	48	155.3	52	168.3	121	391.6	35	113.3	2,447	7,919.1
Spence	4,415	12	54.4	333	1,508.5	562	2,545.9	686	3,107.6	106	480.2	3,394	15,374.9
St. Matthews	5,770	6	20.8	272	942.8	276	956.7	424	1,469.7	112	388.2	4,026	13,954.9
West Broadway	5,010	4	16.0	214	854.3	282	1,125.7	492	1,964.1	100	399.2	3,807	15,197.6
Wolseley	7,805	8	20.5	78	199.9	73	187.1	188	481.7	52	133.2	2,983	7,643.8
West End	45,990	47	20.5	1,664	723.6	1997	868.4	2964	1,289.0	591	257.0	24,772	10,772.8
