= Armstrong's Point =

Neighbourhood in Winnipeg, Manitoba, Canada

- Neighbourhood
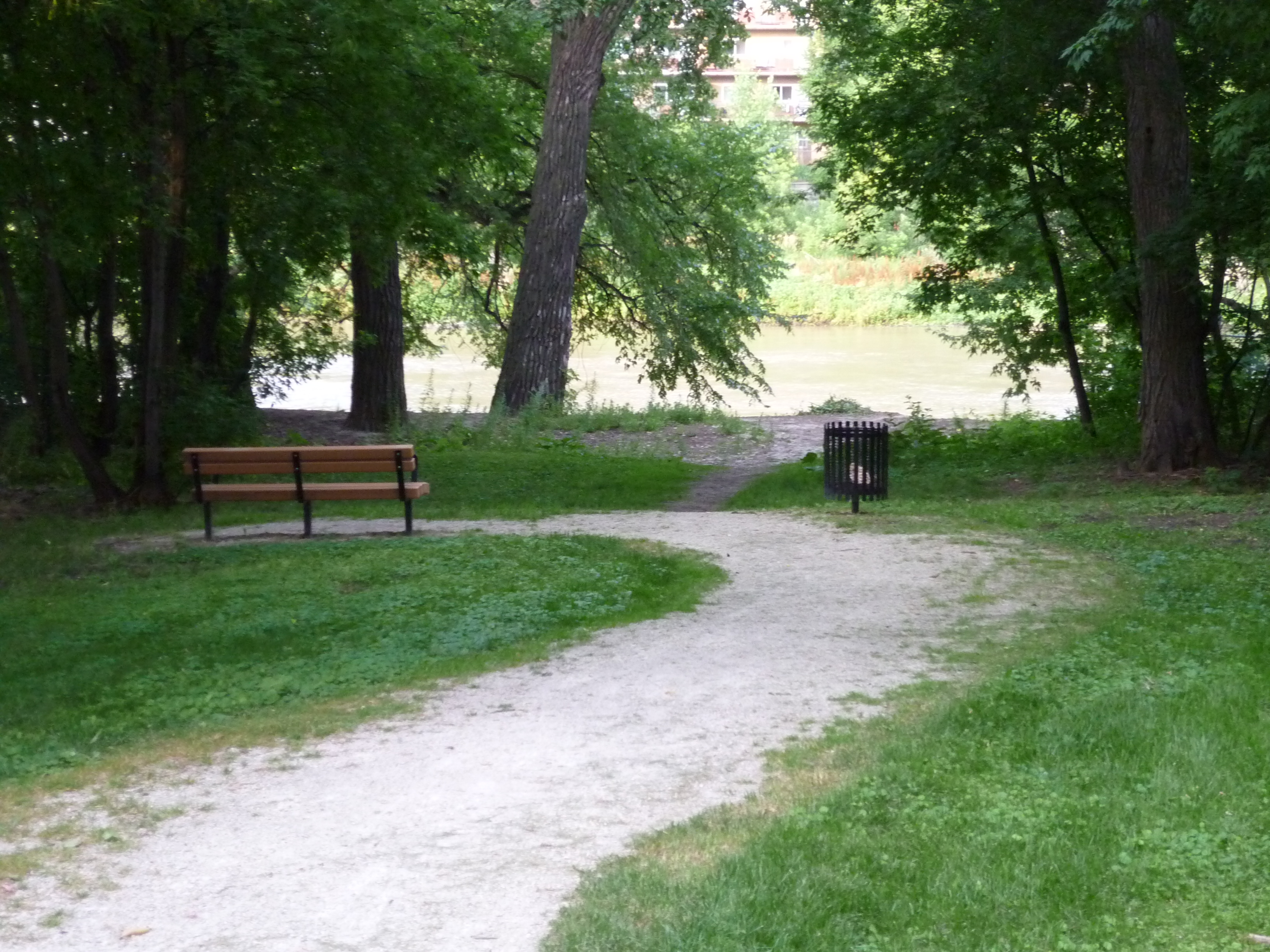
- East Blanchard Park, Winnipeg

- Location within Manitoba
- Coordinates: 49°52′37″N 97°9′23″W
- Country: Canada
- Province: Manitoba
- Established: 1880

Government
  - Councillor: Sherri Rollins
  - MLA: Lisa Naylor
  - MP: Leah Gazan

Area
  - Total: 0.3 km^{2} (0.12 sq mi)
- Elevation: 234 m (768 ft)

Population (2021)
  - Total: 295
  - Density: 1,391.1/km^{2} (3,603/sq mi)
- Time zone: UTC−6 (CST)
  - Summer (DST): UTC−5 (CDT)
- Forward Sortation Area: R3C
- Area codes: 204, 431

Armstrong's Point (informally referred to as The Gates) is a neighbourhood in Winnipeg, Manitoba. It is located in the West End of the city and in a large bend in the Assiniboine River. The land was developed in the late 19th and early 20th centuries as a residential district.

== History ==
The Hudson's Bay Company deeded the land to Joseph Hill who arrived at Red River of the North in 1849 with a Pensioner Regiment. The area was originally called Point-a-Peltier. In 1854, returning to England, Hill put James Armstrong (1790-1874) in charge of the property. Hearing of Hill's death, the property was sold to Francis Evans Cornish, the first mayor of Winnipeg. In the early 1880s, Hill returned to Winnipeg, and reestablished his ownership of the land before selling it to a speculators' syndicate in April 1881 for $28,000. The speculators renamed the area Victoria Place, though officially it was known as Registered Plan 119.

During the period of 1880 through 1920, houses were built on its four roads, Cornish Avenue, East Gate, West Gate, and Middle Gate. The first home was completed in 1882. Today, Armstrong Point provides direct access to the Nestaweya River Trail.

== Architecture ==
Some of the buildings in Armstrong's Point that are historically significant are:

- 20 West Gate, the Cornish Library, completed in 1915
- 40 West Gate, which became the French Consulate
- 54 West Gate, the Ralph Connor House, which became a National Historic Site
- 86 West Gate, which became Westgate Mennonite Collegiate (demolished 1989).
- 134 West Gate, which became the Japanese Consulate
- 158 West Gate, which became St. John's-Ravenscourt School (demolished 1950).

=== Gates ===
The Gates at East Gate, West Gate, Middle Gate, were designed by the architect Lt. Col. Henry Norland Ruttan in 1911, and built in the same year. Flanking three entrances to the Winnipeg neighbourhood, they are nearly identical construction, built of stone and wrought-iron, and of Classical Revival style. Funded by residents and built by the city's engineering department, the Gates are unique, having been built by the property owners instead of a real estate developer.

== Politics ==
Armstrong's Point is represented by Sherri Rollins in the city ward of Fort Rouge - East Fort Garry at the municipal level, Lisa Naylor in the constituency of Wolseley at the provincial level, and Leah Gazan in the constituency of Winnipeg Centre at the federal level. (For census data, Statistics Canada places Armstrong's Point as part of the Downtown community area).

Overall, the neighbourhood is politically diverse and does not generally support any candidate with a large majority. Voter turnout for the 2008 federal election was 56%.

== Demographics ==
Population history
Year	Pop.	±%
1971	535	—
1976	470	−12.1%
1981	420	−10.6%
1986	395	−6.0%
1991	360	−8.9%
1996	330	−8.3%
2001	400	+21.2%
2006	360	−10.0%
2011	380	+5.6%
2016	370	−2.6%
2021	295	−20.3%

As of 2021, the population of the neighbourhood was 295 people. The median household income in Armstrong's Point was $162,000, more than double the median of the city which was $80,000. There was a 0% unemployment rate, and 88.7% of the residents held a post-secondary certificate, diploma, or degree.

There were 125 dwellings in Armstrong's Point, all single detached houses with an average of 9 rooms. 85.2% of the houses were owned, with the average dwelling value being $690,000.
