= Etretat Churchyard =

Cemetery in Normandy, France

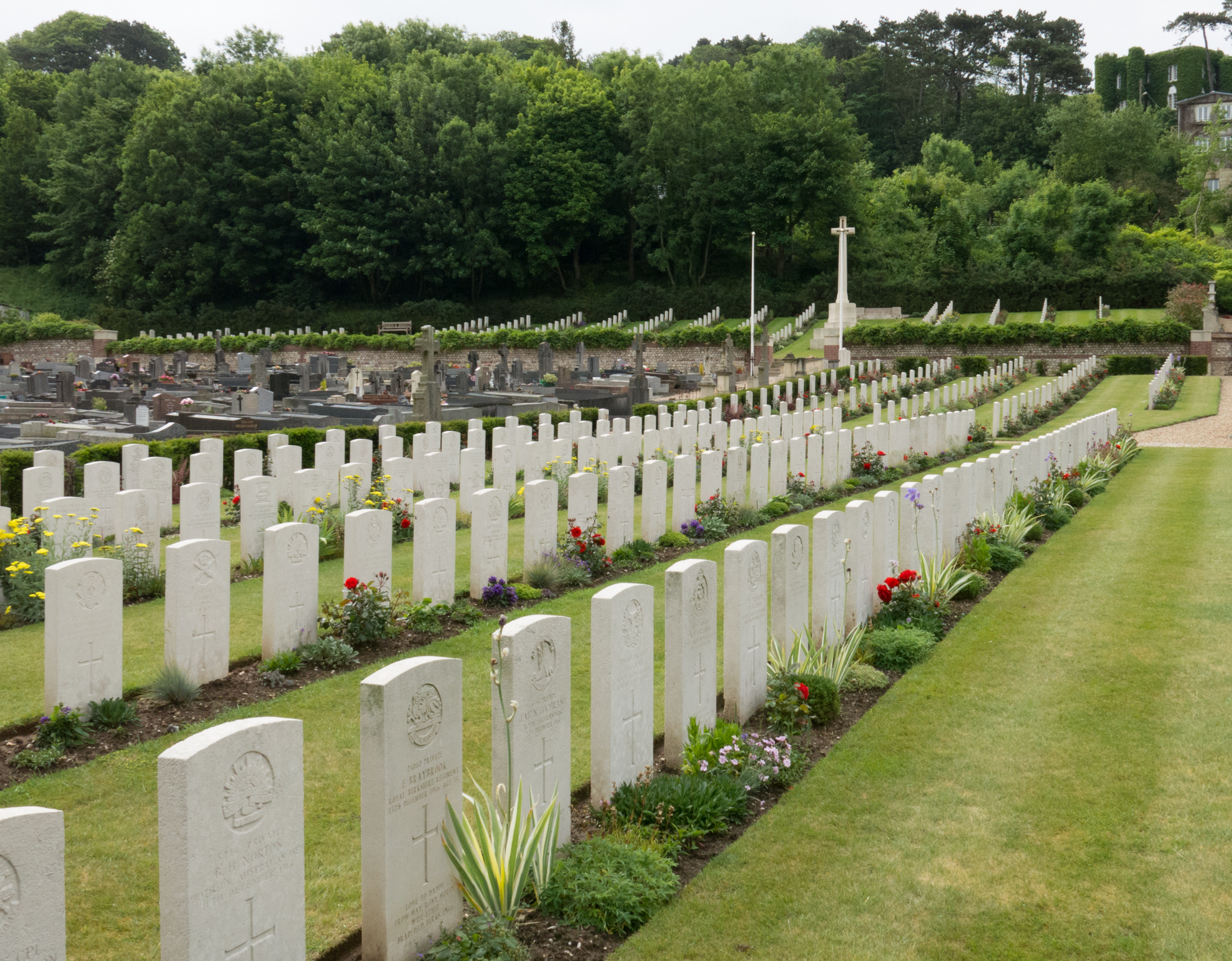
Etretat Churchyard

Etretat Churchyard is a war grave in Étretat, Normandy, France, maintained by the Commonwealth War Graves Commission. It was originally the civil graveyard of Église Notre-Dame (the Church of Our Lady) in that town.

In December 1914, No.1 General Hospital was established in Étretat and it remained until December 1918. The first burials took place among the French civil graves but in February 1915, two plots were set aside for Commonwealth burials in the churchyard. These were filled by December 1916 and from then until December 1918, the extension was used.

Etretat Churchyard itself contains 264 Commonwealth and one German burial from the First World War. Etretat Churchyard Extension contains 282 First World War burials and four from the Second World War. The extension also includes 12 German graves. The extension was designed by Sir Reginald Blomfield.

== Notable interments ==
- Leo Clarke VC (1892–1916), Canadian soldier
- Clarrie Wallach MC (1889–1918), Australian international rugby union player, and soldier
- Arthur Smith MM and bar
- Wilfred Harold Ramsden MM DCM
- Albert Edward Barber MM
- William John Curtis MM
- Frederick Henry Mann MM
- Benjamin King Barnes DCM
- Thomas Bleackley DCM
- T. W. Creed DCM
- L. A. Walford DCM
- Leo Genn CdG (France)-actor

== See also ==
- nl:Etretat Churchyard Extension
