= Westminster United Church =

Protestant Church in Canada

Coordinates: 49.8822°N 97.1616°W

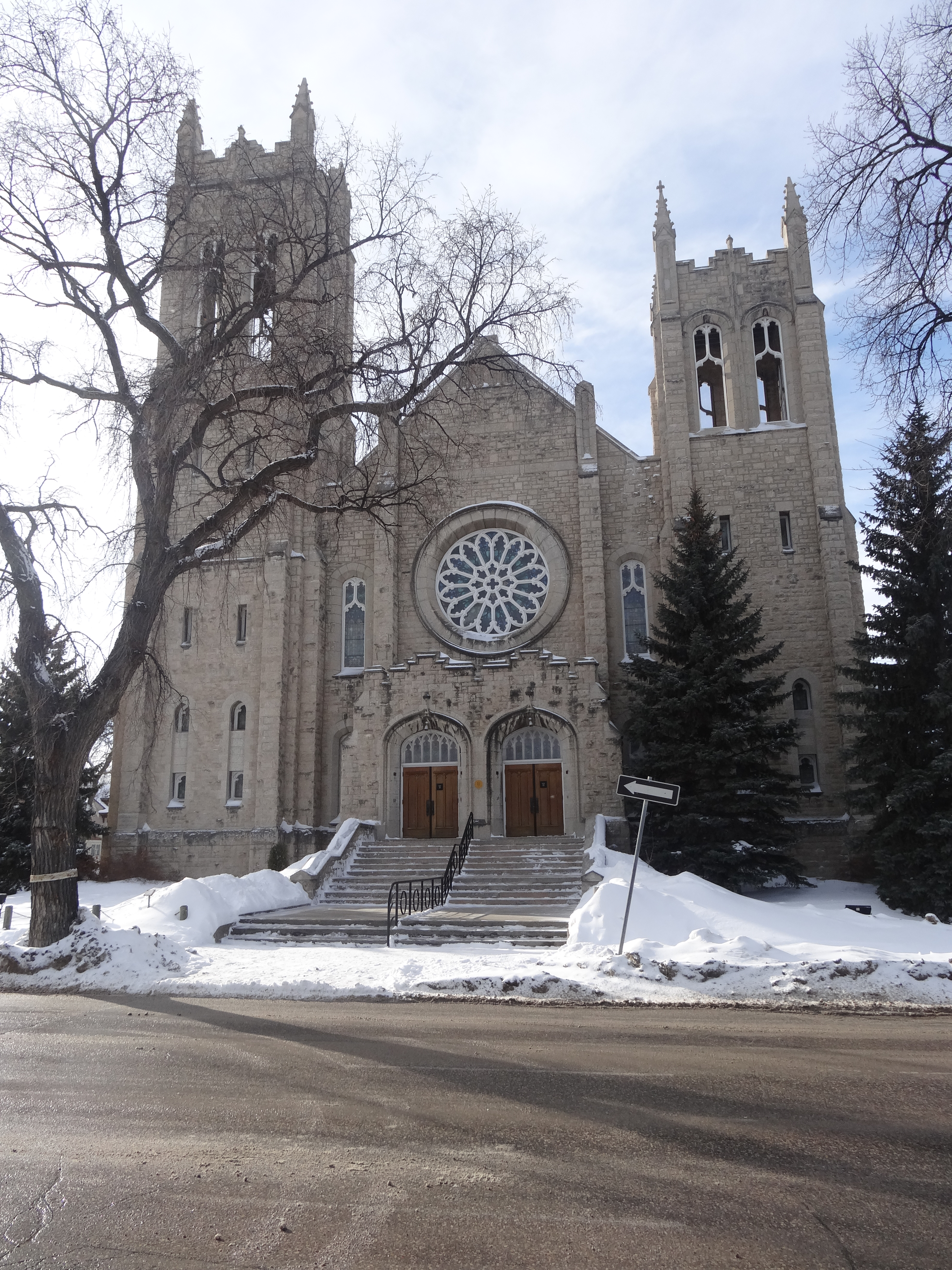
- Wolseley Westminster United Church
- Westminster United Church
- Address: 745 Westminster Avenue Winnipeg, MB
- Country: Canada
- Denomination: United Church of Canada
- Previous denomination: Presbyterian (Until 1925)
- Website: westminsterchurch.org

Architecture
- Heritage designation: Manitoba Provincial Heritage Site
- Architect: J.H.G. Russell
- Style: Beaux-Arts Gothic
- Years built: 1910-1912
- Completed: June 16, 1912

Specifications
- Capacity: 900; 1,100 (Until 2008)

Westminster United Church (formerly Westminster Presbyterian Church) is a Mainline Protestant church in Winnipeg, Manitoba, Canada. It is part of the United Church of Canada. The church was built between 1910 and 1912, and has been recognized for its historical and architectural significance, designated a Manitoba Provincial Heritage Site in 1992 and awarded a Conservation Award in 2020.

The church is located in Winnipeg's Wolseley neighborhood, and is situated at the northwest corner of Maryland street and Westminster Avenue. Its design, high towers and location make it one of the most notable landmarks in Winnipeg's downtown. Drawing on the surrounding community, Westminster United Church is one of the city's largest United Church congregations.

== History ==
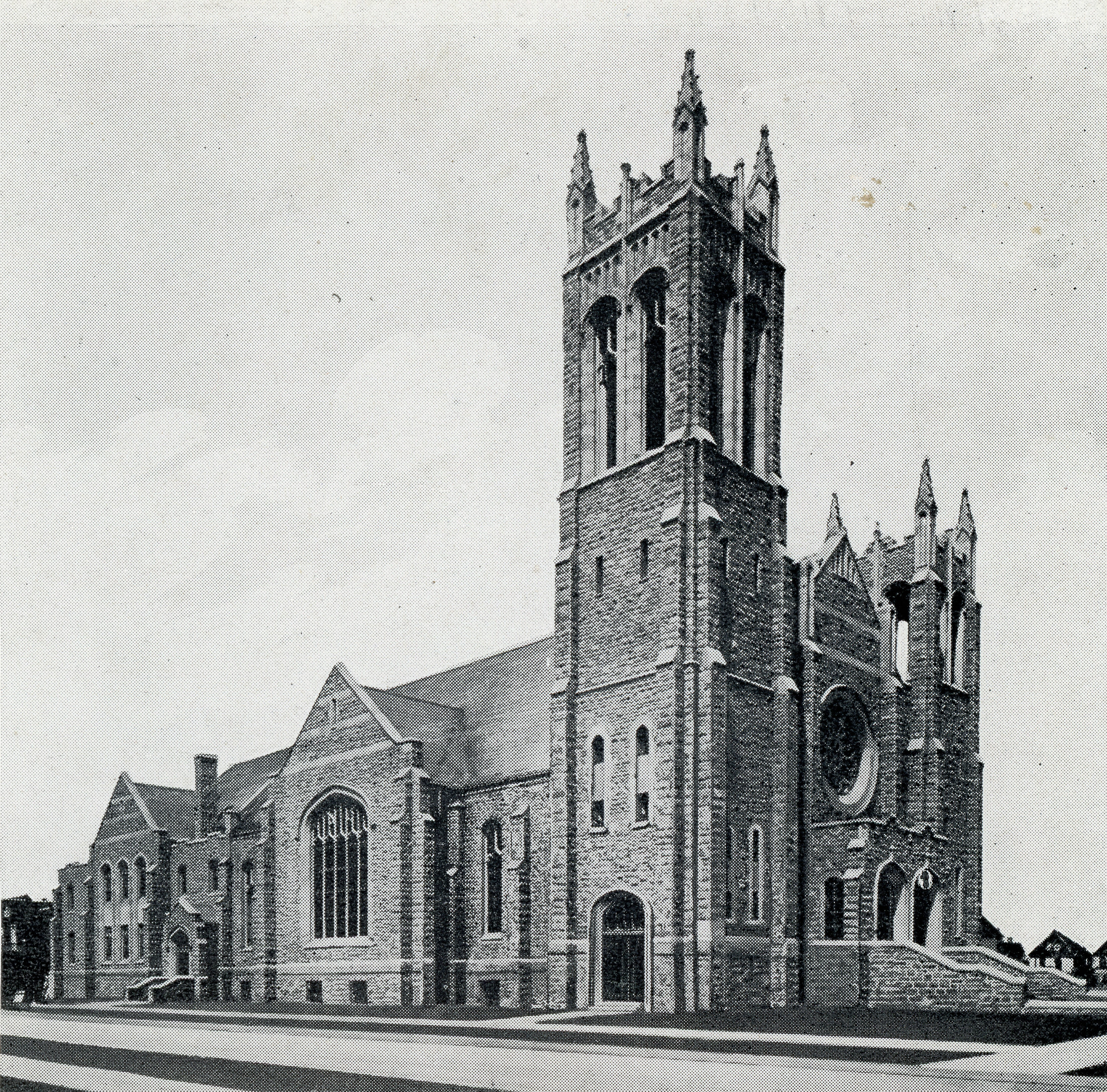
Westminster Presbyterian Church in 1912.

In 1892, members of St. Andrew's Presbyterian Church decided to found a more centrally located church, and on January 1, 1893, Westminster Presbyterian Church held its first service. However, during the early 20th century, Winnipeg's population grew dramatically as did the memberships of churches across the city. By 1909, the members of Westminster Church decided that they would need to construct larger facilities to accommodate their congregation of almost one thousand. Architect John Hamilton Gordon Russell was chosen to design the new church. The church was designed in the Late Gothic Revival style and cost $158,603.77 to build. In 1910, the congregation began meeting in the basement of the unfinished church as the remainder of the structure was being built. On April 29, 1911, the Governor General, Earl Grey laid the cornerstone and the church was fully constructed by June 1912. The new church was officially opened on June 16, 1912.

In 1925, most Presbyterian, Methodist, and Congregational churches in Canada came together to form the United Church of Canada. Westminster Presbyterian then held a vote whether to join the new church. At the time, the church had 1,133 members and of those 569 voted to join the United Church. 129 voted against; of those opposed, 124 left the church, with most joining Presbyterians from other downtown churches to form a new congregation; First Presbyterian. After the vote, the church was renamed Westminster United Church.

In 1958–59, the church underwent $43,000 worth of interior and exterior renovations.

In 1968, the Westminster Foundation was created to help maintain and repair the church building.This was done in anticipation of future financial hardship despite finances being stable at the time. On March 31, 1992, the church was designated a Provincial Heritage Site. In 2020, the church received a Conservation Award from Heritage Winnipeg. Westminster United Church remains one of Winnipeg's largest United Church congregations.

== Architecture ==
The main facade faces east onto Maryland street. The church features a stained glass rose window above the front entrance which is centred between two towers. These towers are of different heights, with the south tower measuring 100 feet and the north tower measuring 70 feet.

=== Interior ===
The church contains a Casavant Frères pipe organ, which is one of the largest in the city. The capacity was originally 1,100, but due to the installation of a stage in 2008, the church now has a capacity of 900. The basement contains a gymnasium and a daycare space. The church also contains two memorial plaques commemorating members of the congregation who died during the First and Second World Wars.
