= Wolseley, Winnipeg =

Neighbourhood in Winnipeg, Manitoba, Canada

Coordinates: 49°52′54″N 97°10′26″W

Wolseley
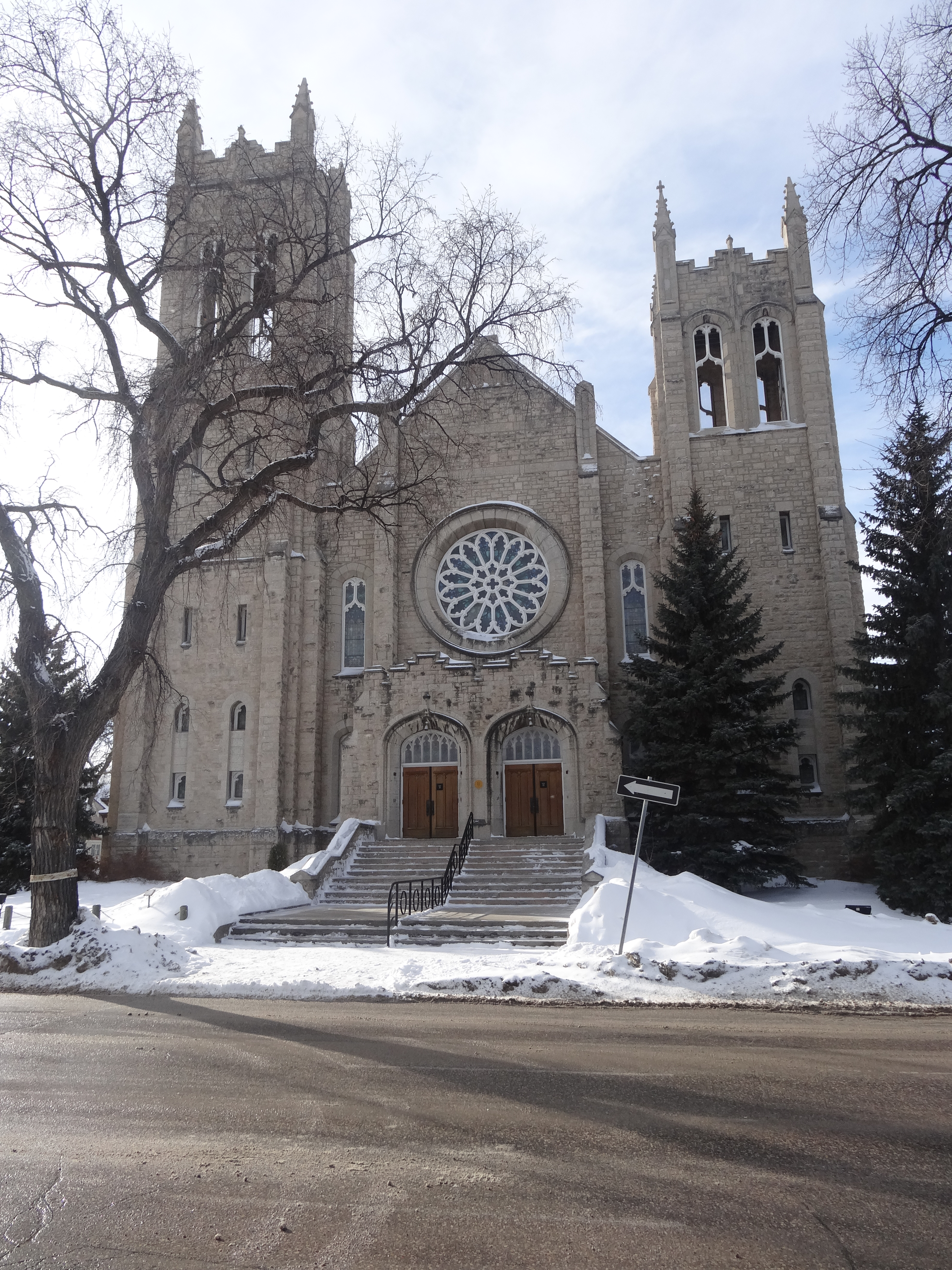
- Westminster United Church in Wolseley, opened in 1912.
- Interactive map of Wolseley
- Country: Canada
- Province: Manitoba
- City: Winnipeg

Government
  - MLA: Lisa Naylor (NDP)
  - City Councillor: Cindy Gilroy

Population (2021)
  - Total: 7,735

Wolseley is a neighbourhood located within the West End of Winnipeg, Manitoba. It is named for field marshal Sir Garnet Wolseley, a British Army officer who came to Manitoba in 1870 to suppress the Red River Rebellion. It is affectionately known as "The Granola Belt" of Winnipeg.

== History ==
The area that is now called Wolseley was originally part of the Parish of St. James, and was annexed into the City of Winnipeg in 1882. It was developed primarily between 1905 and 1930 as a middle and upper middle class residential area.

Wolseley was home to an amusement park for several years before it closed permanently in 1922. Happyland included a 90-metre Doric-style entrance, a roller coaster, ballroom, Japanese tea gardens, Ferris wheel, and a 240-metre circular swing.

Beginning in the 1950s, Wolseley began to change as many upper-middle-class families left the area to settle in Winnipeg's suburbs. Many of the homes were subdivided into rooming houses. In the 1970s and 1980s, the large houses, central location, and low real estate prices enticed many young people to return to Wolseley. This new Wolseley generation were largely artistic and socially active young adults who began rejuvenating and gentrifying the area. During this time, the area became affectionately known as "The Granola Belt". Today, Wolseley is once again seen as a desirable residential area, and is one of the most intact pre-1930 residential areas in Canada.

A community history, Rising to the Occasion, covering the neighbourhoods of Wolseley, West Broadway, and Armstrong's Point, was published in 2000 as a millennium project of the Robert A. Steen Community Centre.

== Area and population ==
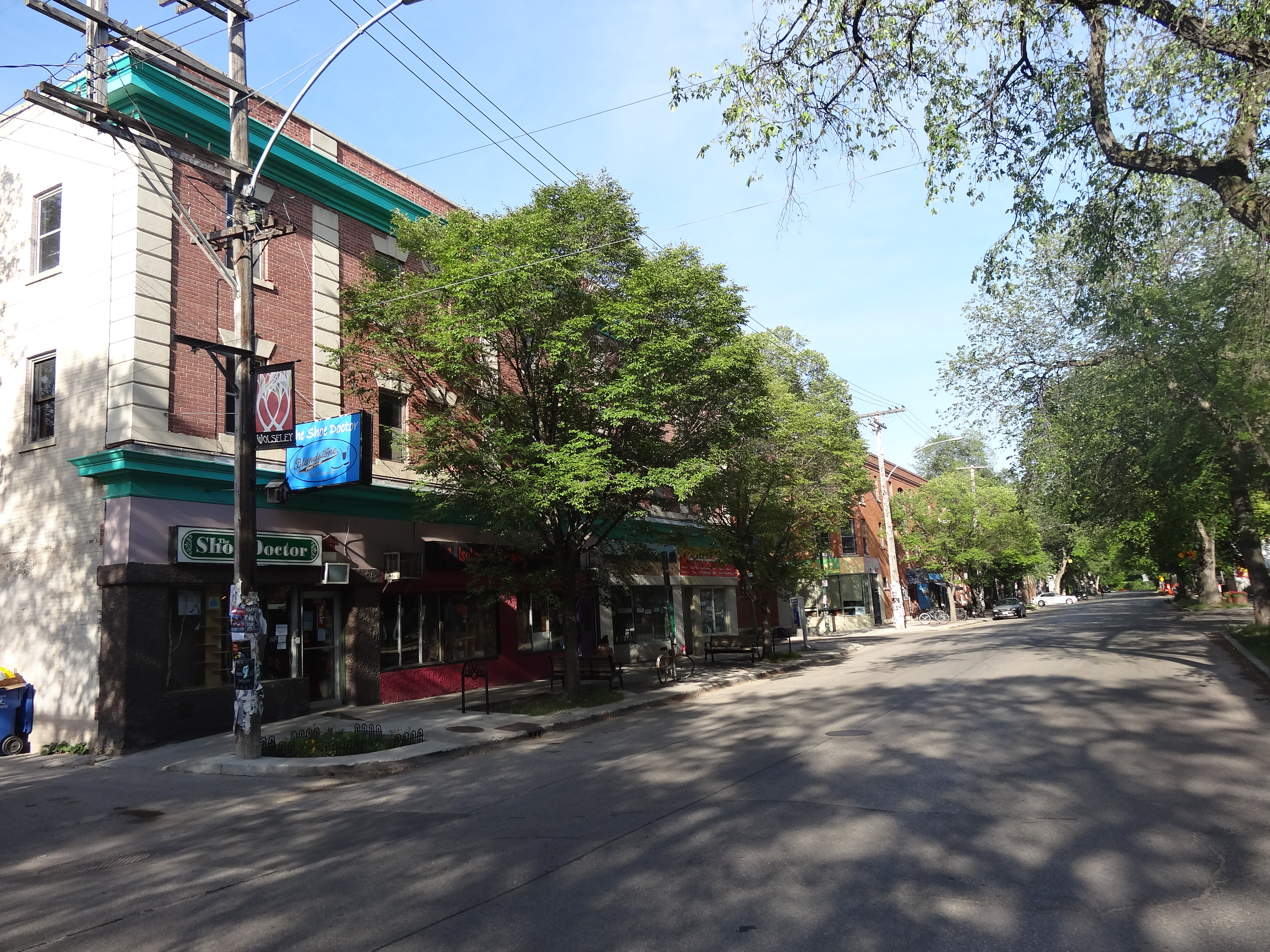
A view looking east at the shops down Westminster Avenue on summer's evening.

The neighbourhood of Wolseley is bounded on the south by the Assiniboine River, on the west by Omand's Creek, on the north by Portage Avenue and on the east by Maryland Street. The electoral district of Wolseley has wider boundaries to the north and west, and includes more of the West End and a part of St. James.

As of the 2021 City of Winnipeg Census (data for 2020), the neighbourhood has a population of 7,735, of which 12.4% reported Indigenous Identity and 11.6% were visible minorities. The average household income is $96,400, or a median of $76,500. 57.5% of dwellings in the area are owned, while 42.5% are rented.

It is locally famous for the "Wolseley Elm," a prominent neighbourhood tree which was threatened with destruction in 1957 though it was spared due to the efforts of several neighbourhood women until 1960 when it was cut down.

Businesses in Wolseley's small shopping district on Westminster Avenue cater to the politically and socially active nature of Wolseley residents. Businesses include an organic food mart, organic bakery, bookstore, juice bar, yarn shop, restaurant, barber, yoga studio, and independent convenience grocery stores. Harvest Collective, an organic food buying collective, ran as a not-for-profit organization for 21 years. Four years after Harvest went bankrupt, Organic Planet Workers Co-op was founded in 2003 and re-opened the shop on Westminster.
