= Minto Armoury =

Coordinates: 49°53′26.8″N 97°10′44.0″W

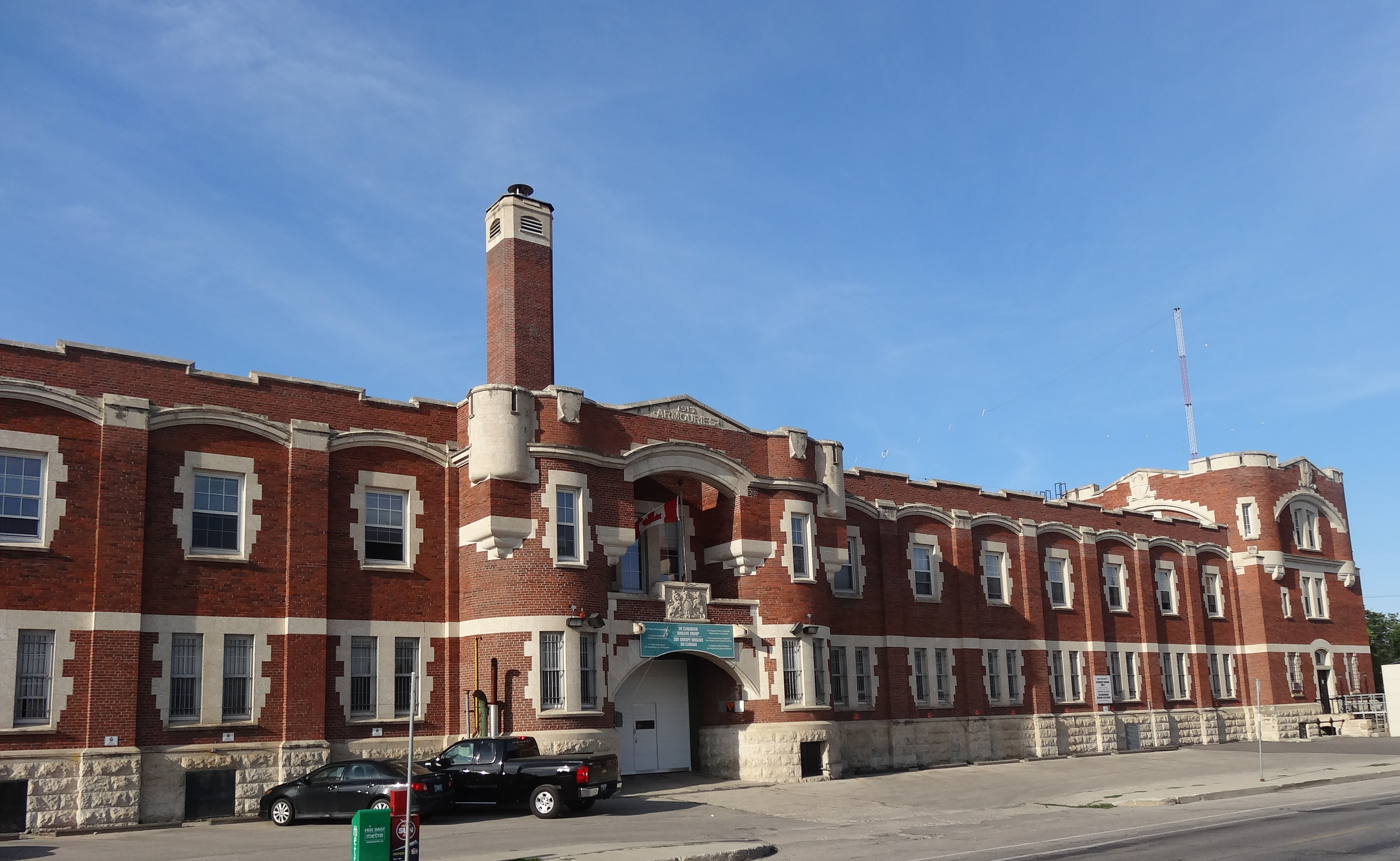
- View of the Minto Armoury from the southeast of the building on St. Matthews.

General information
- Type: Drill Hall / armoury
- Architectural style: Tudor Revival
- Location: Winnipeg, Manitoba, 969 St. Matthews
- Current tenants: The Royal Winnipeg Rifles, Queen's Own Cameron Highlanders of Canada, 38 Signal Regiment
- Construction started: 1914
- Completed: 1915
- Owner: Canadian Forces

Design and construction
- Architects: David Ewart, Chief Dominion Architect

National Historic Site of Canada
- Official name: Minto Armoury National Historic Site of Canada
- Designated: 1991

The Minto Armoury is a prominent and historic structure in the West End of Winnipeg, Manitoba. The armoury is currently the home base of The Royal Winnipeg Rifles, The Queen's Own Cameron Highlanders of Canada, 38 Signal Regiment, and several other reserve units. The building remains an active military structure. It is noted for its smooth integration into the character of the neighbourhood and remains a local landmark, both factors have helped to certify the Minto Armoury as a Recognized Federal Heritage Building.

== Architecture ==
The armoury was designed by Chief Dominion Architect David Ewart, and was opened the next year and work on the structure was completed in 1915. The Minto Armoury is an example of Tudor Revival architecture designed by Fuller. It has Canada's standard fortress motif with square corner towers and the arched entrance. The distinctive red bricks that were part of the buildings design were originally produced by the Sidney Brickworks company, the company's bricks were also used on important sites such as the St. Edward's Roman Catholic Church on Arlington Street in Winnipeg.

== History ==
A fire destroyed the original wooden roof structure on January 22, 1956. Most of the regimental trophies and records, musical instruments, kilts, and rifles were rescued from the fire as responders got to the scene. The roof was then replaced with its current steel truss structure that is in use today. The building was designated a National Historic Site of Canada in 1991.

== See also ==
- List of Armouries in Canada
