= Westgate Mennonite Collegiate =

Location
- 86 West Gate; Winnipeg, Manitoba, R3C 2E1; Canada; 49.8766°N 97.1589°W

Information
- Type: Private secondary (English language)
- Established: 1958
- Principal: James Friesen
- Grades: 6–12
- Enrollment: 331 (2018)
- Campus: 86 West Gate
- Website: www.westgatemennonite.ca

Westgate Mennonite Collegiate is a grade 6 to 12 Mennonite private school in Winnipeg, Manitoba.

== History ==
Westgate Mennonite Collegiate, which was originally called the Mennonite Educational Institute, was formed in 1958. The school originally had two teachers, one who taught grade 7 and 8, and the other who taught grade 9 to 11. Classes were held in First Mennonite Church before moving to a vacant church building on Edison Avenue. The school moved to its current location on 86 West Gate in 1964 and then they were able to offer more programs. A gymnasium, multi-purpose room, and office space were built in 1978. This allowed Westgate to continue its choir and add a band program, as well as several extra-curricular activities and electives. The old building was replaced in 1989 with the current one that had labs and more classroom space.

In 2008, the school's proposed expansion plans were rejected by the city of Winnipeg. Subsequently, the school developed plans to relocate to a more central location. In 2012 the school applied again for city approval of a smaller (but still substantial) redevelopment at its current location, and in March 2012 the school received approval from the board of adjustment.

In the 2016–2017 school year, they performed their renovation, and completed it in time for the 2017–2018 school year.

== Athletics ==
Coach Karl Wiebe, a coach at Westgate since 1983, was named coach of the year by the Manitoba High Schools Athletic Association in 2010, after leading the Westgate boys' basketball team to two provincial championships. Westgate plays in zone 2 (SCAC) in the Manitoba High Schools Athletics Association. From 2001 to 2012, Westgate Mennonite Collegiate won 8 National skiing championships.
