= Frederick Coppins =

Canadian Victoria Cross recipient (1889-1963)

Frederick George Coppins VC
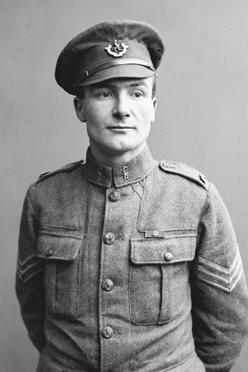
- Born: 25 October 1889; Charing, Kent, England
- Died: 20 March 1963 (aged 73); Livermore, California, United States
- Burial place: Chapel of the Chimes columbarium, Oakland, California
- Military career
- Allegiance: United Kingdom; Canada
- Branch: British Army; Canadian Expeditionary Force
- Service years: 1914–1919
- Rank: Corporal
- Units: Queen's Own (Royal West Kent Regiment); 8th (Winnipeg Rifles) Battalion, CEF
- Conflicts: First World War
- Awards: Victoria Cross

Frederick George Coppins VC (25 October 1889 – 20 March 1963) was a Canadian recipient of the Victoria Cross, the highest and most prestigious award for gallantry in the face of the enemy that can be awarded to British and other Commonwealth forces. He was born in Charing, Kent, England and served with the Queen's Own (Royal West Kent Regiment) prior to the outbreak of the First World War. He emigrated to Canada, settling in Winnipeg. He was living in Edmonton at the time of enlistment. He signed up to the 19th Alberta Dragoons.

== Details ==
He was 28 years old, and a corporal in the 8th Battalion, Canadian Expeditionary Force during the Battle of Amiens when the following deed took place for which he was awarded the VC.

On 9 August 1918 at Hatchet Woods, near Amiens, France, Corporal Coppins' platoon came unexpectedly under fire of numerous machine-guns. It was not possible to advance or retire and there was no cover. Corporal Coppins, calling on four men to follow him, leapt forward in the face of intense machine-gun fire and rushed straight for the guns. The four men with him were killed and he was wounded, but going on alone, he killed the operator of the first gun and three of the crew and took four prisoners. Despite his wound, he then continued with his platoon to the final objective.

== Later life ==
After the war, he returned to Winnipeg. He enlisted as a special constable during the Winnipeg General Strike. Within hours of his appointment, he charged his horse into a gathering of strikers and was dragged off his horse and severely pummelled.

Coppins played a minor role in the 1930 film All Quiet on the Western Front, as a German machine gunner.

A record shows his enlistment in World War II at Angel's Camp Calaveras Co., California, aged 50, but it is unknown what role he played.

He was living in California when he died.

Coppins' medals are located in a collection at the Royal Winnipeg Rifles Museum, Winnipeg, Manitoba.

A paving stone commemorating Coppins was unveiled in Charing in 2018.
