= Leo Clarke (VC) =

Canadian recipient of the Victoria Cross (1892–1916)

Lionel Beaumaurice Clarke VC
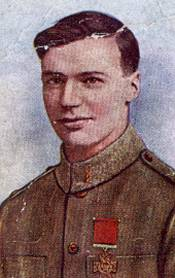
- Born: 1 December 1892; Waterdown, Ontario, Canada
- Died: 19 October 1916 (aged 23); Étretat, France
- Burial place: Etretat Churchyard
- Military career
- Branch: Canadian Expeditionary Force
- Service years: 1915–1916
- Rank: Sergeant
- Nickname: Leo
- Units: 2nd (Eastern Ontario Regiment) Battalion, CEF
- Conflicts: First World War: Battle of the Somme; Battle of Flers-Courcelette; Capture of Regina Trench (DOW)
- Awards: Victoria Cross

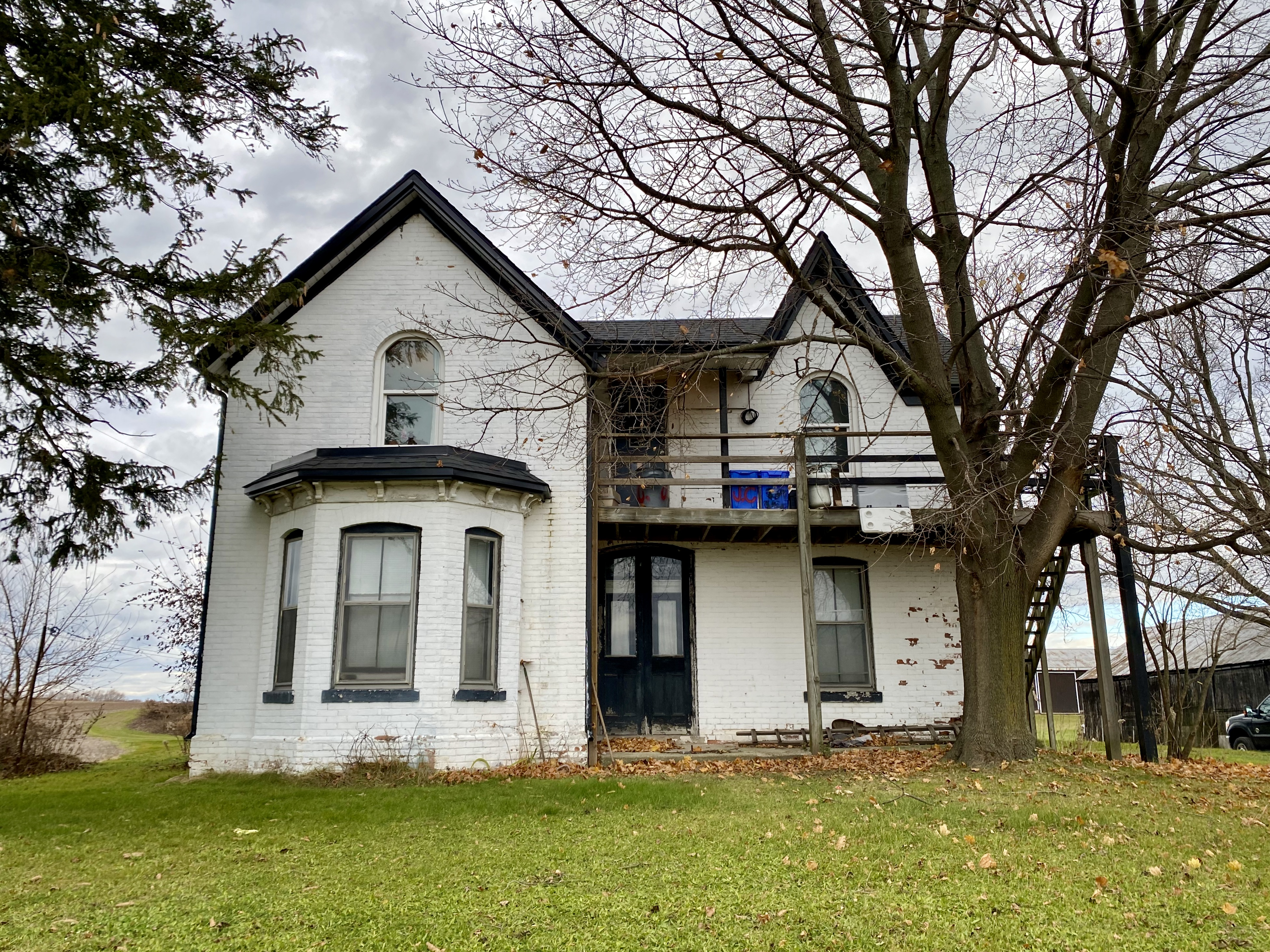
Birthplace of Leo Clarke near Waterdown, Ontario

Lionel Beaumaurice Clarke VC (1 December 1892 – 19 October 1916) was the twentieth Canadian recipient of the Victoria Cross, the highest and most prestigious award for gallantry in the face of the enemy that can be awarded to British and Commonwealth forces.

== Early life ==
Clarke was born on the 5th Concession Road (Con 5 - Lot 10), near Waterdown, Ontario. He spent his early years in England, home of his parents Henry Trevelyan Clarke and Rosetta Caroline Nona Clarke, but returned and settled in Winnipeg in about 1903.

When World War I started, he was working as a surveyor for the Canadian Northern Railway in the Canadian north. He returned to Winnipeg to enlist in the 27th Battalion, and after arriving in England in June 1915, transferred to the 2nd (Eastern Ontario Regiment) Battalion, Canadian Expeditionary Force, to be with his brother, Charles.

== Victoria Cross ==
The main assault of the Battle of Flers-Courcelette was scheduled for 15 September 1916. Its objective was to occupy a chain of trenches between Martinpuich and Courcelette. On 1 September 1916, Clarke's battalion was charged with capturing a 50-yard-long salient between the Canadian position at Mouquet Farm and Courcelette to the north.

On 9 September 1916, near Pozières, France, the first three companies of Clarke's battalion went over the top, leaving the fourth in reserve. Clarke, an acting corporal at the time, was assigned to take a section to clear the enemy on the left flank to allow his company sergeant to build a fortified dugout that would secure the Canadian position once the salient was overrun. When his section reached the trench, it was so heavily defended that they had to battle their way through with hand grenades, bayonets and their rifles as clubs. Clarke was the only man left standing; the rest had either been killed or wounded.

At that time, about 20 Germans, including two officers, counter-attacked. Clarke advanced, emptying his revolver into their ranks. He then picked up two enemy rifles and fired those too. One of the officers attacked with a bayonet, wounding Clarke in the leg, but Clarke shot him dead. The Germans retreated, but Clarke pursued, shooting four more and capturing a fifth. In all, Clarke killed 19 of the enemy, capturing one.

The citation in The London Gazette reads:

"No. 73132 Private (Acting Corporal) Leo Clarke, Can. Inf.

For most conspicuous bravery. He was detailed with his section of bombers to clear the continuation of a newly-captured trench and cover the construction of a "block." After most of his party had become casualties, he was building a "block" when about twenty of the enemy with two officers counter-attacked. He boldly advanced against them, emptied his revolver into them and afterwards two enemy rifles which he picked up in the trench.

One of the officers then attacked him with the bayonet, wounding him in the leg, but he shot him dead. The enemy then ran away, pursued by Acting Corporal Clarke, who shot four more and captured a fifth.

Later he was ordered to the dressing-station, but returned next day to duty."

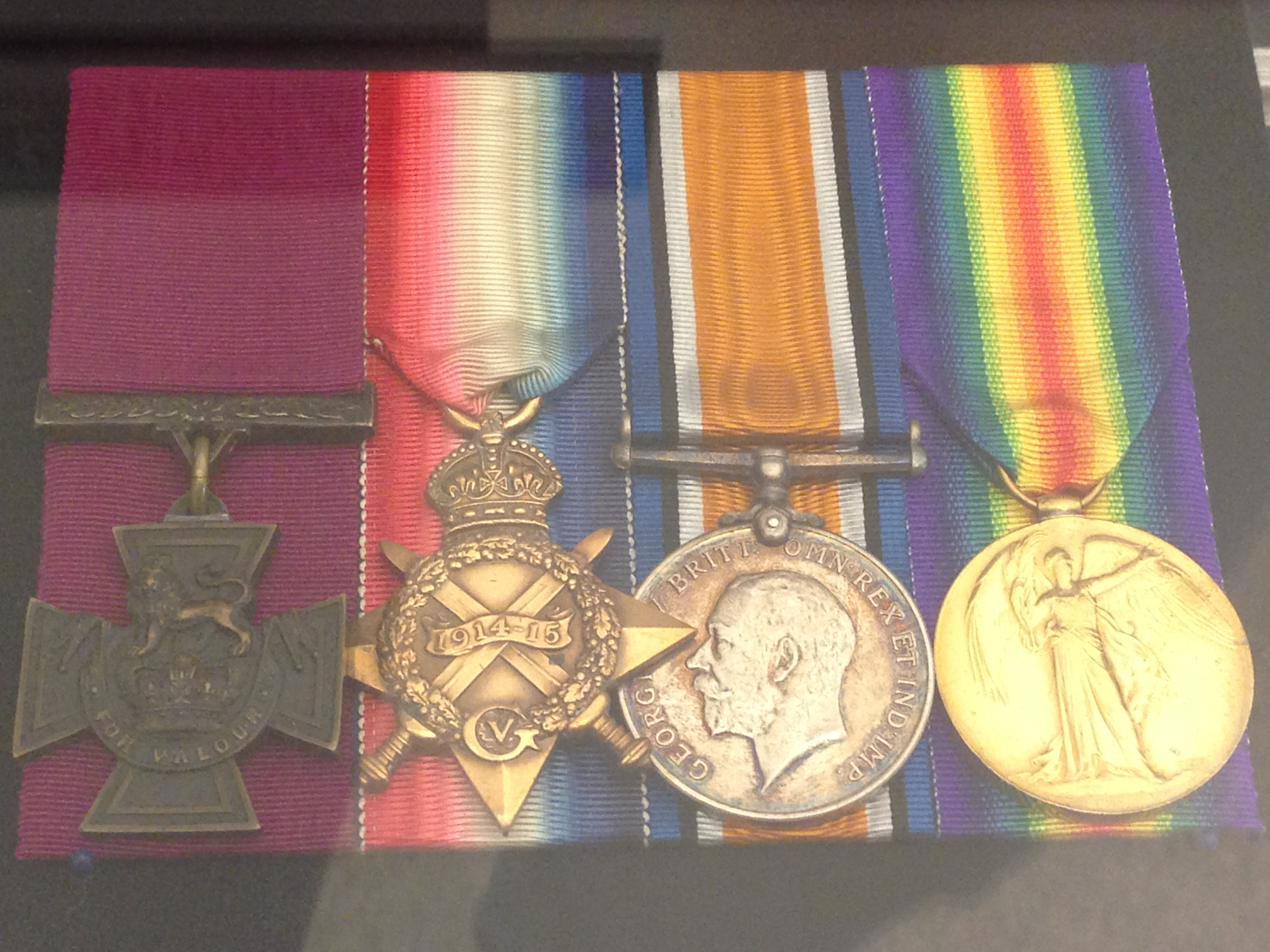
Medals of Leo Clarke while on loan at the Manitoba Museum, Winnipeg, in 2014

=== Variation from The London Gazette citation ===
The account in The London Gazette differed from the experiences related by Leo Clarke to his brother Charles (Charlie) while recuperating shortly after the events of 9 September 1916.

As an acting corporal, Clarke was not permitted to have, wear, or use a side-arm, however he had won a Colt Model 1905 Marine Corps and two extra magazines from a group of U.S. soldiers in a card game. As this sidearm was neither of British Expeditionary Force issue, nor sanctioned for use by infantrymen, it was neither referenced officially nor represented correctly in the tinplate engraving which accompanied the Gazette article—it was represented as a Webley Revolver (a British weapon).

The account in The London Gazette had Acting Corporal Clarke 'advancing' however, per Clarke's recounting to his brother, he held his position in the trench and while bracing himself against the side (as he still had a bayonet through his thigh), Clarke took steady aim and shot them dead one by one as the enemy rounded a turn some distance away—claiming one life for each of the 21 rounds he had. It was once his pistol was empty, he picked up a German rifle and proceeded down the trench and after making the turn where the Germans had come, he found several soldiers, a sergeant, and an officer. He demanded their surrender but the officer ordered the men to fight. Clarke shot him dead and the remaining soldiers surrendered. It was only after he returned to his own lines with the prisoners that he—and his prisoners—discovered that the rifle he carried was empty.

According to his brother Charles, the actions of the day (and the shooting one by one of the soldiers with the side-arm) troubled Leo deeply that The London Gazette account wasn't challenged, but contributed to Clarke's lack of enthusiasm for the honour. Charles Clarke completed an unpublished memoir (still in the hands of the Clarke family) which was a source for the 2014 book Valour Road.

== Death ==
Grave in Etretat Churchyard

On 11 October 1916, Sergeant Clarke's battalion was ordered forward to secure the newly captured Regina Trench which was under heavy enemy artillery fire. Clarke was crouching in a hole at the rear of a trench when a shell exploded and the back of the trench caved in, burying him. His brother dug him out, but Clarke was paralyzed; the weight of the earth had crushed his back and injured his spine.

Clarke was taken to No. 1 General Hospital at Étretat but died on 19 October. He is buried in Plot II, Row C, Grave 3A, in Etretat Churchyard, 16 miles north of Le Havre, France. According to a contemporary newspaper article, shortly before his death he wrote to his parents, stating: "I don't care so much for the Victoria Cross as getting home for a couple of months."

== Legacy ==
Clarke was posthumously awarded the Victoria Cross in February 1917. Clarke’s father, Henry, received his son’s VC at a presentation at the corner of Portage and Main in Winnipeg. For the first time, the Governor General of Canada, the Duke of Devonshire, travelled to make a personal presentation of the award at a ceremony attended by about 30,000 people. Henry Clarke also received a letter from King George V, commending his son for his courageous actions.

In 1925, Pine Street in West End, Winnipeg, was renamed Valour Road in honour of Clarke and fellow Victoria Cross winners Frederick William Hall and Robert Shankland, all of whom lived on the 700 block.

A plaque in his honour was erected by the Ontario Heritage Foundation at the Royal Canadian Legion branch in Waterdown.

Clarke's story was featured in a Heritage Minutes vignette, which was run nationally in Canada.

The legacy of remembrance continues in the Clarke family as Charles Clarke (brother of Leo) named his eldest son Lionel after his late brother and the family has continued to honour this memory with the great-nephew and great-great nephew carrying this name as well.

In 2010, the eldest son of Charles Clarke (nephew and namesake Leo Charles Clarke), with the support of the family, donated the Victoria Cross and the Colt sidearm to the Canadian War Museum. This was donated in memory of both his Uncle Leo and his father Charles Clarke. By 2014, the museum had acquired all three Valour Road Victoria Cross medals and they are now on permanent display at the Canadian War Museum in Ottawa.

Valour FC, a Canadian Premier League club, referenced Leo Clarke and two other Victoria Cross recipients from Winnipeg as inspiration to their club name.
