= Valour Road =

Street in Winnipeg, Manitoba, Canada

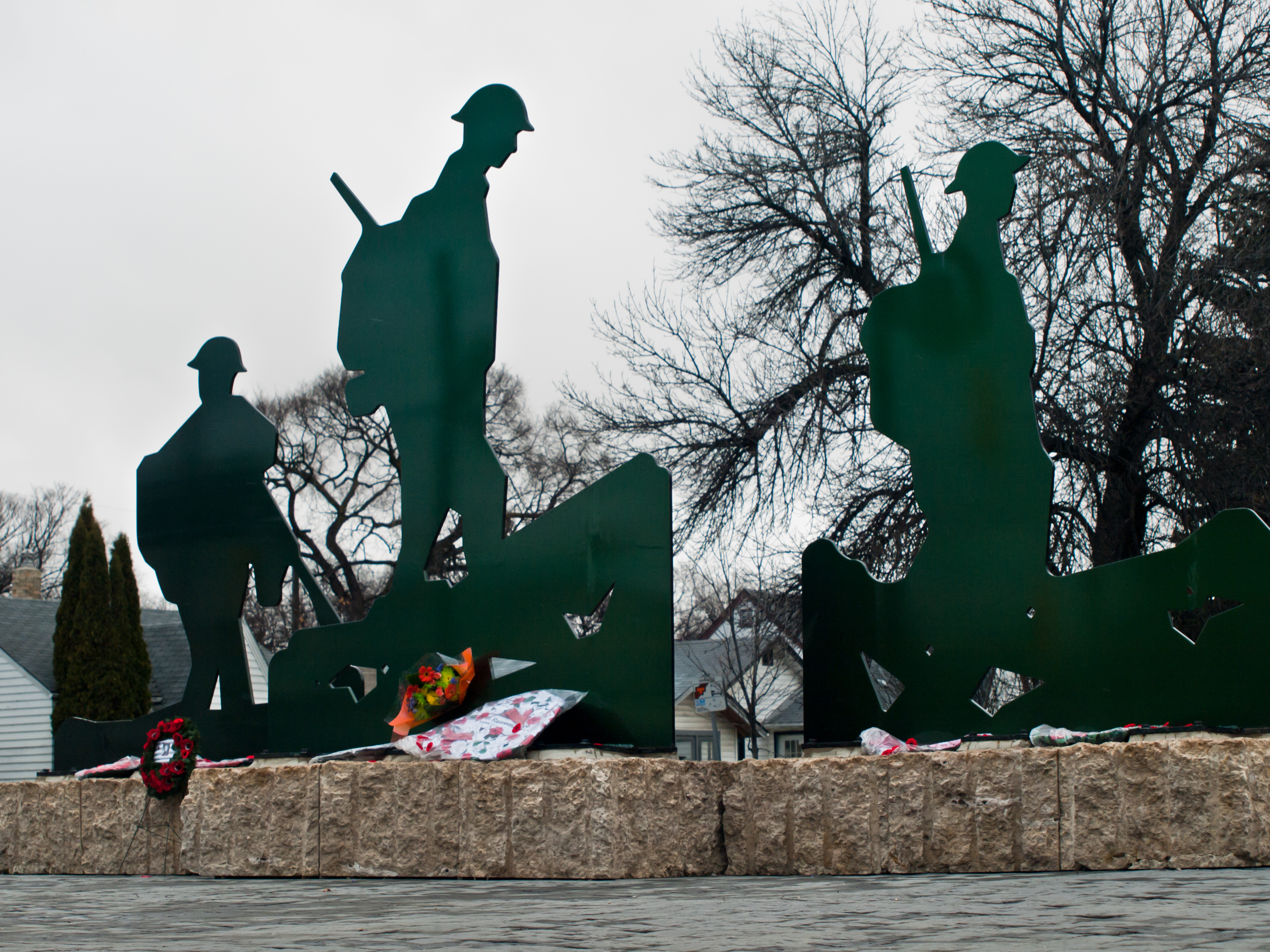
- The Valour Road mural at Sargent Avenue and Valour Road.
- Interactive map of Valour Road
- Former name: Pine Street
- Length: 2.9 km (1.8 mi)
- Location: Winnipeg, Manitoba
- Coordinates: 49°53′30″N 97°11′18″W

Other
- Known for: Three First World War soldiers who lived on this street were recipients of the Victoria Cross

Valour Road is a 3-kilometre (1.9 mi) street in the West End area of Winnipeg, Manitoba, Canada. Originally called Pine Street, it was renamed Valour Road in 1925 to recognize three young men—Corporal Leo Clarke, Sergeant-Major Frederick William Hall, and Lieutenant Robert Shankland—who all lived in the 700-block and individually received the Victoria Cross for acts of bravery during the First World War.

Shankland was the only one to survive the war; the other two men were awarded the medal posthumously. Shankland attended the ceremony for the renaming of Pine Street to Valour Road. All three medals are now on permanent display at the Canadian War Museum in Ontario. The three medals were loaned to the Manitoba Museum in 2014 to commemorate the 100th anniversary of the start of the Great War. This marked the first time that all three medals were in Winnipeg at the same time. A memorial statue of the three men is located at the corner of Valour Road and Sargent Avenue. The inscription on the Victoria Cross is "For Valour".

The Valour Road Commemorative Plaza is a Victoria Cross-shaped plaza, located at the corner of Valour Road and Sargent Avenue, commemorating Clarke, Hall, and Shankland. Designed in 2005 by David Wagner Associates, it features four bronze plaques mounted on Tyndall-stone bases accompanied by three metal silhouettes, one for each of the three soldiers. (The fourth plaque commemorates the significance of the Victoria Cross.)

A one-minute Heritage Minute short film titled "Valour Road" recounted the heroic actions of these three men. Valour Road is also seen in the 2011 film Goon.
