= Frederick William Hall =

Canadian soldier of World War I

Frederick William Hall VC
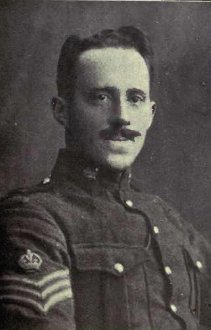
- Born: 21 February 1885; Kilkenny, Ireland
- Died: 24 April 1915 (aged 30); Poelcappelle, Belgium
- Military career
- Branch: British Army; Canadian Expeditionary Force
- Service years: 1914–1915
- Rank: Company Sergeant-Major
- Units: 8th Battalion (90th Winnipeg Rifles), CEF
- Conflicts: First World War: Second Battle of Ypres †
- Awards: Victoria Cross

Frederick William Hall, VC (21 February 1885 – 24 April 1915) was a Canadian recipient of the Victoria Cross, the highest and most prestigious award for gallantry in the face of the enemy that can be awarded to British and Commonwealth forces.

== Life ==
Hall was born in Kilkenny, Ireland, on 21 February 1885. His father was a British Army soldier from London. Hall emigrated to Canada approximately 1910, and lived in Winnipeg, Manitoba.

Hall was working as a clerk in Winnipeg when the First World War started. He enlisted in the 8th Canadian Infantry Battalion (90th Winnipeg Rifles) at Valcartier Camp, Quebec, on 26 September 1914. He already had military experience. In addition to serving in the 106th Winnipeg Light Infantry of the Canadian Militia, he had spent over 12 years in the British Army's Cameronians (Scottish Rifles). He saw service in India and was awarded the Army Long Service and Good Conduct Medal. A teetotaller, Hall was a member of the British Army's Temperance Association while with the Cameronians.

He was 30 years old, and a company sergeant-major in the 8th Battalion (90th Winnipeg Rifles), Canadian Expeditionary Force, during the First World War when he performed a deed for which he was awarded the Victoria Cross.

== Victoria Cross ==
The citation in The London Gazette reads:

"No. 1539 Colour-Serjeant Frederick William Hall, 8th Canadian Battalion. On 24th April, 1915, in the neighbourhood of Ypres, when a wounded man who was lying some 15 yards from the trench called for help, Company Serjeant-Major Hall endeavoured to reach him in the face of a very heavy enfilade fire which was being poured in by the enemy. The first attempt failed, and a Non-commissioned Officer and private soldier who were attempting to give assistance were both wounded. Company Serjeant-Major Hall then made a second most gallant attempt, and was in the act of lifting up the wounded man to bring him in when he fell mortally wounded in the head."

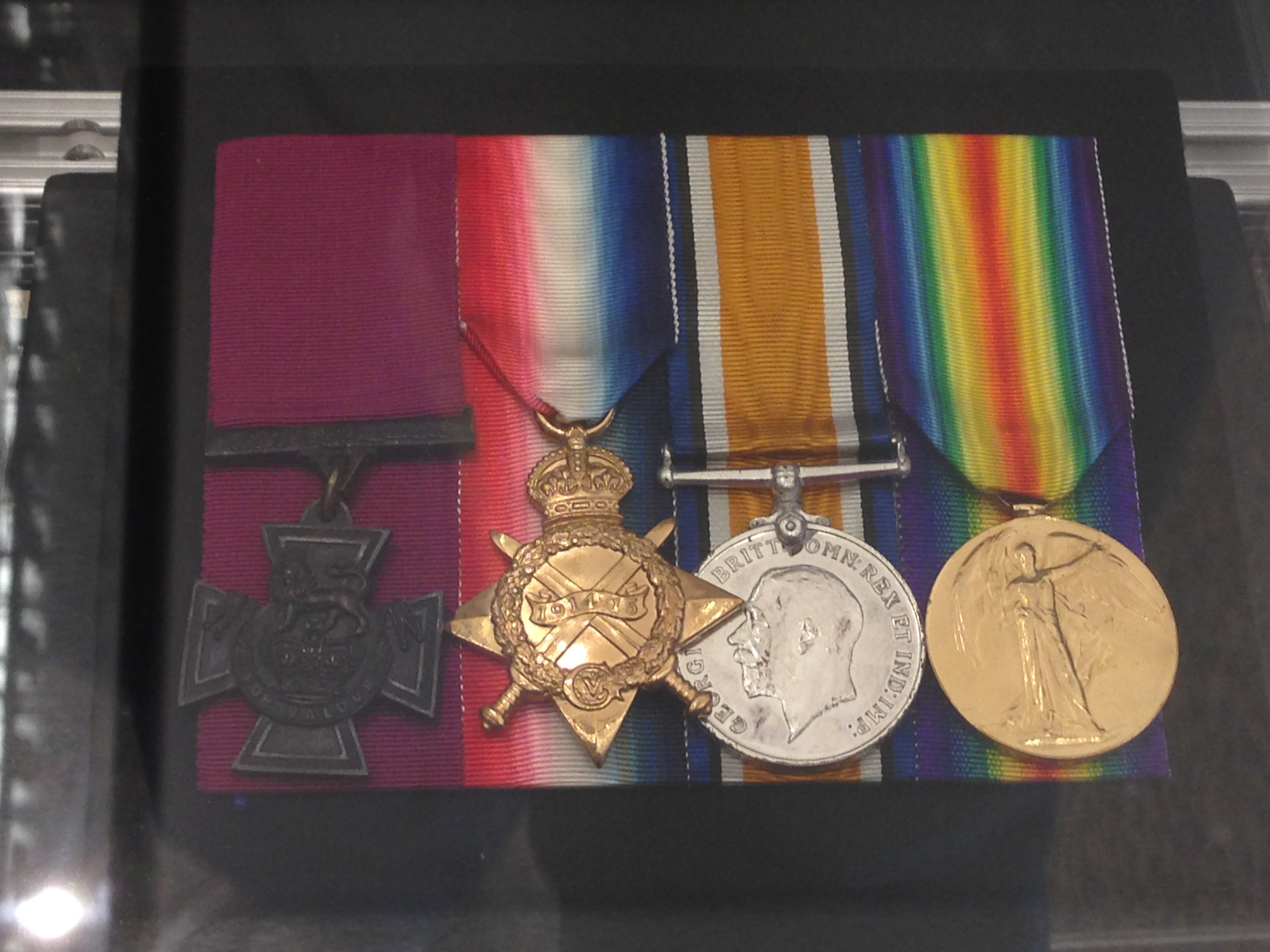
Medals of Frederick William Hall while on loan at the Manitoba Museum, Winnipeg, in October 2014

During the Second Battle of Ypres in Belgium, Hall discovered a number of men were missing. On the ridge above he could hear moans from the wounded men. Under cover of darkness, he went to the top of the ridge on two separate occasions and returned each time with a wounded man.

By nine o'clock on the morning of the 24th there were still men missing. In full daylight and under sustained and intense enemy fire, Hall, Corporal Payne and Private Rogerson crawled out toward the wounded. Payne and Rogerson were both wounded, but returned to the shelter of the front line. When a wounded man who was lying some 15 yards from the trench called for help, Hall endeavoured to reach him in the face of heavy fire by the enemy but was shot in the head. The soldier he had attempted to help, Private Arthur Edwin Clarkson, was also killed.

== Memorials ==
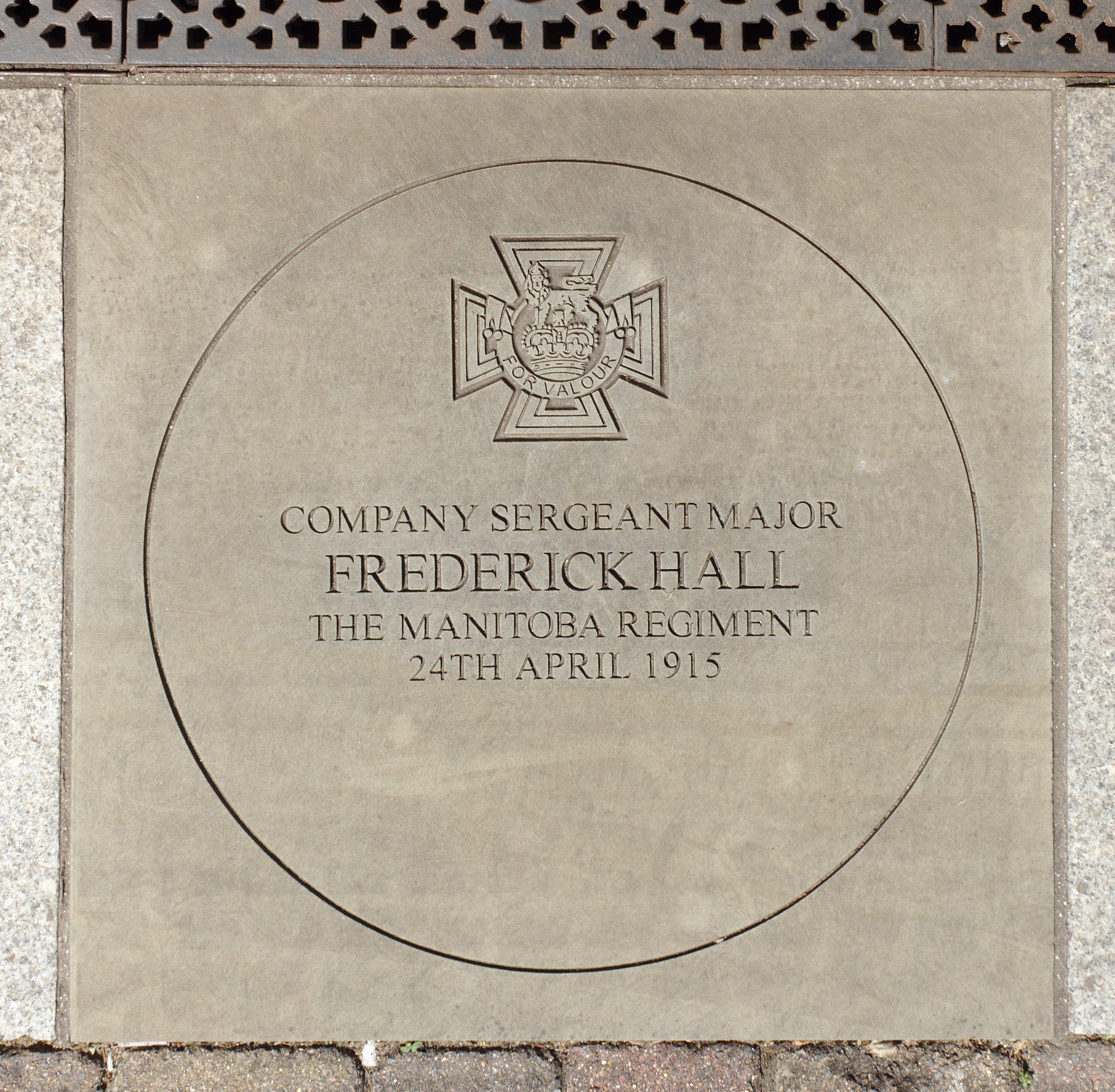
Hall's VC flagstone by the St Helens cenotaph

Frederick William Hall has no known grave. His name is on the Menin Gate Memorial to the Missing in Ypres, Belgium, honouring 56,000 troops from Britain, Australia, Canada and India whose final resting place in the Ypres Salient is unknown. The Commonwealth War Graves Commission records that he was the son of Mary Hall, of Leytonstone, London, and the late Bombardier F. Hall.

Hall lived on Pine Street in Winnipeg. In 1925, Pine Street was renamed Valour Road because three Victoria Cross recipients resided on the same 700 block of that street: Hall, Leo Clarke and Robert Shankland. It is believed to be the only street in the Commonwealth of Nations to have three Victoria Cross recipients live on it. A bronze plaque is mounted on a street lamp at the corner of Portage Avenue and Valour Road to tell the tale of the three men.

He is also remembered in St Helens, Lancashire, where he lived at the time of the 1891 United Kingdom census and used as his home address until he left for Canada in 1910.

His medals are in the Canadian War Museum. The museum has acquired all three Valour Road Victoria Cross medals and they are on permanent display in Ottawa.
