= Robert Shankland =

Canadian soldier (1887–1968)

Robert Shankland VC DCM
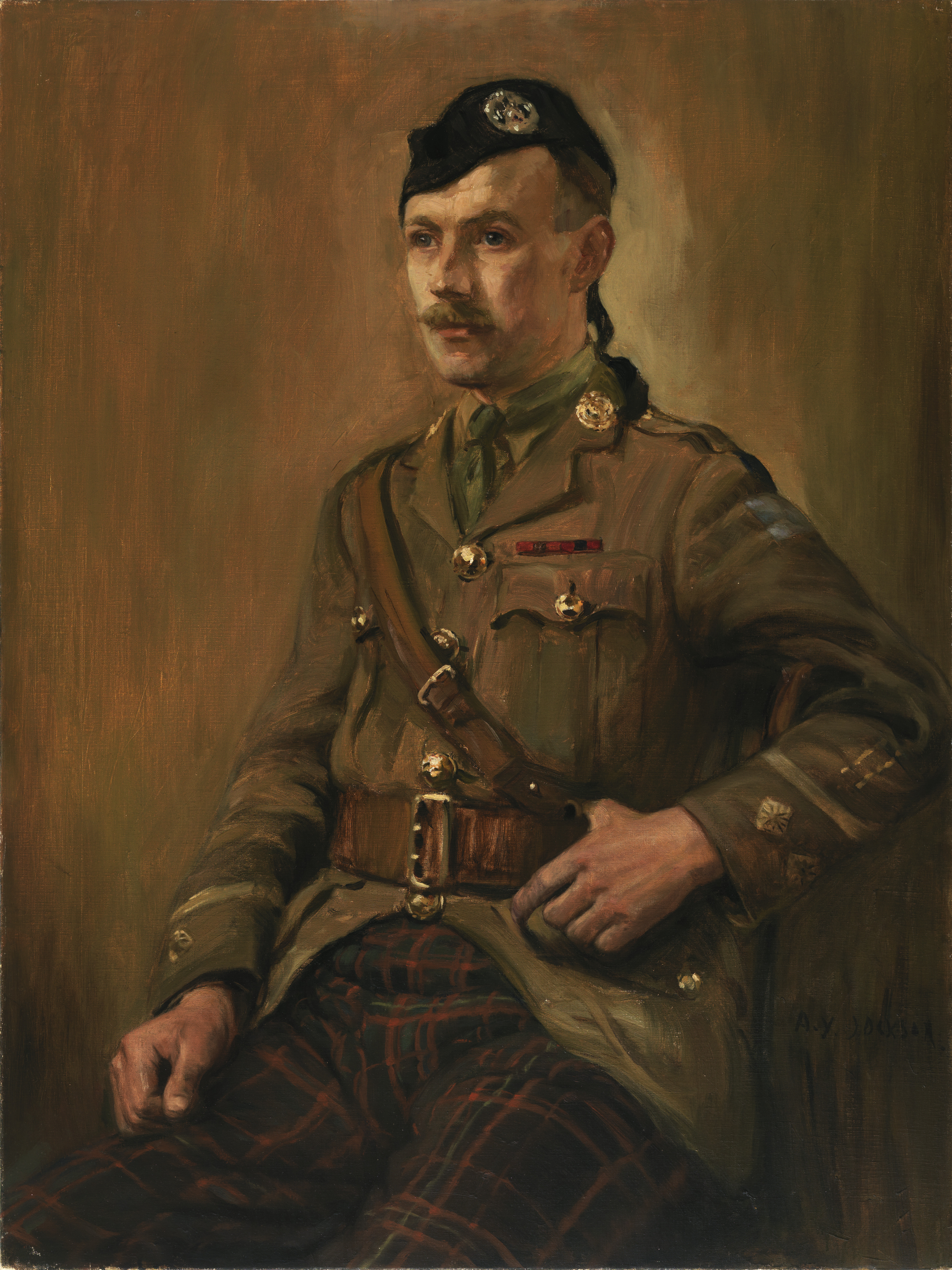
- Official portrait of Robert Shankland by A. Y. Jackson
- Born: 10 October 1887; Ayr, Scotland
- Died: 20 January 1968 (aged 80); Vancouver, British Columbia, Canada
- Military career
- Allegiance: Canada
- Service years: 1914–1919, 1940–1946
- Rank: Lieutenant-Colonel
- Units: 43rd Battalion, CEF; The Queen's Own Cameron Highlanders of Canada; The Canadian Scottish Regiment (Princess Mary's)
- Commands: Canadian Army Detention Barracks, England
- Conflicts: World War I; World War II
- Awards: Victoria Cross; Distinguished Conduct Medal

Robert Shankland VC DCM (10 October 1887 – 20 January 1968) was a Canadian recipient of the Victoria Cross, the highest and most prestigious award for gallantry in the face of the enemy that can be awarded to British and Commonwealth forces.

== Early life ==
Born in Ayr, Scotland, on 10 October 1887, Robert Shankland was the son of a railroad guard, and his first job was that of a clerk in the stationmaster's office. He moved to Canada in 1910 where he worked as assistant cashier for the Crescent Creamery Company in Winnipeg. When World War I broke out he joined the 43rd Battalion (Cameron Highlanders of Canada) CEF as a private.

== Victoria Cross ==
Awarded the Distinguished Conduct Medal for his actions at Sanctuary Wood in 1916 as a Sergeant (in charge of a stretcher bearer party), Shankland received a battlefield commission later that year and continued to serve with the 43rd Bn as an officer. On the morning of 26 October, he led his platoon of 40 men from D Company (D Company commanded by Capt. Galt) to the crest of the hill at the Bellevue Spur, the main trench line defending the approach to Passchendaele. Overrunning it and holding the position was critical to capturing the town. Early in the advance, B Company captured and held the Spur.

On the right, the 58th Bn, which was under heavy fire from Snipe Hill, was forced to retire after failing to reach its objective. Some of the men joined Shankland's platoon, but this still left his right flank open. For four hours they withstood incessant artillery shelling and German counterattacks, sustaining frightful casualties. By this time the 8th Brigade on the left was forced to withdraw leaving both of Shankland's flanks exposed.

He and his men were in danger of being cut off and losing the vital position gained at such fearful cost. The only solution was to bring up reinforcements and counterattack. Shankland turned over his command to another officer and then weaved his way through heavy mud and German shelling to battalion headquarters where he gave a first-hand report of the situation. He also offered a detailed plan on how a counterattack with reinforcements could best be achieved. He then returned to his men to lead the forthcoming attack supported by reinforcements from the 52nd and 58th battalions. For his actions that day Robert Shankland was awarded the Victoria Cross.

His citation reads:

Having gained a position at Passchendaele on 26th October 1917, Lieutenant Shankland organised the remnants of his own platoon and other men from various companies to command the foreground where they inflicted heavy casualties on the retreating Germans. He later dissipated a counter-attack, allowing for the arrival of support troops. He then communicated to his HQ a detailed evaluation of the brigade frontage. On its completion he rejoined his command, carrying on until relieved. His courage and his example undoubtedly saved a critical situation.

== Later life ==
Following the war, Shankland stayed in the Canadian Militia with the Cameron Highlanders and in his civilian work served as secretary-manager for several Winnipeg firms. He eventually moved to Victoria and joined the Canadian Scottish Regiment. When the Second World War started, he returned to Winnipeg and rejoined the Camerons. Now a Major, he went overseas with the battalion as Officer Commanding Headquarters Company. Due to his age (53) he was too old for combat duty. Promoted to lieutenant colonel, Shankland was appointed camp commandant of the Canadian Army Detention Barracks in England in December 1940.

According to the May/June 2005 issue of the Legion Magazine, "in 1946, Shankland took his discharge and became secretary of a leading securities firm in Vancouver. He died 20 January 1968, at Shaughnessy, Vancouver, and his body was cremated and his ashes (allegedly) scattered in the grounds of Vancouver's Mountain View Cemetery."

== Legacy ==
Frederick William Hall, Leo Clarke, and Robert Shankland all lived on Pine Street in Winnipeg, Manitoba, Canada. It is believed to be the only street in the world to have three Victoria Cross recipients who lived there. The city later renamed it Valour Road in their honour. A bronze plaque is mounted on a street lamp at the corner of Portage Ave and Valour Road to tell this story.

=== The medal ===
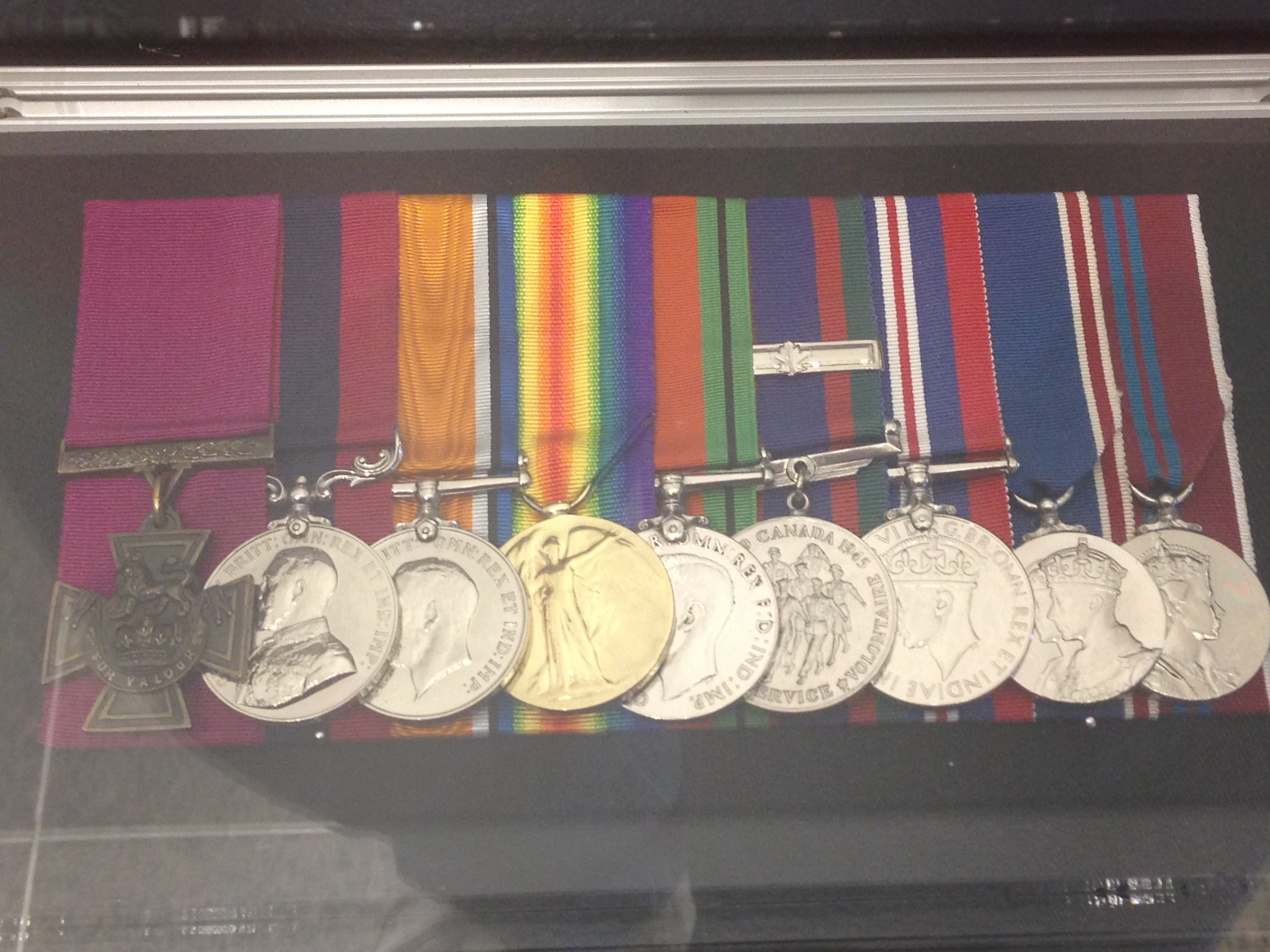
Shankland's decorations and medals on display at the Manitoba Museum in 2014

The medal was on public display at the Manitoba Museum in Winnipeg, Manitoba commencing 6 August 2014, on loan from the Canadian War Museum as part of a display celebrating the 100th anniversary of the Queen's Own Cameron Highlanders of Canada. Shankland's battledress blouse with ribbons and his miniatures are on display in The Queen's Own Cameron Highlanders of Canada Museum at Minto Armoury in Winnipeg.

The medal was placed on auction on 25 May 2009. Despite public outrage of its sale from an anonymous seller, controversy was averted when the Canadian War Museum purchased the medal at auction for $240,000 in order to keep it in Canadian public hands forever.
