= Alexander Picton Brereton =

Alexander Picton Brereton VC
- Alexander Picton Brereton after WWI.
- Born: 13 November 1892; Oak River, Westman Region, Manitoba, Canada
- Died: 10 January 1976 (aged 83); Calgary, Alberta, Canada
- Burial place: Elnora Cemetery, Elnora, Alberta
- Spouse: Mary Isabel McPhee
- Military career
- Allegiance: Dominion of Canada
- Branch: Canadian Militia: Canadian Expeditionary Force
- Service years: 1916-?
- Rank: Company Quartermaster Sergeant
- Units: 1st Canadian Division: 2nd Canadian Infantry Brigade; 8th (Winnipeg Rifles) Battalion
- Conflicts: World War I: Western Front; Battle of Amiens; World War II
- Awards: Victoria Cross
- Other work: Barber

Alexander Picton Brereton VC (13 November 1892 – 10 January 1976) was a Canadian recipient of the Victoria Cross, the highest and most prestigious award for gallantry in the face of the enemy that can be awarded to British and Commonwealth forces.

== Details ==
He was the son of a Manitoba farmer, Cloudesley Picton Brereton and Annie Frazer Black. He married Mary Isabel McPhee on 17 Jun 1925 and had three children. He was a barber. Brereton joined the Canadian Expeditionary Force in January 1916.

== Action ==
Brereton was 25 years old, and an acting corporal in the 8th (Winnipeg Rifles) Battalion, CEF during the First World War when the following deed took place for which he was awarded the VC. On 9 August 1918 east of Amiens, France, during an attack when a line of hostile machine-guns opened fire suddenly on his platoon which was in an exposed position with no cover. Corporal Brereton realised that unless something was done, his platoon would be annihilated. On his own initiative he at once sprang forward alone and, reaching one of the enemy machine-gun posts, shot the operator of the gun and bayoneted the next one who attempted to operate it, whereupon nine others surrendered. His action inspired the platoon to charge and capture the five remaining posts.

== Further information ==
He later achieved the rank of Company Quartermaster Sergeant during World War II. He is at buried at Elnora Cemetery, Elnora, Alberta, Canada. Brereton's medals are on display at the Lord Ashcroft Gallery, Imperial War Museum in London.

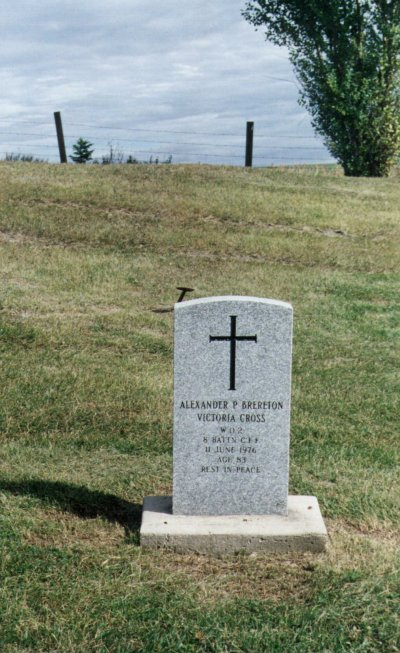
