= Black Watch (Royal Highland Regiment) of Canada =

Coordinates: 45.5079°N 73.5697°W

The Black Watch (Royal Highland Regiment) of Canada
- Badge of the regiment
- Active: 31 January 1862 – present
- Country: Province of Canada (1862–1867); Canada (1867–present)
- Branch: Canadian Army
- Type: Line infantry
- Role: Light role
- Size: Battalion
- Part of: 34 Canadian Brigade Group
- Garrison/HQ: Black Watch Armoury, 2067, rue Bleury, Montréal (Québec)
- Motto: Nemo me impune lacessit (Latin for 'No one provokes me with impunity')
- March: Quick: "Hielan' Laddie"; Slow: "The Red Hackle"
- Engagements: Fenian raids; Second Boer War; First World War; Second World War; War in Afghanistan
- Battle honours: See #Battle honours
- Website: canada.ca/en/army/corporate/2-canadian-division/the-black-watch-of-canada.html

Commanders
- Colonel-in-chief: Charles III
- Honorary Colonel: Colonel Bruce Bolton, MMM, CD
- Honorary Lieutenant-Colonel: Vacant
- Commanding Officer: Lieutenant-Colonel D.M. Serapins, CD
- Regimental Sergeant Major: Chief Warrant Officer A. Cyr

Insignia
- Hackle: Red
- Tartan: Black Watch (Government 1)

The Black Watch (Royal Highland Regiment) of Canada is a reserve infantry regiment in 34 Canadian Brigade Group, 2nd Canadian Division, of the Canadian Army. The regiment is at 2067, rue Bleury (2067, Bleury Street) in Montreal, Quebec, Canada, and is currently commanded by Lieutenant-Colonel D.M. Serapins. The regiment's armoury was designated a National Historic Site of Canada in 2008. They are the senior Canadian-Scottish Regiment.

== Lineage and history ==
The regimental colour of The Black Watch (Royal Highland Regiment) of Canada.

The camp flag of The Black Watch (Royal Highland Regiment) of Canada

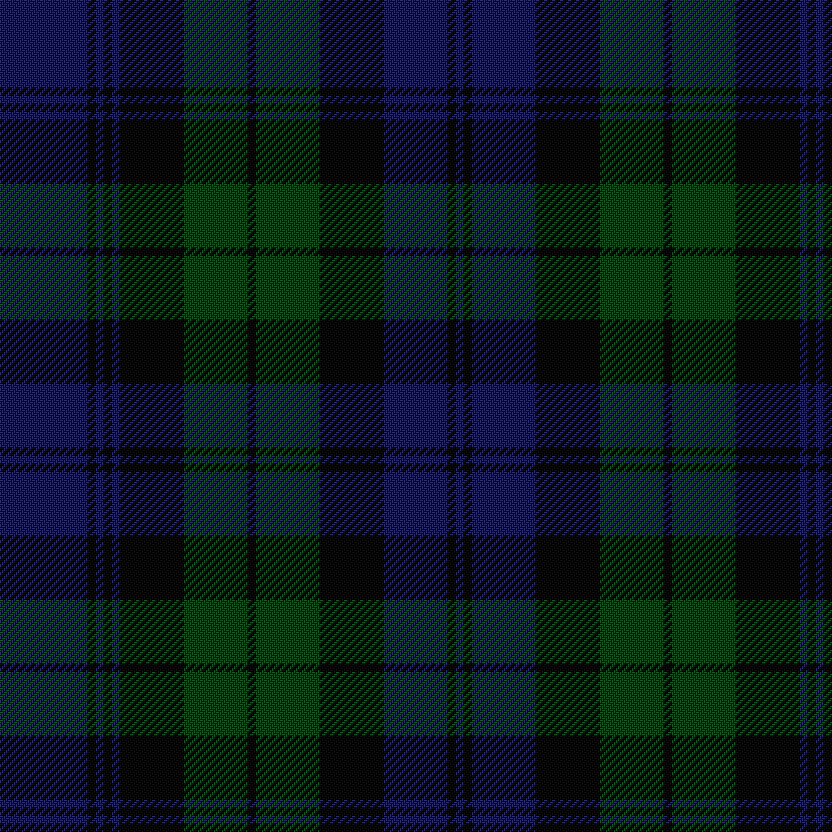
Black Watch tartan, also known as the "Government sett".

Volunteers have served since the regiment's inception in Montreal on 31 January 1862, as the 5th Battalion, Volunteer Militia Rifles of Canada. The rise of American military strength during their Civil War concerned Canada. The government authorized formation of militia regiments. Each of six Montreal Scottish chieftains responded by raising an infantry company for the 5th Battalion. Eventually, eight companies were raised. Since then, thousands of Canadian citizens have served in the Black Watch. In addition to service during the Fenian raids, they have fought in the First and Second World Wars; bolstered NATO operations in Europe and UN peacekeeping worldwide; and helped their fellow Canadians at home during the January 1998 North American ice storm (Operation Assistance) and 2011, 2017, and 2019 flooding in Quebec (Operation Lentus).

Queen Elizabeth (Queen Elizabeth The Queen Mother after 1952) was appointed colonel-in-chief in 1947 and continued in that role until her death in 2002. The Prince of Wales (King Charles III after 2022) was appointed colonel-in-chief in 2004.

=== The Black Watch (Royal Highland Regiment) of Canada ===
- Originated 31 January 1862 in Montreal, Canada East, as the 5th Battalion Volunteer Militia Rifles, Canada
- Redesignated 7 November 1862 as the 5th Battalion, "The Royal Light Infantry of Montreal"
- Redesignated 19 November 1875 as the 5th Battalion, "Royal Fusiliers"
- Redesignated 27 February 1880 as the 5th Battalion, "Royal Scots Fusiliers"
- Redesignated 29 February 1884 as the 5th Battalion, "Royal Scots of Canada"
- Redesignated 8 May 1900 as the 5th Regiment "Royal Scots of Canada"
- Redesignated 2 May 1904 as the 5th Regiment "Royal Scots of Canada, Highlanders"
- Redesignated 1 October 1906 as the 5th Regiment "Royal Highlanders of Canada"
- Redesignated 29 March 1920 as the Royal Highlanders of Canada
- Redesignated 1 January 1930 as the Black Watch (Royal Highlanders) of Canada
- Redesignated 1 July 1935 as the Black Watch (Royal Highland Regiment) of Canada
- Amalgamated 16 October 1953 with the 1st Canadian Highland Battalion and the 2nd Canadian Highland Battalion, which became the 1st and 2nd Battalions, respectively, while the Reserve component of the regiment became the 3rd Battalion.
- 1 July 1970 the 1st and 2nd Battalions were reduced to nil strength and transferred to the Supplementary Order of Battle and the Reserve Force battalion automatically relinquished its numerical designation.

=== The 1st Canadian Highland Battalion ===
- Originated 4 May 1951 in Valcartier, Quebec
- Amalgamated 16 October 1953 with The Black Watch (Royal Highland Regiment) of Canada and redesignated as the 1st Battalion, The Black Watch (Royal Highland Regiment) of Canada

=== The 2nd Canadian Highland Battalion ===
- Originated 10 April 1952 in Aldershot, Nova Scotia
- Amalgamated 16 October 1953 with The Black Watch (Royal Highland Regiment) of Canada and redesignated as the 2nd Battalion, The Black Watch (Royal Highland Regiment) of Canada

=== Lineage chart ===
Lineage chart

1812	5th Bn, Select Embodied Militia
1815	Disbanded
1862	5th Bn Volunteer Militia Rifles, Canada
1862	5th Bn, "The Royal Light Infy of Montreal"
1866	Active service (Note: March)
1870	Active service (Note: May)
1875	5th Bn, "Royal Fusiliers"
1880	5th Bn, "Royal Scots Fusiliers"
1884	5th Bn, "Royal Scots of Canada"
1900	5th Regt "Royal Scots of Canada"
1904	5th Regt "Royal Scots of Canada, Highlanders"
1906	1st Bn, 5th Regt "Royal Highlanders of Canada"	2nd Bn, 5th Regt "Royal Highlanders of Canada"
1914	13th Bn, CEF	42nd Bn, CEF
1915	73rd "Overseas" Bn, CEF
1917	Disbanded
1920	Disbanded	Disbanded
1920	1st Bn (13th Bn, CEF), The Royal Highlanders of Canada	2nd Bn (42nd Bn, CEF), The Royal Highlanders of Canada	3rd Bn (73rd Bn, CEF), (Note: Reserve) The Royal Highlanders of Canada	4th Bn, The Royal Highlanders of Canada
1930	1st Bn (13th Bn, CEF), The Black Watch (Royal Highlanders) of Canada	2nd Bn (42nd Bn, CEF), The Black Watch (Royal Highlanders) of Canada	3rd Bn (73rd Bn, CEF), The Black Watch (Royal Highlanders) of Canada	4th Bn, The Black Watch (Royal Highlanders) of Canada
1935	1st Bn (13th Bn, CEF), The Black Watch (Royal Highland Regt) of Canada	2nd Bn (42nd Bn, CEF), The Black Watch (Royal Highland Regt) of Canada	3rd Bn (73rd Bn, CEF), The Black Watch (Royal Highland Regt) of Canada	4th Bn, The Black Watch (Royal Highland Regt) of Canada
1936	Disbanded	Disbanded
1939	1st Bn, The Black Watch (Royal Highland Regt) of Canada, CASF
1940	2nd (Reserve) Bn, The Black Watch (Royal Highland Regt) of Canada	3rd (Reserve) Bn, The Black Watch (Royal Highland Regt) of Canada
1942	2nd Bn, The Black Watch (Royal Highland Regt) of Canada, CASF	3rd (Reserve) Bn, The Black Watch (Royal Highland Regt) of Canada	4th (Reserve) Bn, The Black Watch (Royal Highland Regt) of Canada
1943	Disbanded	2nd (Reserve) Bn, The Black Watch (Royal Highland Regt) of Canada
1945	Disbanded	1st Bn, The Black Watch (Royal Highland Regt) of Canada
1946	The Black Watch (Royal Highland Regt) of Canada	Disbanded
1951	"E" Coy, The Black Watch (Royal Highland Regt) of Canada	"F" Coy, The Black Watch (Royal Highland Regt) of Canada
1951	"A" Coy, 1st Canadian Highland Bn	1st Canadian Highland Bn
1952	"A" Coy, 2nd Canadian Highland Bn	2nd Canadian Highland Bn
1953	1st Bn, The Black Watch (Royal Highland Regt) of Canada	2nd Bn, The Black Watch (Royal Highland Regt) of Canada	3rd Bn, The Black Watch (Royal Highland Regt) of Canada
1970	Supplementary Order of Battle	Supplementary Order of Battle	The Black Watch (Royal Highland Regt) of Canada
2012	Perpetuates 5th Bn	Perpetuates 5th Bn	Perpetuates 5th Bn

== Perpetuations ==
=== War of 1812 ===
- 5th Battalion, Select Embodied Militia

=== World War I ===
- 13th Battalion (Royal Highlanders of Canada), CEF
- 42nd Battalion (Royal Highlanders of Canada), CEF
- 73rd Battalion (Royal Highlanders of Canada), CEF

== Operational history ==
=== Fenian raids ===
The 5th Battalion, The Royal Light Infantry of Canada, was called out on active service on 8 March 1866 and served on the South-Eastern frontier until it was removed from active service on 31 March 1866. The battalion was again called out on active service on 24 May 1870, again serving on the South-Eastern frontier until it was removed from active service on 31 May 1870.

=== Boer War ===
The regiment did not fight in the Boer War in South Africa, but contributed volunteers for the various Canadian units, mainly to the 2nd (Special Service) Battalion, Royal Canadian Regiment of Infantry.

=== World War I ===
Details of the 5th Regiment, Royal Highlanders of Canada, were placed on active service on 6 August 1914 for local protective duty.

The 13th Battalion (Royal Highlanders of Canada), CEF, was authorized on 1 September 1914 and embarked for Great Britain on 26 September 1914, disembarking in France on 16 February 1915, where it fought as part of the 3rd Infantry Brigade, 1st Canadian Division in France and Flanders until the end of the war. The 13th Battalion was disbanded on 15 September 1920.

The 42nd Battalion (Royal Highlanders of Canada), CEF, was authorized on 7 November 1914 and embarked for Great Britain on 10 June 1915, disembarking in France on 9 October 1915, where it fought as part of the 7th Infantry Brigade, 3rd Canadian Division in France and Flanders until the end of the war. The battalion was disbanded on 15 September 1920.

The 73rd Battalion (Royal Highlanders of Canada), CEF, was authorized on 10 July 1915 and embarked for Great Britain on 31 March 1916, disembarking in France on 13 August 1916, where it fought as part of the 12th Infantry Brigade, 4th Canadian Division until 9 April 1917 when it was withdrawn from the line after Vimy and was disbanded, its personnel used as replacements for other units. The battalion was officially disbanded on 19 April 1917.

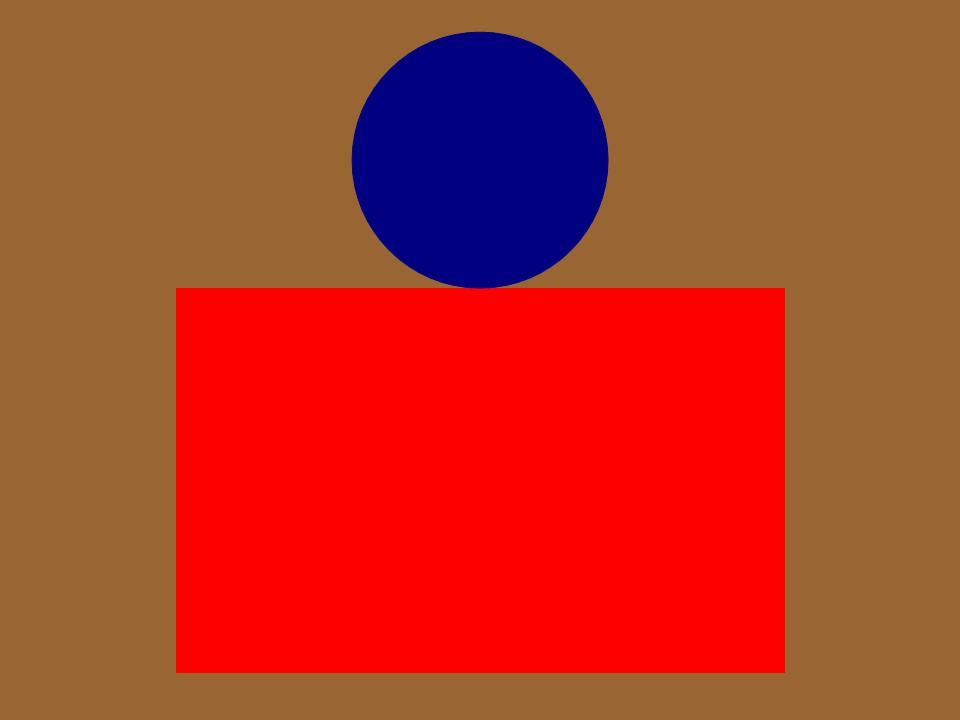
The distinguishing patch of the 13th Battalion (Royal Highlanders of Canada), CEF

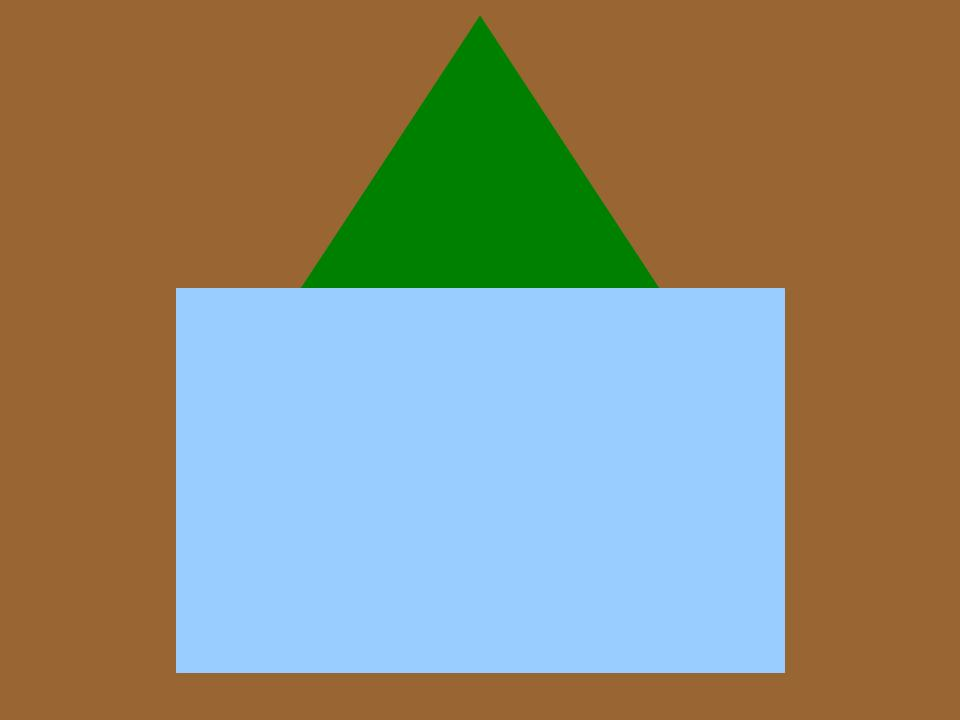
The distinguishing patch of the 42nd Battalion (Royal Highlanders of Canada), CEF

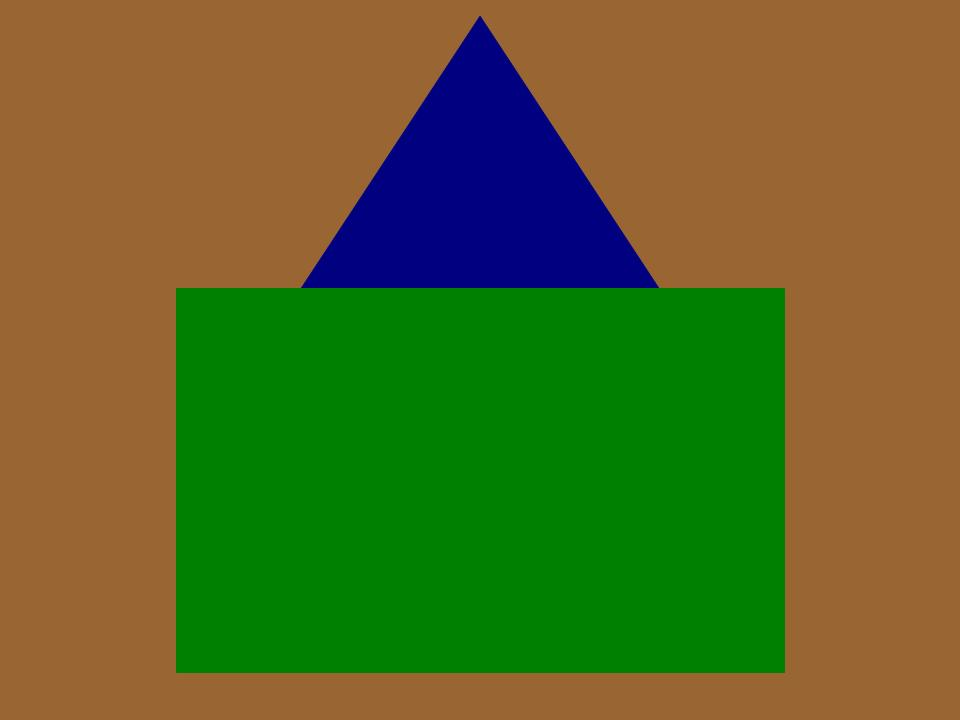
The distinguishing patch of the 73rd Battalion (Royal Highlanders of Canada), CEF

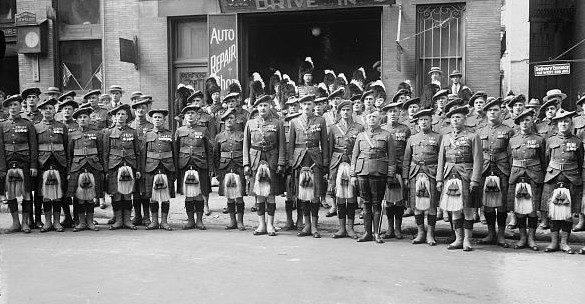
Black Watch, 1925

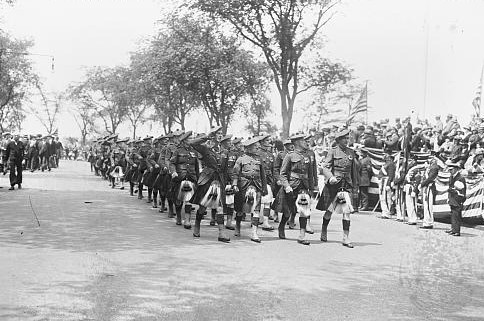
Black Watch, 1925

=== World War II ===
The 2nd Battalion was called out on service on 26 August 1939 and details of the battalion were placed on active service on 1 September 1939, as the 2nd Battalion, The Black Watch (Royal Highland Regiment) of Canada, CASF (Details), for local protection duties. These details were disbanded on 31 December 1940.

The regiment mobilized the 1st Battalion, The Black Watch (Royal Highland Regiment) of Canada, CASF, on 1 September 1939. This unit, which served in Newfoundland from 22 June to 11 August 1940, embarked for Great Britain on 25 August 1940. Three platoons took part in the raid on Dieppe on 19 August 1942. On 6 July 1944, the battalion landed in France as part of the 5th Infantry Brigade, 2nd Canadian Infantry Division, and it continued to fight in North West Europe until the end of the war. The overseas battalion was disbanded on 30 November 1945.

The regiment subsequently mobilized the 2nd Battalion, The Black Watch (Royal Highland Regiment) of Canada, CASF, on 18 March 1942. This unit served in Canada in a home defence role as part of Atlantic Command until it was disbanded on 15 August 1943.

The 1st Battalion, Black Watch was brigaded with Le Régiment de Maisonneuve and Les Fusiliers Mont-Royal of the Second Canadian Division; however, the FMR were replaced with The Calgary Highlanders in the 5th Brigade in 1940.

The 1st Battalion suffered more casualties than any other Canadian infantry battalion in Northwest Europe according to figures published in The Long Left Flank by Jeffrey Williams. Disaster seemed to follow the unit;

- On the voyage to France on the day of the Dieppe Raid, casualties were suffered by the unit during a grenade priming accident on board their ship, HMS Duke of Wellington.
- During the Battle of Verrières Ridge on 25 July 1944, 325 men left the start line and only 15 made it back to friendly lines, the others being killed or wounded by well-entrenched Waffen SS soldiers and tanks.
- On 13 October 1944 – known as Black Friday by the Black Watch – the regiment put in an assault near Hoogerheide during the Battle of the Scheldt in which all four company commanders were killed, and one company of 90 men was reduced to just four survivors.
- During the Battle of Walcheren Causeway, the Black Watch suffered 85 casualties, the bulk of them suffered on the causeway.
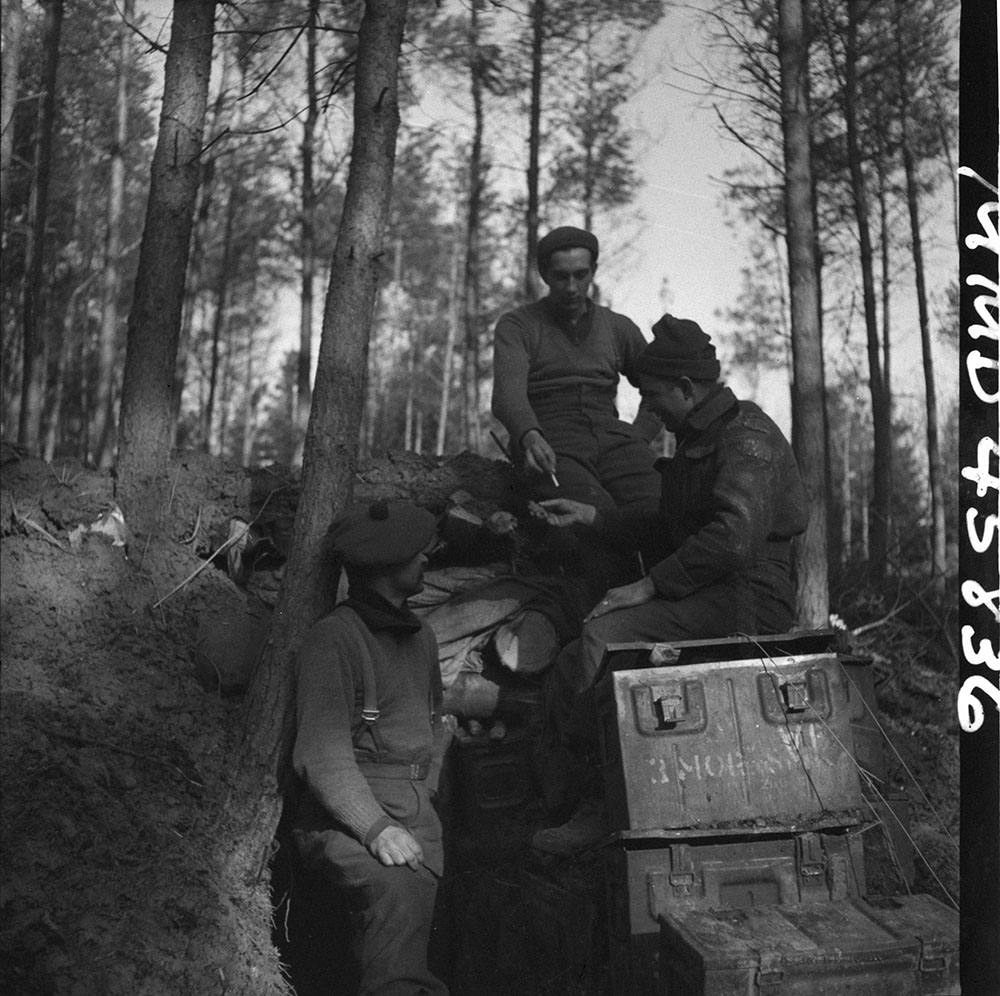
Members of the Black Watch near Groesbeek, the Netherlands

=== Post-Second World War ===
On 4 May 1951, the regiment mobilized two temporary Active Force companies designated, "E" and "F" Companies. "E" Company was reduced to nil strength upon its personnel being incorporated into the 1st Canadian Highland Battalion for service in Germany with the North Atlantic Treaty Organization. It was disbanded on 29 July 1953. "F" Company was initially used as a replacement pool for "E" Company. On 15 May 1952, it was reduced to nil strength, upon its personnel being absorbed by the 2nd Canadian Highland Battalion for service in Korea with the United Nations. "F" Company was disbanded on 29 July 1953.

The 1st Canadian Highland Battalion originated in Valcartier, Quebec on 4 May 1951. On 16 October 1953, it was redesignated the 1st Battalion, The Black Watch (Royal Highland Regiment) of Canada.

The 2nd Canadian Highland Battalion originated in Aldershot, Nova Scotia on 10 April 1952. On 16 October 1953, it was redesignated the 2nd Battalion, The Black Watch (Royal Highland Regiment) of Canada.

The 2nd Battalion, commanded by Lt.-Col. R.M. Ross, served in Korea as part of 25th Canadian Infantry Brigade following the armistice from 29 October 1953 to 3 November 1954.

On 1 July 1970, when the 1st and 2nd Battalions were reduced to nil strength and transferred to the Supplementary Order of Battle, the Reserve Force battalion automatically relinquished its numerical designation.

== Alliances ==
- United Kingdom - Royal Regiment of Scotland, 3rd battalion the Black Watch

== Battle honours ==
In the list below, battle honours in capitals were awarded for participation in large operations and campaigns, while those in lowercase indicate honours granted for more specific battles. Battle honours in bold type are authorized to be emblazoned on the regimental colours.

The regimental colour

=== War of 1812 ===
- CHÂTEAUGUAY
- DEFENCE OF CANADA – 1812–1815 – DÉFENSE DU CANADA

=== South African War ===
- SOUTH AFRICA, 1899–1900

=== Great War ===
- YPRES, 1915, '17
- Gravenstafel
- St. Julien
- FESTUBERT, 1915
- MOUNT SORREL
- SOMME, 1916
- Pozières
- Flers-Courcelette
- Thiepval
- Ancre Heights
- Ancre, 1916
- ARRAS, 1917, '18
- Vimy, 1917
- Arleux
- Scarpe, 1917, '18
- HILL 70
- Passchendaele
- AMIENS
- Drocourt-Quéant
- HINDENBURG LINE
- Canal du Nord
- PURSUIT TO MONS
- FRANCE AND FLANDERS, 1915–18

=== Second World War ===
- BOURGUÉBUS RIDGE
- Faubourg de Vaucelles
- Verrières Ridge–Tilly-la-Campagne
- FALAISE
- Clair Tizon
- Forêt de la Londe
- Dunkirk, 1944
- Antwerp–Turnhout Canal
- THE SCHELDT
- Woensdrecht
- South Beveland
- Walcheren Causeway
- THE RHINELAND
- The Hochwald
- Xanten
- THE RHINE
- Groningen
- Oldenburg
- NORTH-WEST EUROPE, 1944–1945

=== War in Afghanistan ===
- AFGHANISTAN

== Victoria Cross recipients ==
Lance Corporal Frederick Fisher †

13th Battalion, Canadian Expeditionary Force

St. Julien, Belgium

23 April 1915

Corporal Herman James Good

13th Battalion, Canadian Expeditionary Force

near Amiens, France

8 August 1918

Private John Bernard Croak †

13th Battalion, Canadian Expeditionary Force

Amiens, France

8 August 1918

Private Thomas Dinesen

42nd Battalion, Canadian Expeditionary Force

Parvillers (near Amiens), France

12 August 1918

† - Awarded posthumously

== Pipes and drums ==
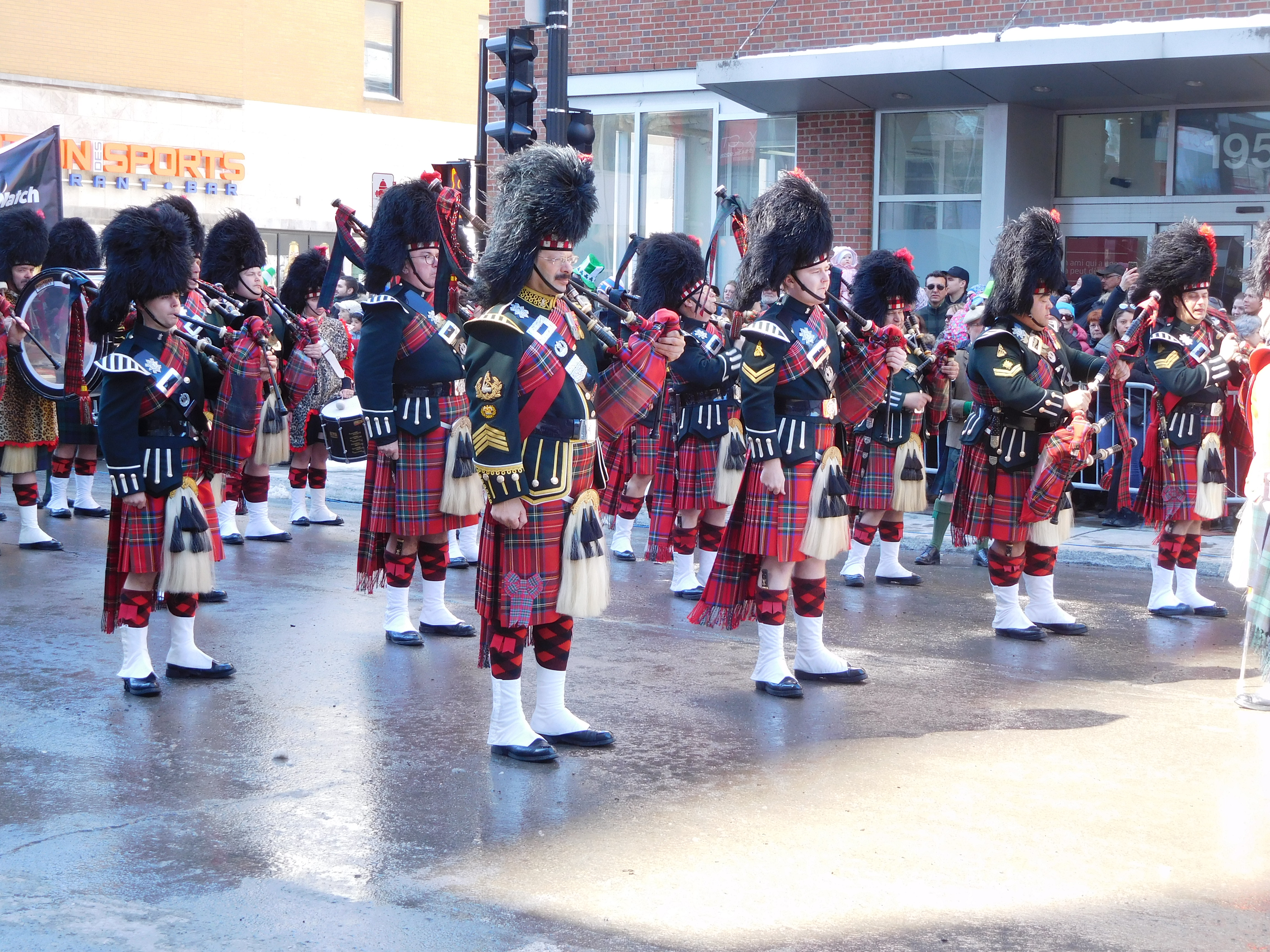
Black Watch of Canada Pipes and Drums at the Montreal St. Patrick's Day Parade in 2017.

The Black Watch of Canada Pipes and Drums is the oldest organized pipe band in North America and the Canadian Army. It has, over the years, been consistently ranked among the top Canadian Forces bands in all rated categories. It is officially part of the Black Watch. It is in Montreal. It is a descendant of the 42nd Battalion Royal Highlanders of Canada Pipes and Drums, which was active during the First World War.

=== Activities ===
The Pipes and Drums have appeared at many events over the years, with appearances including The Ed Sullivan Show, military tattoos and highland games throughout North America (including games in Fort Ticonderoga, Miami, and the Stone Mountain Highland Games and Tattoo near Atlanta). The Black Watch have played at the United States Bicentennial in 1976 and for Trooping the Colour in London. It was the only foreign band to march in the parade celebrating the Bicentennial of the American Constitution and was one of many bands at the Queen Elizabeth The Queen Mother's 90th and 100th birthday celebrations on Horse Guards Parade.

== Traditions ==
As members of a royal regiment, the pipers wear the Royal Stewart tartan, which is the tartan of the current monarch. The regimental drummers wear the Government tartan, which came to be known as the Black Watch tartan due to its dark hue.

== Cadet corps ==
Bishop's College School Cadet Corps #2 has been affiliated with the Royal Highland Regiment of Canada since 1936. In early May each year, the Corps sends two platoons and the colour party to march with the Regiment in their Church Parade.

== Music ==
Gallant Black Watch, a Scotch style march and two-step, was composed by Bert L. Billings and published in Toronto by Whaley, Royce & Co., c. 1906.

== See also ==
- Canadian-Scottish regiment
- Black Friday (1944)
- The Canadian Crown and the Canadian Forces
- List of Canadian organizations with royal patronage

== Order of precedence ==
Preceded by The Queen's Own Rifles of Canada	The Black Watch (Royal Highland Regiment) of Canada	Succeeded by Les Voltigeurs de Québec

== Notes and references ==
- Barnes, RM, The Uniforms and History of the Scottish Regiments, London, Sphere Books Limited, 1972.

== Bibliography ==
- Ducimus, The Regiments of the Canadian Infantry. St. Hubert, Quebec, Canada: Mobile Command Headquarters, Canadian Armed Forces. 1992. p. 248p. ISBN 0-9696421-0-5.
- Earl John Chapman "Black Watch of Canada: The Early Years 1862-1878" Montreal : Black Watch (Royal Highland Regiment), 2006.
- Earl John Chapman "Canada's Black Watch: Legacies of Gallantry and Service Canada's Black Watch, 1862-2012" Montreal : Black Watch (Royal Highland Regiment), 2012. ISBN 978-0-9782507-3-7
- Earl John Chapman "Not Every One A Castle: Regimental Homes of Canada's Black Watch" Montreal : Black Watch (Royal Highland Regiment), 2006.
- Brian Cuthbertson "The Black Watch story : Atlantic Canada's Regiment 1951-1970" (Halifax : Brian Cuthbertson, 2007)
- Simon Falconer "Canada's Black Watch: An Illustrated History of the Regular Force Battalions 1951-1970" (Fredericton, N.B. : Goose Lane Editions, ©2008)
- R.C. Fetherstonhaugh "The 13th Battalion Royal Highlanders of Canada, 1914-18"
- Col Paul Phelps Hutchison "The 73rd Battalion: Royal Highlanders of Canada, 1915-1917" (Bloomfield, Ont. : Museum Restoration Service, 1987)
- Col Paul Phelps Hutchison "The 73rd Battalion: Royal Highlanders of Canada, 1915-1917" (Montreal : Royal Highlanders of Canada, 2011)
- Col Paul Phelps Hutchison "Canada's black watch : the first 100 years, 1862-1962" (Montreal : Black Watch of Canada, 1987)
- James Wilson Knox "The Black Watch (Royal Highland Regiment) of Canada; the regimental book" (Montreal Regimental Headquarters, the Regimental Armoury: 1965)
- H. Rees "The Royal Highlanders of Canada allied with the Black Watch (Royal Highlanders), Montreal, Quebec, Canada, 1862-1918." (London, H. Rees, 1918.)
- W W Murray "Black Watch at Ticonderoga: Canadians in Dunsterforce: Military articles by director of military intelligence 1940-1946
- Brian Pascas "Mud, Blood, and Rum: A Year in the Trenches with the 42nd Bn" (General Store)
- Victoria Schofield "The Highland Furies: The Black Watch (1739-1899)"
- Lieut.-Colonel C.B. Topp "The 42nd Battalion, C.E.F. Royal Highlanders of Canada in the Great War"
