= Hangard Wood =

Coordinates: 49°50′18″N 2°30′34″E

Hangard Wood is a locality south of Villers-Bretonneux northern France. It was the site of Hangard village and a battle in World War I. The battle of Hangard Wood was part of the German offensive Operation Michael, in the Arras–Saint-Quentin–La Fère sector of the Somme fought in March 1918. The battle of Hangard Wood was more specifically part of the larger Second Battle of Villers-Bretonneux, fought between the Canadian, British, Australian and French armies on one side and the German army on the other.

The Second Battle of Villers-Bretonneux on 24 April 1918 was significant as the first tank-on-tank battle in history, and the Red Baron was shot down on 21 April.

Today the wood lies adjacent to a British cemetery, maintained by the Commonwealth War Graves Commission, and known as Hangard Wood British Cemetery. John Croak VC is buried there.

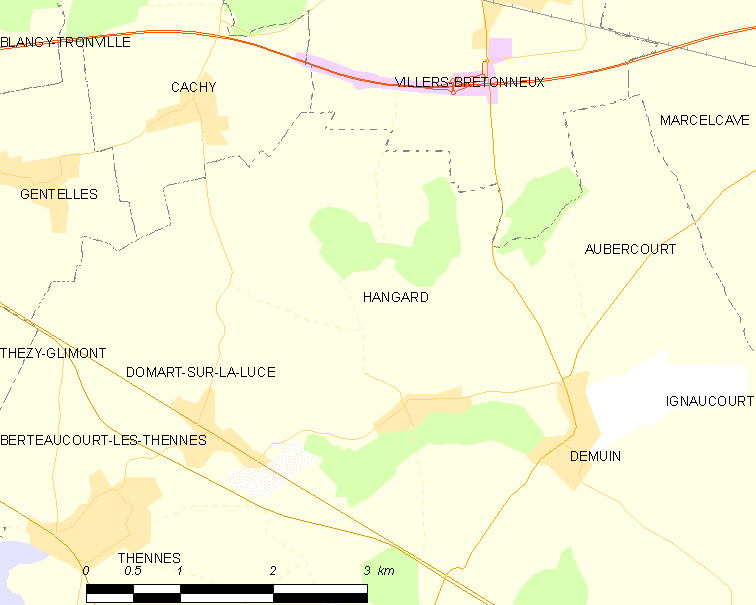
Map of Hangard

== Units involved in the battle ==
173rd Infantry Brigade (Great Britain)

- 2/2nd Battalion London regiment
- 2/4th Battalion London regiment
- 4th Division (Australia)
- 12th Brigade (Australia)

5th Brigade (Australia) 18th Battalion (Australia)

- 19th Battalion (Australia)

20th Battalion (Australia)

- 33rd Battalion (Australia)
- 34th Battalion (Australia)
- 34th Battalion (Australia)
- 35th Battalion (Australia)
- 36th Battalion (Australia)
- 1st Moroccan Infantry Division (France)
- 13th Battalion (Royal Highlanders of Canada), CEF

== Victoria Cross recipients ==
- John Croak
- Percy Storkey
- Herman James Good

== Military Medal recipients ==
- John Charles Barnett
