= Black Friday (1944) =

- Part of the Western Front of 1944–45 in the European theatre of World War II
Date	13 October 1944
Location	Hoogerheide, Netherlands
Result	German Victory

Belligerents
Canada	Germany

Commanders and leaders
(Canada) Unidentified "A Company" commander †	(Nazi Germany) Unknown

Casualties and losses
56 killed; 95 wounded; 27 captured; Total: 178 casualties	Unknown

Black Friday is the nickname given by the Black Watch (Royal Highland Regiment) of Canada to the date 13 October 1944. On that day, during World War II's Battle of the Scheldt in the Netherlands, the regiment's only overseas battalion attacked German positions on a raised railway embankment near the village of Hoogerheide after advancing across 1,200 yards of open beet fields. When final casualty totals were tabulated, it was determined the battalion had lost 145 men killed or captured; 56 men were killed, including all four of the commanders of the lettered companies, 95 wounded and 27 men were taken prisoner. One company of 90 men had only four men present and fit for duty the next day.

== Background ==
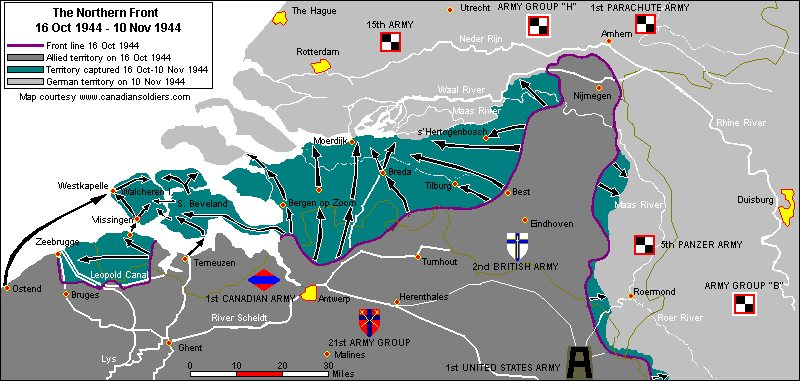
The Northern Front.

By September 1944, it had become urgent for the Allies to clear both banks of the Scheldt estuary to open the port of Antwerp to Allied shipping, thus easing logistical burdens in their supply lines stretching hundreds of miles from Normandy eastward to the Siegfried Line on the border with Germany. Since the Allied forces had landed in Normandy, France, on 6 June 1944 (D-Day), the British Second Army had pushed into the Low Countries and captured Brussels, Belgium, and Antwerp, the latter city with its port still intact but rendered useless. The advance halted with the British in possession of Antwerp, while the Germans still controlled the Scheldt estuary. Nothing was done about the blocked Antwerp ports during September because most of the strained Allied resources were allocated to Operation Market Garden, a bold plan for a single thrust into Germany which began on September 17. In the meantime, German forces in the Scheldt were able to plan a defence.

In early October, after Market Garden had failed with heavy losses, Allied forces led by the First Canadian Army set out to bring the port of Antwerp under control. The well-established German defenders staged an effective delaying action. Complicated by the waterlogged terrain, the Battle of the Scheldt proved to be an especially gruelling and costly campaign. Historians have largely ignored it until recent years. After five weeks of difficult fighting, the First Canadian Army, bolstered by attached troops from several other countries, won the Scheldt after numerous amphibious assaults, crossings of canals, and fighting over open ground. Both land and water were heavily mined, and the Germans defended their retreating front line with artillery and snipers.

The Allies finally cleared the port areas on November 8, but at a cost of 12,873 casualties (killed, wounded, or missing), half of them Canadians.

== Battle ==
An area known as "the Coffin" due to its shape on maps was held by entrenched Germans of Battle Group Chill, who controlled the mouth of the Beveland isthmus. In Operation Angus, 1st Battalion of the Black Watch was tasked with attacking northward and cutting the land links between the mainland and the isthmus. The battalion attacked at 6:15 am, marching through the lines of the 1st Battalion, Royal Regiment of Canada. "C" Company jumped off 30 minutes late at the start of the operation due to small arms fire delaying their advance, and the supporting artillery attack was therefore ill-timed. By 6:55 am, “C” Company had advanced 230 metres (250 yd) beyond the start line and was taking fire from the Germans. During their advance across the beet fields, the Canadians received heavy German small arms, mortar, and artillery fire (including airbursts), and by 7:35 am, the commanders of both "B" and "C" Companies had been wounded. At about 7:50 am, snipers were reported firing on the men of "C" Company. German artillery pieces and mortars began to lay a smokescreen to impede further Canadian attempts to advance. Slow progress ground to a halt, and by 8:20 am, the forward-most Canadian troops were pinned down. Most of the men of "B" and "C" Companies soon retreated to their start line with covering fire from "D" Company. The commanding officer of the Black Watch, Colonel Bruce Ritchie, and the brigadier, W. J. Megill, were visited by the commanders of “A” and “D” Companies at 8:50 am, and Brigadier Megill called for air support. Ritchie and Megill visited the positions of "A" Company on the front lines at 9:45 am and developed a plan for a second attack against German positions on the railway embankment with tanks and Wasp flamethrowers. By 11:10 am, German troops reoccupied the positions formerly held by "C" Company after the latter’s forwardmost platoon was forced back by heavy machine gun fire. "B" Company had 41 men remaining, and "C" Company only 25. For about five hours, “there was little change in the companies’ positions.” At 11:45 am, twelve Spitfires conducted a strafing attack on a brickworks near the railroad embankment in an attempt to disrupt the German defences.

In the second attack, scheduled for 5:00 pm, "A" Company planned to advance on the right and "D" Company on the left, with the remains of "C" Company to support "D" Company.

At 5:00 pm, the attack jumped off again, supported by machine gun, tank, and artillery fire. The armoured flamethrowers were employed against German positions with "considerable effect on the enemy," but one flamethrower was lost. It was reported that "A" Company had reached its objective by 6:20 pm, but their situation was described as "sticky", with German resistance being heavy. By 6:30, "D" Company was on its objective as well. In reality, "A" Company was "not nearly at its objective" and had suffered heavy losses. By the early morning of 14 October, firing on both sides quieted down, and at 1:00 am, the brigadier ordered the battalion to be withdrawn. When the men returned to their companies' areas, they were given hot food and allowed to rest until 4:00 pm, foregoing lunch. Stretcher bearers and other medical personnel worked all day in the beet fields to locate and evacuate wounded men. Initial reports listed eight officers and 178 other ranks as casualties; killed, wounded, or missing in action. Total casualties were not as high as those suffered by the Black Watch during the earlier Battle of Verrières Ridge in July 1944 (307, including five officers and 118 other ranks killed or died of wounds), but what set Black Friday apart was the final ratio of killed in action and captured to total casualties; 83 out of 145.

Tentative casualties suffered by the 1st Battalion, Black Watch, 13 October 1944
Company	Killed	Wounded	Missing	Total
"A" Company	1 OR	1 officer, 37 OR	31 OR	1 officer, 69 OR
"B" Company		2 officers, 28 OR	7 OR	2 officers, 35 OR
"C" Company	1 OR	7 OR	2 officers, 33 OR	2 officers, 41 OR
"D" Company	1 OR	12 OR	1 officer, 7 OR	1 officer, 20 OR
Support Company		2 officers, 2 OR	1 OR	2 officers, 3 OR
Battalion Headquarters		5 OR	5 OR	10 OR
Tentative total	3 OR	5 officers, 97 OR	3 officers, 84 OR	8 officers, 178 OR
