= Hangard Wood British Cemetery =

WWI CWGC cemetery in Somme, France

- Commonwealth War Graves Commission
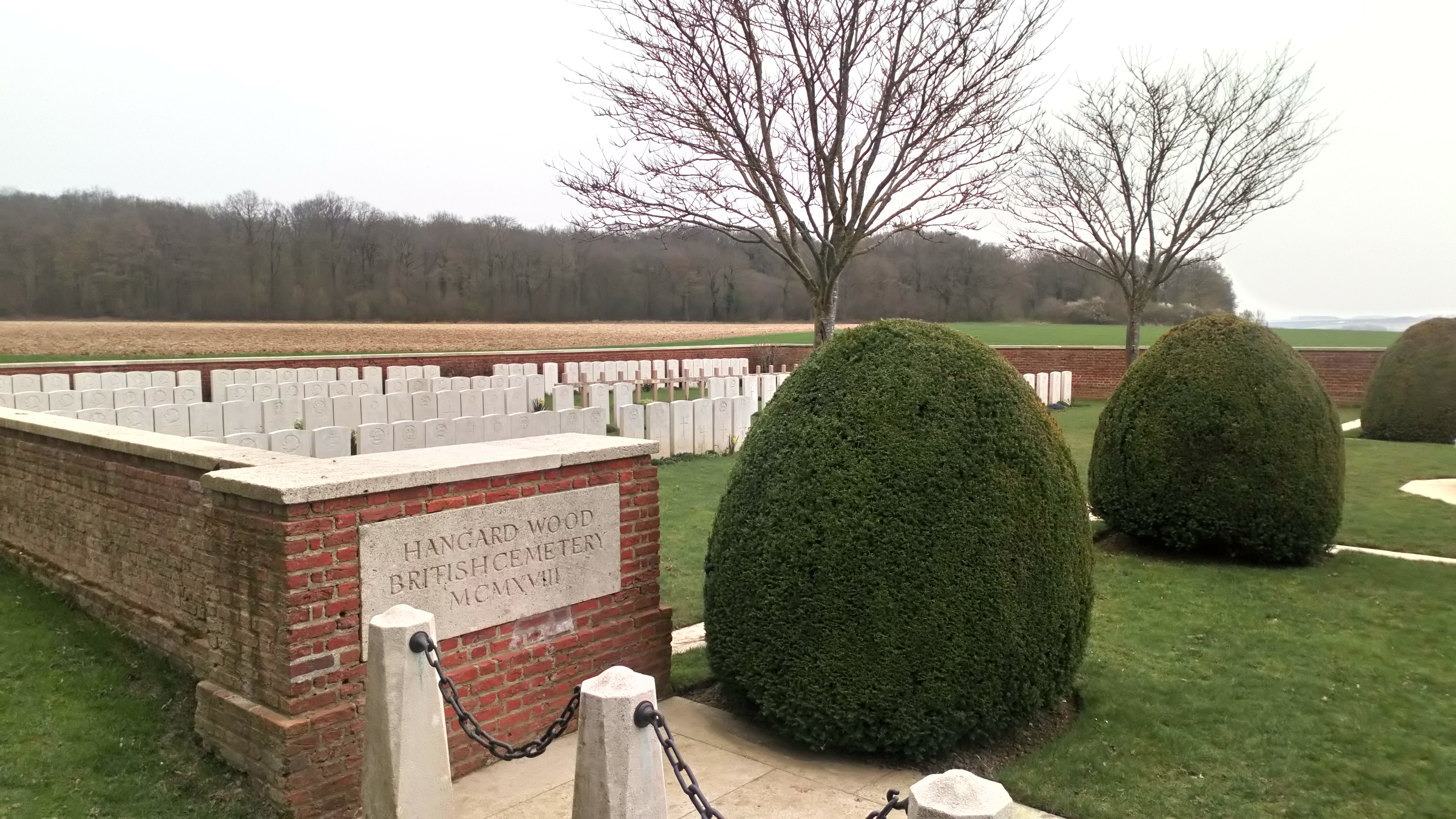
- Used for those deceased 1918
- Established: 1918
- Location: 49.83688°N 2.50763°E near Villers-Bretonneux, Somme, France
- Total burials: 155
- Unknowns: 38

Burials by nation
- Allied Powers: Canada: 59; United Kingdom: 40; Australia: 4; South Africa: 1; Unknown 38; France: 14

Burials by war
- First World War: 141

Hangard Wood British Cemetery is a Commonwealth War Graves Commission burial ground for the dead of the First World War. It is located near Villers-Bretonneux, in the Somme department of France.

== History ==
Hangard Wood, to the south of Villers-Bretonneux, was the location of a number of battles during the First World War, from April to August 1918. Hangard itself had been defended by the 18th Division during the German spring offensive while the area of the cemetery itself was held by the Germans. In August, during the early stages of the Hundred Days Offensive, it was captured by the Canadian Corps.

== Cemetery ==
The cemetery was established by the burial officer of the Canadian Corps in August 1918. It initially held the bodies of soldiers who had died in the fighting in Hangard that month, but also received the remains of others killed in the area earlier in the year, during the Spring Offensive. In the post-war period, further remains of those killed elsewhere on the Somme, were interred in the cemetery.

The cemetery contains the remains of 141 soldiers of the British Commonwealth. Of the 103 identified casualties are 59 Canadians, 40 British, four Australian, and a sole South African. There are also 14 French graves in the cemetery. A notable interment is John Croak, a Canadian soldier who was posthumously awarded the Victoria Cross for his actions during the Battle of Amiens.

Located in Hangard Wood, on the road between Villers-Bretonneux station and Hangard, the cemetery is laid out substantially as a square. The entrance is on the northwest corner, and directly opposite is a Cross of Sacrifice.
