= Zeta Psi =

International collegiate fraternity

- ΖΨ
- Founded: June 1, 1847; 179 years ago New York University
- Type: Social
- Affiliation: NIC
- Status: Active
- Scope: International
- Motto: ΤΚΦ
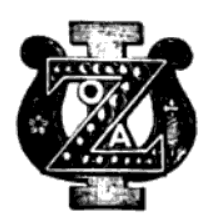
- Member badge
- Colors: Primary: Pure White; Secondary: Zeta Psi Gold; Pure Black; Tertiary: Escutcheon Green
- Flag
- Flower: White carnation
- Publication: The Circle
- Philanthropy: Zete Kids USA
- Chapters: 100
- Nickname: Zete
- Headquarters: 15 South Henry St; Pearl River, New York 10965; United States
- Website: zetapsi.org

Zeta Psi (ΖΨ) is an international collegiate fraternity. It was founded in 1847 at New York University. The fraternity has over 100 chapters, with roughly 50,000 members. Zeta Psi was a founding member of the North American Interfraternity Conference.

As one of the world's oldest collegiate fraternities, Zeta Psi has historically been selective about the campuses at which it establishes chapters.

== History ==
=== 1847–1860: formation ===
On June 1, 1847, three students at New York University established Zeta Psi fraternity in a New York City bungalow. Its founders were John Bradt Yates Sommers, William Henry Dayton and John Moon Skillman. These men formed the core of the first chapter, Phi, but Dayton left New York due to poor health shortly after and died within the year.

The fraternity established a second chapter, Zeta, at Williams College. The Delta chapter was founded at Rutgers University later that year. Three chapters followed in 1850: Omicron (now Omicron Epsilon) at Princeton University, Sigma at the University of Pennsylvania, and Chi at Colby College in Waterville, Maine. The first Alpha chapter was founded in 1852 at Dickinson College in, but members met resistance from the administration, and the chapter became inactive in 1872.

=== 1860–1864: American Civil War ===
During the Civil War, the operation of Zeta Psi halted as campuses rallied for war and sent companies of soldiers to battle. At the outbreak of war, the Upsilon chapter at the University of North Carolina was the only chapter of in the Southern states. The Grand Chapter of Zeta Psi held a special meeting in early July 1862 where it adopted a resolution of unity: "while we many differ in political sentiment with those of our Brothers who are courageously battling for principles which they deem right, no disaster shall separate them from the union of Tau Kappa Phi."

The brothers of Upsilon replied by letter:

WHEREAS, The present distracted state of our country renders it inexpedient to hold our convention in this State during this year
RESOLVED, That the Sigma Alpha be instructed to write to all Chapters, assuring them that though our Federal Union has been dissolved, still the Circle of Zeta Psi Fraternity shall never be broken;
RESOLVED, That the bonds of Tau Kappa Phi which bind us to our Brothers in the North are as strong as they ever were.

The tale of Brother Henry Schwerin (Θ '63) illustrates the embodiment of love even in the most trying of circumstance. Schwerin lay gravely wounded after the bloody Battle of Chattanooga; pinned on the breast of his Union uniform was the badge of Zeta Psi. A passing Confederate soldier, also a Zete, spied the badge and carried the Schwerin to medical care and safety. The badge later passed to his brother, Max Schwerin (Θ '70), who would one day serve as international president. After his death, it was donated to the fraternity's archives and remains among its treasures. Brother John Day Smith (Ε '72) witnessed the incident on the Chattanooga field and later related it to Brother Francis Lawton (Ε '69), who wrote the poem "The Badge of Zeta Psi," later set to original music.

Many chapters were inactive after the war, including Eta (Gettysburg, Pennsylvania), Gamma (Georgia Military Institute), Psi Epsilon (Dartmouth), Upsilon (UNC), Epsilon (Brown), and Theta (Union). The Theta and Eta chapters ultimately recovered and reactivated.

=== 1864–1914: breaking new ground ===
Zeta Psi was the first fraternity to establish a chapter west of the Mississippi River. In 1870, Zeta Psi established the Iota chapter at the University of California, Berkeley (though the Iota chapter would not be joined until 1892 by the next Western addition, the Mu chapter at Stanford University). On March 27, 1879, the fraternity became international when it established a chapter at the University of Toronto.

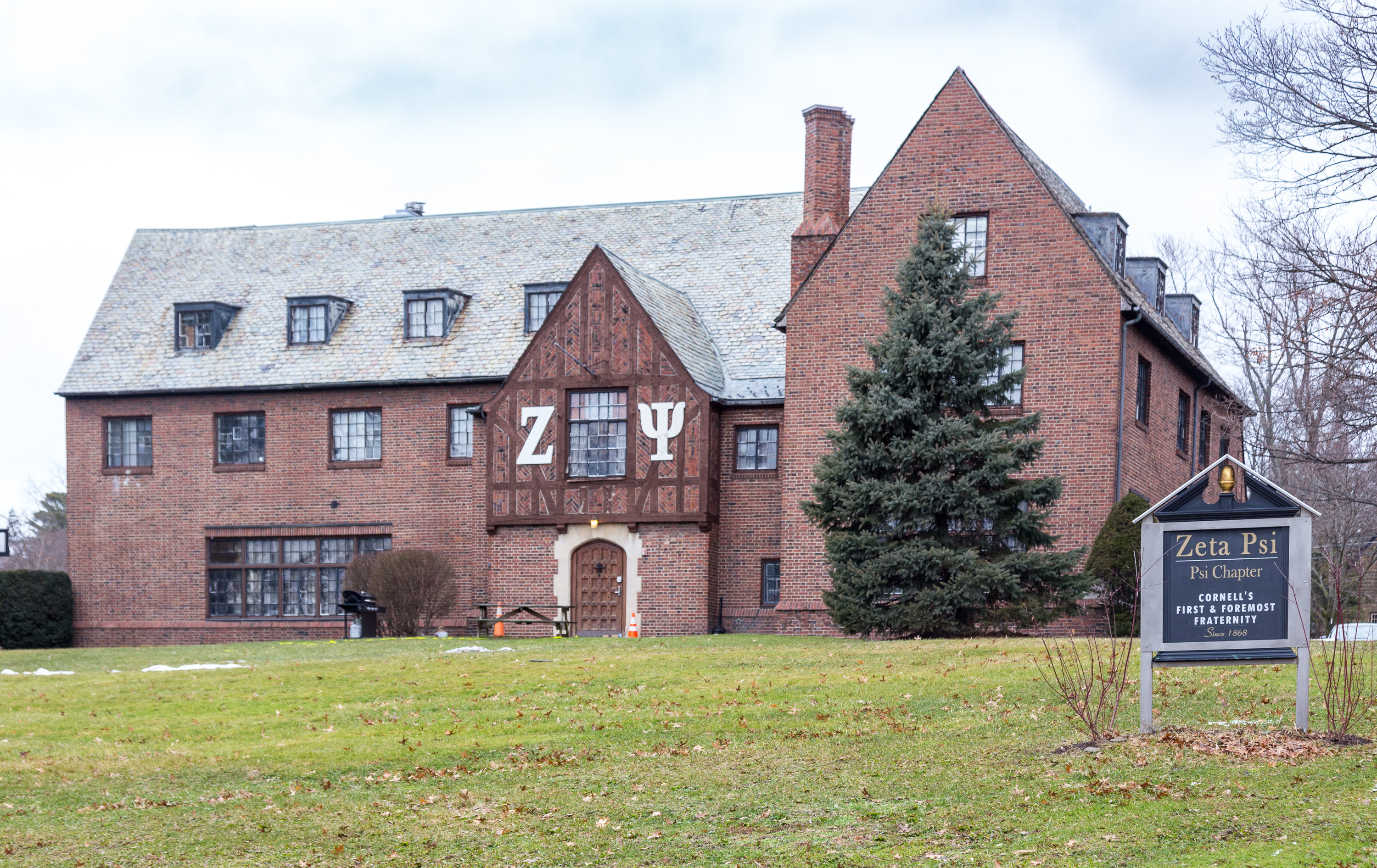
Zeta Psi house at Cornell

The end of the 19th century, Zeta Psi established fourteen chapters: Omega was founded at University of Chicago in 1864; Pi at Rensselaer Polytechnic Institute in 1865; Lambda at Bowdoin College, 1867; Beta at University of Virginia, 1868; Psi at Cornell University, 1868; Iota at UC Berkeley, 1870; Gamma, first at the US Naval Academy in 1874, and then at Syracuse College in 1875 after the government proscribed Fraternities at its military academies; Theta Xi at University of Toronto, 1879; Alpha at Columbia University, 1879; Alpha Psi at McGill University, 1883; Nu at Case Western Reserve, 1884; Eta at Yale University, 1889; Mu at Stanford, 1892; Alpha Beta at University of Minnesota, 1899. The establishment of the Eta at Yale briefly made Zeta Psi the only fraternity to have chapters at all eight Ivy-League schools.

By the turn of the century, the need for some more centralized structure pressed. In 1909, The Circle of Zeta Psi, an international publication concerning the affairs of the fraternity and its members was first published by Brother William Comstock. In its first issue, Comstock criticized the degree of individualism among the chapters of Zeta Psi, demanding unity among such disparate brothers and a "systemic central organization". The fraternity promptly adopted his suggestions to appoint a general secretary to travel between chapters and established a Zeta Psi Educational Foundation to support the fraternity's financial needs.

=== 1914–1920: World War I ===
In 1914, World War I began. When Great Britain entered the war, Canada willingly answered the call. The chapters most affected were the Alpha Psi and Theta Xi chapters at McGill and U Toronto. In 1914, their brothers were heading east across the sea to the war. In 1915, more than half the workers at the McGill Base Hospital were Zetes from Alpha Psi. By war's end, the two beleaguered chapters had sent two hundred of the brothers; 31 were never to return and many others came home wounded.

Among those Canadian brothers who went overseas is Lt. Col. Brother Dr. John McCrae (Θ Ξ '94), a serviceman in the Canadian army, who did not return at the close of the conflict. Brother McCrae is famous for his poem "In Flanders Fields." The words are a testament to the heroic spirit in man. Brother Frederick Fisher of the McGill chapter was the first Canadian to win the Victoria Cross in the war, the highest British award for valour, for his determined stand at the Second Battle of Ypres, awarded posthumously.

In 1917, the United States entered World War I, and so did many Zetes. At the annual convention of Zeta Psi, the brothers adopted a resolution in support of U.S. engagement in World War I, which the U.S. Congress had only declared a few weeks previously:

WHEREAS, The United States of America has been forced into the World War in defense of its national honor and for the protection of international justice and democracy;
BE IT RESOLVED, That the Zeta Psi Fraternity of North America, at the Seventieth Annual Convention assembled at Raleigh, North Carolina, hereby pledges to the President and Congress of the United States of America its unqualified support of whatever war measures the Government may deem necessary and expedient, and places at the disposal of the Government its national organization, its Chapters, and its individual members, for service in whatever capacities the government may direct.

Over one-quarter of all Zeta Psi members served during World War I and many did not return. Zeta Psi also provided the nation its first Assistant Secretary of War, Benedict Crowell (Η '91), noted for his reorganization of civilian military control during the war.

=== 1920–1945: interwar years and World War II ===
In the 1920s, Zeta Psi celebrated its 75th anniversary in 1922 with festivities in New York City. Notably, both the Grand Army of the Republic and the United Confederate Veterans had elected Zeta Psi brothers as their commanders-in-chief that year.

The onset of World War II had a profound impact on the fraternity. Many chapters, including the Psi chapter at Cornell University, saw significant declines in active membership due to the draft. The Psi chapter's original house was lost in a fire in the late 1940s and was never rebuilt. Nebraska Wesleyan University closed in 1943 and was reactivated in 1945.

=== 1945–2000: postwar expansion and challenges ===
The postwar period marked a phase of growth and modernization for Zeta Psi. The fraternity expanded its presence, establishing new chapters and reactivating dormant ones. During the latter half of the 20th century, Zeta Psi faced challenges common to many fraternities, including shifts in campus culture and attitudes toward Greek life.

=== 21st century: global expansion ===
Zeta Psi expanded internationally in the 21st century. In 2008, the fraternity established the Iota Omicron chapter at the University of Oxford, marking its first chapter outside North America. This expansion was soon followed by new chapters at the University of St Andrews in Scotland (2011; inactive from 2014), Trinity College Dublin in Ireland (2012), the University of Paris in France (2019), and the American University of Greece in Athens (2023). As of 2026, there is also an 'interest group' at the University of St. Gallen in Switzerland.

Zeta Psi's headquarters is located in Pearl River, New York.

== Symbols ==
The Zeta Psi badge consists of the Greek letters ΖΨ in gold with the letters O and A engraved on the Ζ. and the arms of the Ψ engraved, with a Roman fasces upon the right and a star upon the left. The badge is set with 21 stones of pearl or jet, placed on the bars of the Ζ. Its pledge pin is a white circle with a narrow gold outline.

Zeta Psi's motto is ΤΚΦ (Tau Kappa Phi). The fraternity's color is white. Its flower is the white carnation. The flag of the Zeta Psi is a white field with the Greek letters ΖΨ or the words Zeta Psi written in the center in gold, piped in black. Its publication is The Circle. Its members are called Zetes.

== Publications ==
First published in 1859, with two later editions in 1867 and 1883, the Catalogue of the Zeta Psi Fraternity contained names of members of the fraternity arranged by chapters and years of initiation. In 1874, the Addenda to the Catalogue of the Zeta Psi Fraternity 1867-1874. In 1888, the title was changed to the Directory of the Zeta Psi Fraternity and contact information was added for members of the Fraternity. The Directory was published in 1889, 1893, 1910, 1912, 1913, 1916, 1922, 1926, 1932, 1953, 1987, 1992, and 1998. The Semicentennial Biographical Catalogue of the Zeta Psi Fraternity of North America was published in 1899. This volume contains biographies of over 4,000 members of Zeta Psi and historical information about each chapter. The Directory continues to be published regularly and the modern version is a useful networking tool for members of the Zeta Psi Fraternity.

First published in 1871 by undergraduate members of Psi chapter at Cornell University, Songs of the Zeta Psi Fraternity contains a collection of songs about the Zeta Psi Fraternity. Later editions appeared in 1890, 1897, 1903, 1914, and 1958. The Chapter, a brief compilation of poems, was also written by members of the Zeta Psi Fraternity in 1869.

Published in 1903, The Jubilee of the Zeta Psi Fraternity of North America is a record of the fiftieth anniversary of the Zeta Psi Fraternity. Likewise, The Double Diamond Jubilee of the Zeta Psi Fraternity of North America published in 1997, was an account of the one hundred and fiftieth anniversary of the Zeta Psi Fraternity, made to complement The Story of Zeta Psi. Both volumes include historical information on the fraternity and its chapters. Published in 1928, with two later editions, The Story of Zeta Psi contains the detailed history of the fraternity and each chapter founded up to the point of publication.

First published in June 1909, The Circle is the annual publication of the fraternity. The corresponding secretary files a report for The Circle every year. The Circle was preceded by other periodic publications that were unsuccessful. These publications were The Zeta Psi Monthly published in 1883; The Zeta Psi Quarterly published from 1884 to 1886; and The Bulletin of the Zeta Psi Fraternity of North America first published in 1897.

First published in 1942, the Pledge Manual of the Zeta Psi Fraternity of North America remains in publication and is an important source of information for men pledging the Zeta Psi Fraternity.

== Chapters ==
Zeta Psi operates as chapters in eight countries: United States, Canada, United Kingdom, Ireland, France, Greece, Spain and Morocco. For each undergraduate chapter at a campus, there is a corresponding elder chapter composed of alumni members.

=== Geographical associations ===
Geographical associations mostly base their membership on alumni living in a metropolitan area. Active geographical associations (as of 2006):

- Zeta Psi Washington, D.C. Elders Association
- Zeta Psi New York City Elders Association
- Philly Zete RAC
- Zeta Psi Chicago Alumni Club
- Zeta Psi Boston Alumni Club
- Zeta Psi Arizona Alumni Club
- Zeta Psi Dallas Alumni Club
- Houston Association of Zeta Psi
- Southern California Association of Zeta Psi Alumni
- Zeta Psi Alumni Association of Greater Pittsburgh
- Zeta Psi Elders Association of Durham
- Zeta Psi Elders Association of Toronto
- Zeta Psi Alumni of Cleveland
- Zeta Psi of Texas

== Governance ==
=== Chapters ===
Zeta Psi is a democracy and has legislative, judicial, and executive branches of governance. Each chapter meeting with due quorum has the authority to act as the legislative organ of the chapter. Most chapters run their meetings with parliamentary rules of order. The Supreme Council is the chapter's only judicial body. It has the authority to rule on almost any matter, and its proceedings are held in camera. It is composed of the Phi (president) and Alpha Phi (vice president) and at least three elected members-at-large.

=== Elder chapters ===
An elder chapter has a similar organizational structure to the active chapter, with Greek-letter officers and a supreme council. The elder chapter has the same name as the active chapter but has different organization, powers, and is legally a separate entity. Elder chapters are also required to hold annual chapter meetings to serve as a legislative body.

There are six Greek-letter officers in the elder chapter that act as its executive.

- Phi – Φ – Elder President
- Alpha Phi – ΑΦ – Elder Vice-president
- Sigma – Σ – Elder Secretary
- Gamma – Γ – Elder Treasurer
- Delta – Δ – Elder historian
- Beta Pi – ΒΠ – Elder advisor to the active chapter

=== Geographical associations ===
Geographical associations are similar to elder chapters, in that they are composed of alumni and have a vote at Grand Chapter.

=== Grand Chapter ===
The Grand Chapter is composed of the seven grand officers and one voting delegate from each active and elder chapter and geographical association. The Grand Chapter has complete authority over Zeta Psi. The Grand Chapter has a similar organizational structure to the active chapter, with Greek-letter officers but with an executive committee in place of a supreme council.

Grand Chapter has the same number and function of Greek-letter officers however, the name has an additional "alpha" to denote it as different. At one point in time, there were several appointed officers each designated Chi Phi Alpha (ΧΦΑ) of a particular area (e.g. Canada, or the Northwest United States) which served as geographical representatives to the Grand Chapter.

- Phi Alpha – ΦΑ – President and executive head
- Alpha Phi Alpha – ΑΦΑ – Vice-president
- Sigma Alpha – ΣΑ – Secretary
- Alpha Sigma Alpha – ΑΣΑ – Corresponding secretary
- Gamma Alpha – ΓΑ – Treasurer and fiscal officer
- Delta Alpha – ΔΑ – Fraternity historian
- Sigma Rho Alpha – ΣΡΑ – Sergeant-at-arms

The Board of Delegates elects the Grand Chapter officers at the fraternity's annual meeting. The executive committee is constituted as follows: "Phi Alpha, Alpha Phi Alpha, Sigma Alpha, Gamma Alpha, Delta Alpha, and four (4) representatives duly elected at large from the Fraternity, with the provision that at least one member of the Committee must be from Canada and at least one must be from the United States."

== Zeta Psi in popular culture ==
- Steve Berman, who was a member of the Beta Tau chapter at Tulane University, featured the fraternity in his short story "His Mouth Will Taste of Chernobyl".

== See also ==
- List of social fraternities
