= John Croak =

Canadian recipient of the Victoria Cross

Private John Croak VC
- John Croak in uniform.
- Born: John Bernard Croak; 18 May 1892; Little Bay, Newfoundland Colony
- Died: 8 August 1918 (aged 26); Hangard Wood, France
- Burial place: Hangard Wood British Cemetery, France
- Military career
- Allegiance: Dominion of Canada
- Branch: Canadian Militia: Canadian Expeditionary Force
- Service years: 1915 – 1918
- Rank: Private
- Units: 55th (New Brunswick & Prince Edward Island) Battalion; 1st Canadian Division: 3rd Canadian Infantry Brigade; 13th (Royal Highlanders of Canada) Battalion
- Conflicts: World War I: Western Front; Nivelle Offensive; Battle of Arras; Battle of Vimy Ridge; Battle of Hill 70; Battle of Passchendaele; Hundred Days Offensive; Battle of Amiens †
- Awards: Victoria Cross
- Other work: Coal miner

John Bernard Croak VC (May 18, 1892 – August 8, 1918) was a soldier in the Canadian Expeditionary Force during the First World War and posthumous recipient of the Victoria Cross, the highest and most prestigious award for gallantry "in the face of the enemy" that can be awarded to British and Commonwealth forces. He earned the award for events that occurred during the Battle of Amiens in August 1918. A park and elementary school was named in his memory at Glace Bay, Nova Scotia.

== Early life ==
Croak (Note: The Newfoundland spelling of his surname is "Croke," but he preferred "Croak".) was born in Little Bay in Newfoundland, on May 18, 1892, to James and Cecelia Croak. The family moved to Glace Bay, Nova Scotia when Croak was two years old. He attended school there and then, at the age of 14, began work as a coal miner.

== First World War ==
In 1915, Croak enlisted in the Canadian Army and volunteered for service abroad with the Canadian Expeditionary Force. Posted to the 55th Battalion as a private, he embarked for Europe in November 1915. He soon transferred to the 13th Battalion, which was serving on the Western Front as part of 3rd Brigade, 1st Canadian Division. Through 1917 and the early part of 1918, Croak participated in several engagements as part of 13th Battalion; these included the Battles of Vimy Ridge, Hill 70 and Passchendaele.

On 8 August 1918, the opening day of the Battle of Amiens, and the beginning of the Hundred Days Offensive, the 3rd Brigade, accompanied by a battalion of tanks, was at the forefront of the 1st Division's advance. The 13th Battalion became held up by machine gun posts in the vicinity of Hangard Wood. Croak attacked a machine gun post and took several prisoners whom he escorted to his company headquarters. Ignoring instructions to seek medical treatment for a wound to his arm, he carried out an attack on another machine gun post nearby. He was wounded again, this time fatally, in the act, and died that same day. He was recognised for his actions with an award of the Victoria Cross (VC). (Note: Lance Sergeant Herman Good (29 November 1887 – 18 April 1969), another soldier of 13th Battalion, was also awarded the VC for his actions at Hangard Wood.) The VC, instituted in 1856, was the highest award for valour that could be bestowed on a soldier of the British Empire. The citation for Croak's VC read:

For most conspicuous bravery in attack when having become separated from his section he encountered a machine gun nest, which he bombed and silenced, taking the gun and crew prisoners. Shortly afterwards he was severely wounded, but refused to desist. Having rejoined his platoon, a very strong point, containing several machine guns, was encountered. Private Croak, however, seeing an opportunity, dashed forward alone and was almost immediately followed by the remainder of the platoon in a brilliant charge. He was the first to arrive at the trench line, into which he led his men, capturing three machine guns and bayonetting or capturing the entire garrison. The perseverance and valour of this gallant soldier, who was again severely wounded, and died of his wounds, were an inspiring example to all.

— The London Gazette, No. 30922, September 24, 1918

Croak is buried at Hangard Wood British Cemetery, which is located 12 miles south west of Albert. His VC, the first to be awarded to a soldier born in Newfoundland, was presented to his mother at Government House in Halifax by MacCallum Grant, the Lieutenant Governor of Nova Scotia, on 23 November 1918.

In Glace Bay, where Croak grew up, there is both a school and a Royal Canadian Legion named in his honor. There is also a park, located on the site of his former workplace, the Dominion No. 2 Colliery, named for him as well. In 1992, the park was the scene of the unveiling of a memorial plaque, made of Cape Breton rock, to Croak.

== The medal ==
In 1972 Croak's medals, which included the British War Medal and the Victory Medal in addition to the VC, were gifted by his nephew to the Army Museum at the Citadel in Halifax, Nova Scotia. The medals are now displayed at the Canadian War Museum.
