= 13th Battalion (Royal Highlanders of Canada), CEF =

- Active: 1914-1919
- Country: Canada
- Branch: Canadian Expeditionary Force
- Type: Infantry
- Size: One Battalion
- Part of: 3rd Canadian Brigade, 1st Canadian Division
- Garrison/HQ: Montreal, Quebec
- Engagements: First World War
- Battle honours: Ypres and along the Western Front.

The 13th Battalion (Royal Highlanders of Canada) of the Canadian Expeditionary Force was an active service battalion during the First World War.

== History ==
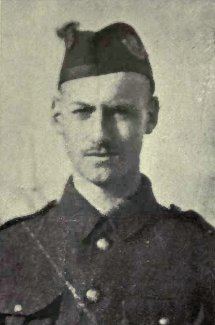
Victoria Cross recipient Frederick Fisher

The battalion was formed from volunteers from the 5th Regiment "Royal Highlanders of Canada", a militia regiment based in Montreal, as well as men from other militia regiments. Sent to England as part of the First Contingent in September 1914, the 13th Battalion became part of the 3rd Brigade of the 1st Canadian Division. The 3rd Brigade consisted of the 13th Battalion (the Royal Highlanders of Canada), the 14th Battalion (the Royal Montreal Regiment), the 15th Battalion (the 48th Highlanders of Canada) and the 16th Battalion (the Canadian Scottish).

The battalion's first commander was Lieutenant Colonel (later Major-General) Frederick Loomis.

The 1st Canadian Division served on the Western Front from April 1915 until the armistice in November 1918. Its baptism of fire occurred at the Second Battle of Ypres in April 1915, when the German Army used chlorine gas for the first time in war. Neighbouring French divisions fled in terror from the new weapon, but the Canadians held the line at tremendous cost.

The 1st Canadian Division fought in every major engagement involving the Canadian Corps, including the Second Battle of Ypres in 1915, the Somme in 1916, Vimy Ridge and Passchendaele in 1917, and the Pursuit to Mons in 1918.

Three members of the 13th Battalion were awarded the Victoria Cross. The first, Frederick Fisher, awarded for his action on 23 April 1915 at St. Julien during the Second Battle of Ypres. Two other members, Herman James Good and John Bernard Croak, were awarded their crosses for action on 8 August 1918 at Hangard Wood, near Amiens in France. Croak's award was posthumous.

After the armistice, the 13th Battalion returned to Canada and was disbanded in April, 1919. On December 1, 1920, the 13th Battalion was perpetuated by the 1st Battalion of the newly reorganised the Royal Highlanders of Canada.

A wooden cross memorial originally erected at Vimy Ridge but later erected at the Canadian War Museum is dedicated to the 13th Canadian Battalion the Royal Highlanders of Canada killed in action Vimy Ridge April 1917.

== Battle honours ==
In 1929, the battalion was awarded the following battle honours.

- Ypres, 1915, '17 (Note: Selected to be borne on colours and appointments)
- Gravenstafel
- St. Julien
- Festubert, 1915
- Mount Sorrel
- Somme, 1916
- Pozières
- Thiepval
- Ancre Heights
- Arras, 1917, '18
- Vimy, 1917
- Arleux
- Scarpe, 1917, '18
- Hill 70
- Passchendaele
- Amiens
- Drocourt–Quéant
- Hindenburg Line
- Canal du Nord
- Pursuit to Mons
- France and Flanders, 1915–18

== See also ==
- List of infantry battalions in the Canadian Expeditionary Force
