= Battle of Verrières Ridge =

Series of engagements, part of the Battle of Normandy, World War II

Coordinates: 49.1104°N 0.3324°W

- Part of Operations Atlantic and Spring
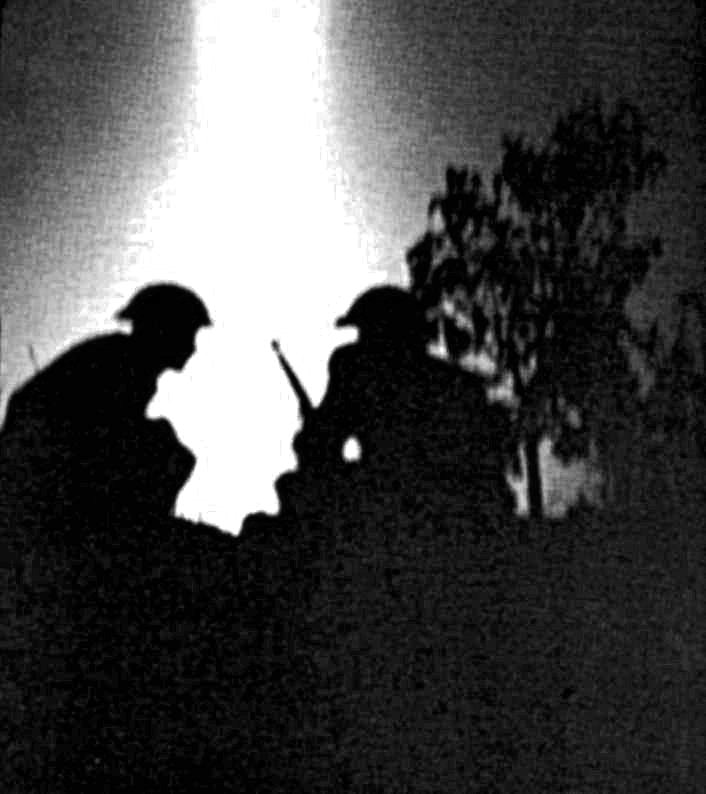
- Canadian soldiers under fire near Fleury-sur-Orne in the early hours of 25 July 1944
Date	19–25 July 1944
Location	Verrières Ridge, 8 km (5.0 mi) south of Caen, Normandy, France
Result	German defensive victory

Belligerents
Canada	Germany

Commanders and leaders
(Canada) Guy Simonds (Canada) Charles Foulkes	(Nazi Germany) Günther von Kluge (Nazi Germany) Sepp Dietrich (Nazi Germany) Kurt Meyer (Nazi Germany) Wilhelm Bittrich

Strength
2 Infantry Divisions, 1 Armoured Brigade	2 Panzer Divisions remnants of 1 Panzer Division; 1 Infantry Division

Casualties and losses
800 killed^{[a]} 2,000 wounded or captured	1,226 men^{[a]} 11 Panzer IV tanks and 10 Sturmgeschütz III
- ^[a] Discussed in detail in Casualties

The Battle of Verrières Ridge was a series of engagements fought as part of the Battle of Normandy, in Calvados, during the Second World War. The main combatants were two Canadian infantry divisions—with additional support from the Canadian 2nd Armoured Brigade—against elements of three German SS Panzer divisions. The battle was part of the British and Canadian attacks south of Caen, and took place from 19 to 25 July 1944, being part of Operation Atlantic (18–21 July) and Operation Spring (25–27 July).

The immediate Allied objective was Verrières Ridge, a belt of high ground which dominates the route from Caen to Falaise. The ridge was occupied by battle-hardened German veterans, who had fallen back from Caen and entrenched to form a strong defensive position. Over the course of six days, substantial Canadian and British forces made repeated attempts to capture the ridge. Strict German adherence to defensive doctrine, as well as strong and effective counterattacks by Panzer formations, resulted in many Allied casualties for little tactical gain.

From the perspective of the First Canadian Army, the battle is remembered for its tactical and strategic miscalculations—the most notable being a controversial attack by The Black Watch (Royal Highland Regiment) of Canada on 25 July, in which 315 of its 325 soldiers were killed, wounded or captured. This attack—the costliest single day for a Canadian battalion since the 1942 Dieppe Raid—is one of the more critically analysed events in Canadian military history. While failing to achieve its original objective, an influential strategic result of the Battle of Verrières Ridge was to aid the successful Operation Cobra, by tying down powerful German Panzer formations that might otherwise have been moved to counter-attack Cobra.

== Background ==
Verrières Ridge lies 8 km (5.0 mi) south of the city of Caen, overlooking broad plains and dominating the land between Caen and Falaise. Although an important D-Day objective for Commonwealth forces, the Allied push inland was halted short of Caen and positional warfare ensued until the first week of July. On 9 July, Operation Charnwood captured the northern half of the city but the I SS Panzer Corps maintained defensive positions in the remainder of Caen. A week later, Operation Goodwood renewed the British offensive and Caen finally fell on 19 July; by this time the city had been destroyed. The next Anglo-Canadian goal was the town of Falaise but Verrières Ridge—now strongly defended by the I SS Panzer Corps—stood in their path. Elements of the British Second Army secured part of the adjacent Bourguébus Ridge and managed to gain a foothold on Verrières Ridge but were unable to dislodge its German defenders.

== Forces involved ==
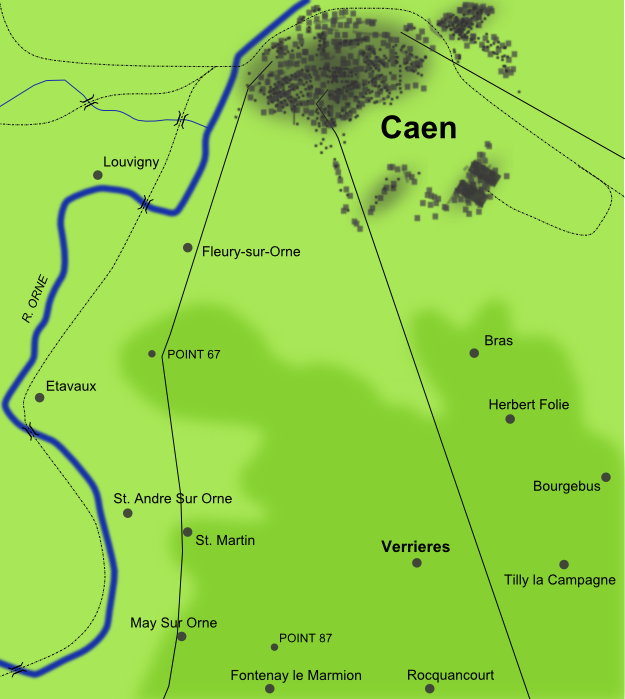
The geography of Verrières Ridge and the surrounding area

The Canadian II Corps (Lieutenant-General Guy Simonds) assigned two infantry divisions and one armoured brigade to the assault on the German positions around Verrières. The Canadian 3rd Infantry Division—having suffered many casualties during the first six weeks of the Normandy campaign—was given a supporting role. The main effort was to be made by the fresh, though relatively inexperienced, Canadian 2nd Infantry Division, along with the tanks of the Canadian 2nd Armoured Brigade. Additional forces were later made available in the shape of three divisions from the British I Corps: the 51st (Highland) Division, the Guards Armoured Division, and the British 7th Armoured Division. Despite having significantly more combat experience than their Canadian counterparts, the British units played a minor part in the battle.

While British forces had been attacking Caen, elements of the I SS Panzer Corps, part of Army Group B (Generalfeldmarschall Günther von Kluge) had turned Verrières Ridge into their main defensive position along the Anglo-Canadian front. Although not particularly high, the ridge's topography meant that advancing forces would be exposed to fire from German positions across the River Orne, from the ridge and from the nearby German-held industrial hamlet of St. Martin. The 12th SS and 1st SS Panzer Divisions held the ridge supported by artillery, dug-in Tiger tanks and mortar emplacements. The 9th SS Panzer Division was held in reserve. Further support was available from the 272nd Grenadier Infantry Division (a force composed mainly of Russians and Poles that had been raised in 1943), the 116th Panzer Division and a battalion of Tiger tanks.

== Battle ==
=== Attack of Calgary Highlanders ===
In a follow-up to Operation Goodwood on 19 July, the Calgary Highlanders attempted to take the northern spur of Verrières Ridge but German mortar fire limited their progress. (Note: Calgary Highlanders Official Battle Honours, Calgary Highlanders Regimental Museum.) Tanks from the Sherbrooke Fusiliers were sent to support the battalion and eliminated several machine-gun positions on either side of Point 67. The Highlanders eventually managed to dig in, despite accurate return fire. Over the next few hours, they strengthened their position and the 5th and 6th Canadian Infantry Brigades made repeated attempts to exploit the gains. Against a tenacious German defence and minor infantry and tank counter-attacks, the Canadians were broadly repulsed with heavy casualties. Simonds rapidly prepared a new offensive for the following day, with the goals of capturing both the eastern side of the Orne river and the main slopes of Verrières Ridge.

=== Operation Atlantic ===
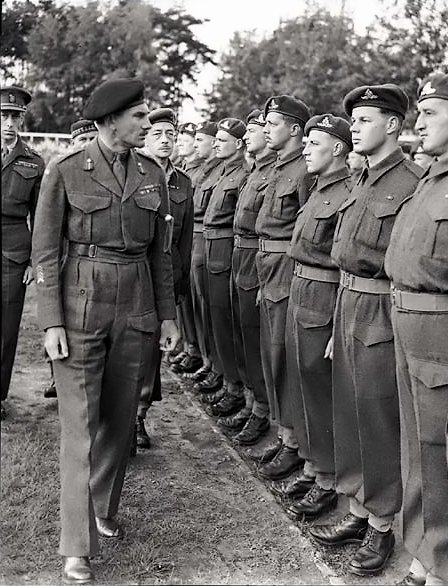
Lieutenant-General Guy Simonds, the senior Canadian commander for the battle, during an inspection tour after VE-Day.

The next attack took place on 20 July as part of Operation Atlantic. It was led by the South Saskatchewan Regiment, with supporting units from the Queen's Own Cameron Highlanders of Canada. In the early hours of 20 July, the Camerons secured a position in Saint-André-sur-Orne but were quickly pinned down by German infantry and tanks.

At the same time, the South Saskatchewan Regiment moved directly up the slopes of Verrières Ridge, supported by tanks and Hawker Typhoon ground attack aircraft. The Canadian attack faltered in torrential rain, which rendered air support useless and turned the ground into mud. Counter-attacks by two Panzer divisions threw the South Saskatchewans back past their support lines and their supporting battalion—the Essex Scottish—came under attack.

The Essex Scottish lost over 300 men as it tried to hold back the advance of the 12th SS Panzer Division, while to the east the remainder of I SS Panzer Corps engaged British forces in Operation Goodwood, the largest armoured battle of the campaign. By the end of the day, the South Saskatchewans had taken 282 casualties and the ridge was still in enemy hands.

Despite these setbacks, Simonds was adamant that Verrières Ridge should be taken and sent in the Black Watch of Canada and the Calgary Highlanders to stabilise the precarious Allied position. Minor counter-attacks by both battalions on 21 July managed to contain Dietrich's armoured formations and by the time the operation was called off, Canadian forces held several footholds on the ridge, including a now secure position on Point 67. Four German divisions still held the ridge. In all, the actions around Verrières Ridge during Operation Atlantic accounted for over 1,300 Allied casualties.

=== Operation Spring ===
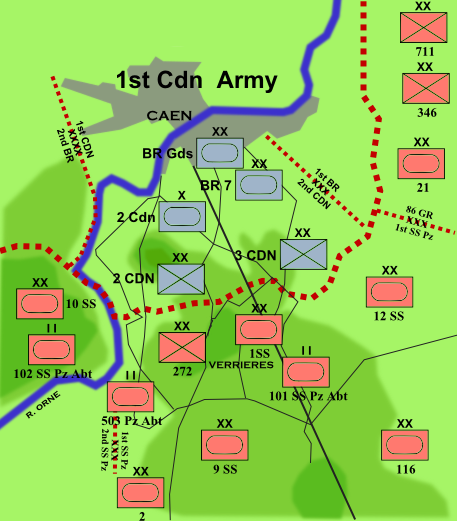
The start lines of Operation Spring, showing layout of divisional and battalion forces for both sides

With the capture of Caen on 19 July, an Anglo-Canadian breakout had become strategically feasible. In the American sector, Lieutenant General Omar Bradley—commander of the U.S. 1st Army—had been planning his own breakout (codenamed Operation Cobra) and Simonds too began preparing a new offensive, codenamed Operation Spring. Spring was originally conceived by Field Marshal Bernard Montgomery as a "holding attack", designed to tie down German forces while Cobra was under way. On 22 July, with Operation Atlantic having failed to achieve its aims, Simonds changed the objective of Operation Spring to a breakout offensive. With Verrières Ridge taken, Simonds could launch armour and artillery attacks from its southern flank to push the Germans further back. This would clear the Caen-Falaise road and his two British armoured divisions could then advance south to Falaise.

Operation Spring was scheduled in four timed phases. The Calgary Highlanders would attack Bourguébus Ridge and May-sur-Orne to secure the flanks of the main thrust, which was to be a move on Verrières Ridge by the Black Watch, along with armoured support from the British 7th Armoured Division and the 4th Canadian (Armoured) Division. The plan called for the offensive to start on 23 July but poor weather led to a postponement for 48 hours. Taking advantage of this respite, the I SS Panzer Corps reinforced the ridge with an additional four battalions, 480 tanks and 500 guns. Allied Intelligence learned of this reinforcement through Ultra signals intercepts and advised Simonds's headquarters.

On 25 July, two days later than originally planned owing to the weather, Operation Spring was launched. The Black Watch were scheduled to begin their attack at about 05:30 from an assembly area at Saint-Martin, 6 km (3.7 mi) south of Caen. The Canadians ran into heavy German resistance on the Saint-Martin road and did not arrive at their assembly area until close to 08:00. By that time, the Black Watch's two highest-ranking officers had been killed and command fell to Major Phil Griffin. At 08:30, he met with 5th Brigade commander, Brigadier General W. J. Megill and despite the non-arrival of most of their promised armoured support, the decision was taken for the attack to proceed.

At 09:30, as the Canadian infantry regiments advanced up the ridge, they were easy targets for the well-entrenched German machine gun nests and mortar pits, supported by tanks, 88 mm (3.46 in) anti-tank guns, and Nebelwerfer rocket artillery. To make matters worse, the Black Watch communications were knocked out within minutes of the start of their assault. Very few members of the Black Watch Regiment managed to make it to the crest of the ridge and those who did were subjected to an even heavier bombardment as they ran into the counter-attacking forces of the 272nd Infantry Division and the 9th SS Kampfgruppe Sterz. Of the 325 men that left the assembly area, 315 were killed, wounded or captured. The Black Watch lost all its senior commanders, including Major Phil Griffin, with two companies virtually annihilated.

== Aftermath ==
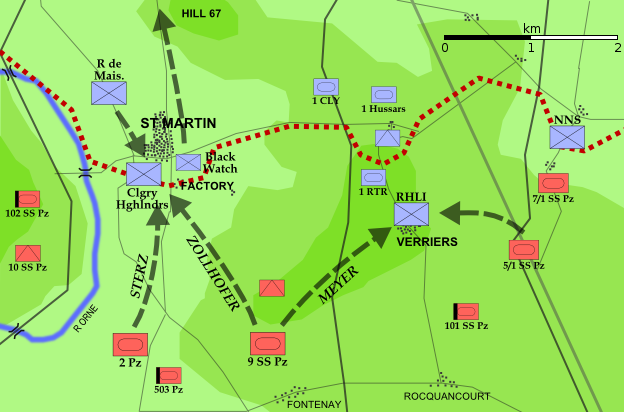
German counter-attacks in the aftermath of Operation Spring, 25–26 July 1944

All of the gains made by the Black Watch and Calgary Highlanders were lost to German counterattacks, which inflicted heavy losses on the Highlanders and the previously unscathed Black Watch support company. The Black Watch had to be reformed after Verrières Ridge, having sustained more casualties than any Canadian infantry battalion since the disastrous 1942 raid on Dieppe. (Note: The Essex Scottish Regiment suffered heavier losses over the course of the entire war, although many of these were taken in the Dieppe Raid, to which the Black Watch contributed only a company.)

The central area of the ridge near Verrières Village was eventually taken and held by the Royal Hamilton Light Infantry. The east side was also taken, but subsequently lost, although two British armoured brigades were able to secure significant footholds near the positions of the Royal Hamilton Light Infantry.

The failure to capture the ridge had little effect on the overall Allied position, as the success of Operation Cobra was so overwhelming that the Germans diverted significant resources, including two Panzer divisions, from the ridge in their attempt to keep Bradley's forces boxed in. With German defences weakened, subsequent Commonwealth attacks on the ridge were successful; Operation Totalize finally managed to wrest the position from its SS defenders on 8 August.

=== Casualties ===
Allied casualty figures for the battle as a whole were not produced but can be inferred by examining the two operations. The accepted toll for Operation Atlantic is 1,349, with about 300 fatalities. Operation Spring's losses were about 500 killed with a further 1,000 captured or wounded. Working from these figures, historians estimate around 800 Canadian dead and 2,000 wounded or captured. The Canadian dead are buried in Bretteville-sur-Laize Canadian War Cemetery, between Caen and Falaise.

The Canadian Official Historian Charles Stacey, and military historian Michael Reynolds, wrote that German casualty figures for individual operations are difficult to determine. Stacey attributes this to the gradual degradation of the German logistics chain, leaving incomplete records, and Reynolds wrote that units sometimes over-reported their losses, in the hope of receiving more reinforcements.

German losses for the battle were significantly fewer than those suffered by the Canadians. According to Reynolds, between 16 July and 1 August, the 1st SS Panzer Division lost 1,092 men killed, wounded or captured—along with 11 Panzer IV tanks and 10 Sturmgeschütz III self-propelled guns—in fighting across all its fronts including at Verrières. Over a similar period, he estimates the 12th SS Panzer Division—in all sectors—suffered only 134 casualties. Many of the German fallen are buried at La Cambe German war cemetery.

== Historiography and controversy ==
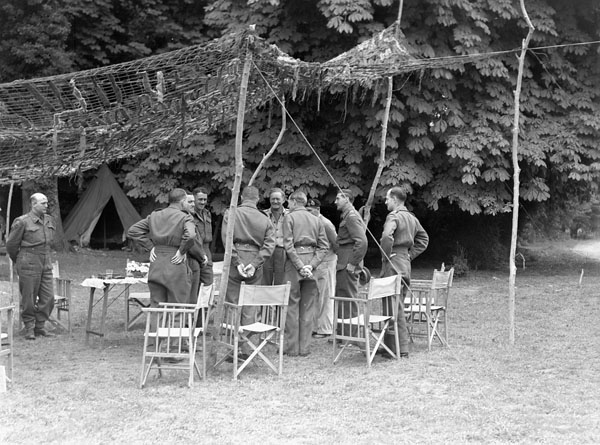
Field Marshal Montgomery (third from right) talking with Simonds (second from right) at II Canadian Corps Headquarters in Normandy, 20 July 1944

The Battle of Verrières Ridge, although given no particular prominence in German military history, is one of the First Canadian Army's most scrutinised actions. The matter was first brought to public attention by Stacey, who wrestled with the question of how to present the battle in the Official History of the Canadian Army in the Second World War and was required to make minor changes to the narrative of the battle by Simonds. When Stacey was writing the history, as senior historian of the Historical Section of the Canadian Army, Simonds was the Chief of the General Staff of the Canadian Army and so was effectively Stacey's superior.

The report on Operation Spring by Simonds was released after the war and blamed its failure on "11th hour reinforcement" of German lines and "strategically unsound execution on the part of Major Phillip Griffin and the Black Watch". Declassified wartime documents show that Simonds, along with several others in the Allied high command, had likely been notified on 23 July of a massive German build-up on the ridge. Some historians, including David O'Keefe and David Bercuson, accused Simonds of being careless with the lives of his men. Terry Copp and John A. English wrote that given the amount of pressure under which all Allied commanders were to break out from Normandy, Simonds probably had little choice in the decision he made.

The action of the Black Watch was most gallant but was tactically unsound in its detailed execution.

— General Guy Simonds, official Operation Spring report, January 1946

Operation Spring succeeded in its later-defined objective of a "holding attack" and aided the overwhelming success of Operation Cobra by tying down powerful German formations, which might otherwise have been in the American sector, and that precluded any immediate inquiry into its failure. The German commander of the Normandy Sector, Günther von Kluge, was at the Canadian front on 25 July, instead of the American front, where the eventual breakout occurred. The Battle of Verrières Ridge had little overall effect on British attempts to break out of Caen, as significant resources were transferred to the American front in the aftermath of Cobra to exploit Bradley's success. The ridge eventually fell to the general Allied advance.
