= Herman James Good =

Canadian World War I soldier and recipient of the Victoria Cross

Herman James Good VC
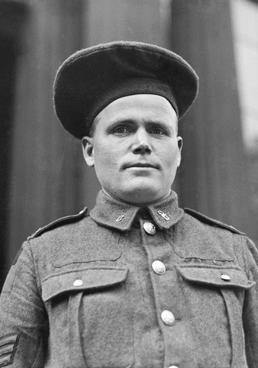
- Herman Good during the First World War
- Born: 29 November 1887; South Bathurst, New Brunswick, Canada
- Died: 18 April 1969 (aged 81); Bathurst, New Brunswick, Canada
- Burial place: Saint Albans Cemetery, Bathurst
- Military career
- Allegiance: Canada
- Branch: Canadian Expeditionary Force
- Service years: 1915–1919
- Rank: Lance Sergeant
- Units: 13th Battalion (Royal Highlanders of Canada)
- Conflicts: First World War: Western Front; Hundred Days Offensive; Battle of Amiens
- Awards: Victoria Cross
- Other work: Lumber worker Fish and game warden

Herman James Good VC (29 November 1887 – 18 April 1969) was a soldier in the Canadian Expeditionary Force during the First World War and a recipient of the Victoria Cross, the highest award for gallantry "in the face of the enemy" that can be awarded to British and Commonwealth forces. Good received the award for his actions during the Battle of Amiens in August 1918, while fighting around Hangard Wood. Good survived the war and returned to Canada. After his discharge from the military in 1919, Good worked in the lumber industry and then later as a fish and game warden. He died of a stroke in 1969, at the age of 81.

== Early life ==
Good was born on 29 November 1887 in South Bathurst, New Brunswick, Canada. He was one of fourteen children of Walter and Rebecca Good. He was educated at the local public school and involved in lumber operations in the area.

== First World War ==
On 29 June 1915, Good enlisted in the Canadian Expeditionary Force (CEF) on 29 June 1915 in Sussex, New Brunswick. He embarked for England in late October 1915. Arriving there the following month, he was posted to the 2nd Pioneer Battalion serving on the Western Front.

In April 1916, he transferred to the 13th (Royal Highlanders of Canada) Battalion, 3rd Brigade, 1st Canadian Division. Two months later, he received gunshot wounds to his buttocks which required six weeks of treatment before he could return to his unit. He experienced a bout of shell shock in early October and was in and out of care for the next several weeks. He was back with the 13th Battalion by early 1917. He became an acting lance corporal in mid-1917, following a further period in hospital with the mumps, and his rank was made substantive by the end of the year. In May 1918, he was promoted again, to corporal.

On 8 August 1918, the opening day of the Battle of Amiens, and the beginning of the Hundred Days Offensive, the 3rd Brigade, accompanied by a battalion of tanks, was at the forefront of the 1st Division's advance. The 13th Battalion had secured Aubercourt village but became held up by machine gun posts in the vicinity of Hangard Wood. At the head of his company, Good attacked the machine guns and put them out of action. Later in the day he located a battery of field guns and led a group of men in the capture of them. Good's battalion was able to push on to its objective and consolidate its positions. He was recognised for his deeds of 8 August 1918 by being awarded the Victoria Cross (VC). (Note: Private John Croak (26 January 1892 – 8 August 1918), also of 13th Battalion, was also awarded the VC, albeit posthumously, for his actions at Hangard Wood.) The VC, instituted in 1856, was the highest award for valour that could be bestowed on a soldier of the British Empire. The citation for Good's VC read:

For most conspicuous bravery and leading when in attack his company was held up by heavy fire from three enemy machine-guns, which were seriously delaying the advance. Realising the gravity of the situation, this N.C.O. dashed forward alone, killing several of the garrison, and capturing the remainder. Later on, Corporal Good, while alone, encountered a battery of 5-inch guns, which were in action at the time. Collecting three men of his section, he charged the battery under point-blank fire and captured the entire crews of three guns.

— The London Gazette, 27 September 1918

The next month, Good was promoted to lance sergeant. He received his VC in a ceremony at Buckingham Palace on 29 March 1919. Soon afterwards, Good returned to Canada aboard the RMS Olympic. He was formally discharged from the CEF on 26 April 1919.

== Later life ==
Good resumed his pre-war employment, working in the lumber industry. He later became a fish and game warden, serving in this capacity for 20 years. In his retirement, he lived in Bathurst, where on 13 April 1969 he suffered a stroke. He died five days later. After a funeral service at St George's Church, he was buried with military honours in St Alban's Cemetery in Bathurst. He was survived by two sons; his wife had predeceased him by several years as had a third son.

After his death, Good's VC was inherited by one of his sons; Frank Good. It, along with his other war service medals, is now held by the Canadian War Museum, which purchased them in December 2013.
