= 5th Canadian Division =

Former Canadian Army formation

5th Canadian Division; 1st Canadian Armoured Division; 5th Canadian (Armoured) Division
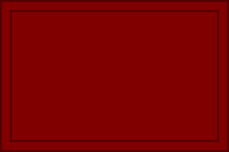
- 5th Canadian Division formation patch
- Active: February 1917–February 1918; 27 February 1941–12 December 1945; 2013–27 June 2026
- Country: Canada
- Branch: Canadian Expeditionary Force; Canadian Army
- Type: Infantry; Armoured
- Size: Division
- Nicknames: The Mighty Maroon Machine, Maroon 5
- Engagements: World War II: Italian Campaign; Operation Chesterfield; North-West Europe
- Website: www.canada.ca/en/army/corporate/5-canadian-division.html

Commanders
- Current commander: Brigadier-General J.D.S. Masson, OMM, MSM, CD
- Division CWO: Chief Warrant Officer M. von Kalben, MMM, CD
- Notable commanders: Garnet Hughes; Ernest William Sansom; Charles Ramsay Stirling Stein; Guy Simonds; E. L. M. Burns; Bert Hoffmeister

The 5th Canadian Division was a formation of the Canadian Army which was active during the First World War, the Second World War, and again from 2013 to 2026. It was first created as a formation of the Canadian Expeditionary Force in 1917 and stood down following the war. It was reactivated in 1941 through the renaming from '1st Canadian Armoured Division' to the 5th Canadian (Armoured) Division during the Second World War, and again stood down during demobilization. The 5th Canadian Division was again reactivated in 2013 with the renaming of the former Land Force Atlantic Area. At that time it was responsible for the command and mobilization of most army units in the provinces of New Brunswick, Nova Scotia, Prince Edward Island and Newfoundland and Labrador; as well as some units in Kingston, Ontario. The division again formally stood-down on 27 June 2026. Through all its iterations, the division was recognized by a distinctive maroon patch worn on the sleeve of its soldiers.

== First World War ==
The 5th Canadian Division of the Canadian Corps was formed during World War I under Major-General Garnet Burk Hughes. The 5th began assembling in Britain in February, 1917, but was broken up in February 1918 before it was fully formed. The Division adopted a coloured formation patch identical in design to that worn by the four combatant divisions of the Canadian Corps. Its men were used as reinforcements for the other four Canadian divisions, helping to maintain the over-strength Divisions of 22,000–25,000 with more than 100,000 men total. It was reactivated in 2013.

=== Infantry units ===
13th Canadian Brigade:

- 128th (Moose Jaw) Battalion Canadian Infantry. February 1917 – May 1917. Absorbed by the 15th Canadian Reserve Battalion;
- 134th (48th Highlanders) Battalion Canadian Infantry. February 1917 – February 1918. Absorbed by the 12th Canadian Reserve Battalion;
- 160th Battalion Canadian Infantry. February 1917 – February 1918. Absorbed by the 4th Canadian Reserve Battalion;
- 164th (Halton and Dufferin) Battalion Canadian Infantry. May 1917 – April 1918. Absorbed by the 8th Canadian Reserve Battalion;
- 202nd Battalion Canadian Infantry. February 1917 – May 28, 1918. Absorbed by the 9th Canadian Reserve Battalion;
- 208th Battalion Canadian Infantry. May 1917 – January 3, 1918. Absorbed by the 2nd and 3rd Canadian Reserve Battalions.

14th Canadian Brigade:

- 125th Battalion Canadian Infantry. February 1917 – April 16, 1918. Absorbed by the 8th Canadian Reserve Battalion;
- 150th (Carabiniers Mont Royal) Battalion Canadian Infantry. February 1917 – February 15, 1918. Absorbed by the 6th Canadian Reserve Battalion;
- 156th (Leeds and Grenville) Battalion Canadian Infantry. February 1917 – February 15, 1918. Absorbed by the 6th Canadian Reserve Battalion;
- 161st Battalion Canadian Infantry. February 1917 – February 15, 1918. Absorbed by the 4th Canadian Reserve Battalion.

15th Canadian Brigade:

- 104th (New Brunswick) Battalion Canadian Infantry. February 1917 – February 15, 1918. Absorbed by the 13th Canadian Reserve Battalion;
- 119th (Algoma) Battalion Canadian Infantry. February 1917 – April 16, 1918. Absorbed by the 8th Canadian Reserve Battalion;
- 185th (Cape Breton Highlanders) Battalion Canadian Infantry. February 1917 – February 15, 1918. Absorbed by the 17th Canadian Reserve Battalion;
- 198th (Canadian Buffs) Battalion Canadian Infantry. April 1917 – March 9, 1918. Absorbed by the 3rd Canadian Reserve Battalion;
- 199th (Duchess of Connaught's Own Irish Canadian Rangers) Battalion Canadian Infantry. February 1917 – April 1917. Absorbed by the 23rd Canadian Reserve Battalion.

Attached Troops:

- 164th (Halton and Dufferin) Battalion Canadian Infantry. February 1917 – May 1917. To the 13th Canadian Brigade;
- 198th (Canadian Buffs) Battalion Canadian Infantry. February 1917 – April 1917. To the 15th Canadian Brigade;
- 208th Battalion Canadian Infantry. February 1917 – May 1917. To the 13th Canadian Brigade;
- 236th (MacLean Highlanders) Battalion Canadian Infantry. February 1917 – May 1917. Disbanded on March 13, 1918.
- 12 Canadian Field Ambulance

== Second World War ==
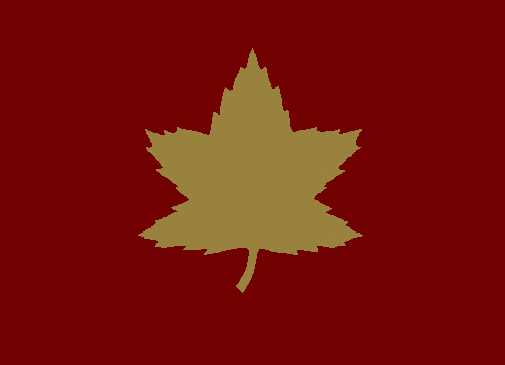
Formation patch used to identify vehicles of the 5th Canadian (Armoured) Division during the Second World War.

The 5th Canadian (Armoured) Division was a Canadian division during World War II. It was formed on 27 February 1941 as the 1st Canadian Armoured Division. However it was later redesignated as the 5th Canadian (Armoured) Division on 26 June 1941. Following its redesignation from 1st Canadian Armoured Division, the bulk proceeded overseas in one main convoy, arriving in the United Kingdom at the end of November 1941.

The 5th Canadian (Armoured) Division spent two years of the war uneventfully in the United Kingdom, before finally transferring to the Mediterranean theatre in November 1943 to join the 1st Canadian Infantry Division as part of I Canadian Corps, under command of the British Eighth Army. The division moved without its tanks and vehicles, inheriting heavily used equipment as a legacy from the veteran British 7th Armoured Division ("The Desert Rats") who they relieved on the Italian Front. The majority of the vehicles were completely worn out, having first been issued in North Africa or were two-wheel drive–useless in Italy. It took several months for the division to be fully equipped with new vehicles, including M4 Shermans. Only the 11th Canadian Infantry Brigade was committed prior to 31 January 1944.

The 5th Armoured took part in the Italian Campaign until the end of 1944, seeing notable action on the Hitler Line after the Allied breakthrough at Cassino in May 1944 and also during Operation Olive on the Gothic Line in August 1944. During the latter battle its single infantry brigade was augmented by a second, which was raised using reinforcements and units serving in other roles. Among them was the 4th Princess Louise Dragoon Guards–1st Canadian Division's armoured reconnaissance regiment. As with other Allied armoured divisions in the Mediterranean, local resources were used to establish an additional infantry brigade, the 12th Canadian Infantry Brigade. Based on the colour of its shoulder patch, the division became known as the "Mighty Maroon Machine".

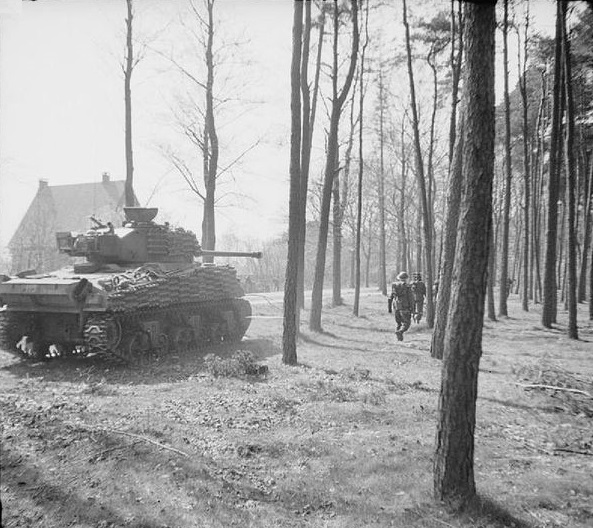
A Sherman Firefly of the 5th Canadian (Armoured) Division assists British troops of the 11th Battalion, Royal Scots Fusiliers, British 49th Infantry Division, to clear the Germans from Ede, the Netherlands, 17 April 1945.

In January 1945, the division, together with the 1st Canadian Infantry Division, as part of Operation Goldflake, moved by truck, train, and naval transport to Belgium via Livorno and Marseille. After arriving on the Western Front, it disbanded the 12th Brigade, and re-equipped to join the First Canadian Army in time to participate in the final advance into Germany.

In April 1945, the Irish Regiment of Canada was assigned to Operation Cleanser in the Netherlands. They had to liberate the route from Arnhem to Harderwijk. This unexpectedly resulted in a fierce fight at the Battle of Otterlo.

=== General officers commanding ===
General officer commanding	Dates
Major-General Ernest William Sansom	Jun 1941 to Jan 1943
Major-General Charles Ramsay Stirling Stein	Jan 1943 to Oct 1943
Major-General Guy Simonds	Oct 1943 to Jan 1944
Major-General E. L. M. Burns	Jan 1944 to Mar 1944
Major-General Bert Hoffmeister	Mar 1944 to Jun 1945

=== Organization until July 1944 and after March 1945 ===
==== 5th Armoured Brigade ====
- 2nd Armoured Regiment (Lord Strathcona's Horse (Royal Canadians))
- 5th Armoured Regiment (8th Princess Louise's (New Brunswick) Hussars)
- 9th Armoured Regiment (The British Columbia Dragoons)
- 1st Battalion, The Westminster Regiment (Motor)

==== 11th Infantry Brigade ====
- 11th Independent Machine Gun Company (The Princess Louise Fusiliers)
- 1st Battalion, The Perth Regiment
- 1st Battalion, The Cape Breton Highlanders
- 1st Battalion, The Irish Regiment of Canada
- 3rd Armoured Reconnaissance Regiment (The Governor General's Horse Guards)
- 11th Infantry Brigade Ground Defence Platoon (Lorne Scots)

==== Other units ====
- 17th Field Regiment, RCA
- 8th Field Regiment (Self-Propelled), RCA
- 4th Anti-tank Regiment, RCA
- 5th Light Anti-Aircraft Regiment, RCA
- 5th Canadian (Armoured) Division Headquarters Squadron (6th Duke of Connaught's Royal Canadian Hussars), CAC (disbanded 1 January 1943 and absorbed by division headquarters)
- "G" Squadron, 25th Armoured Delivery Regiment (The Elgin Regiment)
- 5th Canadian Armoured Division Engineers
  - 1st Field Squadron, RCE
  - 10th Field Squadron, RCE
  - 4th Field Park Squadron, RCE
  - 5th Canadian Armoured Division Bridge Troop, RCE
- 5th Canadian Armoured Divisional Signals, RCSigs
- No. 5 Provost Company, Canadian Provost Corps

=== Organization July 1944 until March 1945 ===
==== 5th Canadian Armoured Brigade ====
- 2nd Armoured Regiment (Lord Strathcona's Horse (Royal Canadians))
- 5th Armoured Regiment (8th Princess Louise's (New Brunswick) Hussars)
- 9th Armoured Regiment (The British Columbia Dragoons)

==== 11th Canadian Infantry Brigade ====
- 11th Independent Machine Gun Company (The Princess Louise Fusiliers)
- 1st Battalion, The Perth Regiment
- 1st Battalion, The Cape Breton Highlanders
- 1st Battalion, The Irish Regiment of Canada
- 11th Infantry Brigade Ground Defence Platoon (Lorne Scots)

==== 12th Canadian Infantry Brigade (raised in August 1944) ====
- 12th Independent Machine Gun Company (The Princess Louise Fusiliers)
- 1st Battalion, The Westminster Regiment (Motor)
- 4th Princess Louise Dragoon Guards (from 1st Canadian Infantry Division)
- The Lanark and Renfrew Scottish Regiment (from Corps anti-aircraft assets)
- 3rd Armoured Reconnaissance Regiment (The Governor General's Horse Guards)
- 12th Infantry Brigade Ground Defence Platoon (Lorne Scots)

==== Other units ====
- 17th Field Artillery Regiment
- 8th Field Artillery Regiment (Self-Propelled)
- 4th Anti-tank Regiment
- 5th Light Anti-Aircraft Regiment
- "G" Squadron, 25th Armoured Delivery Regiment (The Elgin Regiment), Royal Canadian Armoured Corps
- 5th Canadian Armoured Division Engineers
  - 1st Field Squadron, RCE
  - 10th Field Squadron, RCE
  - 4th Field Park Squadron, RCE
  - 5th Canadian Armoured Division Bridge Troop, RCE
- 5th Canadian Armoured Divisional Signals, RCSigs
- No. 5 Provost Company, Canadian Provost Corps

== Post war ==
=== Eastern Command ===
In 1946, the Canadian Army was divided into five regional total-force commands that were responsible for all Active Force and Reserve Force within assigned regions. The Canadian Army’s Eastern Command was headquartered in Halifax with responsibility for all Atlantic provinces, which later included Newfoundland when it joined confederation in 1949. Eastern Command was also mandated to generate 5th Canadian Division headquarters and division troops in the event of an emergency or other mobilization.

Following Unification of the Canadian Armed Forces in 1968, the Army Reserve was reorganized into militia districts and total force regional commands no longer existed.

=== Land Force Atlantic Area (1991–2013) ===
Land Force Atlantic Area
- Active: 1991–2013
- Country: Canada
- Branch: Canadian Army
- Role: responsible for Canadian Army operations in the Canadian provinces of New Brunswick, Newfoundland and Labrador, Nova Scotia, and Prince Edward Island.
- Headquarters: Canadian Forces Base Halifax

Land Force Atlantic Area (LFAA) was created on 1 September 1991, taking command of what was previously the militia areas and the Regular Force Army units and formations in Atlantic Canada. At that point in time, the Militia Areas ceased to exist, and the subordinate Militia Districts were reorganised. On 4 September 1992, the Combat Training Centre was allocated to LFAA.

Later that decade, the reserve force districts were again reorganized into two Canadian Brigade Groups. LFAA was the formation responsible for Canadian Army operations in the Canadian provinces of New Brunswick, Newfoundland and Labrador, Nova Scotia, and Prince Edward Island and was headquartered at Canadian Forces Base Halifax.

=== Organization of LFAA (2010) ===
Regular Force

- 2nd Battalion, The Royal Canadian Regiment : Oromocto (transferred to command of 2 CMBG in 2012)
- 4 Air Defence Regiment, RCA : Oromocto, New Brunswick (Transformed into 4th Artillery Regiment (General Support), RCA in 2013)
- 4 Engineer Support Regiment : Oromocto
- 3 Military Police Unit : Halifax, Nova Scotia
- LFAA Training Centre : Oromocto
- 3 Area Support Group
  - Canadian Forces Base Gagetown : Oromocto, New Brunswick
  - 3 ASG Detachment Moncton : Moncton, New Brunswick
  - 3 ASG Detachment Charlottetown : Charlottetown, Prince Edward Island

Reserve Force

- 36 Canadian Brigade Group
- 37 Canadian Brigade Group
- 5th Canadian Ranger Patrol Group: Gander, Newfoundland
- 3 Intelligence Company: Halifax, Nova Scotia

=== 5th Canadian Division (2013–2026) ===
In 2013, LFAA was re-designated the 5th Canadian Division and inherited the wartime heritage of the formation. The division continued to be headquartered at CFB Halifax and commanded most Canadian Army units in the Atlantic provinces. The division again formally stood-down on 27 June 2026.

=== Organization at January 2026 ===
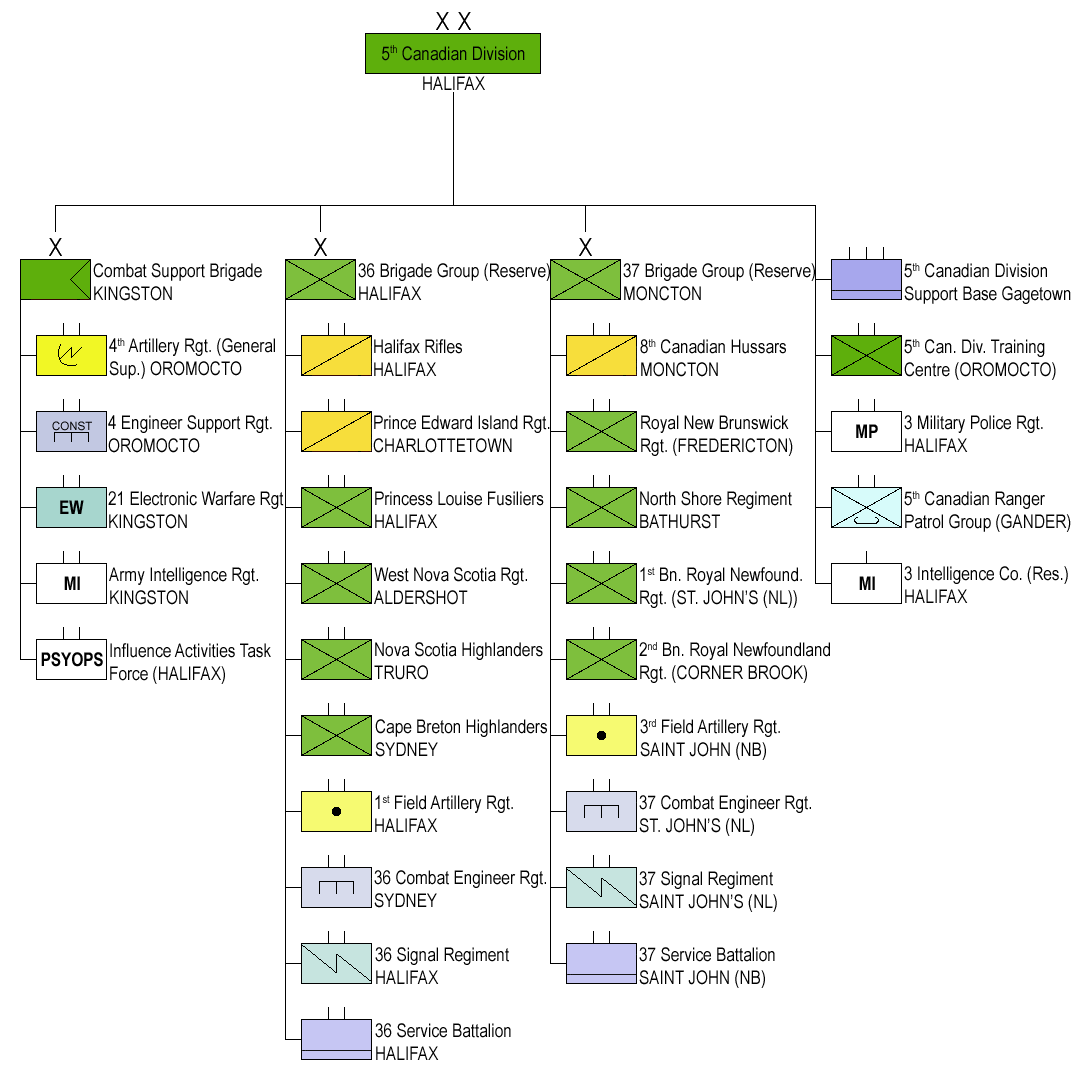
5th Canadian Division organization in 2020

5th Canadian Division Headquarters, at CFB Halifax

6th Canadian Combat Support Brigade

Headquarters, 6th Canadian Combat Support Brigade, at CFB Kingston

4th Artillery Regiment (General Support), RCA, at CFB Gagetown

4 Engineer Support Regiment, Royal Canadian Engineers, at CFB Gagetown

21 Electronic Warfare Regiment, Royal Canadian Signals, at CFB Kingston

Canadian Army Intelligence Regiment HQ, at Kingston

Influence Activities Task Force, at Kingston

36 Canadian Brigade Group

Headquarters, 36 Canadian Brigade Group, at Royal Artillery Park, Halifax

The Halifax Rifles (RCAC), at Halifax Armoury, Halifax

The Prince Edward Island Regiment (RCAC), at Queen Charlotte Armory, Charlottetown

The Princess Louise Fusiliers, at Halifax Armoury, Halifax

The West Nova Scotia Regiment, at 5 CDSB Detachment Aldershot, Kentville

The Nova Scotia Highlanders (North), at Truro Armoury, Truro

The Cape Breton Highlanders, at Victoria Park Armoury, Sydney

1st (Halifax-Dartmouth) Field Artillery Regiment, Royal Canadian Artillery, at Bayers Lake Armoury, Halifax

84th Independent Field Battery, Royal Canadian Artillery, at Yarmouth Armoury, Yarmouth

36 Combat Engineer Regiment, Royal Canadian Engineers, at CFB Shearwater

36 Signal Regiment, Royal Canadian Signals, at Willow Park armoury, Halifax

36 Service Battalion, at Willow Park armoury, Halifax

37 Canadian Brigade Group

Headquarters, 37 Canadian Brigade Group, at 5 CDSB Detachment Moncton

8th Canadian Hussars (Princess Louise's), at 5 CDSB Detachment Moncton

The Royal New Brunswick Regiment (Carleton & York), at Carlton Street Armoury, Fredericton

The North Shore (New Brunswick) Regiment, at Colonel CCL Gammon Armoury, Bathurst

1st Battalion, The Royal Newfoundland Regiment, at CFS St. John's

2nd Battalion, The Royal Newfoundland Regiment, at Gallipoli Armoury, Corner Brook

3rd Field Artillery Regiment (The Loyal Company), Royal Canadian Artillery, at The Barrack Green Armoury, Saint John

37 Combat Engineer Regiment, Royal Canadian Engineers, at CFS St. John's

37 Signal Regiment, Royal Canadian Signals, at CFS St. John's

37 Service Battalion, at CFS St. John's

5th Canadian Division Support Group

Headquarters, 5 CDSG

5 Corporate Services

5 Signals Squadron

5th Canadian Division Support Base Gagetown

5 Operations Support Services

5 Technical Services

5 Personnel Support Services

Camp Aldershot

Garrison Saint John's

Detachment Cape Breton

5th Canadian Division Training Centre, at CFB Gagetown

5th Canadian Ranger Patrol Group, at CFB Gander

3 Intelligence Company (Reserve), in Halifax

=== Lodger units at 5 CDSB Gagetown (January 2026) ===
Combat Training Centre

- Combat Training Center Headquarters
- Royal Canadian Armoured Corps School
- Royal Canadian Artillery School
- Royal Canadian Infantry Corps School
- Canadian Forces School of Military Engineering
- Tactics School
- Canadian Army Trials and Evaluations Unit

2 Canadian Mechanized Brigade Group

- 2nd Battalion, The Royal Canadian Regiment
- C Squadron, Royal Canadian Dragoons

6 Canadian Combat Support Brigade

- 4 Engineer Support Regiment
- 4th Artillery Regiment (General Support), Royal Canadian Artillery

From other formations

- 5th Canadian Division Training Centre
- 403 Helicopter Operational Training Squadron
- 3 Military Police Regiment Detachment Gagetown
- 42 Health Services Unit
- Joint Meteorological Centre
- Real Property Operations Unit (Atlantic) Detachment Gagetown

== See also ==
- List of military divisions
- List of Canadian divisions in World War II
