= E. L. M. Burns =

Canadian general (1897–1985)

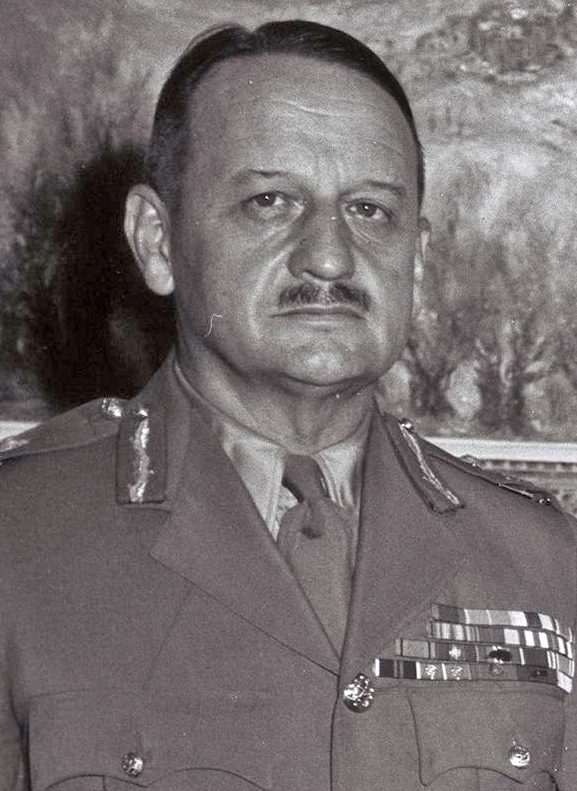
- Burns in 1954
- Born: June 17, 1897; Montreal, Quebec, Canada
- Died: September 13, 1985 (aged 88); Manotick, Ontario
- Burial place: Manotick, Ontario
- Military career
- Allegiance: Canada
- Branch: Canadian Army
- Service years: 1914–1959
- Rank: Lieutenant General
- Nicknames: "Tommy" "Smiling Sunray"
- Units: 17th Duke of York's Royal Canadian Hussars; Royal Canadian Engineers
- Commands: United Nations Emergency Force; United Nations Truce Supervision Organization; I Canadian Corps; 5th Canadian (Armoured) Division; 2nd Canadian Infantry Division; 4th Canadian Armoured Brigade
- Conflicts: World War I World War II
- Awards: Companion of the Order of Canada; Distinguished Service Order; Officer of the Order of the British Empire; Military Cross; Canadian Forces' Decoration; Mentioned in Despatches

Lieutenant General Eedson Louis Millard "Tommy" Burns, CC, DSO, OBE, MC, CD (June 17, 1897 – September 13, 1985) was a senior officer of the Canadian Army and a diplomat. He saw active service in both World War I and World War II. His World War II command during the Italian campaign, although successful, sparked a sharp divide in military academic circles post-war. In the early 1950s, he was the deputy minister for the Veterans Affairs Canada department. He served as the initial commander of the first United Nations peacekeeping force in 1956. In the late 1950s, he became one of Canada's nuclear disarmament negotiators. In the late 1960s and into the 1970s, he taught strategic studies at Carleton University. He wrote several books about his war and peacekeeping experiences. Burns was honoured with several awards including the Order of Canada in 1967 and the Pearson Medal of Peace in 1981.

== Early life and military career ==
E. L. M. Burns was born on June 17, 1897, in Montreal, Quebec. His father was a militia staff officer, a member of the Corps of Guides. He served with the 17th Duke of York's Royal Canadian Hussars (17th D.Y.R.C.H.). He had risen to the rank of signal sergeant by 1913. "Tommy" Burns, student # 1032 graduated from the Royal Military College of Canada in Kingston, Ontario, in 1914. He joined the Royal Canadian Engineers, into which he was commissioned as a second lieutenant in June 1915.

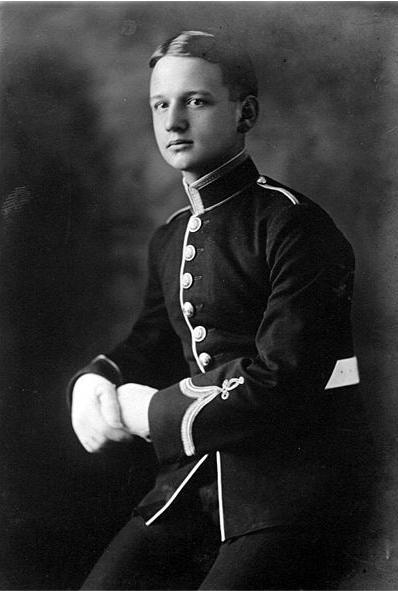
E. L. M. Burns, pictured here as a cadet at the Royal Military College of Canada

Burns served in Canada until March 1916 when he went overseas with the 3rd Canadian Division Signal Company, which was composed of engineers. He fought on the Western Front with the Royal Canadian Engineers from 1916 to 1918. He became a staff officer with the 3rd Division's 9th Brigade in March 1917, dealing with supply and personnel and saw action at the Battle of Vimy Ridge. He became a "staff learner" and acted as liaison officer between forward battalions and brigade headquarters. He returned to Canada in 1919 and was stationed at St. John as an engineer officer. He was wounded twice during the war and also received the Military Cross. The citation for the medal reads:

For conspicuous gallantry in action. In addition to organising and running the signal lines, he personally laid and repaired armoured cables under very heavy fire. He displayed great courage and coolness throughout.

== Between the wars ==
After receiving a commission in the Permanent Force as a captain on 1 April 1920, Burns attended the School of Military Engineering, Chatham, England, for eighteen months. He was an instructor at the Royal Military College of Canada in Kingston, Ontario. He returned to Halifax and served on duty during the miners' strike at Glace Bay. He worked in the Survey Department in Ottawa. In 1924, he was appointed as an instructor at RMC in field engineering. He attended the Staff College, Quetta, in British India and returned to Quebec, Canada, in 1930. In 1939, as a lieutenant colonel, he attended the Imperial Defence College in London, England.

== World War II ==
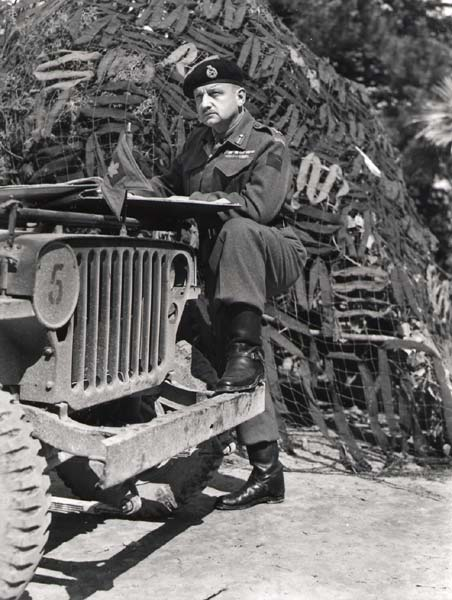
Lieutenant-General E.L.M. Burns at I Canadian Corps HQ in Larino, Italy, 18 March 1944

=== Promotions 1942–1943 ===
During World War II Burns, promoted on 1 February 1942 to the temporary rank of brigadier, assumed command of the 4th Canadian Armoured Brigade, part of the 4th Canadian (Armoured) Division, which eventually went to England. Precisely fifteen months after his promotion to brigadier, he received another promotion, this time to major general, on 1 May 1943, when he became the new General Officer Commanding (GOC) of the 2nd Canadian Infantry Division. The division had been severely mauled the year before during the disastrous Dieppe Raid.

He was not destined to lead the division into battle, however, as, throughout January 1944, there were several changes in the higher levels in command in preparation for the Allied invasion of Normandy in the spring. Lieutenant-General Ernest William Sansom, commanding II Canadian Corps, and under whose command Burns's 2nd Division was serving, was returned to Canada and replaced by Major-General Guy Simonds, returning to England from the Italian front where he had been GOC of the 5th Canadian (Armoured) Division. Burns himself handed over command of the 2nd Division to Charles Foulkes while Burns proceeded to Italy where he succeeded Simonds in command of the 5th Canadian (Armoured) Division on 23 January 1944. Not long after his arrival his superior, Lieutenant-General Harry Crerar, the commander of I Canadian Corps and who was soon to return to England to take over the First Canadian Army, had a high opinion of Burns and, believing him to be corps commander material, wanted Burns to succeed him as GOC I Canadian Corps.

=== GOC I Canadian Corps 1944 ===
That was all in the future, however. By the time of Burns's assumption of command, the division had been in Italy for just ten weeks. On 17 January the division's 11th Infantry Brigade, commanded by Brigadier George Kitching, had launched a disastrous assault over the Arieli River, which failed with heavy casualties. This aside, the division still possessed more battle experience than its new GOC, who, in this war, had never commanded even a company in battle, let alone an entire division. He therefore found himself in the same position that every Canadian divisional commander, the exceptions being Major-General John Hamilton Roberts, who had commanded the 2nd Division at Dieppe, Simonds, who before being GOC of the 5th Division had commanded the 1st Canadian Infantry Division in Sicily, along with Christopher Vokes, who succeeded Simonds in command of the 1st Division. Even Burns's superior, Crerar, had not had the chance to command the two divisions (the 1st and 5th) serving in his corps. The lack of battle experience mattered to the men who had successfully commanded units in battle before (such as at the recent Battle of Ortona, where Vokes's 1st Division had driven out German paratroopers, albeit at a heavy cost) and they were frustrated at an as-yet untested commander being given command of a newly arrived division. General Sir Bernard Montgomery, the former commander of the British Eighth Army (under whose control I Canadian Corps fell), placed experience in battle very highly, as did his successor in command of the Eighth Army, Lieutenant-General Sir Oliver Leese, a man with whom Burns was to clash on several occasions over the following months.

As a result of this, Burns had a lot to prove, and he had to prove it quickly, in the eyes of both his superiors and subordinates alike. Leese, initially at least, liked what he saw of "Tommy" Burns, writing home to his wife in early March, "I think he will be good. I will be glad to get rid of Harry [Crerar] and get Burns installed & to get down to some degree of permanency." Lieutenant Colonel W. C. Murphy, the 5th Division's GSO1, also hoped for a permanent commander who would stay longer than a few weeks. He wrote to his family in early February, "General Burns has joined us. He is very nice to work with and all goes well from that angle. No doubt I'll find a general that I consider good enough to keep on the job one of these days. I hope we'll settle down with no more changes for a while because things always have to be adjusted a bit with each boss man's viewpoint."

Despite Murphy's wishes, change did arrive, as in late March, after receiving a promotion, this time to the acting rank of lieutenant-general on 20 March, Burns became GOC I Canadian Corps, taking over from Crerar, who was returning to England to take over command of the First Canadian Army. Crerar, who continued to think highly of Burns, wrote to Lieutenant-General Kenneth Stuart, the acting commander of the First Army in England as well as chief of staff at Canadian Military Headquarters (CMHQ), that, "Burns is showing up very well, indeed, and gives one a feeling of great confidence. Vokes [GOC 1st Division] has certainly reached his ceiling but, providing he is told very clearly what he is to do, and is guided, in his actions, from above, can be regarded as fit for the responsibilities of his appointment." Vokes was a tough officer who had commanded the 1st Division's 2nd Infantry Brigade throughout the fighting in Sicily and briefly in Italy but Montgomery believed that command of a division was his limit, which he probably told Crerar, who might well have been offended by Vokes's womanizing and almost constant cursing. As a result, Burns, to his surprise, found himself promoted to corps commander instead of Vokes.

=== Dismissal as I Canadian Corps GOC ===
Burns's performance as a corps-level commander proved to be controversial, despite the successes of the Canadian forces in the Italian campaign, and so he was replaced as commander of I Canadian Corps by Major-General Charles Foulkes. Much of this had to do with Vokes constantly complaining about Burns to his superiors to have him removed from command. His World War II command during the Italian campaign sparked a sharp divide in military scholar circles with some historians noting he was a very capable field commander, while others, such as Major J.P. Johnston, arguing in the Canadian Military Journal that he was "simply incapable of commanding a higher formation."

Following this major setback to his career, Burns, reverting back to his permanent rank of major-general, was given another chance, and he was sent to Northwestern Europe in December 1944, becoming the Chief of Canadian Section, 1st Echelon, 21st Army Group, a position he held until September 1945, by which time the war, after six long years, had finally come to an end.

== Later life ==
December 16, 1956, IDF Chief of Staff Moshe Dayan and Major-General E. L. M. Burns end their meeting at Lod airport set to discuss further withdrawal of Israeli troops from Sinai

Burns served as Deputy Minister of Veterans Affairs Canada from 1950 to 1954. He served as a President of the UNAC during the 1950s. He played a critical role in the Middle East peace process from 1954 to 1959. He was instrumental in developing UN peacekeeping. As Chief of Staff in 1954, United Nations Truce Supervision Organization (UNTSO) was designed to maintain the General Armistice Agreements until permanent peace could be formulated.

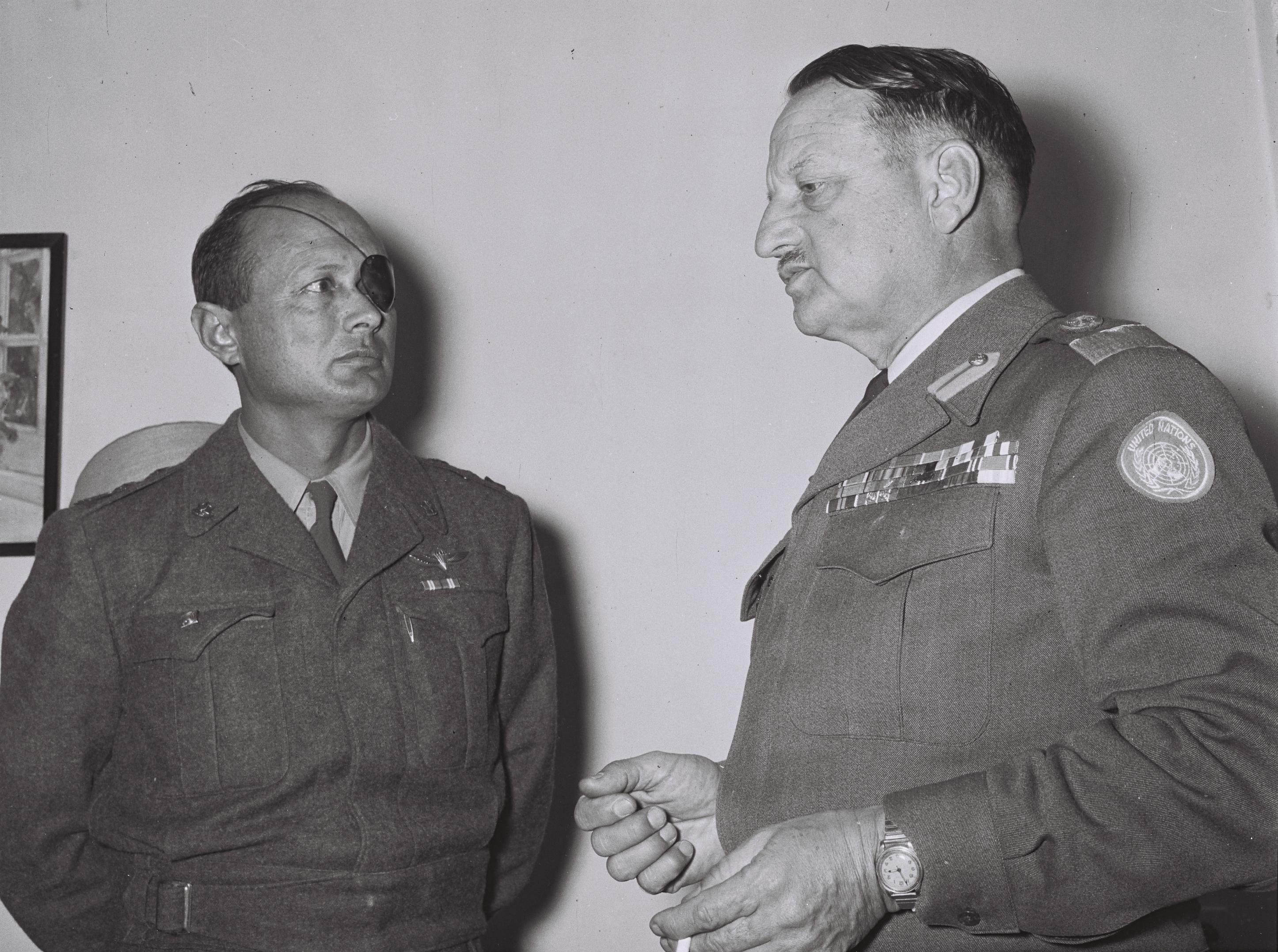
Moshe Dayan with E. L. M. Burns (1957)

Burns served as a Chief of Staff of the Truce Supervision Organization in Palestine (1954–56) and was thus nearby when the Suez Crisis of 1956 occurred. He then led UNEF as Force Commander from November 1956 to December 1959. He was promoted to lieutenant-general.

He was Canada's principal disarmament negotiator from 1960 to 1968.

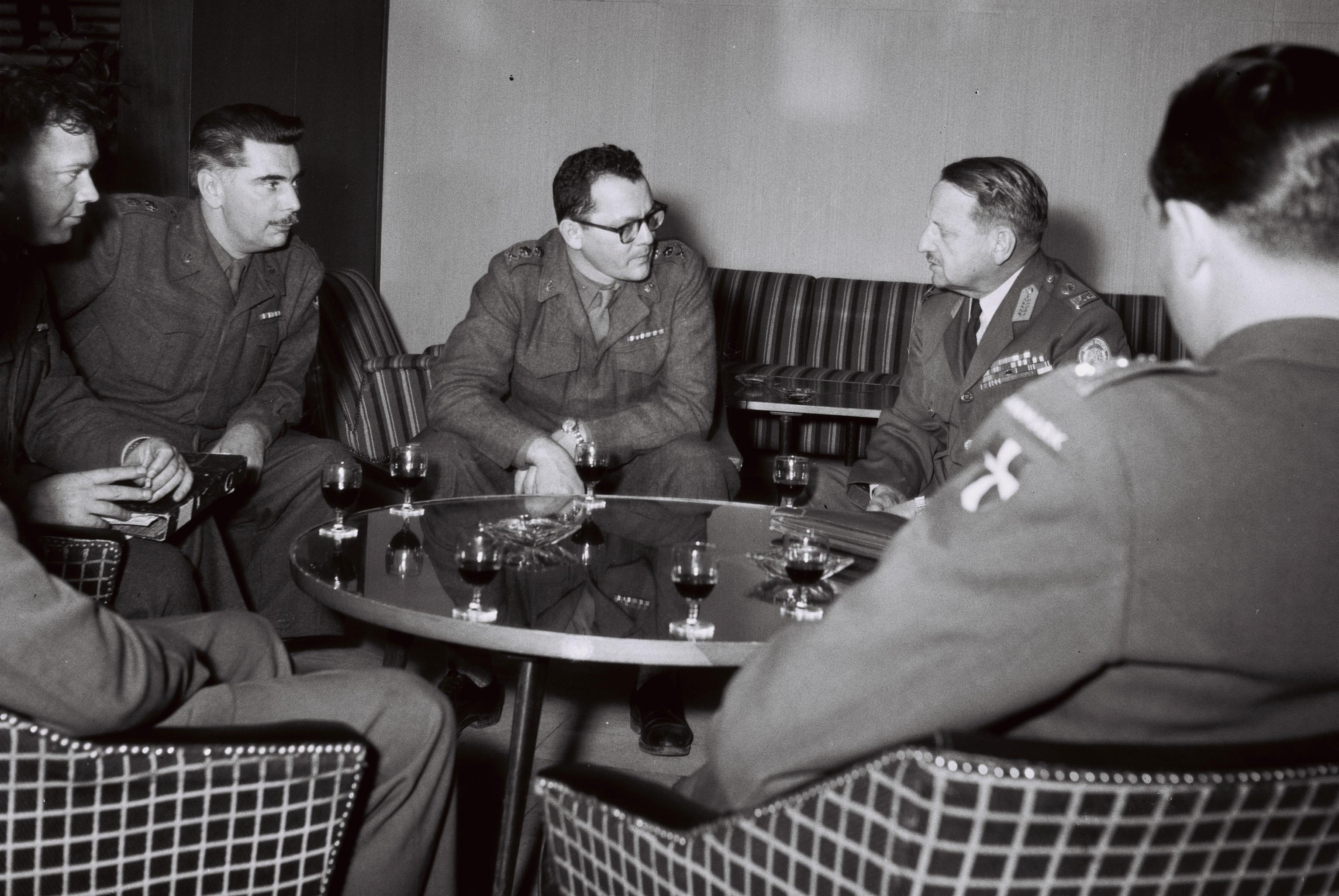
E.L.M. Burns meeting General Haim Laskov in Tel Aviv in 1959

Burns held the chair of Strategic Studies at the Norman Paterson School for International Affairs, Carleton University from 1969 to 1975. He wrote Between Arab and Israeli (1962); General Mud: Memoirs of Two World Wars (1970) and Defense in the Nuclear Age (1976).

He died in Manotick, Ontario at the age of 88 on 13 September 1985. He was given a military ceremonial burial when he was interred in Manotick.

== Honours ==
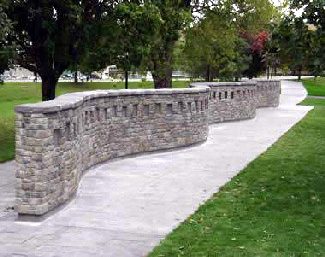
Wall of Honour at the Royal Military College of Canada

Burns was awarded the Military Cross for maintaining communications under heavy fire, and, for the same action at the Somme, his non-commissioned officers received Military Medals.

In 1967 Burns was made a Companion of the Order of Canada for his services to Canada at home and abroad. He was described as a Former Chief of General Staff and Canadian adviser on disarmament in Geneva. In 1970, he received an honorary doctorate from Sir George Williams University, which later became Concordia University.

Burns was the 1981 recipient of the Pearson Medal of Peace for his peacekeeping work and his ongoing work regarding nuclear disarmament. He is a 2010 induction to the Wall of Honour at the Royal Military College of Canada. There is also a park located in Nepean named after him.

A mannequin at the Royal Military College of Canada wears "Tommy" Burns's khaki army uniform jacket, covered with medals and wrapped with a Sam Browne belt.

The largest building at the Canadian Forces College is named Burns Hall, and his portrait is displayed at the entrance of the college.

== Bibliography ==
- Burns, Lieutenant-General E.L.M. (1962) Between Arab and Israeli. George G. Harrap.
- Delaney, Douglas E. (2011). Corps Commanders: Five British and Canadian Generals at War, 1939–45. Vancouver: UBC Press. ISBN 9780774820905.
- Dorn, A. Walter (2021). "Canada and UN Peace Operations: Re-engaging Slowly but Not so Surely". In Murray, Robert W.; Gecelovsky, Paul (eds.). The Palgrave Handbook of Canada in International Affairs. Canada and International Affairs. Cham, Switzerland: Springer International Publishing. pp. 179–194. doi:10.1007/978-3-030-67770-1_9. ISBN 978-3-030-67770-1. S2CID 235865825.
- Granatstein, Jack (2005). The Generals: The Canadian Army's Senior Commanders in the Second World War. University of Calgary Press. ISBN 978-1-55238-176-2.
- Johnston, Major JP. "ELM Burns–A Crisis of Command." (2006). online
- Lofgren, Second Lieutenant Will (21 December 2006). "In Defence of "Tommy" Burns" (PDF). Canadian Military Journal. 7 (4). Kingston, Ontario: National Defence: 92–94. ISSN 1492-465X. Archived (PDF) from the original on 23 May 2013.

Military offices
Preceded by Guy Simonds	GOC 2nd Canadian Infantry Division; 1943–1944	Succeeded by Charles Foulkes
Preceded by Guy Simonds	GOC 5th Canadian (Armoured) Division; January–March 1944	Succeeded by Christopher Vokes
Preceded by Harry Crerar	GOC I Canadian Corps; March–November 1944	Succeeded by Charles Foulkes
Preceded by Vagn Bennike	Chief of Staff, United Nations Truce Supervision; 1954–1956	Succeeded by Byron V. Leary
