= 4th Anti-tank Regiment, RCA =

4th Anti-Tank Regiment, Royal Canadian Artillery
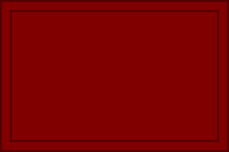
- 5th Canadian Division formation patch
- Active: 1941-1945

The 4th Anti-Tank Regiment, Royal Canadian Artillery was an anti-tank artillery regiment of the Canadian Army that was part of the 5th Canadian Armoured Division during the Second World War. It experienced combat action in the Italian Campaign and the Liberation of the Netherlands.

== Formation (1941) ==
The 4th Anti-Tank Regiment was formed in Petawawa, Ontario in April 1941 from existing batteries. It originally comprised the 24th Anti-Tank Battery from Toronto, Ontario, the 82nd Anti-Tank Battery, from Gaspe, Quebec. the 98th (Bruce) Anti-Tank Battery, from Port Elgin, Ontario, and the 104th Anti-Tank Battery, from Fredericton, New Brunswick. The 104th Battery would eventually be transferred to the to the 7th Anti-Tank Regiment. The Regiment would initially conduct training in Petawawa on 18-pounders with each battery conducting additional training on the QF 2-pounder Anti-Tank gun on a rotational basis due to a limited supply. On 7 October 1941 the 4th Anti-Tank Regiment embarked from Halifax, Nova Scotia for England.

== England (1941-1943) ==
The Regiment anchored in England the 17 October 1941, and headed to Aldershot, where they would stay in the Waterloo East Barracks. While in England the 24th Battery from Toronto would be redesignated the 49th Battery and a new Battery, the 16th Anti-Tank Battery would be formed. In August 1942, the Regiment was repositioned in Brighton, East Sussex, in order to provide support if needed to a second wave of the Dieppe Raid that did not occur. The Regiment would continue to conduct training and exercises across England until they deployed with the rest of the 5th Armoured Division to Italy in November 1943.

== The Italian Campaign (1943-1945) ==
The 4th Anti-Tank Regiment deployed to Italy with the 5th Canadian Armoured Division, joining the I Canadian Corps under the British Eighth Army, the batteries would land in stages starting in 15 November 1943.

A tank of the 12 Royal Canadian Tank Regiment hauls through the mud an anti-tank gun of the 49th Anti-Tank Battery.

The 49th Anti-Tank Battery of the 4th Anti-Tank Regiment would be attached to and the 11th Canadian Infantry Brigade as they were augmented with field, anti-tank, and anti-air artillery assets as they moved to relieve the 3rd Canadian Infantry Brigade on the 1st Canadian Division's front North of Ortona. In this role the 49th Anti-Tank Battery would support the 11th Canadian Infantry Brigade's advance on the Arielli River on 17 January 1944 firing 827 rounds of artillery in total.

Throughout February 1944, the various batteries swapped 17-pounders and 6-pounders within themselves and other Canadian/Commonwealth forces. By the end of the month the 98th "Bruce" and 82nd Batteries were refitted with three troops of self-propelled M10 Anti-Tank guns while the 16th and 49th Batteries would each have two troops of 6-pounders and one troop of 17-pounders.

In the spring of 1944 the 4th Anti-Tank Regiment along with the entirety of I Canadian Corps was relocated from the Adriatic coast to the western side of the Italian peninsula in preparation of the Allied offensive named Operation Diadem in an effort to break the Gustav Line and open up the way to Rome.

On the 17 May 1944, the 98th "Bruce" and 82nd batteries of the 4th Anti-Tank Regiment began repositioning towards the Cassino front. The 98th "Bruce" Battery was attached to the British Columbia Dragoons battle group commanded by Lieutenant-Colonel F.A. Vokes (brother of General Vokes). The 82nd Battery was attached to the Lord Strathcona's Horse battle group commanded by Lieutenant-Colonel P.G. Griffin. The advance of the battle groups of the 5th Armoured Brigade towards the Melfa River would begin on 23 May. The 82nd and 98th "Bruce" batteries were employed often for "house-busting" clearing the way for the continued advance. During this first day, the 98th "Bruce" Battery knocked out a Panther Mk V tank with two rounds as they moved towards the Melfa. The 98th "Bruce" Battery would continue to have success after taking up hull down positions on the near bank of the Melfa River, engaging houses and strong points on the far side of the river. In total the 98th "Bruce" Battery destroyed the one Panther tank, a towed German 88mm, two self-propelled guns, and one 7.5cm gun, well also capturing one 7.5cm self-propelled gun. The battery also suffered the loss of one of their M-10s during the operation.
