= Military Police Regiment =

Military Police Regiment may refer to:

- Provost (military police) regiments
- Canadian Forces Military Police regiments:
  - 1 Military Police Unit (Canada), or "1 Military Police Regiment"
  - 2 Military Police Unit (Canada), or "2 Military Police Regiment"
  - 3 Military Police Unit (Canada), or "3 Military Police Regiment"
  - 5 Military Police Unit (Canada), or "5 Military Police Regiment"
- Canadian Provost Corps was divided into several regiments of military police
- Kempeitai, the Imperial Japanese secret police
- Republic of China Military Police are organized into several regiments
- Military Police (Brazil)'s mounted unit is organized into several regiments
- Royal Military Police is divided into several regiments
- Sri Lanka Corps of Military Police is divided into several regiments
- The United States Army's Military Police Corps is considered a single regiment under USARS
