= Operation Chesterfield =

Canadian attack plan

- Part of Italian campaign in the European theatre of World War II
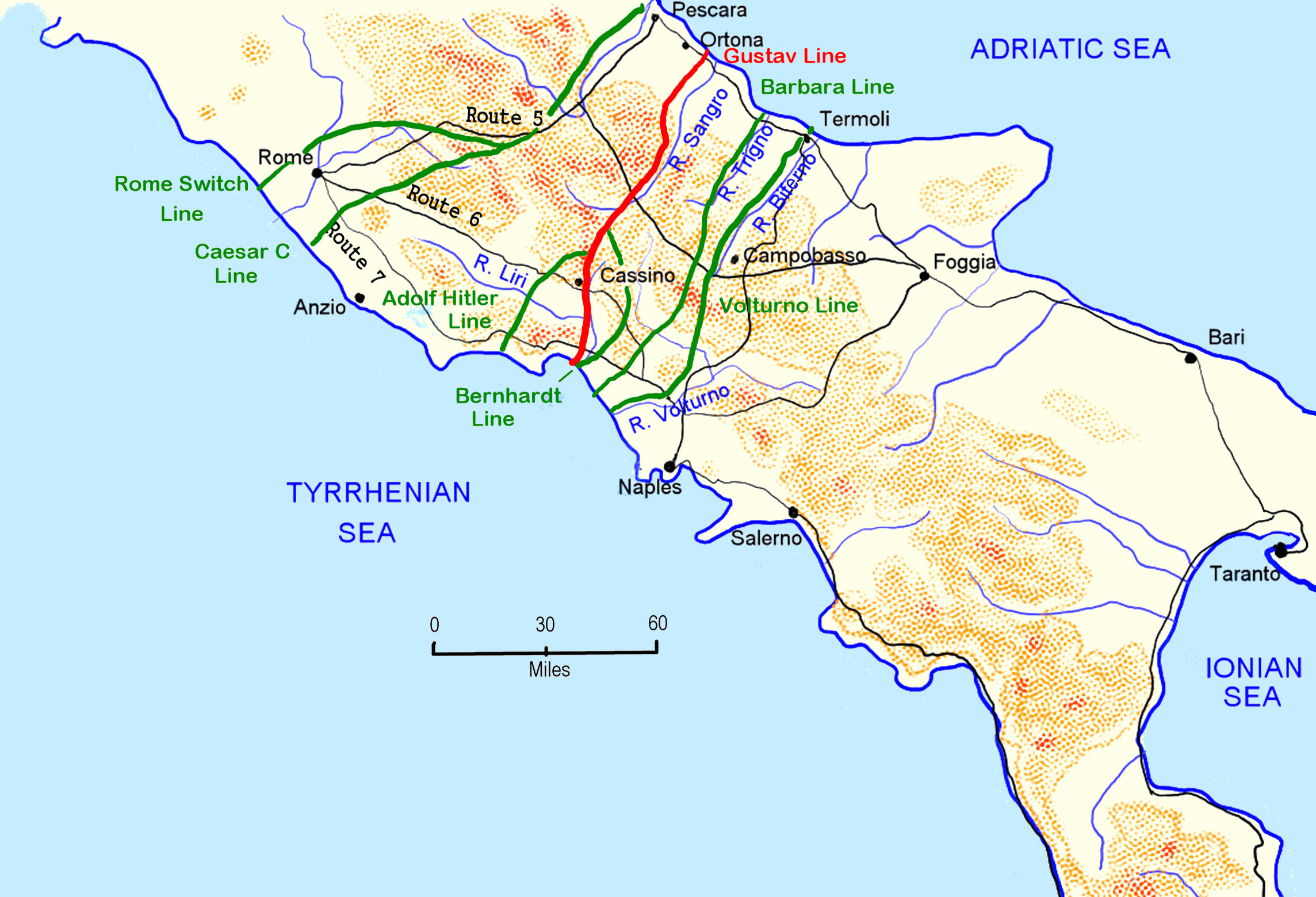
- The Hitler Line
Date	May 24th – 25th 1944
Location	South of Rome, Italy
Result	Allied victory

Belligerents
Canada; Poland	Germany

Commanders and leaders
(Canada) Christopher Vokes (Canada) Bert Hoffmeister (Polish government-in-exile) Władysław Anders	(Nazi Germany) Albert Kesselring

Strength
1st Canadian Division; 5th Canadian Armoured Division; II Polish Corps	90th Light Infantry Division

Casualties and losses
879 casualties 12 tanks	Unknown killed 700 taken prisoner

Operation Chesterfield was the assault by Canadian and Polish forces on the Hitler Line, on May 23-24 1944 during World War II. The Hitler Line was a German fortified defensive line south of Rome.

Initial attempts to penetrate the defenses before they had been effectively manned had failed and a set piece, prepared assault became necessary. The action was hard-fought and the Germans launched repeated counterattacks over the two days, attempting to retake their former positions. Ultimately, Allied forces of the 1st Canadian Division, 5th Canadian Armoured Division and II Polish Corps penetrated the Hitler line and the German defenders had to retreat, in some disorder. A corresponding same-day American breakout at the Anzio beachhead further weakened the German situation in Italy.
