= CFB Moncton =

Former Canadian Forces Base in New Brunswick

Coordinates: 46°05′29″N 64°47′48″W

Canadian Forces Base Moncton or CFB Moncton is a former Canadian Forces Base located in Moncton, New Brunswick.

The centrally located city of Moncton was selected in 1940 for the site of a logistics supply base for military facilities in the Maritimes that were undergoing unprecedented expansion as a result of World War II. Moncton Garrison was constructed in an industrial area on a railway spur line north of downtown, immediately east of the sprawling Canadian National Railways Moncton Shops facility.

The Moncton Garrison survived into the Cold War and was renamed Canadian Forces Base Moncton (CFB Moncton) in February 1968 following the unification of the Canadian Army, Royal Canadian Navy and Royal Canadian Air Force to create the Canadian Forces.

Under the Canadian Forces, CFB Moncton was initially attached to Materiel Command however this command was closed in June 1968 and the base was attached to Maritime Command.

Defence budget cuts in the 1990s following the end of the Cold War saw CFB Moncton identified for closure as a formation. It stood down on April 1, 1996, and at that time was replaced by Canadian Forces Base Gagetown - Detachment Moncton, also known as Moncton Garrison, a unit of CFB Gagetown.

CFB Gagetown - Detachment Moncton supports the following units stationed at the garrison:

- Sub-unit of The North Shore (New Brunswick) Regiment
- Headquarters and A Squadron 8th Canadian Hussars (Princess Louise's)
- Headquarters 37 Canadian Brigade Group
- 303 Military Police Platoon (3 Military Police Regiment (Canada))
- HMCS Brunswicker Moncton Satellite (Canadian Forces Naval Reserve)

== Closure ==
In April 2012, the Department of National Defence announced that Moncton Garrison would be closed in the near future.
