= Royal Canadian Air Force Police =

Military police

The Royal Canadian Air Force Police was responsible for military police functions for the Royal Canadian Air Force (RCAF).

== History ==
In 1940 the RCAF set up the Guards and Discipline Branch, which later changed its name to the Directorate of Provost and Security Services (DPSS). The DPSS provided police mainly for guard, security, and disciplinary duties. During the Second World War and into the post-war period, the RCAF Police were known as the RCAF Service Police (RCAF SP) and police personnel were referred to as "SPs".

After the war when the air force expanded to meet NATO commitments, the RCAF Service Police also expanded to meet the responsibilities of policing the larger and increasing number air force stations in Canada and Europe. The RCAF Service Police was formally renamed the Air Force Police (AFP) in 1955, although it was still often referred to as the "Service Police".

Following amalgamation of the three services into the Canadian Forces in 1968, the AFP was merged with the police units of the Royal Canadian Navy and Canadian Army to become simply the Military Police; under the Canadian Armed Forces Security and Intelligence Branch.

== See also ==
- Canadian Forces Military Police
- Canadian Provost Corps
