= 3rd Field Artillery Regiment, RCA =

3rd Field Artillery Regiment (The Loyal Company), RCA
- Active: 4 May 1793 - present
- Country: Canada
- Branch: Canadian Army
- Type: Field Artillery
- Size: One Regiment
- Part of: Royal Regiment of Canadian Artillery
- Garrison/HQ: Saint John, New Brunswick
- Nickname: The Loyal Company
- Mottos: Ubique. Quo fas et gloria ducunt. (Everywhere. Whither right and glory lead)
- March: Royal Artillery Slow March

The 3rd Field Artillery Regiment, RCA (French: 3e Régiment d'artillerie) is a Canadian Army Reserve artillery regiment based in Saint John, New Brunswick. It is part of the 5th Canadian Division's 37 Canadian Brigade Group.

The Loyal Company of Artillery of the City of Saint John was formed on May 4, 1793 after New Brunswick passed its first Militia Act in 1792 in response to the outbreak of the French Revolutionary Wars. Since that historic founding The Loyal Company of Artillery formed the core of a body of militia artillery that has existed in the province right up to the present day in the form of 3rd Field Artillery Regiment, Royal Canadian Artillery. For much of the 20th century the Regiment proudly carried "The Loyal Company" designation as part of its title, perpetuating the connection to Canada's oldest artillery unit. The Loyal Company was the first of several militia artillery companies, renamed batteries in the later nineteenth century, formed in for the defence of the colony's main port and border towns from outside threat.

== History ==
=== War of 1812 ===
The threat of war with the United States proved real enough in 1812 that New Brunswick militia artillery detachments were activated as part of the 1st and 2nd Battalions to man newly built shore batteries in overlooking the Passamaquoddy Bay and the coast of disputed territory in what is now the State of Maine. Throughout the War of 1812 other detachments of militia artillerymen built and manned defences alongside British regular gunners.

=== The New Brunswick Regiment of Artillery ===
Saint John's importance as the key all-season port of entry into British North America then meant that the city garrison was always armed and provisioned for defense from the sea. Artillery was central to that defense, making the garrison a logical focal point for the training and equipping of militia artillery from across the province. In 1838 militia artillery companies throughout the province were unified as the New Brunswick Regiment of Artillery. The core and headquarters of this force was the original Loyal Company and the gun batteries defending the harbour. Indeed, the NB Regiment of Artillery was formed to man those vital defenses when the British regular artillery garrison marched west in response to the Rebellions of 1837 and 1838 in Upper Canada. That same year, the Regiment was called on to dispatch a troop of artillery to during the border dispute known as the War of 1838-39. Despite funding shortages, the Regiment continued to maintain a high standard of readiness and artillery skill-at-arms largely due to a continuation of the same volunteer spirit that inspired the Loyal Company of Artillery. That readiness was apparent in 1866 during the Fenian Raids when the Regiment manned the gun batteries around and along the border. A decade later, they once again stood guard at the nation's coastal defenses during the 1878 war scare. They also came to the aid of the civil powers during the Saint John Great Fire of 1877 using their specialist skills in handling high explosives to blow down walls for a fire break. These dramatic highlights as well as more routine mustering for summer training camps and ceremonial occasions established the Regiment of Artillery as a proud and well-known element of the defence forces. The province of New Brunswick and the City of Saint John recognized the many contributions of this regiment when it celebrated the founding of the Loyal Company with a grand centennial ball in May 1893.

=== 20th Century ===
In 1895, as part of a wave of Canadian defense modernization and national organization, the unit was first identified with its modern numerical designation and named the 3rd (New Brunswick) Regiment of Canadian Garrison Artillery. It counted among its members Lieutenant-Colonel C.W. Drury, considered to be the father of Canada's modern artillery. Drury commanded The Canadian Brigade of Artillery during the South African War, which included a troop of gunners from the Regiment's 89th Battery in Woodstock. LCol Drury was himself the grandson of LCol Richard Hayne, the Regiment's first commanding officer at the time of formation in 1838. So began the new 20th century reputation for excellence not only for manning defenses at home but also for raising well-trained artillerymen for overseas service.

=== The Great War, 1914-1918 ===
The day after war broke out in August 1914 the Regiment barged its 4.7inch heavy guns to protect the mouth of the Saint John harbour . For the duration of the war, the Regiment stood on guard against the threat of German cruisers and submarines on Canada's east coast. The unit's heavy guns and experienced artillerymen also served to train thousands of volunteers from New Brunswick and eastern Canada for service in the Canadian Corps Heavy Artillery formed in 1916. The Regiment also contributed personnel to the 2nd Divisional Ammunition Column and the 1st Canadian Heavy Battery, among them future commanding officers LCol "Harry" Harrison and Major Cyrus Inches.

In 1916 volunteers from the Regiment travelled overseas as 4th and 6th Canadian Siege Batteries, firing their first shots in anger during the Battle of the Somme. There they perfected new techniques of long range counter-battery bombardment. The Canadian Corps Heavy Artillery, including 4th and 6th Siege Batteries gathered together for the first time with the whole of the Canadian Corps in the spring of 1917. That April they fired what has gone down in history as one of the most successful counter-battery bombardments in history, neutralizing over 80 percent of the German artillery and paving the way for Canadian infantrymen to take Vimy Ridge. From Vimy, 4th and 6th Canadian Siege Batteries were joined in 1918 by 3rd Brigade, Canadian Garrison Artillery, made up mostly of New Brunswick and Maritime gunners trained in Saint John. The Regiment became the core of the Canadian Corps Heavy Artillery during the Great War. New Brunswick heavy gunners supported the Corps in the difficult fighting for the final 100 Days Campaign. Its batteries played an especially important role in the dramatic Canadian victory at the Canal du Nord and Cambrai in September 1918. At the end of the Great War, surviving veterans came home to what became known as 3rd (New Brunswick) Coast Brigade, Royal Canadian Artillery (The Loyal Company of Artillery). Many veterans stayed active in the interwar militia, keeping alive the Reserve long range artillery.

=== The Second World War, 1939-1945 ===
In 1939 3rd (New Brunswick) Coast Brigade, RCA, (The Loyal Company of Artillery) mobilized to prepare and man new heavy coastal gun batteries constructed around Saint John. The threat of German surface raiders and submarines was even greater in the Second World War than in the first, requiring much of the Regiment's attention. However, the requirements for trained artillerymen for overseas service led to the despatch of four batteries from the regiment. 89th Battery from Woodstock mustered as field artillery while 90th and 104th Batteries from Fredericton assembled as anti-tank units. All three were despatched to Italy, taking part in the Canadian victory at the Hitler Line that opened the liberation of Rome. 105th from Saint John also went overseas as an anti-tank unit, landing in Normandy and taking part in the climactic Battle of the Falaise Gap and The Battle of the Scheldt.

=== 1945-Present ===
The close of the Second World War ended direct threats to Canada's east coast by sea. The new threat to Canadian security in the early Cold War era came from Soviet bombers carrying nuclear weapons. In response the Regiment was re-organized as a medium anti-aircraft unit. The threat of aircraft gave way to ballistic missiles, and the Canadian Army once again organized for forward conventional defence in Europe as a leading member of the Treaty Organization. In that context, in 1962 the Regiment evolved into its present role as the 3rd Field Artillery Regiment (The Loyal Company), Royal Canadian Artillery. Since then the Regiment has continued in its same function since the Loyal Company was formed in 1793; to maintain a reserve force of trained artillerymen to defend at home and abroad. In recent decades, the most visible form of that mission has been to provide gunners and officers to augment regular force Royal Canadian Artillery batteries deployed for overseas service on peace-keeping, peace-enforcement and stability operations. In the last four decades hundreds of 3rd Field Artillery Regiment gunners have served in, Cyprus the Golan Heights, the Former Yugoslavia, Somolia, and most recently, South Sudan. A mission of particular pride was in support of the Canadian Forces's efforts in Afghanistan, where the requirement for Canadian soldiers with artillery and observer skills once again became paramount. The Loyal Company title was officially shorn as the Regiment's post-nominal title on 20 November 1975, apparently as part of the wider policy of separating the unified Canadian Forces from traditions and customs associated with . Nevertheless, the unit continues to perpetuate the link its 1793 foundation. After a loud appeal the Canadian Government restored the Loyal Company to the regiment's official name in 2012.

Members of the regiment fought with the Canadian Task Forces that served in Afghanistan from 2002-2014.

== Perpetuations ==
=== War of 1812 ===
- 1st Battalion, Charlotte County Regiment
- 2nd Battalion, Charlotte County Regiment

=== The Great War ===
- 3rd Brigade, CGA, CEF
- No. 4 Canadian Siege Battery, CEF
- No. 6 Canadian Siege Battery, CEF

== Regimental band ==
The regimental military band was formed in 1948, having performed over the years for personalities such as Queen Elizabeth II, Prince Philip and Diana, Princess of Wales. It consists of 30 members that include high school and university students as well as volunteer musicians.

== See also ==
- Military history of Canada
- History of the Canadian Army

Preceded by 2nd Field Artillery Regiment, RCA	3rd Field Artillery Regiment, RCA	Succeeded by 5th (British Columbia) Field Artillery Regiment, RCA of Royal Canadian Artillery
