= Charles Ramsay Stirling Stein =

Canadian Army officer

- Born: 1897
- Military career
- Allegiance: British Empire
- Branch: Canadian Army Royal Canadian Engineers
- Service years: 1915-1943
- Rank: Major General
- Unit: Royal Canadian Engineers
- Commands: 5th Canadian (Armoured) Division
- Conflicts: World War II

Major General Charles Ramsay Stirling Stein (January 5, 1897 – June 3, 1973) was a Canadian Army officer who commanded the 5th Canadian (Armoured) Division during World War II.

== Education ==
He studied at the Royal Military College of Canada in Kingston, Ontario earning a war certificate in 1915 (College Number 1089).

== Career ==
He served in World War I and remained in the army, attending the British Staff College, Camberley.

He served in the Royal Canadian Engineers. He returned to RMC from 1936-40 as Lieutenant Colonel staff-adjutant. In May 1939, he announced to the RMC on behalf of the Commandant 816 Brigadier K. Stuart that the present class would not be offered commissions until June 1941. This decision was made because the government had decided that an applicant for a Canadian commission had to be at least 20 years old. Ex-cadets were delighted by this policy. The largest recruit class since World War I, one hundred cadets, arrived in Kingston, Ontario in August 1940. He was promoted to Brigadier, General Staff, army headquarters and Major-General Commanding Officer of the 5th Canadian (Armoured) Division from January 1943 to October 1943. He was relieved from duty on medical grounds in 1943.

After the war, Stein led civil defence work in British Columbia.

== Bibliography ==
- Granatstein, Jack (2005). The Generals. University of Calgary Press. ISBN 978-1-55238-176-2.

Military offices
Preceded by Ernest Sansom	GOC 5th Canadian (Armoured) Division; 1943–1944	Succeeded by Guy Simonds
