= 11th Canadian Infantry Brigade =

11th Canadian Brigade 11th Canadian Infantry Brigade
- Active: 1916–1919; 1941–1945
- Country: Canada
- Branch: Canadian Army
- Type: Infantry
- Size: Brigade
- Part of: 4th Canadian Division (WWI); 5th Canadian Armoured Division (WWII)
- Engagements: World War I: Battle of the Ancre Heights; Battle of Vimy Ridge; Battle of Hill 70; Battle of Passchendaele; Battle of Amiens; Battle of the Canal du Nord; World War II: Italian campaign; Hitler Line; Gothic Line; Western Allied invasion of Germany

Commanders
- Notable commanders: George Kitching

The 11th Canadian Infantry Brigade was a brigade-sized infantry formation of the Canadian Army which saw service in both World Wars. During the First World War, the brigade formed part of the 4th Canadian Division where it served on the Western Front as part of the Canadian Corps. During the Second World War, the brigade served this time as part of the 5th Canadian (Armoured) Division of the I Canadian Corps in the Italian Campaign and later in North-West Europe along with the rest of the First Canadian Army.

== Order of Battle ==
=== World War I ===
==== 11th Canadian Brigade ====
- 54th Battalion (Kootenay), CEF. April 1916 – 11 November 1918
- 75th Battalion (Mississauga), CEF. April 1916 – 11 November 1918
- 87th Battalion (Canadian Grenadier Guards), CEF. June 1916 – 11 November 1918 (transferred from the 12th Canadian Brigade)
- 102nd Battalion, CEF. April 1916 – 11 November 1918

=== World War II ===
==== 11th Canadian Infantry Brigade (November 1943 – July 1944, March 1945 – May 1945) ====
- 11th Independent Machine Gun Company (The Princess Louise Fusiliers)
- 1st Battalion, The Perth Regiment
- 1st Battalion, The Cape Breton Highlanders
- 1st Battalion, The Irish Regiment of Canada
- 3rd Armoured Reconnaissance Regiment (The Governor General's Horse Guards)
- 11th Infantry Brigade Ground Defence Platoon (Lorne Scots)

==== 11th Canadian Infantry Brigade (July 1944 – March 1945) ====
- 11th Independent Machine Gun Company (The Princess Louise Fusiliers)
- 1st Battalion, The Perth Regiment
- 1st Battalion, The Cape Breton Highlanders
- 1st Battalion, The Irish Regiment of Canada
- 11th Infantry Brigade Ground Defence Platoon (Lorne Scots)
