= George Kitching =

Canadian military general in WWII

Major-General George Kitching CBE DSO CD
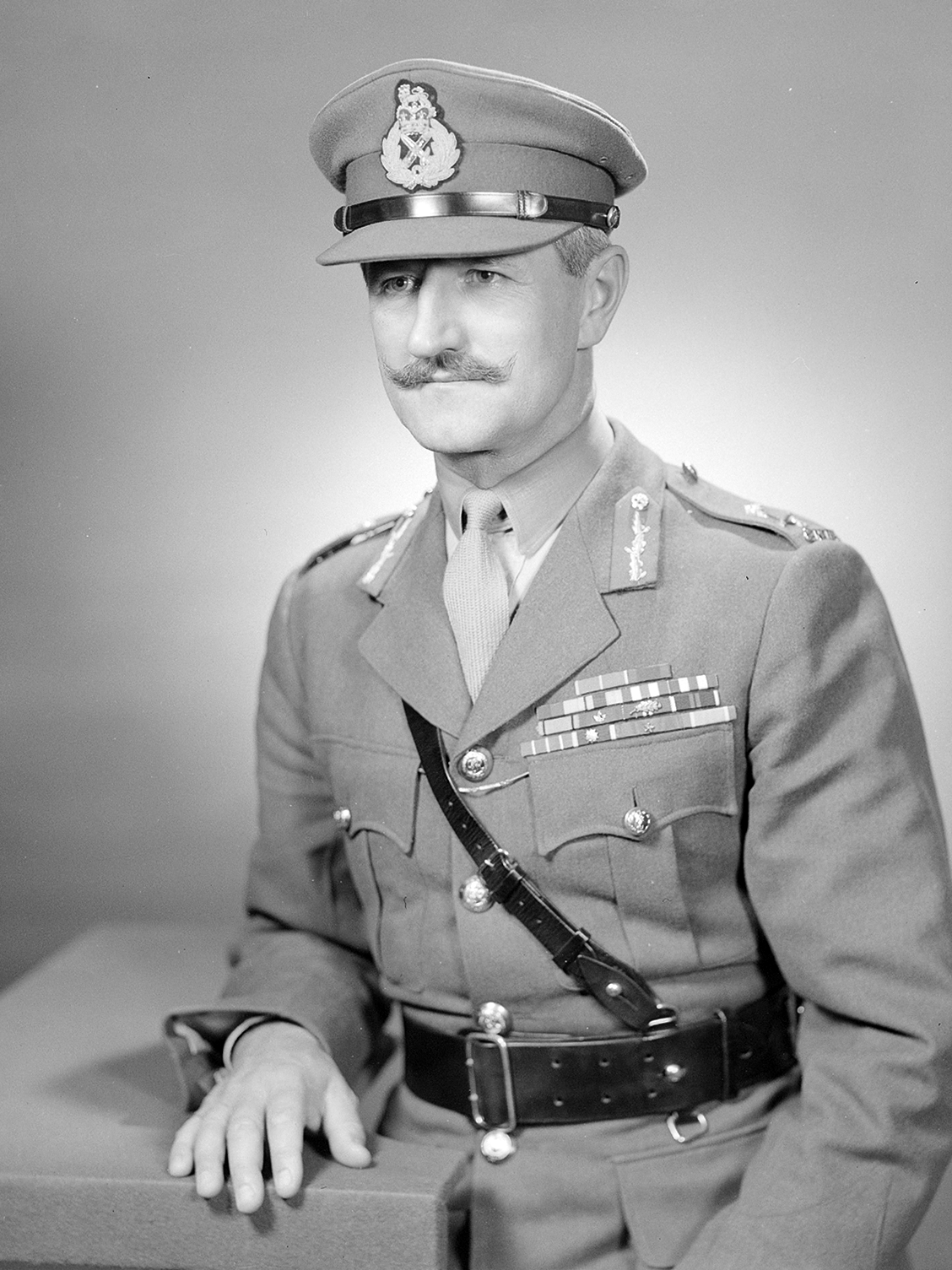
- Kitching in 1956
- Born: 9 September 1910; Guangzhou, China
- Died: 15 June 1999 (aged 88); Victoria, British Columbia, Canada
- Military career
- Allegiance: United Kingdom; Canada
- Branch: British Army; Canadian Army
- Service years: 1929−1938; 1939−1965
- Rank: Major-General
- Units: Gloucestershire Regiment; The Royal Canadian Regiment
- Commands: The Edmonton Regiment; 11th Canadian Infantry Brigade; 4th Canadian (Armoured) Division; 13th Canadian Infantry Brigade
- Conflicts: World War II
- Awards: Commander of the Order of the British Empire; Distinguished Service Order; Military Cross

Major-General George Kitching (9 September 1910 − 15 June 1999) CBE, DSO, CD was a senior Canadian Army officer who saw active service in World War II.

== Life and military career ==
=== Early life ===
George Kitching was born on 9 September 1910 in Guangzhou (Canton), China. He died on 15 June 1999 in Victoria, British Columbia, Canada. He was the guest of Prince Bernhard of Lippe-Biesterfeld a couple of days before when he fell ill. He never recovered.

Kitching received his military training at the Royal Military College, Sandhurst in the United Kingdom, joining the Gloucestershire Regiment. The British Army gave him several postings in Asia, including Singapore, Malaya and India. In 1938 he resigned his commission in order to join the Canadian Army.

In 1939 he joined The Royal Canadian Regiment in the Canadian Army. He was appointed to several positions before attending Staff College, Camberley to become a senior officer. Again he held several positions, mainly at the staff of Headquarters 1st Canadian Division and Headquarters I Canadian Corps, before he got his first command in August 1942. Within a few months he was back at the Headquarters of the 1st Canadian Division for the preparations of the invasions of Sicily and Italy. In November 1943 he was promoted to brigadier to command the 11th Canadian Infantry Brigade, followed by the 4th Canadian Armoured Division.

=== Normandy ===
Kitching brought the division to Normandy where they were involved in the battle around the Falaise Pocket, in the final stages of the Battle of Normandy. According to the historian Angelo Caravaggio, Kitching was then victimized for the poor performance of the division in Normandy. Caravaggio claims that essential contemporary sources were altered after the sacking of Kitching and are therefore unreliable. To him it seemed that Lieutenant-General Guy Simonds, commanding II Canadian Corps, stripped his sub-commanders of authority, did not take the lack of experience into account and expected unrealistic results. Kitching could hardly command his own division due to the constant interference from Simonds. Caravaggio comes to the conclusion that Kitching and his inexperienced division performed very well under the difficult circumstances and confusing orders they had to work in. But the historian Antony Beevor describes Kitching as lethargic and incompetent and mentions a "lack of drive" demonstrated by the 4th Armoured.

The result of the battle was that Kitching was demoted to brigadier and sent off to command a training unit. Charles Foulkes, commander of I Canadian Corps, had more confidence in his abilities and brought him in as Brigadier, General Staff. He was involved in all operations of the I Canadian Corps until the surrender of the German Forces in the Netherlands.

After the war he stayed in the military until 1965. He held in that time positions including Quartermaster General and Director General of Army Personnel. In 1956 he was promoted to major-general for the second time in his career.

=== Senior positions held ===
| From | To | Unit | Role | Rank |
|---|---|---|---|---|
| 01-08-1942 | 13-12-1942 | The Edmonton Regiment (1st Canadian Infantry Division) | Officer Commanding | Lieutenant-Colonel |
| 14-12-1942 | 30-10-1943 | 1st Canadian Infantry Division HQ | General Staff Officer 1 | Lieutenant-Colonel |
| 01-11-1943 | 13-02-1944 | 11th Canadian Infantry Brigade | Officer Commanding | Brigadier |
| 01-03-1944 | 21-08-1944 | 4th Canadian Armoured Division | General Officer Commanding | Major-General |
| 29-08-1944 | 23-10-1944 | 13th Canadian Infantry Brigade | Officer Commanding | Brigadier |
| 12-11-1944 | 01-07-1945 | I Canadian Corps | Brigadier General Staff | Brigadier |

== Post-military career ==
Kitching served as head of the LCBO from 1970 to 1984. Kitching is a former patron and member of the Board of Trustees of Lester B. Pearson College in Victoria.

=== Books ===
- Mud and Green Fields: The Memoirs of Major-General George Kitching (1986)

== Notes ==
Military offices
| Preceded by F. F. Worthington | GOC 4th (Canadian) Armoured Division; March–August 1944 | Succeeded by Harry Foster |
