= 3 Military Police Regiment (Canada) =

- Active: 2006 - Present
- Country: Canada
- Branch: Canadian Forces Military Police
- Type: Regular Force and Reserve Force (total force unit)
- Role: Police and security services to 5th Canadian Division headquarters and units, both in garrison and in operations
- Size: 250
- Part of: 5th Canadian Division
- Garrison/HQ: 255 Damascus Rd, Bedford Commons Plaza, Bedford, NS *
- Motto: Valour through Service
- March: The Thunderbird
- Anniversaries: June 1st (Military Police Branch Birthday)

Commanders
- Current commander: Lieutenant-Commander Nearing
- Regimental Sergeant-Major: Master Warrant Officer Thompson

Insignia
- Abbreviation: 3 MP Regt

3 Military Police Regiment (3MPR) is a unit of the Canadian Army. Like all the CF Army Military Police regiments, while they reside within the Regular Force, the units are actually "total force" units comprising both a regular and reserve component. The Regular component consists of the headquarters and a policing platoon in Arcadia, New Brunswick. The Reserve component consists of a company of three platoons located in Halifax, Nova Scotia and Moncton, New Brunswick.

== Background ==
=== Recent history ===
The Military Police in Halifax trace their roots back to World War I where, in 1917, the Canadian Military Police Corps (CMPC) was stood up and Number 6 Detachment was formed. Their main duty was to maintain discipline, enforce the Conscription Act, and apprehend deserters and draft evaders. The CMPC was stood down in 1920.

The Reserve MP Companies in the Canadian Army Primary Reserve trace their roots back to the Provost Companies formed during WWII although none of the Reserve Companies have their homes in the places that saw the birth of these wartime companies. The existing company in Halifax traces its roots back to Number 5 Provost Company, which was established after the conclusion of World War II. The company was headquartered in Halifax with detachments in Halifax and Moncton. In 1967 the Canadian Forces unified, causing the three service's policing elements to be brought together to form the Security Branch. As a result, the Provost Corps was disbanded and the existing Army Reserve Provost Platoons (Pl) in the Maritimes, which had grown to five, were each placed under the command of the new Service Battalions and titled Military Police Platoons (MP Pls). They were numbered 31, 32, 33, 36, and 37 MP Pls, which matched their Service Battalion numbers.

On 5 October 1997, under Reserve Restructure, Directive 7, and as a result of a number of studies concerning the Reserve MP Pls, they were removed from the Service Battalions and amalgamated into a single independent platoon in Halifax named 30 MP Pl. It was the first independent reserve MP unit in Canada and reported to the Commander of 36 Canadian Brigade Group (CBG). The platoon then moved from Willow Park to 12 Wing Shearwater.

In 2003, under the Army Reserve Establishment, 30 MP Pl became 30 MP Company (Coy) with the addition of a second Pl.

In September 2004, as a result of the second phase of the Land Force Reserve Restructure, Land Force Atlantic Area (LFAA) issued a Master Implementation Plan (MIP) for the stand up of 30 MP Coy as an Area direct report unit. This company was to consist of the existing 30 MP Pl from 36 CBG, the second Pl minus and Coy headquarters (HQ), all located in a leased facility in Lower Sackville, NS, and a third Pl created in Moncton, NB, from the reroll of a Pl from 4 Air Defence Regiment.

By 2005 it was recognized within the Army that Military Police units needed more independence in order to carry out their policing function while centralization of resources would enhance the MPs ability to force generate people for operations. Therefore, in February 2005, and on order of the Army Commander, LFAA issued a draft MIP for the stand up of 3 Garrison MP Coy. This Coy consists of the 3 ASG Gagetown MP Detachment (Det) and the 2nd Bn Royal Canadian Regiment MP Det. On 3 March 2005, the Army Commander signed and issued the Implementation Directive for centralization of garrison MP resources in each Land Force Area.

The creation of the garrison MP Coys was seen as an interim measures and, therefore, on 14 February 2006, the Army Commander signed the Implementation Directive for centralization of all Army MP resources at the Land Force Area level. This order authorized the creation of the MP Units in the four LFAs to be 1, 2, 3, and 5 MP Units. These units would consist of all Regular and Reserve Force Army MPs in each LFA. In LFAA this involved 3 Grn MP Coy (the garrison platoon in Gagetown), 30 MP Coy, the 2 RCR MP Det, and the Area Provost Marshal's Office.

In May 2006, LFAA issued its MIP for the formation and support of 3 MPU. Further, staffing of various full and part-time positions commenced. On 1 October 2006, the amalgamation of 30 MP Coy, 3 Grn MP Coy, and the HQ commenced. On 18 December 2006, the Minister of National Defence issued the Ministerial Organizational Order (MOO) authorizing the creation and stand-up of all MPUs, including 3 MPU. In September 2007, the unit's Canadian Forces Organizational Order was issued.

Further professionalization of the Canadian Military Police occurred when on 7 July 2010, the Chief of Defence Staff ordered that all Military Police would come under the full command of the Canadian Forces Provost Marshal, effective 1 April 2011. In March 2011 the Minister of National Defence authorized all the MPU's names to be changed to MP Regiments. As a result, on 1 April 2011, 3 MPU became 3 Military Police Regiment.

Announced officially in 2014, the old location of 3 Military Police Regiment HQ (at 70 First Lake Drive, Lower Sackville, NS B4C 3E4) moved to the new Maj Robert Campbell Risley Armoury (255 Damascus Rd., Bedford, NS, B4A 0C2).

=== Recruiting ===
For recruiting information contact:

Military Police Recruiter 3 MP Regt: 30 MP Coy: 301 MP Platoon phone 902-864-6062 fax 902-864-7915

or

Canadian Forces Recruiting

=== Sub-unit composition ===
Sub-units are as follows:

- 3 Military Police Regiment Headquarters - Bedford, Nova Scotia (Total Force)
  - 31 MP Company HQ - Oromocto, New Brunswick (Regular Force)
    - 31 MP Platoon - Oromocto, New Brunswick (Regular Force)
    - 31 MP Platoon - St John's, Newfoundland (Regular Force)
  - 30 MP Company HQ - Bedford, Nova Scotia (Reserve Force)
    - 301 Military Police Platoon - Bedford, Nova Scotia (Reserve Force)
    - 302 Military Police Platoon - St. John's, Newfoundland (Reserve Force)
    - 303 Military Police Platoon - Moncton, New Brunswick (Reserve Force)

=== Commanding Officers of 3 MP Regt ===
The following officers have commanded 3 MP Regt:

- Lieutenant-Commander N.A. Nearing - 2023
- Major C.E. Cope - 2021
- Major J.L.H.M. Bergevin - (dates not determined)
- LCdr R.F. Scanlan - effective 2017
- Major D.J. Henderson - effective 6 October 2012
- Major R.F. Campbell- effective 3 December 2011
- Major V.R. Ethier - effective 1 April 2011

=== Commanding Officers of 3 MP Unit ===
- Major V.R. Ethier - effective 9 October 2008
- Major M. Cullum - effective 1 October 2006

=== Regimental Sergeant-Majors of 3 MP Regt ===
- Master Warrant Officer S.J. Waugh - Sep 2021
- Master Warrant Officer Gregory Rodgers - 22 July 2011
- Master Warrant Officer Shawn Walsh - 1 April 2011

=== Unit Sergeant-Majors of 3 MP Unit ===
- Master Warrant Officer Shawn Walsh
- Master Warrant Officer Clare Ramsay
- Master Warrant Officer Jack Kent

=== Commanding Officers 30 MP Coy ===
- Major Moser - effective September 2004

=== Officers Commanding 30 MP Coy ===
- Captain Juarez Reyes (2023-2024)
- Captain MacKinnon (2018-2023)
- Captain Dan MacDougall (dates not determined)
- Major B.L. Cheney - effective Apr 2007
- Major R.F Campbell - effective May 2006

=== Company Sergeant-Majors 30 MP Coy ===
Master Warrant Officer Gary O'Brien (current)

Master Warrant Officer Drew Baker (dates not determined)

Master Warrant Officer Brian Koval (dates not determined)

== Clothing and equipment ==
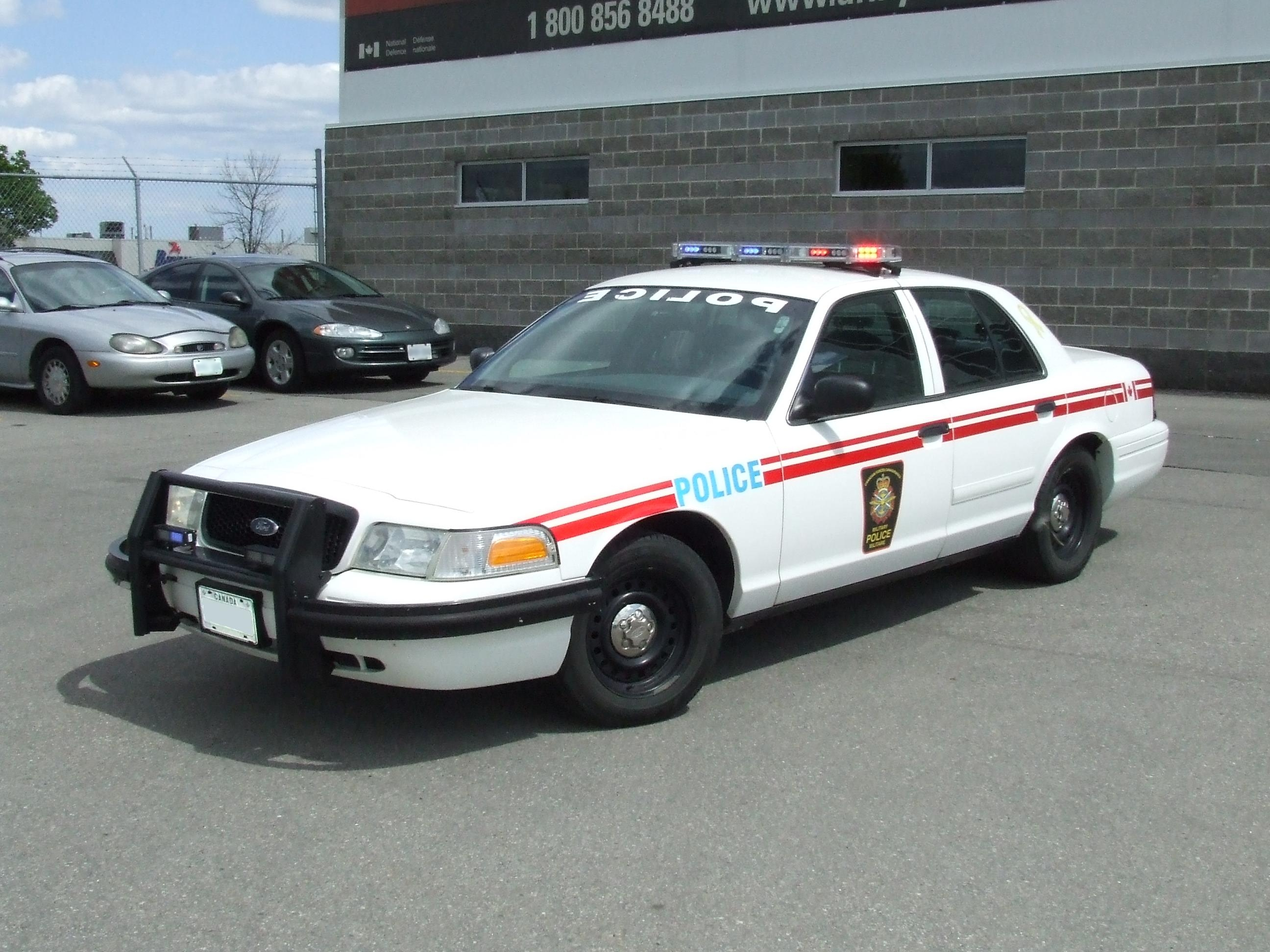
MP Crown Victoria

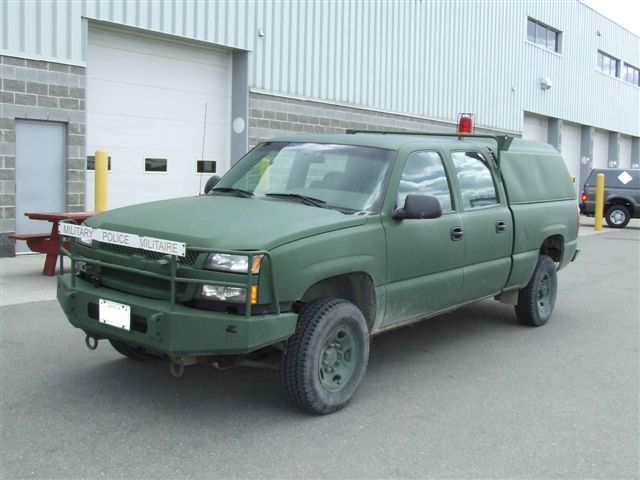
MP MilCOTS

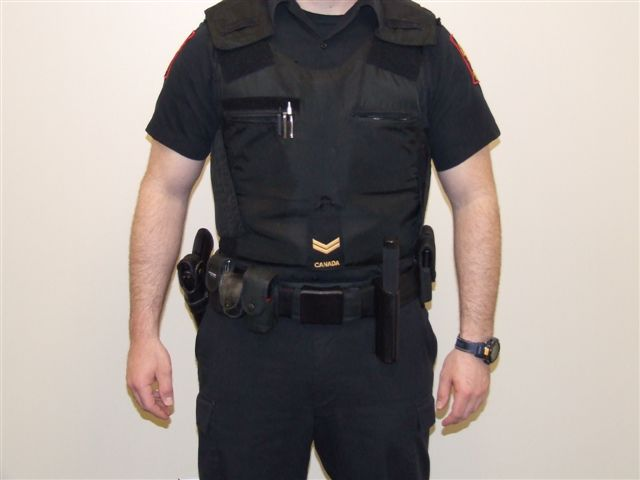
MP Patrol Dress

=== Vehicles ===
3 MP Regt operates the following standard MP vehicles:

Garrison:

- Ford Crown Victoria Police Interceptor *REPLACED*
- Ford Police Interceptor Sedan
- Ford Expedition
- Chevrolet Tahoe

Field:

- Military Commercial Off The Shelf (MilCOTS) (Chevrolet Silverado)

=== Uniforms ===
Members of 3 MP Regt normally wear one of two uniforms; Operational Patrol Dress (OPD) or Canadian Disruptive Pattern (CADPAT). Members of the unit involved in policing duties wear OPD and all others wear CADPAT. During formal events such as parades, members of the unit will wear their Distinct Environmental Uniform (DEU). Therefore, even as a member of an Army unit, members will wear the uniform corresponding to their particular environment; Army, Navy or Air Force. In OPD and CADPAT, unit members who are trained as Military Police wear a scarlet beret. In DEU, the head dress of each element is worn instead of the scarlet beret.

On international operations in Afghanistan, MP wear Arid CADPAT uniforms with the following protective equipment: combat helmet, ballistic eyewear, tactical vest, fragmentation protective vest with bullet resistant plates and beige combat boots. A bayonet (Bayonet System 2005 by Eickhorn Solingen) mounts to the front of the tactical vest. Optional equipment includes a CamelBak drinking system and the small pack system. The wide brimmed combat hat can be worn within the camp.

=== Personal weapons ===
Members of 3 MP Regt mainly use the following personal long and short barrel weapons:

Sig Sauer P320

- SIG Sauer P225 pistol (Regular Force members in Canada and carried by all MP members while conducting international operations)
- Browning Hi-Power (Reserve Force members only)
- C7A1 or C7A2 or C8A3 Rifle

Those involved in garrison policing duties also carry the following for use in the Use of Force continuum:

- Handcuffs
- Pepper spray
- ASP baton

== Unit Internet Web Site ==
http://army.gc.ca/en/5-canadian-division/3-military-police-regiment/index.page

== See also ==
- Canadian Forces Military Police
- 1 Military Police Regiment
- 2 Military Police Regiment
- 5 Military Police Regiment
