= 198th Battalion (Canadian Buffs), CEF =

The 198th (Canadian Buffs) Battalion, CEF was a unit in the Canadian Expeditionary Force during the First World War. Based in Toronto, Ontario, the unit began recruiting during the winter of 1915/16 from The Queen's Own Rifles of Canada, which was based in that city. After sailing to England in March 1917, the battalion was absorbed into the 3rd Reserve Battalion on March 9, 1918. The 198th (Canadian Buffs) Battalion, CEF had one Officer Commanding: Lieut-Col. J. A. Cooper.

The perpetuation of the 198th Battalion was initially assigned in 1920 to the Royal Grenadiers, but reassigned in 1926 to the Queen's Own Rifles.
