= Ernest William Sansom =

Canadian general (1890–1982)

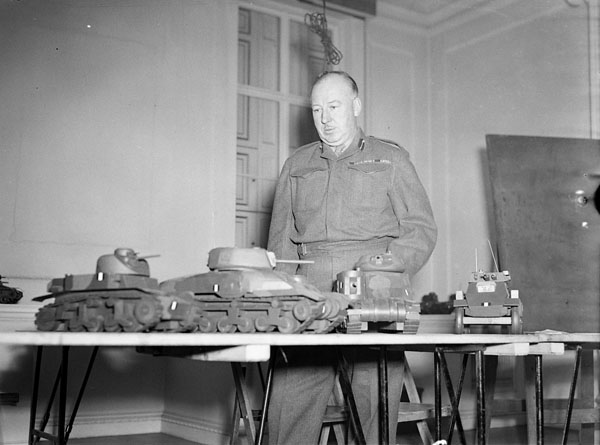
- Lieutenant-General E.W. Sansom, General Officer Commanding II Canadian Corps, April 12, 1943
- Born: December 18, 1890; Stanley, New Brunswick, Canada
- Died: October 18, 1982 (aged 91); Fredericton, New Brunswick, Canada
- Military career
- Service years: 1906–1945
- Rank: Lieutenant-general
- Commands: 3rd Canadian Infantry Division; 5th Canadian (Armoured) Division; II Canadian Corps
- Conflicts: World War I World War II
- Awards: Order of the Bath; Distinguished Service Order

Lieutenant General Ernest William Sansom, CB DSO (December 18, 1890 – October 18, 1982) was a Canadian lieutenant-general who was the 3rd ranking commander of Canadian troops in Europe in 1944 during World War II.

== World War I military career ==
Born in Stanley, New Brunswick, he joined the 71st York Regiment of the Canadian Militia in 1906 and was appointed a lieutenant in 1907. During World War I, he fought in the 12th Infantry Battalion and with the Canadian Machine Gun Corps of the Canadian Expeditionary Force. He would command the 1st Battalion of the Canadian Machine Gun Corps. He was awarded the Distinguished Service Order in 1919.

After the war, in 1920, he joined the Permanent Force and went to the Army Staff College in England from 1924 to 1925. He would hold various staff positions in Canada and eventually was promoted to the rank of colonel.

== World War II military career ==
At the start of World War II, in 1939, he was the director of military training. From 1939 to 1940, he was assistant adjutant and quartermaster general for the 1st Canadian Infantry Division in England. After being promoted to major-general in 1940, he commanded the 3rd Canadian Infantry Division. In 1941, he commanded the 5th Armoured Division. He was promoted to lieutenant-general and was appointed the first commander-in-chief of II Canadian Corps effective on January 15, 1943. In 1944, he returned to Canada for medical reasons. In 1945, he was appointed inspector general, Canadian Army Overseas. He was made a Companion of Order of the Bath in 1945. He retired in 1945.

== Post war ==
After the war, he worked for various fund-raising organizations, including the Canadian March of Dimes and the Combined Appeal for the Handicapped.

In the 1945 election, he ran unsuccessfully as the Progressive Conservative candidate for the House of Commons of Canada in the New Brunswick riding of York—Sunbury. He lost again in a 1947 by-election.

He died in Fredericton, New Brunswick, in 1982.

== Sources ==
- "Ernest William Sansom fonds". Library and Archives Canada. Archived from the original on September 30, 2007.
- "Ernest William Sansom". Globe and Mail. Canada. October 19, 1982.
- "Attestation paper". Library and Archives Canada.
- Generals of World War II
- Granatstein, Jack (1993). The Generals: The Canadian Army's Senior Commanders in the Second World War. Stoddart Publishing. ISBN 978-0773727397.

Military offices
Preceded by New post	GOC 3rd Canadian Infantry Division; 1940–1941	Succeeded by Charles Basil Price
Preceded by New post	GOC 5th (Canadian) Armoured Division; 1941–1943	Succeeded by Charles Ramsay Stirling Stein
Preceded by New post	GOC II Canadian Corps; 1943–1944	Succeeded by Guy Simonds
