= 208th Battalion (Canadian Irish), CEF =

The 208th (Canadian Irish) Battalion, CEF was a unit in the Canadian Expeditionary Force during the First World War. Based in Toronto, Ontario, the unit began recruiting during the winter of 1915/16 in that city and the surrounding district. After sailing to England in May 1917, the battalion was absorbed into the 2nd and 8th Reserve Battalions on January 3, 1918. The 208th (Canadian Irish) Battalion, CEF had two Officer Commanding: Lieut-Col. T. H. Lennox (April 3, 1917—June 20, 1917) and Lieut-Col. W. P. Malone (June 20, 1917—January 11, 1918).
