= Operation Goldflake =

1945 Allied unit relocation in Europe

Coordinates: 43°17′47″N 05°22′12″E

Operation Goldflake was the administrative move of I Canadian Corps (in essence, almost all Canadian combatant units) and the British 5th Infantry Division from Italy to Northwestern Europe during the Second World War. British-led forces had been fighting in Italy since the Allied invasion of Sicily in July 1943. The Allied commanders decided to move the British and Canadian troops to fight in northwestern Europe in the spring of 1945.

== Planning phase ==
Operation Goldflake was the codename of the plan to arrange the move and to conceal the shifting of such a large number of troops to another war theatre. The move was publicized as a regrouping away from the Italian front to allow for recuperation of the troops. A massive amount of planning was needed, since troops and administrative centres were widely dispersed in southern Italy. Trains and road convoys had to be arranged, while not leaving any of the front-lines vulnerable to counter-attacks by the German forces. Troops and materiel were to be moved from ports at Naples and Leghorn in Italy to Marseilles in France, at the rate of 3700 people, 40 tanks, 650 wheeled vehicles, and 50 carriers each day.

== Conduct phase ==
Embarkation began on February 22 and most trips to Marseille took two days. It was then a five-day drive to the Belgian frontier, a distance of 1,085 km (674 mi) By the end of April, over 60,000 troops and support personnel had been moved from Italy to north-western Europe.

Speed was essential, but the Allies did not want the Germans to learn about the plans. The convoys would be vulnerable while in transit, so Operation Penknife was created to hide the movement of the Canadians out of Italy. A special, temporary organization, called 1st Canadian Special Basra Unit was created. "Basra" was the code name for the cover plan and the unit included 230 officers and men taken from other groups being disbanded (such as the No. 1 Anti-Malaria Control Unit). Men would drive throughout the area in Italy where the Germans thought the Canadians were located and post location signs that were then moved the next day. All Canadian clubs, hostels, leave centres and hospitals were kept open. The Canadian forces newsletter, "The Maple Leaf" continued to be published in Rome until mid-March.

The Royal Canadian Corps of Signals continued to maintain the normal level of wireless traffic by sending dummy messages. Their success was shown by the efforts of the Germans to jam these messages.

German documents captured after the war showed that Operation Penknife was successful in concealing the movement of Canadian troops from Italy to Belgium. Until late March, German intelligence maps showed the Canadians to be at various places in Italy. On March 17, when all Canadians were either in Belgium or northern France, the Germans still believed the Canadians were in the Ancona area, although the exact location of the 1st Canadian Armoured Brigade was unknown. Only in mid-April did the German maps show the absence of Canadian troops.

Security was eventually broken by a Canadian journalist on April 3, 1945, announcing that all Canadian infantry and armoured troops had been reunited under the command of General Harry Crerar. Since the Allied command still had reason to believe the Germans were uncertain of the location of the Canadians, permission to make an official announcement of the transfer was delayed until April 20. Canadians were officially informed on April 23, 1945, although media silence had only been maintained by censorship, since it had already become common knowledge for many in Canada.
