= I Canadian Corps =

Canadian Army corps during the Second World War

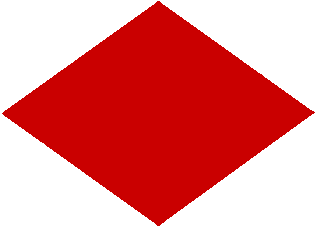
- Formation patch worn by corps-level personnel.
- Active: 1942–1945
- Country: Canada
- Branch: Canadian Army
- Type: Corps

Commanders
- Notable commanders: Eedson Burns; Charles Foulkes

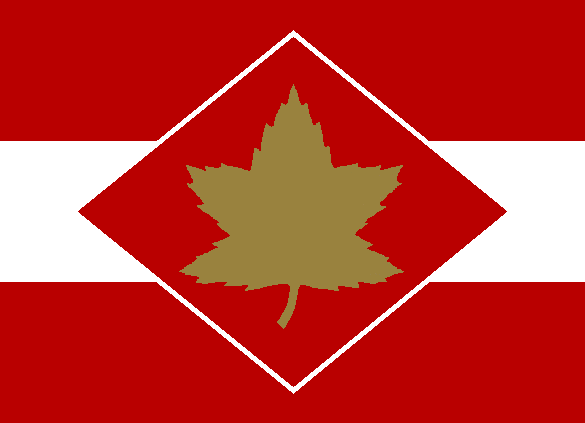
The formation sign used to identify vehicles associated with corps-level units.

I Canadian Corps was one of the two corps fielded by the Canadian Army during the Second World War, the other being II Canadian Corps.

== History ==
From December 24, 1940, until the formation of the First Canadian Army in April 1942, there was a single unnumbered Canadian Corps. I Canadian Corps became operational in Italy in November 1943 when the 5th Canadian (Armoured) Division joined the 1st Canadian Infantry Division, which had been assigned to the British Eighth Army immediately prior to the Allied invasion of Sicily in July 1943. I Canadian Corps was commanded successively by Lieutenant-General Harry Crerar (April 6, 1942, to March 19, 1944), Lieutenant-General Eedson Burns (March 20 to November 5, 1944), and Lieutenant-General Charles Foulkes (November 10, 1944, to July 17, 1945).

However, the 1st Canadian Infantry Division took part in the Italian Campaign, participating in the Moro River Campaign and the Battle of Ortona in December 1943 as part of British V Corps and it was not until the fourth Battle of Monte Cassino (Operation Diadem) in May 1944 that I Canadian Corps fought its first battle as a corps. The Eighth Army held the corps in reserve until after the Gustav defences in the Liri valley had been broken and then brought it forward to assault successfully the next defensive line, the Hitler Line, shortly before the Allied capture of Rome in early June. Having taken part in the Allies' northward advance to Florence, the corps then took part in Operation Olive, the assault on the Gothic Line, in September 1944 before being transported during January–February 1945 in Operation Goldflake to rejoin the rest of the First Canadian Army in Belgium and the Netherlands. There the corps participated in the campaign to complete the liberation of the Netherlands. On May 6, 1945, at Wageningen, Lieutenant-General Foulkes received the final surrender by Colonel General Johannes Blaskowitz of all remaining German forces still active in the Netherlands. The corps was deactivated on July 17, 1945, as part of general demobilization.

Although nominally a Canadian formation, I Canadian Corps contained significant elements at different times from other Allied countries. For example, in Italy, during the assault on the Gothic Line in the fall of 1944, the corps included the British 4th Infantry Division, the 2nd New Zealand Division and the 3rd Greek Mountain Brigade. During the final campaign to liberate the Netherlands, the corps included for a time the British 49th Infantry Division.

== 21st century ==
In 2015, personnel of the Canadian Army Doctrine and Training Centre, headquartered at CFB Kingston, began wearing the formation patch of I Canadian Corps on their ceremonial and service dress uniforms.

== Major operations ==
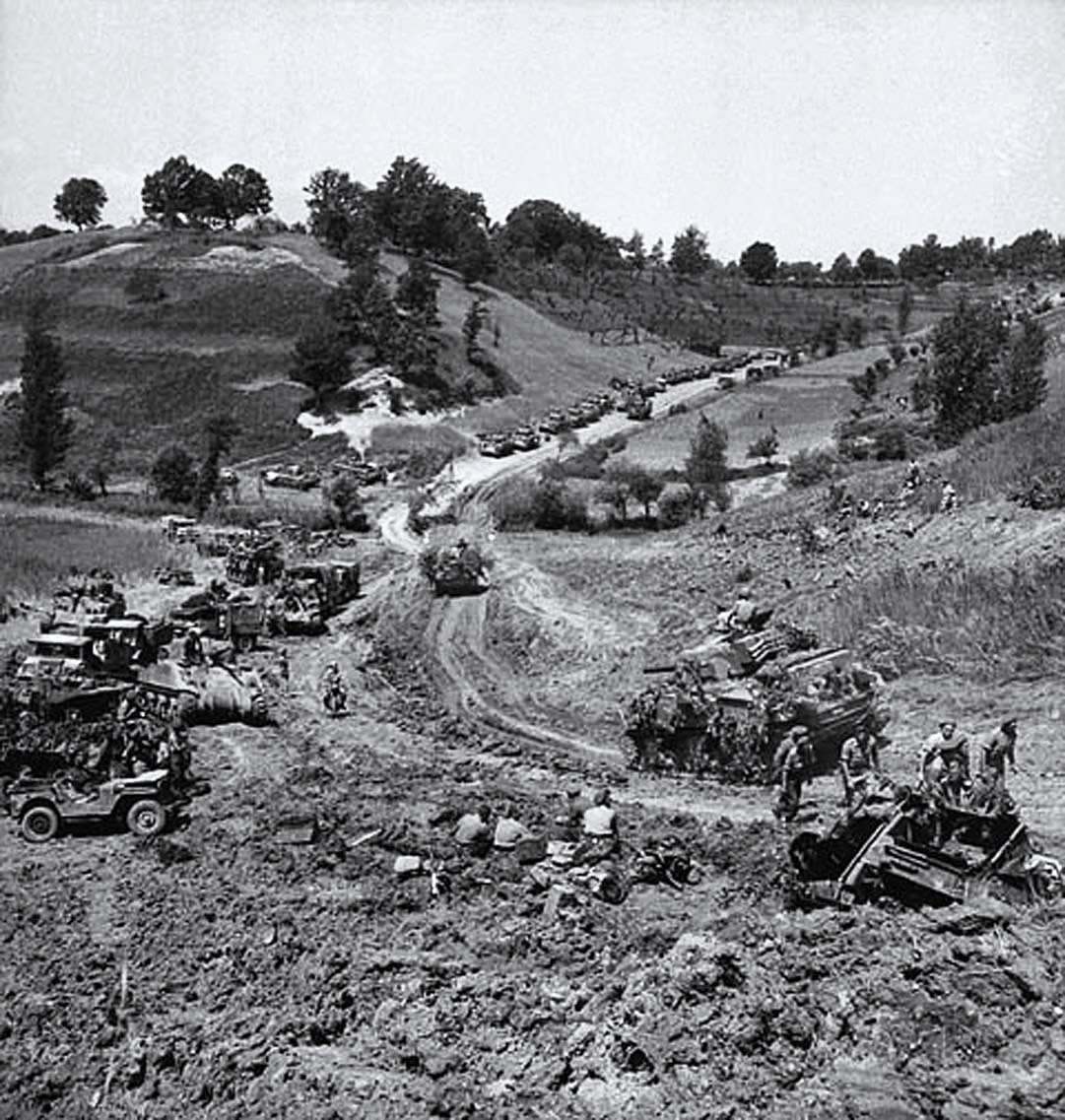
I Canadian Corps forces advancing from the Gustav Line to the Hitler Line during the Liri Valley Offensive, May 24, 1944.

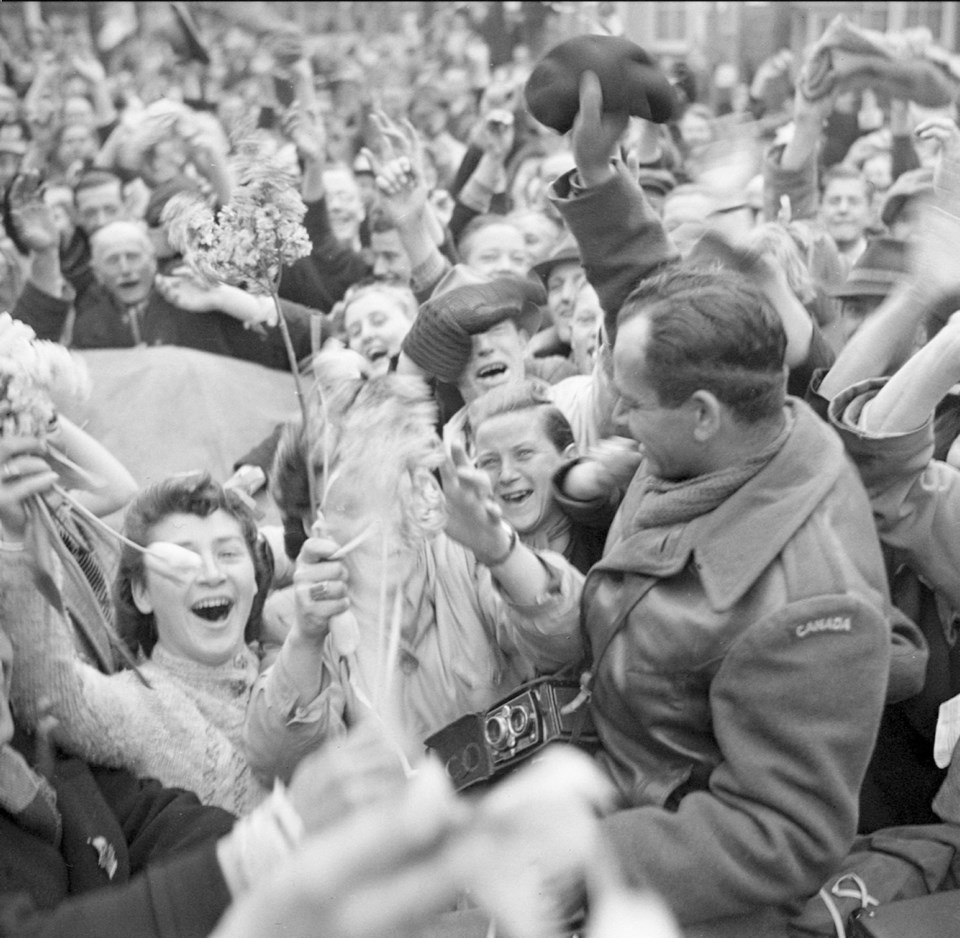
Dutch civilians celebrating the arrival of I Canadian Corps troops in Utrecht after the German surrender, May 7, 1945.

- Operation Timberwolf, December 1943
- Operation Morning Glory, December 1943
- Operation Diadem, Liri Valley Offensive, May 1944
- Operation Olive, assault on the Gothic Line, September 1944
- Operation Goldflake, transport from Italy to the Netherlands, February–March 1945
- Operation Destroyer, advance from Nijmegen to Arnhem, April 1945
- Advance to Harderwijk on the coast of the IJsselmeer, April 1945
- Liberation of the Netherlands, March–May 1945
- Lieutenant-General Foulkes receives the surrender of all German forces in the Netherlands, May 5, 1945
- Security duties, delivery of relief supplies and infrastructure repair projects in the Netherlands, May–July, 1945

== Order of Battle in Italy, 1944-45 ==
- 1st Canadian Infantry Division
- 5th Canadian Armoured Division
- 1st Canadian Armoured Brigade
- Corps Troops
  - I Corps Defence Company, Lorne Scots
  - 1st Armoured Car Regiment (Royal Canadian Dragoons)
  - 7th Anti-Tank Regiment, Royal Canadian Artillery (RCA)
  - 1st Survey Regiment, RCA
  - 9th Field Park Company, Royal Canadian Engineers (RCE)
  - 12th Field Company, RCE
  - 13th Field Company, RCE
  - 14th Field Company, RCE
  - 1st Drilling Company, RCE
  - I Canadian Corps Headquarters Signals, Royal Canadian Corps of Signals
  - No. 31 Corps Troops Company, Royal Canadian Army Service Corps (RCASC)
  - No. 32 Corps Troops Company, RCASC
  - I Canadian Corps Transport Company, RCASC
  - No. 1 Motor Ambulance Company, RCASC
  - No. 1 Headquarters Corps Car Company, RCASC
  - Nos. 4 & 5 Casualty Clearing Stations, Royal Canadian Army Medical Corps (RCAMC)
  - No. 8 Field Dressing Section, RCAMC
  - No. 5 Field Hygiene Section, RCAMC
  - Nos. 1, 3 & 8 Dental Companies, Canadian Dental Corps (CDC)
  - No. 11 Base Dental Company, CDC
  - No. 1 Corps and Army Troops Sub-Park, Royal Canadian Ordnance Corps (RCOC)
  - I Corps Troops Workshop, Royal Canadian Electrical and Mechanical Engineers (RCEME)
  - No. 1 Recovery Company, RCEME
  - No. 3 Provost Company, Canadian Provost Corps (C Pro C)
- Attached First Canadian Army Troops
  - No. 1 Army Group Royal Canadian Artillery
    - 11th Army Field Regiment, RCA
    - 1st Medium Regiment, RCA
    - 2nd Medium Regiment, RCA
    - 5th Medium Regiment, RCA
  - No. 41 Army Transport Company, RCASC
  - "H" Squadron, 25th Canadian Armoured Delivery Regiment (The Elgin Regiment), Canadian Armoured Corps
  - Nos. 1, 2 & 3 Field Transfusion Units, RCAMC
  - Nos. 3 & 16 Field Dressing Stations, RCAMC
  - Nos. 1, 3, 5, 14, 15 & 28 General Hospitals, RCAMC
  - No. 1 Convalescent Depot, RCAMC
  - Nos. 1, 2 & 3 Field Surgical Units, RCAMC

== Commanders ==
These officers commanded the I Canadian Corps:

- Lieutenant-General Andrew G. L. McNaughton, (July 19, 1940, to April 5, 1942)
- Lieutenant-General Harry Crerar (April 8, 1942, to March 19, 1944)
- Lieutenant-General E. L. M. Burns (March 20 to November 5, 1944)
- Lieutenant-General Charles Foulkes (November 10, 1944, to July 17, 1945)

== See also ==
- Moro River Campaign
- Battle of Ortona
- Battle of Monte Cassino
- Gothic Line
