= Arielli =

- Comune
- Comune di Arielli
- Location within Italy Location within Abruzzo
- Coordinates: 42°16′N 14°18′E
- Country: Italy
- Region: Abruzzo
- Province: Chieti (CH)
- Frazioni: Colle Martino, Contrada Valle, Fonte delle Chiavi, Fonte Grande, Pescarese, San Romano, Villa Carloni

Government
  - Mayor: Catia Benarrivato

Area
  - Total: 11.72 km^{2} (4.53 sq mi)
- Elevation: 298 m (978 ft)

Population (30 April 2017)
  - Total: 1,143
  - Density: 97.53/km^{2} (252.6/sq mi)
- Demonym: Ariellesi
- Time zone: UTC+1 (CET)
  - Summer (DST): UTC+2 (CEST)
- Postal code: 66030
- Dialing code: 0871
- Patron saint: St. Michael Archangel
- Saint day: 29 September
- Website: Official website

Arielli (Neapolitan: Rijille) is a village and comune in the province of Chieti, Abruzzo, central-eastern Italy, located on a hill overlooking the spring area of the homonymous river.

Its territory is hilly, rich in vineyards and olive groves.

Arielli was on the Gustav Line during WW2.

== Main sights ==
- Church of Madonna delle Grazie, with a terracotta statue of the Holy Mary dating from the 1590.
- Church of San Rocco (12th century)
- Church of San Michele Arcangelo
