= 37 Canadian Brigade Group =

Brigade of the Canadian Army

- 37^{e} Groupe-brigade du Canada
- Creator(s) Original concept of the Unit, assisted by Robert D. Watt, Chief Herald of Canada, Cathy Sabourin, Fraser Herald, and the Heralds of the Canadian Heraldic Authority Painter Robert Grey Calligrapher Suzzann Wright
- Active: October 4, 1997 to current
- Country: Canada
- Branch: Canadian Army, Primary Reserve
- Type: Headquarters
- Part of: 2nd Canadian Division
- Garrison/HQ: Moncton, New Brunswick
- Nickname: 37 CBG or 37
- Motto: Uniti valentiores (Latin for 'United we are stronger')
- March: Commander: Colonel Rénald (Ray) Dufour

Insignia
NATO Map Symbol
37 CBG
2 Cdn Div
- Abbreviation: 37 CBG

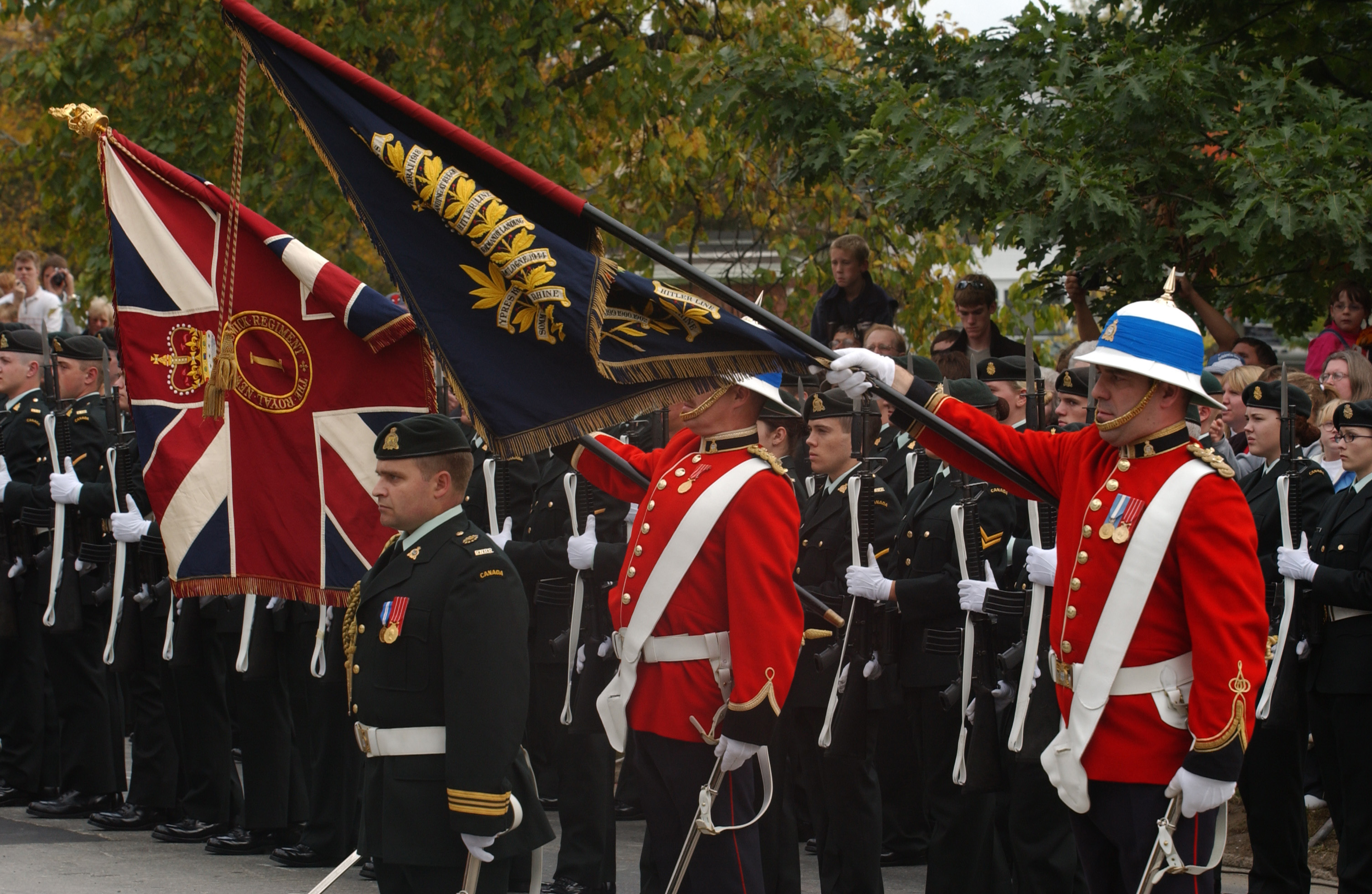
RNBR Colour Guard at Golden Jubilee of Elizabeth II celebration in Fredericton, 10 Oct 2002.

37 Canadian Brigade Group (French: 37^{e} Groupe-brigade du Canada) is a reserve component brigade of the Canadian Army, which supervises Militia units in 2nd Canadian Division for New Brunswick and Newfoundland and Labrador. It was created by merging the New Brunswick Militia District and the Newfoundland and Labrador Militia District.

37 Canadian Brigade Group, headquartered in Moncton, New Brunswick, comprises roughly 1500 service members across all Army Reserve Units in New Brunswick and Newfoundland and Labrador. 37 CBG is focused on readiness and force generation here in Canada for domestic operations including the Arctic Response Company Group (ARCG) as well as expeditionary operations.

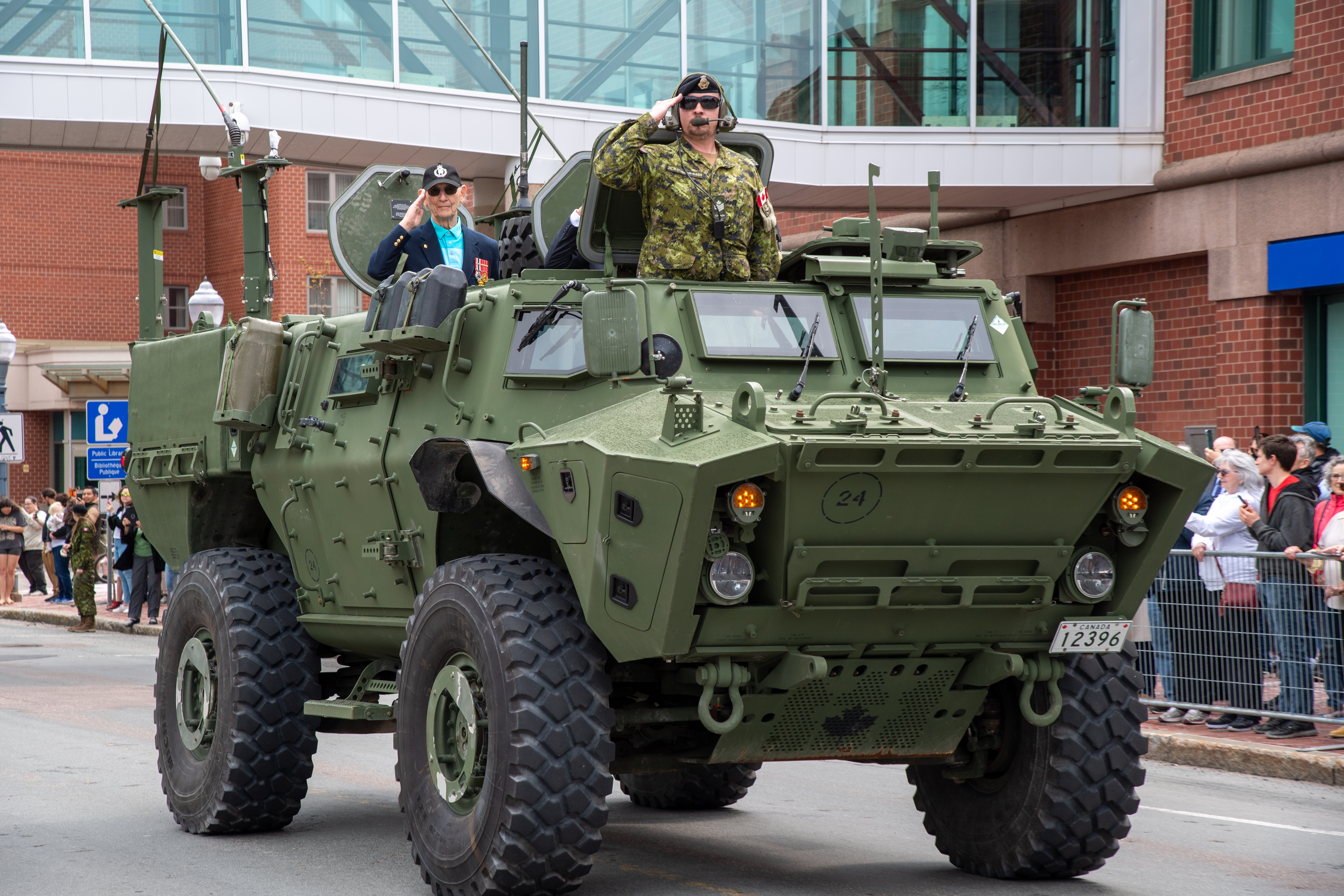
Members from 37 CBG attend the Freedom of the City Parade in Moncton on 20 May 2023. 2023 was the 175th anniversary of the oldest continuously serving armoured regiment in Canada, the 8th Canadian Hussars. The parade was attended by the Princess Royal, their colonel-in-chief.

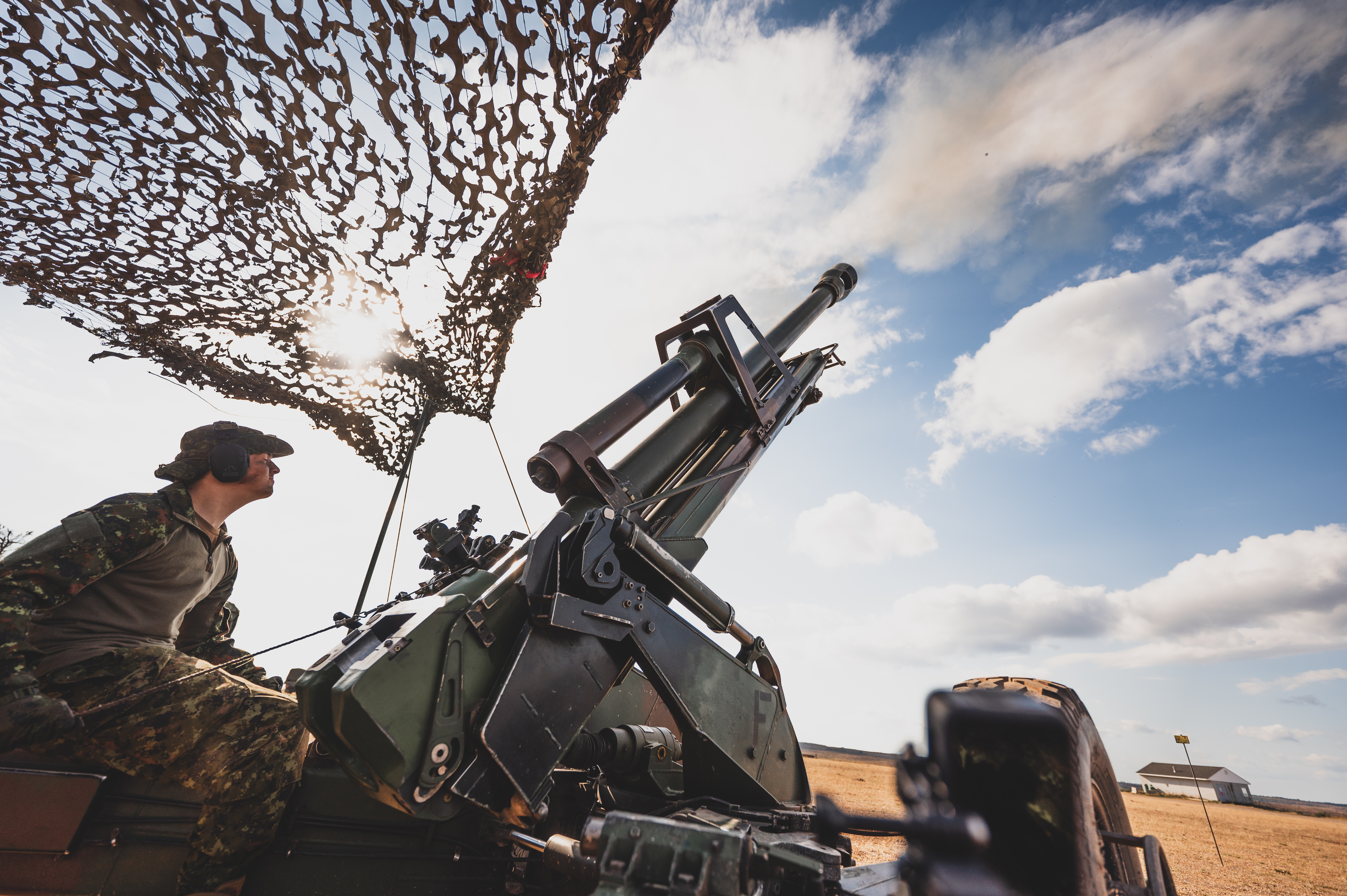
Members of 37 CBG participate in Fallex 2023 at 5th Canadian Division Support Base Gagetown 27–29 October 2023.

== Brigade units ==
Unit	Role	Locations
37 Canadian Brigade Group Headquarters	Headquarters	Moncton, New Brunswick
8th Canadian Hussars (Princess Louise's)	Cavalry	Moncton, New Brunswick
3rd Field Artillery Regiment, RCA	Artillery	Saint John, New Brunswick
37 Combat Engineer Regiment	Combat engineer	St. John's, Newfoundland and Labrador, and Fredericton, New Brunswick
37 Signal Regiment	Communications	Saint John, New Brunswick, and St. John's, Newfoundland and Labrador
The Royal New Brunswick Regiment (Carleton & York)	Light infantry	Fredericton, Edmundston, Grand Falls, and Saint John, New Brunswick
The North Shore (New Brunswick) Regiment	Light infantry	Bathurst, Campbellton, Miramichi, and Moncton, New Brunswick
1st Battalion, The Royal Newfoundland Regiment	Light infantry	St. John's, Newfoundland and Labrador
2nd Battalion, The Royal Newfoundland Regiment	Light infantry	Corner Brook, Grand Falls-Windsor, and Stephenville
37 Service Battalion	Service and support	Saint John, New Brunswick, and St. John's, Newfoundland and Labrador

Cities with 37 CBG units

== History ==
=== New Brunswick origins ===
October 11, 1770 is the date that the Sunbury County Militia was authorized in Sunbury County Nova Scotia (what is now all of western New Brunswick). In 1839 units of the New Brunswick Militia assisted regular British troops in the preparations to defend the province during what became known as, the bloodless, Aroostook War. In 1866 units of the New Brunswick Militia were deployed along the province’s border with the United States to counter the threat of the Fenian Raids. Confederation in 1867 brought an end to the New Brunswick Militia and a start to the new Canadian Militia.

=== Newfoundland origins ===
The early origins of the militia in Newfoundland are based in the existence of numerous local militia units raised in the colony in the eighteenth century. Prominent Newfoundland militias include Michael Gill's militia which was involved in the 1704 defence of Bonavista, the St. Mary's Militia that captured an American privateer during the American Revolution, and the 150 Newfoundland militiamen who served with the Royal Highland Emigrants during the Battle of Quebec.

During World War 1, 6,200 Newfoundlanders joined the land expeditionary component of Newfoundland’s wartime force known as the Newfoundland Regiment with 1300 of them losing their lives by the end of the war. At Beaumont-Hamel, during the battle of the Somme, on July 1, 1916, 800 members of the Newfoundland Regiment went into battle and only 68 were able to answer roll call the next day. In honour of their sacrifice, Newfoundlanders continue to observe July 1 as Memorial Day.

In September, 1939 a local defence militia unit was formed in Newfoundland as a response to the presence of the German Navy in Atlantic waters. It was divided into active and part-time components respectively designated the Newfoundland Militia and Newfoundland Auxiliary Militia or Home Guard. In March 1943 the active force was redesignated the Newfoundland Regiment, and the Home Guard became the Newfoundland Militia. The Newfoundland forces, which also included a Coastal Defence Battery on Bell Island, carried out guard duty at vulnerable points and acted as a training depot for volunteers for the two Royal Artillery Regiments.

=== Post Second World War ===
In 1946, Regular and Reserve land forces in the Maritime provinces became elements of the Canadian Army’s Eastern Command. By 1956, in the wake of Newfoundland’s 1949 confederation, Eastern Command comprised four Areas, one for each Atlantic province. Following the Canadian Armed Forces’ unification in 1968, Reserve forces became part of Atlantic Militia Area, comprising six Militia Districts. In 1991, these were again reorganized, along with Regular elements, into Land Force Atlantic Area. 37 Canadian Brigade Group as it exists today was created by merging the New Brunswick Militia District and the Newfoundland and Labrador Militia District on October 4, 1997.

=== Early brigade history (1997 to 2002) ===
37 Canadian Brigade Group commenced operations on 4 October 1997. The brigade group consists of all the nine Militia units located in New Brunswick and Newfoundland. Until that time, command of these units rested with the New Brunswick/Prince Edward Island District Headquarters and the Newfoundland District Headquarters. These two headquarters were officially disbanded with the standup of 37 CBG. Colonel E.P. Ring was the first commander of 37 CBG.

In its short history, this brigade sent Regular and Reserve soldiers to Ontario to provide assistance in the aftermath of the 1998 ice storm. Soldiers from this brigade assisted with the clean-up of a similar storm that struck the Saint John and Fundy coast of New Brunswick that same year. When Swissair Flight 111 crashed, soldiers from 37 CBG were sent to assist.
