= Canadian Provost Corps =

Military police corps of the Canadian Army

- Active: 1939–1946
- Country: Canada
- Type: Corps
- Role: (Canadian Army) Permanent Active Militia
- Motto: Discipline Through Example

The Canadian Provost Corps (C Pro C) was the military police corps of the Canadian Army. The Canadian Provost Corps was authorized on 15 June 1940. The Canadian Provost Corps was amalgamated with the police forces of the Royal Canadian Navy and Royal Canadian Air Force to become a new, unified branch of the Canadian Forces in 1968, known as the Canadian Armed Forces Security and Intelligence Branch.

== Canadian Military Police Corps ==
During the early years of World War I, Regimental Police were the only police element in the Canadian Army. The situation was such that the 2nd Canadian Division made its brigades responsible for the provision of "Trench Police" to perform traffic control duties.

The Canadian Military Police Corps was formed during October 1917, with a total of 850 all ranks.

The CMPC school was formed at Ottawa on 1 June 1918, and closed ten months later on 11 March 1919.

The CMPC itself was disbanded on 30 June 1920.

== RCMP ==
At the outbreak of World War II, the Canadian Army was without any form of military police. On September 13, 1939, the Royal Canadian Mounted Police (RCMP) requested and received permission to form a Provost Company using volunteers from its ranks. This was designated 1 Provost Company (RCMP), of the 1st Canadian Infantry Division, Canadian Active Service Force. Initially, it was 120 men; many of them were in the UK by the end of 1939.

== Second World War ==
In mid June 1940, the Canadian Provost Corps was officially born out of 1 Provost Company. For most of 1940, 1 Provost Company was stationed in England, but was involved in the battles during the fall of France (Brest, Laval, Sable and Chateaubriant).

The Canadian Provost Corps Training Centre operated from November 1942 to May 1946, training a total of 1,897 all ranks.

During World War II, most of the Canadian Army in England was stationed at Aldershot.

Canadian MPs wore red-topped caps and were armed with .38 revolvers carried in a holster on the left hip together with white pattern 1937 web belt, brace and brace attachment in the same manner as the British Corps of Military Police (CMP).

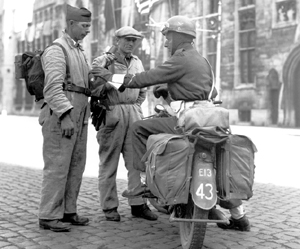
Lance-Corporal N.G. Rosborough of the Canadian Provost Corps talking to members of the Belgian Resistance in Bruges during the Battle of the Scheldt; September 1944

The corps saw action for the first time during the Battle of Hong Kong where all 8 would be captured, along with the entire garrison, and 2 would die in Japanese POW camps. The corps would see their first action in the European Theater on 19 August 1942 in the Dieppe Raid. Of the 41 members who took part, 22 returned to England, one was killed, eighteen were taken prisoner (seven of them being wounded). During 1943, 1 Provost Company became involved in operations in Sicily (Pachino, Valguarnera, Assoro, Agira, Adrano and Regalbuto) and after the crossing into Italy on 3 September 1943, the company continued its support of the I Canadian Corps as part of the Eighth Army as Allied forces crept northwards from the toe of Italy. Places where 1 Provost Company saw action included: Campobasso, Torella, Motta Montecorvino, San Leonardo, The Gully, and Ortona in 1943; San Nicola, San Tommaso, Cassino II, the Gustav Line, the Liri Valley, the Hitler Line, and Got Lamone Crossing in 1944; and Misano Ridge, Rimini Line, San Martino, San Lorenzo, and Fosso Vecchio in 1945. In the Cassino area of Italy, the Canadian Provost assisted the British CMP on "Highway 6", where 11,000 vehicles were handled every day. The Canadians were part of twenty-four provost and traffic control companies and two Special Investigation Branch sections that were attached to the Eighth Army.

Shortly after the Normandy landings in June 1944, the 2nd Canadian Line of Communications (LoC) Provost HQ and six sections were deployed in Northern France on traffic control duties. 1 Provost Company also saw action at Apeldoorn in the Netherlands.

On 18 October 1945, 1 Provost Company was de-activated when it was repatriated to Canada. By September 1945, the C Pro C numbered 6,120 men.

== Postwar history ==
The Canadian Provost Corps School was formed at Camp Borden in the late 1940s, and by 1948 there were at least ten Provost Companies, including five Militia Provost Companies, in the Canadian Army.

25 Provost Detachment headed to Korea in 1950, where it formed part of 1 Commonwealth Division Provost Company ("1 COMWEL Div Pro Coy"). It was stated in the Standing Orders of this unit that it was the only integrated unit of its kind in the Allied Forces. In 1955, the Provost Detachment was disbanded after a total of 264 Canadian MPs had served in Korea.

From 23 November 1951, the 27th Brigade Provost Detachment was located in Hanover, West Germany with NATO. In November 1958, the 4 Canadian Infantry Brigade Group rotated into Germany and the Provost Platoon in Germany was renamed No.4 Provost Platoon.

During 1968, the platoon was renamed 4 Military Police Platoon and was located at Canadian Forces Base Lahr until the pull out of 4 Canadian Mechanised Battle Group (CMBG) in 1992.

In March 1964, the United Nations authorized a force to serve on the island of Cyprus. Members of the Military Police served on Cyprus from that time until Canada pulled out in 1992.

On 1 February 1968, the Provost Corps ceased to exist, when all branches of the Canadian military were unified into the Canadian Forces and security became the responsibility of the Canadian Armed Forces Security and Intelligence Branch.

The Canadian Military Police Heritage Hall at Canadian Forces Base Borden is a museum dedicated to the memory of the Canadian Provost Corps, Royal Canadian Air Force Service Police and Royal Canadian Navy Naval Shore Patrol Veterans in the Canadian Forces.

== Alliances ==
- Corps of Royal Military Police (until 1968)
- Military Provost Staff Corps (until 1968)

== Related units ==
- Royal Canadian Air Force Police
