= Hitler Line =

German defensive line in Italy during World War II

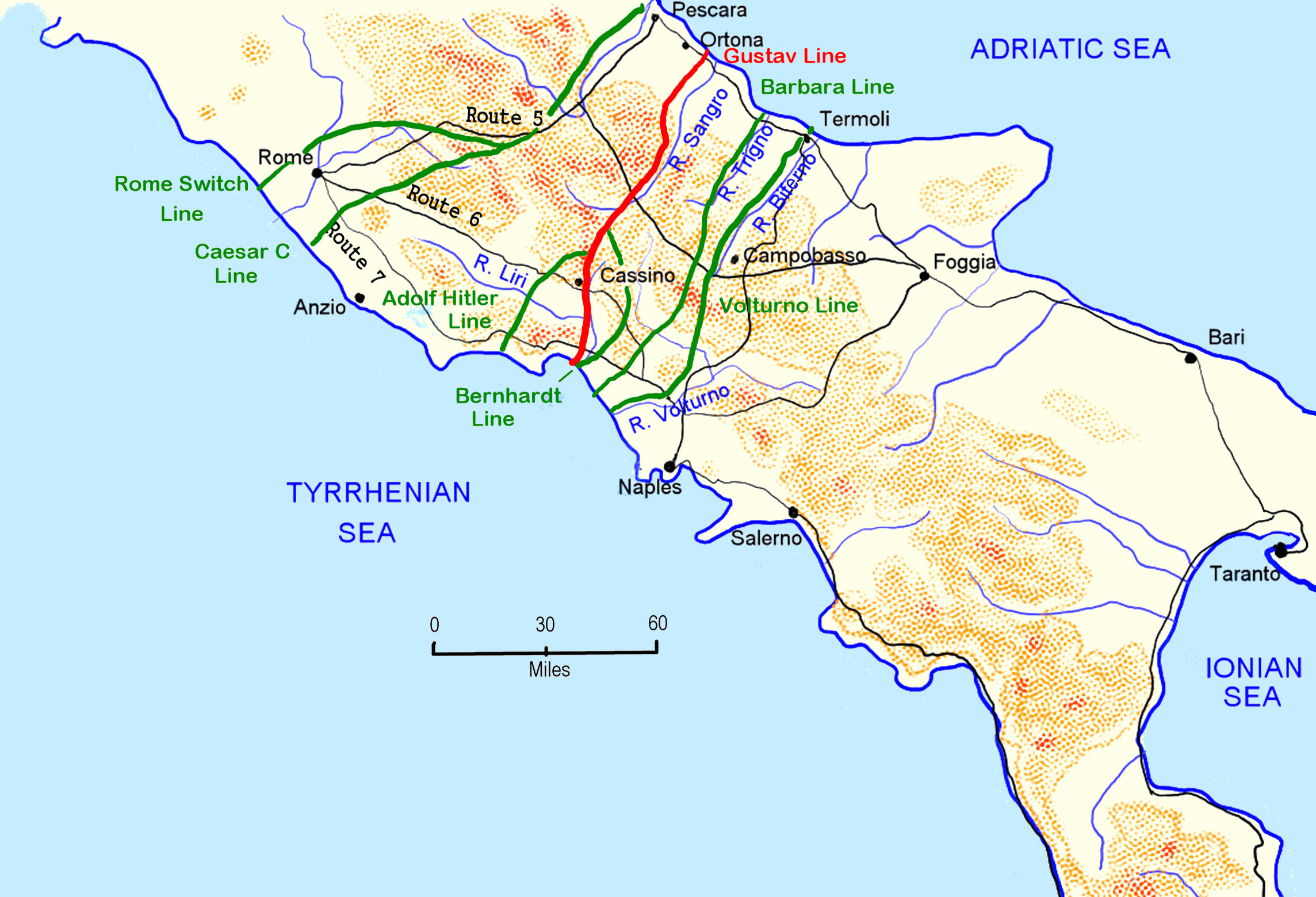
German-prepared defensive lines south of Rome.

The Hitler Line was a German Army defensive line in central Italy during the Second World War. The strong points of the line were at Piedimonte, Pontecorvo, and Aquino. In May 1944, the line was renamed the Senger Line, after General Fridolin von Senger und Etterlin, one of the generals commanding Axis forces in the area. That was done at Adolf Hitler's insistence to minimise any propaganda significance if the line was penetrated.

The line was a so-called "switch line", joined the Gustav Line at Monte Cairo and provided a fall-back position behind the Gustav Line. The line was breached on 24 May 1944 on the British Eighth Army's front by the 1st Canadian Infantry Division and 5th Canadian Armoured Division, which attacked with II Polish Corps on their right. The first to breach the line, at Pontecorvo, were the 1st Canadian Division's 4th Reconnaissance Regiment (4th Princess Louise Dragoon Guards). The Polish Corps captured Piedimonte on 25 May, and the line collapsed. The next German line was the Caesar C line.
