= Irish Regiment of Canada =

- Regimental badge
- Active: 1915–present
- Country: Canada
- Branch: Canadian Army
- Type: Line Infantry
- Role: Light infantry
- Size: One battalion
- Part of: 33 Canadian Brigade Group
- Garrison/HQ: Sudbury, Ontario
- Motto: Fíor go bás (Irish for 'faithful until death')
- March: "Garry Owen"
- Engagements: First World War; Second World War; War in Afghanistan
- Battle honours: See #Battle honours

Commanders
- Colonel-in-chief: Charles III

Insignia
- Headdress: Caubeen
- Tartan: O'Saffron

The Irish Regiment of Canada is a Primary Reserve infantry regiment of the Canadian Army based in Sudbury, Ontario. It is part of the 2nd Canadian Division's 33 Canadian Brigade Group. Currently one battalion of the regiment exists.

The Irish regiment was founded in 1915 with headquarters in Toronto. The modern incarnation was formed in Sudbury in 1965 by the conversion of the 58th Field Artillery Regiment, RCA, which became 2nd Battalion, The Irish Regiment of Canada (Sudbury). At the same time, the original battalion in Toronto was reduced to nil strength and placed on the Supplementary Order of Battle as the 1st Battalion, The Irish Regiment of Canada.

In 1931 they became the only kilted Irish regiment in the world with the adoption of their unique tartan often called "O'Saffron", designed by Thomas Gordon Ltd. of Glasgow. (Irish regiments in the British Army utilize kilted pipers wearing a solid-coloured saffron kilt.) They also share the caubeen headdress common to other Irish regiments. The badge and hackle are worn above the right eye, with the left side of the caubeen pulled down – the opposite of the way berets are worn.

== Lineage ==
Regimental colour of the 2nd Battalion

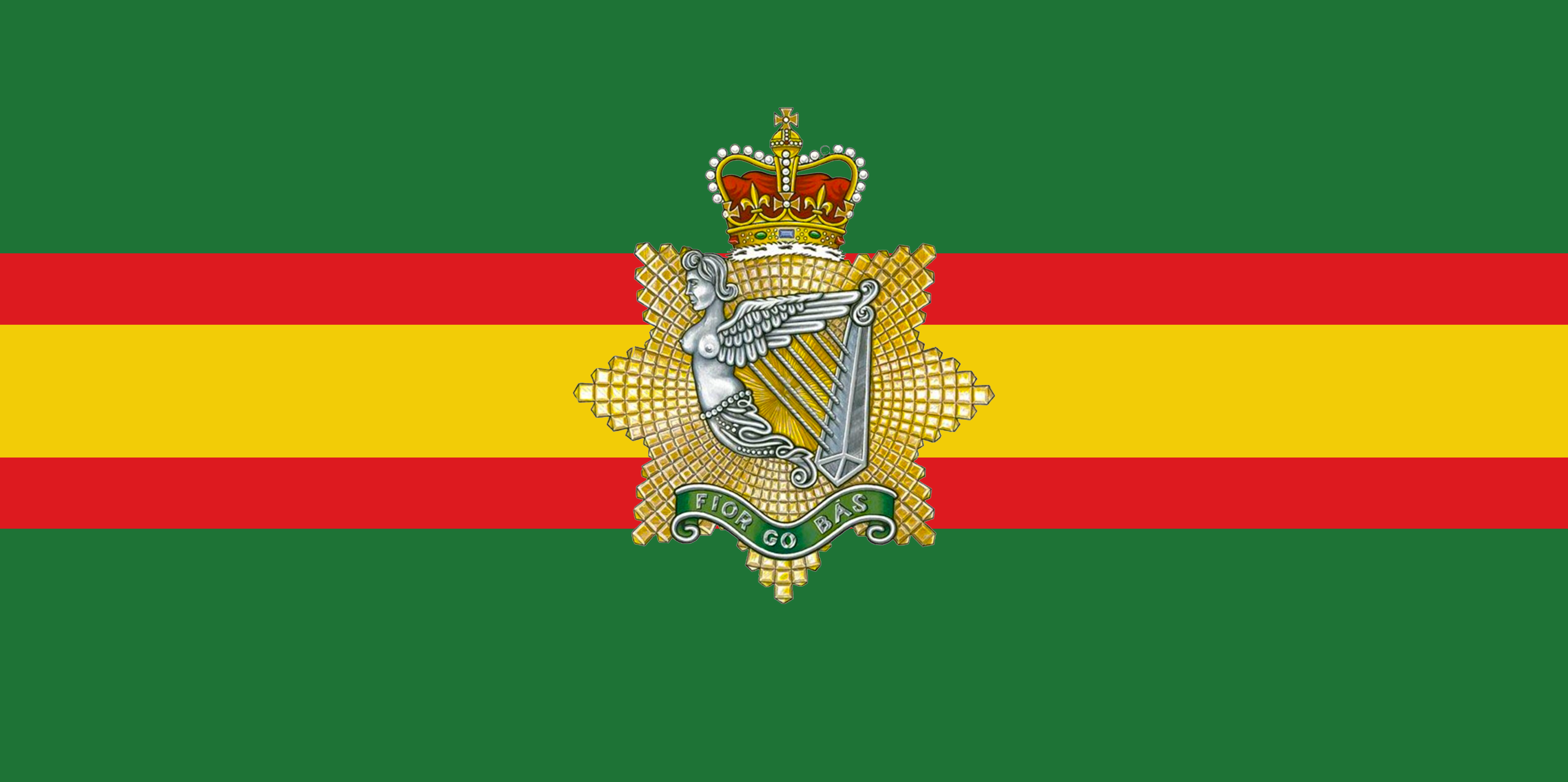
Regimental camp flag

=== Irish Regiment of Canada ===
- Authorized on 15 October 1915 as the 110th Irish Regiment
- Redesignated 1 May 1920 as The Irish Regiment
- Redesignated 1 September 1932 as the Irish Regiment of Canada
- Amalgamated 15 December 1936 with the headquarters and A Company of the 1st Machine Gun Battalion, CMGC, and redesignated as the Irish Regiment of Canada (Machine Gun)
- Redesignated 12 August 1940 as the Irish Regiment of Canada
- Redesignated 7 November 1940 as the 2nd (Reserve) Battalion, the Irish Regiment of Canada
- Redesignated 31 January 1946 the Irish Regiment of Canada
- Reduced to nil strength and transferred to the Supplementary Order of Battle 10 February 1965
- Amalgamated 15 March 1965 with the 58th (Sudbury) Field Artillery Regiment, RCA. The artillery unit was converted to infantry and redesignated as the 2nd Battalion, the Irish Regiment of Canada (Sudbury), with the unit transferred to the Supplementary Order of Battle being automatically redesignated as the 1st Battalion, the Irish Regiment of Canada.

=== 1st Machine Gun Battalion, CMGC ===
- Originated 1 June 1919 in Toronto, Ontario as the 1st Machine Gun Brigade, CMGC
- Redesignated 15 September 1924 as the 1st Machine Gun Battalion, CMGC
- Amalgamated 15 December 1936 with the Irish Regiment of Canada

=== 58th (Sudbury) Field Artillery Regiment, RCA ===
- Originated 1 April 1946 in Sudbury, Ontario as the 49th Heavy Anti-Aircraft Regiment, RCA
- Redesignated 3 July 1947 as the 58th Light Anti-Aircraft Regiment, RCA
- Redesignated 15 March 1948 as the 58th (Sudbury) Light Anti-Aircraft Regiment, RCA
- Redesignated 12 April 1960 as the 58th (Sudbury) Light Anti-Aircraft Artillery Regiment, RCA
- Redesignated 10 December 1962 as the 58th (Sudbury) Field Artillery Regiment, RCA
- Converted 15 March 1965 to infantry and amalgamated with the 173rd Field Battery, RCA, the 174th Field Battery, RCA, the 175th Field Battery, RCA and the Irish Regiment of Canada and redesignated as the 2nd Battalion, the Irish Regiment of Canada (Sudbury)

=== 173rd Field Battery, RCA ===
- Originated 2 February 1920 in Sudbury, Ontario as the 30th Battery, CFA
- Redesignated 1 July 1925 as the 30th Field Battery, CA
- Redesignated 3 June 1935 as the 30th Field Battery, RCA
- Redesignated 7 November 1940 as the 30th (Reserve) Field Battery, RCA
- Redesignated 15 May 1943 as the 30th (Reserve) Anti-Aircraft Battery (Type 2H), RCA
- Redesignated 1 April 1946 as the 30th Heavy Anti-Aircraft Battery, RCA
- Redesignated 3 July 1947 as the 173rd Light Anti-Aircraft Battery, RCA
- Redesignated 10 December 1962 as the 173rd Field Battery, RCA
- Converted 15 March 1965 to infantry and amalgamated with the Irish Regiment of Canada

=== 174th Field Battery, RCA ===
- Redesignated 3 July 1947 as the 174th Light Anti-Aircraft Battery, RCA
- Redesignated 10 December 1962 as the 174th Field Battery, RCA
- Converted 15 March 1965 to infantry and amalgamated with the Irish Regiment of Canada

=== 175th Field Battery, RCA ===
- Originated 2 February 1920 in Sudbury, Ontario as the 53rd Battery, CFA
- Redesignated 1 July 1925 as the 53rd Field Battery, CA
- Redesignated 3 June 1935 as the 53rd Field Battery, RCA
- Redesignated 7 November 1940 as the 53rd (Reserve) Field Battery, RCA
- Redesignated 15 May 1943 as the 53rd (Reserve) Anti-Aircraft Battery (Type 2H), RCA
- Redesignated 1 April 1946 as the 153rd Heavy Anti-Aircraft Battery, RCA
- Redesignated 3 July 1947 as the 175th Light Anti-Aircraft Battery, RCA
- Redesignated 10 December 1962 as the 175th Field Battery, RCA
- Converted 15 March 1965 to infantry and amalgamated with the Irish Regiment of Canada

=== Lineage chart ===
Lineage chart

1915	Regt authorized
1916	180th "Overseas" Bn, CEF	110th Irish Regt	208th "Overseas" Bn, CEF
1917	Absorbed by 3rd Reserve Bn
1918	Absorbed by 2nd and 8th Reserve Bn	1st Bn, CMGC, CEF
1919	1st MG Bde, CMGC
1920	1st Bn (180th Bn, CEF), The Irish Regt	2nd Bn (208th Bn, CEF), (Note: Reserve) The Irish Regt	Disbanded
1924	1st MG Bn, CMGC
1932	1st Bn (180th Bn, CEF), The Irish Regt of Canada	2nd Bn (208th Bn, CEF), The Irish Regt of Canada
1936	Disbanded
1936	The Irish Regt of Canada (MG)
1940	The Irish Regt of Canada (MG), CASF
1940	The Irish Regt of Canada, CASF	The Irish Regt of Canada
1940	1st Bn, The Irish Regt of Canada, CASF	2nd (Reserve) Bn, The Irish Regt of Canada
1946	Disbanded	The Irish Regt of Canada	49th HAA Regt, RCA
1947	58th LAA Regt, RCA
1948	58th (Sudbury) LAA Regt, RCA
1960	58th (Sudbury) LAA Arty Regt, RCA
1962	58th (Sudbury) Fd Arty Regt, RCA
1965	1st Bn, (Note: Supplementary Order of Battle) The Irish Regt of Canada	2nd Bn, The Irish Regt of Canada (Sudbury)
1975	1st Bn, Irish Regt of Canada	2nd Bn, Irish Regt of Canada

== Perpetuations ==
=== Great War perpetuations ===
- 180th Battalion (Sportsmen), CEF
- 208th Battalion (Canadian Irish), CEF
- 1st Battalion, Canadian Machine Gun Corps, CEF
- 30th Field Battery, Canadian Field Artillery, CEF
- 53rd Field Battery, CFA, CEF

== Operational history ==
=== Great War ===
The 180th Battalion (Sportsmen), CEF was authorized on 15 July 1916 and embarked for Great Britain on 14 November 1916. There its personnel were absorbed by the 3rd Reserve Battalion, CEF on 6 January 1917 to provide reinforcements to the Canadian Corps in the field. The battalion disbanded on 21 May 1917.

The 208th Battalion (Canadian Irish), CEF was authorized on 15 July 1916 and embarked for Great Britain on 3 May 1917. There it provided reinforcements to the Canadian Corps in the field until its personnel were absorbed by the 2nd Reserve Battalion, CEF and the 8th Reserve Battalion, CEF on 3 January 1918. The battalion disbanded on 15 September 1920.

The 1st Battalion, CMGC, CEF, which was organized in France on 27 March 1918 from the Brigade machine gun companies of the 1st Canadian Division. It provided machine gun support to the 1st Canadian Division in France and Flanders until the end of the war. The battalion was disbanded on 15 November 1920.

The 30th Field Battery, CFA, CEF, was authorized on 20 April 1915 and embarked for Great Britain on 5 February 1916. The battery disembarked in France on 14 July 1916, where it provided field artillery support as part of the 8th Army Brigade, CFA, CEF in France and Flanders until the end of the war. The battery disbanded on 1 November 1920.

The 53rd Field Battery, CFA, CEF was authorized on 15 July 1916 as the 53rd "Overseas" Depot Battery, CEF', and embarked for Great Britain on 19 September 1916. The battery disembarked in France on 21 August 1917, where it provided field artillery support as part of the 13th Brigade, CFA, CEF, in France and Flanders until the end of the war. The battery disbanded on 1 November 1920.

=== Second World War ===
Details from the regiment were placed on service on 26 August 1939 and then placed on active service on 1 September 1939 as the Irish Regiment of Canada (Machine Gun), CASF (Details), for local protection duties. Those details called out on active service disbanded on 31 December 1940.

The regiment mobilized the Irish Regiment of Canada (Machine Gun), CASF for active service on 24 May 1940. It was redesignated as the Irish Regiment of Canada, CASF on 12 August 1940; and as the 1st Battalion, The Irish Regiment of Canada, CASF on 7 November 1940. It embarked for Great Britain on 28 October 1942. It landed in mainland Italy on 10 November 1943, as part of the 11th Infantry Brigade, 5th Canadian Armoured Division. Between 20 and 27 February 1945, the battalion moved with the I Canadian Corps to North-West Europe as part of Operation Goldflake, where it fought until the end of the war. The overseas battalion disbanded on 31 January 1946.

The 53rd Field Battery mobilized as the 53rd Field Battery, RCA, CASF on 1 September 1939. On 1 June 1940 it amalgamated with the 26th Field Battery, RCA, CASF and was redesignated as the 26th/53rd Field Battery, RCA, CASF. On 1 January 1941 this amalgamation ceased and it was redesignated as the 53rd Field Battery, RCA, CASF and as the 53rd Light Anti-Aircraft Battery, RCA, CASF the same day. It provided light antiaircraft artillery support as part of the 11th Light Anti-Aircraft Regiment, RCA, CASF, in Great Britain. The overseas battery disbanded on 1 March 1944.

=== Afghanistan ===
The regiment contributed an aggregate of more than 20% of its authorized strength to the various Task Forces which served in Afghanistan between 2002 and 2014.

== Alliances ==
- United Kingdom - The Royal Irish Regiment (27th (Inniskilling) 83rd, 87th and Ulster Defence Regiment)

== Battle honours ==
Regimental colour of the 2nd Battalion

In the list below, battle honours in small capitals are for large operations and campaigns and those in lowercase are for more specific battles. Bold type indicates honours authorized to be emblazoned on regimental colours.

First World War

- **Arras, 1917, '18**
- **Hill 70**
- **Ypres, 1917**
- **Amiens**
- **Scarpe, 1918**
- **Drocourt–Quéant**
- **Hindenburg Line**
- **Canal du Nord**
- **Pursuit to Mons**
- **France and Flanders, 1917–18**

Second World War

- **Liri Valley**
- **Melfa Crossing**
- **Gothic Line**
- **Montecchio**
- **Coriano**
- **Lamone Crossing**
- Fosso Munio
- Conventello–Comacchio
- **Italy, 1943–1945**
- **IJsselmeer**
- **Delfzijl Pocket**
- **North-West Europe, 1945**

South-West Asia

- Afghanistan

== Irish Regiment of Canada Regimental Museum ==
Irish Regiment of Canada Regimental Museum
- Location: Sudbury Armoury, 333 Riverside Drive, Sudbury, Ontario, Canada
- Type: Regimental Museum

The museum provides a place to exhibit the Irish Regiment of Canada memorabilia dating from the First World War. It provides a venue for veterans and others who wish to donate service memorabilia for exposition. The museum is a venue to exhibit service memorabilia after the First World War including the United Nations Operations – Korea – 1950-1953 and peacekeeping operations. It is a venue to educate Northern Ontario citizens about the Canadian Forces, in particular the local militia units, to appreciate their roles and the necessity to support them.

== Order of precedence ==
Preceded by The Royal Montreal Regiment	2nd Battalion, The Irish Regiment of Canada	Succeeded by The Toronto Scottish Regiment (Queen Elizabeth The Queen Mother's Own)

== Media ==
- The Story of the Irish Regiment of Canada 1939-1945 by Major Gordon Wood

== Notable members ==
- Major Alan Cockeram
- Flying officer David Griffin, public relations officer for the Royal Canadian Air Force
- Major General Herb Petras

== See also ==
- Organization of Military Museums of Canada
