= Royal Infantry Corps =

Royal Infantry Corps may refer to:

- Royal Australian Infantry Corps
- Royal Canadian Infantry Corps
