= 110th Battalion (Perth), CEF =

The 110th Battalion (Perth), CEF, was an infantry battalion of the Great War Canadian Expeditionary Force. The 110th Battalion was authorized on 22 December 1915 and embarked for Great Britain on 31 October 1916, where, on 2 January 1917, its personnel were absorbed by the 8th Reserve Battalion, CEF to provide reinforcements for the Canadian Corps in the field. The battalion disbanded on 17 July 1917

The 110th Battalion recruited in Perth County, Ontario and was mobilized at Stratford, Ontario.

The battalion was commanded by Lt.-Col. J.L. Youngs from 31 October 1916 to 2 January 1917.

The battalion was awarded the battle honour THE GREAT WAR 1916-17.

The 110th Battalion (Perth), CEF, is perpetuated by The Perth Regiment which is currently on the Supplementary Order of Battle.

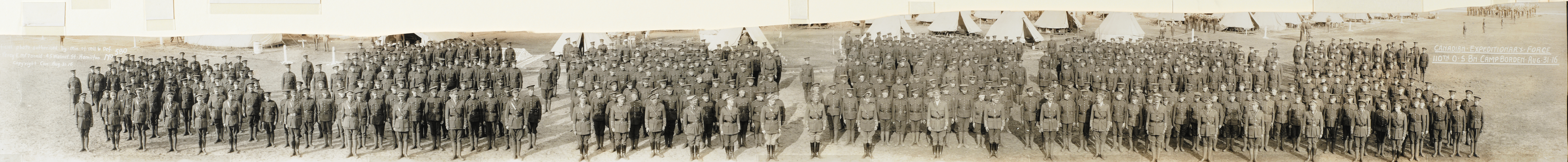

== Sources ==
Canadian Expeditionary Force 1914–1919 by Col. G.W.L. Nicholson, CD, Queen's Printer, Ottawa, Ontario, 1962
