= Royal Canadian Infantry Corps =

Infantry branch of the Canadian Army

- Badge of the Royal Canadian Infantry Corps
- Active: 2 September 1942–present (21 December 1883 as the Infantry School Corps)
- Country: Canada
- Branch: Canadian Army
- Type: Personnel branch
- Role: Infantry
- Size: 9 Regular Force battalions, 51 Reserve Force battalions
- Motto: Ducimus (Latin for 'We lead')
- Colours: Red and white
- March: "The Canadian Infantryman"
- Anniversaries: Founded 2 September 1942
- Engagements: North-West Rebellion; Second Boer War; First World War; Second World War; Korean War; War in Afghanistan

The Royal Canadian Infantry Corps (French: Corps d'infanterie royal canadien) is the infantry corps of the Canadian Army and includes regular and reserve force regiments.

Originally formed as the Canadian Infantry Corps on 2 September 1942 to encompass all existing infantry regiments, including regiments of foot guards, in the Canadian Army. The corps was granted its "royal" designation in 1947 and was designated Royal Canadian Infantry Corps 30 April 1947, to be redesignated The Royal Canadian Infantry Corps 22 March 1948, and revert to Royal Canadian Infantry Corps 17 February 1964.

The badge of the Royal Canadian Infantry Corps consists of Argent three maple leaves conjoined on one stem within an annulus Gules fimbriated and inscribed INFANTRY • INFANTERIE in letters Or, the whole ensigned by the Royal Crown proper set above a scroll Or inscribed with the Motto in letters Sable and surmounted by two rifles in saltire Or. The three maple leaves conjoined on one stem, taken from the Royal Arms of Canada, represent service to Canada, and the Crown, service to the sovereign. The crossed rifles denote infantry and have been used in badges of infantry units as well as of the officer cadet programme. Red and white are the national colours of Canada. "INFANTRY" and "INFANTERIE" are a form of the bilingual branch title and "DUCIMUS" is the motto of the corps.

In 1968, with the unification of the Canadian Army into the Canadian Armed Forces, the name of the Royal Canadian Infantry Corps was changed to simply the "Infantry Branch". As of April 2013, the traditional designation "Royal Canadian Infantry Corps" has been officially restored. Today, the administration and training of both the regular and reserve infantry that form part of the Canadian Army is the responsibility of the Infantry School (French: Ecole d'infanterie), which runs officer classification courses as well as NCO and Warrant Officer trades training at CFB Gagetown.

== Tasks ==
- To destroy the enemy in close combat
- To defend a position by the holding of ground
- To fight as covering force troops
- To act as all or part of a reserve to counter-attack or block
- To participate in airmobile, airborne and amphibious operations
- To establish surveillance and conduct patrols
- To conduct security tasks, including rear area security
- To exploit the effects of nuclear, biological and chemical weapons

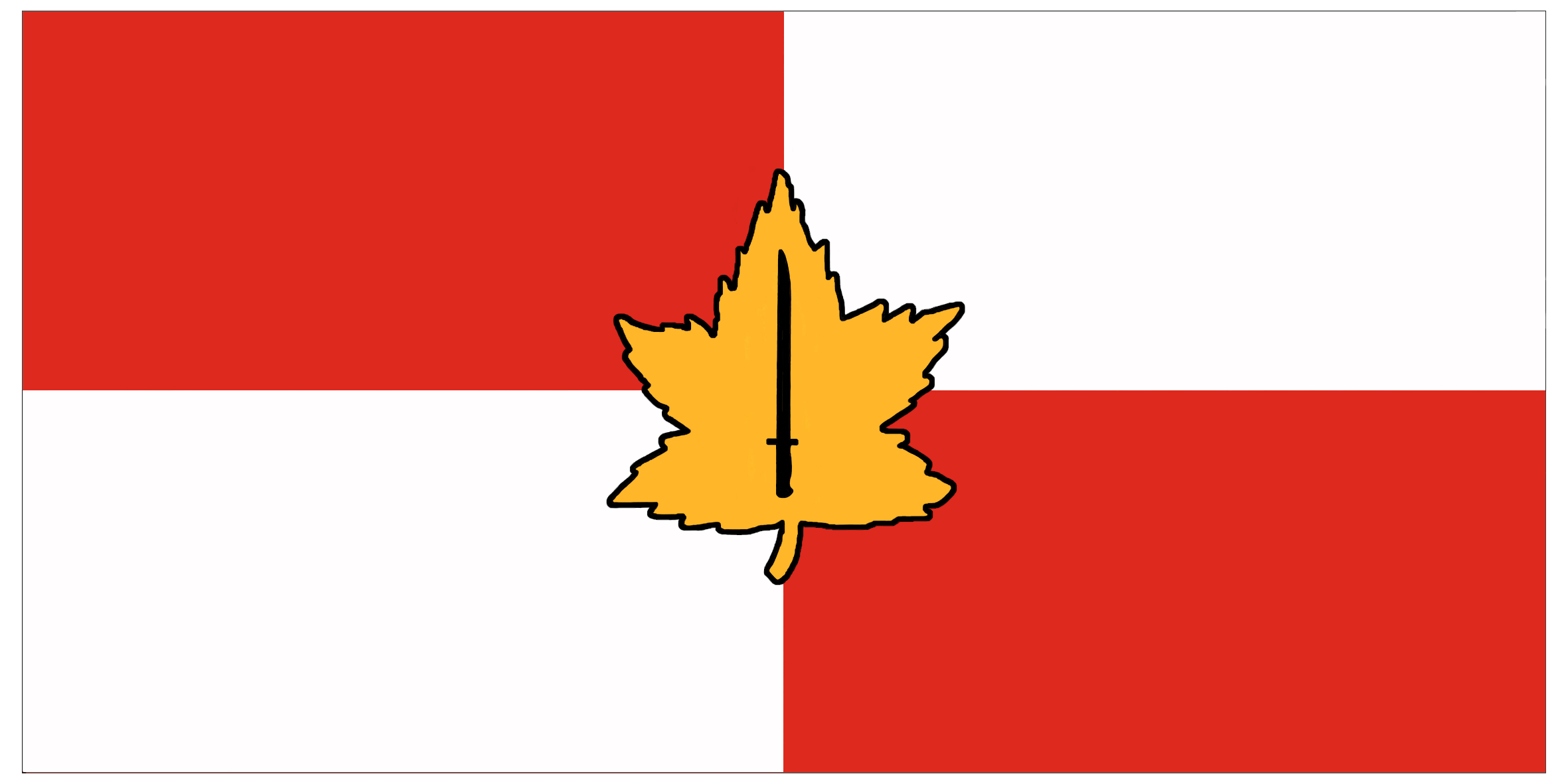
The camp flag of the Infantry Corps.

== Regular Force ==
The 3rd Battalion Royal Canadian Regiment is the sole airmobile battalion of the Regular Force. The two other regular force regiments both retain a parachute company in their respective 3rd battalions.

Order of precedence	Regiment	Subunits	Headquarters	Role
1	Royal Canadian Regiment	1st Battalion	CFB Petawawa	mechanized infantry
1	Royal Canadian Regiment	2nd Battalion	CFB Gagetown	mechanized infantry
1	Royal Canadian Regiment	3rd Battalion	CFB Petawawa	light infantry/airmobile (two parachute companies, air assault company, mountain operations company)
2	Princess Patricia's Canadian Light Infantry	1st Battalion	CFB Edmonton	mechanized infantry
2	Princess Patricia's Canadian Light Infantry	2nd Battalion	CFB Shilo	mechanized infantry
2	Princess Patricia's Canadian Light Infantry	3rd Battalion	CFB Edmonton	light infantry (parachute company, air assault company, mountain operations company)
3	Royal 22^{e} Régiment	1st Battalion	CFB Valcartier	mechanized infantry
3	Royal 22^{e} Régiment	2nd Battalion	Quebec City	mechanized infantry
3	Royal 22^{e} Régiment	3rd Battalion	CFB Valcartier	light infantry (parachute company, air assault company, mountain operations company)

After the Second World War the infantry was expanded to meet Canada's global responsibilities as part of NATO. Initially, the militia regiments provided men to a number of composite battalions:

Battalion	Formed	Disbanded
1st Canadian Infantry Battalion	1951	1953
2nd Canadian Infantry Battalion	1952	1953
1st Canadian Rifle Battalion	1951	1953
2nd Canadian Rifle Battalion	1952	1953
1st Canadian Highland Battalion	1951	1953
2nd Canadian Highland Battalion	1952	1953

In 1953 it was decided that the composite battalions would be regimented. The two "infantry" battalions were amalgamated with the 3rd battalions of both the Royal Canadian Regiment and Princess Patricia's Canadian Light Infantry to form a new, four-battalion regiment of foot guards, The Canadian Guards. The "rifle" and "Highland" battalions were regimented by forming Regular Force units of the senior rifle and Highland regiments of the militia, The Queen's Own Rifles of Canada and the Black Watch (Royal Highland Regiment) of Canada.

A further infantry regiment, the Canadian Airborne Regiment, was formed in 1968 as a new airmobile rapid-reaction unit. Although a new formation, its soldiers were primarily recruited from the then existing infantry regiments of the Canadian Army.

Regiment	Subunits	Formed	Disbanded	Former unit
Canadian Guards	1st Battalion	1953	1968	3rd Battalion, Royal Canadian Regiment (Note: Personnel and equipment were transferred from a disbanded unit to a newly formed unit)
Canadian Guards	2nd Battalion	1953	1970	3rd Battalion, Princess Patricia's Canadian Light Infantry
Canadian Guards	3rd Battalion	1953	1957	1st Canadian Infantry Battalion (Note: The unit was redesignated)
Canadian Guards	4th Battalion	1953	1957	2nd Canadian Infantry Battalion
Queen's Own Rifles of Canada	1st Battalion	1953	1970	1st Canadian Rifle Battalion
Queen's Own Rifles of Canada	2nd Battalion	1953	1968	2nd Canadian Rifle Battalion
Black Watch (Royal Highland Regiment) of Canada	1st Battalion	1953	1970	1st Canadian Highland Battalion
Black Watch (Royal Highland Regiment) of Canada	2nd Battalion	1953	1970	2nd Canadian Highland Battalion
Canadian Airborne Regiment	1st Commando	1968	1995	N/A
Canadian Airborne Regiment	2nd Commando	1968	1995	N/A
Canadian Airborne Regiment	3rd (Mechanized) Commando (Note: Mechanized infantry battalion formed to serve as part of Canada's resident forces in Germany)	1970	1977	N/A
Canadian Airborne Regiment	3rd Commando	1979	1995	N/A

== Reserve ==
Order of precedence	Regiment	Headquarters	Role
1	Governor General's Foot Guards	Ottawa, Ontario	Light infantry
2	Canadian Grenadier Guards	Montreal, Quebec	Light infantry
3	Queen's Own Rifles of Canada	Toronto, Ontario	Light infantry
4	Black Watch (Royal Highland Regiment) of Canada	Montreal, Quebec	Light infantry
5	Voltigeurs de Québec	Quebec City, Quebec	Light infantry
6	Royal Regiment of Canada	Toronto, Ontario	Light infantry
7	Royal Hamilton Light Infantry (Wentworth Regiment)	Hamilton, Ontario	Light infantry
8	Princess of Wales' Own Regiment	Kingston, Ontario	Light infantry
9	Hastings and Prince Edward Regiment	Belleville, Ontario	Light infantry
10	Lincoln and Welland Regiment	St. Catharines, Ontario	Light infantry
11	4th Battalion, Royal Canadian Regiment	London, Ontario	Light infantry
12	Royal Highland Fusiliers of Canada	Cambridge and Kitchener, Ontario	Light infantry
13	Grey and Simcoe Foresters	Barrie, Ontario	Light infantry
14	Lorne Scots (Peel, Dufferin and Halton Regiment)	Brampton, Ontario	Light infantry
15	Brockville Rifles	Brockville, Ontario	Light infantry
16	Stormont, Dundas and Glengarry Highlanders	Cornwall, Ontario	Light infantry
17	Fusiliers du S^{t}-Laurent	Rimouski, Quebec	Light infantry
18	Régiment de la Chaudière	Lévis, Quebec	Light infantry
19	4th Battalion, Royal 22^{e} Régiment (Châteauguay)	Laval, Quebec	Light infantry
19	6th Battalion, Royal 22^{e} Régiment	Saint-Hyacinthe, Quebec	Light infantry
20	Fusiliers Mont-Royal	Montreal, Quebec	Light infantry
21	Princess Louise Fusiliers	Halifax, Nova Scotia	Light infantry
22	Royal New Brunswick Regiment (Carleton & York)	Fredericton, New Brunswick	Light infantry
23	West Nova Scotia Regiment	Aldershot, Nova Scotia	Light infantry
24	North Shore (New Brunswick) Regiment	Bathurst, New Brunswick	Light infantry
25	1st Battalion, Nova Scotia Highlanders (North)	Truro, Nova Scotia	Light infantry
26	Régiment de Maisonneuve	Montreal, Quebec	Light infantry
27	Cameron Highlanders of Ottawa	Ottawa, Ontario	Light infantry
28	Royal Winnipeg Rifles	Winnipeg, Manitoba	Light infantry
29	Essex and Kent Scottish	Windsor, Ontario	Light infantry
30	48th Highlanders of Canada	Toronto, Ontario	Light infantry
31	Régiment du Saguenay	Saguenay, Quebec	Light infantry
32	Cape Breton Highlanders	Sydney, Nova Scotia	Light infantry
33	Algonquin Regiment (Northern Pioneers)	North Bay, Ontario	Light infantry
34	Argyll and Sutherland Highlanders of Canada (Princess Louise's)	Hamilton, Ontario	Light infantry
35	Lake Superior Scottish Regiment	Thunder Bay, Ontario	Light infantry
36	North Saskatchewan Regiment	Saskatoon, Saskatchewan	Light infantry
37	Royal Regina Rifles	Regina, Saskatchewan	Light infantry
38	Rocky Mountain Rangers	Kamloops, British Columbia	Light infantry
39	Loyal Edmonton Regiment	Edmonton, Alberta	Light infantry
40	Queen's Own Cameron Highlanders of Canada	Winnipeg, Manitoba	Light infantry
41	Royal Westminster Regiment	New Westminster, British Columbia	Light infantry
42	Calgary Highlanders (10th Canadians)	Calgary, Alberta	Light infantry
43	Fusiliers de Sherbrooke	Sherbrooke, Quebec	Light infantry
44	Seaforth Highlanders of Canada	Vancouver, British Columbia	Light infantry
45	Canadian Scottish Regiment (Princess Mary's)	Victoria, British Columbia	Light infantry
46	Royal Montreal Regiment	Westmount, Quebec	Light infantry
47	2nd Battalion, Irish Regiment of Canada	Sudbury, Ontario	Light infantry
48	Toronto Scottish Regiment (Queen Elizabeth The Queen Mother's Own)	Toronto, Ontario	Light infantry
49	1st Battalion, Royal Newfoundland Regiment	St. John's, Newfoundland and Labrador	Light infantry
49	2nd Battalion, Royal Newfoundland Regiment	Corner Brook, Newfoundland and Labrador	Light infantry

== Supplementary Order of Battle ==
Regiments on the Supplementary Order of Battle legally exist but have no personnel or materiel.

Regiment	Formed	To SOB	Headquarters
Canadian Guards	1951	1970	Camp Petawawa
Victoria Rifles of Canada	1862	1965	Montreal, Quebec
Régiment de Joliette	1871	1964	Joliette, Quebec
Perth Regiment	1866	1965	Stratford, Ontario
South Saskatchewan Regiment	1905	1968	Estevan, Saskatchewan
Winnipeg Grenadiers	1908	1965	Winnipeg, Manitoba
1st Battalion, Irish Regiment of Canada	1915	1965	Toronto, Ontario
Yukon Regiment	1962	1968	Whitehorse, Yukon

== Order of precedence ==
Preceded by Communications and Electronics Branch	Royal Canadian Infantry Corps	Succeeded by Air Operations Branch

== See also ==
- List of Canadian organizations with royal patronage
- List of infantry weapons and equipment of the Canadian military
- List of equipment of the Canadian Army
- Monarchy of Canada
