= Perth Regiment =

Former Canadian infantry regiment

The Perth Regiment
- Active: 1866–1965
- Country: Canada
- Branch: Canadian Militia (1866–1940); Canadian Army (1940–1965)
- Type: Line Infantry
- Role: Infantry
- Size: One battalion
- Part of: Non-Permanent Active Militia (1866–1940); Royal Canadian Infantry Corps (1942–1965)
- Garrison/HQ: Stratford, Ontario
- Mottos: Audax et cautus (Latin for 'bold and wary')
- Colours: Facing colour green
- March: "Kenmure's On and Awa"
- Engagements: Fenian Raids; First World War; Second World War
- Battle honours: See #Battle honours

Insignia
- Tartan
- Blazer

The Perth Regiment was an infantry regiment of the Canadian Army. It is currently on the Supplementary Order of Battle. The unit was first established in 1866. It fought in the Allied Italian campaign from 1943 to 1945. The regiment was reduced to zero strength in 1965.

== Lineage ==
Lineage of The Perth Regiment:

=== The Perth Regiment (Overseas Battalion) ===
- Originated 22 Dec as 110th (Overseas) Battalion, CEF
- Disbanded 17 Jul 1917
- Originated 1 Sep 1939 as The Perth Regiment (Machine Gun), CASF
- Redesignated 2 Nov 1940 as 1st Battalion, The Perth Regiment (Machine Gun), CASF
- Redesignated 11 Feb 1941 as 1st Battalion, The Perth Regiment (Motor), CASF
- Redesignated 31 Jan 1943 as 1st Battalion, The Perth Regiment, CIC, CASF
- Disbanded 31 Jan 1946

=== The Perth Regiment (Reserve Battalion) ===
- Originated 14 Sep 1866 as 28th (Perth) Battalion of Infantry
- Redesignated 8 May 1900 as 28th Perth Regiment
- Redesignated 29 Mar 1920 as The Perth Regiment
- Amalgamated 15 Dec 1936 with C Company of the 2nd Machine Gun Battalion, CMGC and redesignated as The Perth Regiment (Machine Gun)
- Redesignated 7 Nov 1940 as 2nd (Reserve) Battalion, The Perth Regiment (Machine Gun)
- Redesignated 1 Apr 1941 as 2nd (Reserve) Battalion, The Perth Regiment (Motor)
- Redesignated 1 Apr 1946 as The Perth Regiment
- Amalgamated 1 October 1954 with The Highland Light Infantry of Canada and renamed The Perth and Waterloo Regiment (Highland Light Infantry of Canada)
- Amalgamation ceased 1 April 1957 and resumed as The Perth Regiment
- Assigned to the Supplementary Order of Battle 28 Feb 1965, and reduced to nil strength

=== Lineage chart ===
Lineage chart

1858	Independent infy and rifle coys
1866	28th "Perth Bn of Infy"
1900	28th Perth Regt
1915	110th "Overseas" Bn, CEF
1917	Absorbed by 8th Reserve Bn
1920	1st Bn (110th Bn, CEF), The Perth Regt	2nd Bn, (Note: Reserve order of battle) The Perth Regt
C Coy, 2nd MG Bn, CMGC
1936	Disbanded
1936	The Perth Regt (MG)
1939	The Perth Regt (MG), CASF
1940	1st Bn, The Perth Regt (MG), CASF	2nd (Reserve) Bn, The Perth Regt (MG)
1941	1st Bn, The Perth Regt (Motor), CASF	2nd (Reserve) Bn, The Perth Regt (Motor)
1943	1st Bn, The Perth Regt, CIC, CASF
Highland Light Infy of Canada
1946	Disbanded	The Perth Regt
1954	The Perth and Waterloo Regt (Highland Light Infy of Canada)
1957	The Perth Regt	Highland Light Infy of Canada
1965	Supplementary Order of Battle

== Perpetuations ==
- 110th Battalion (Perth), CEF

== History ==
=== Early history ===
In 1838, the Third Regiment of Huron was organized in the territory which is now the south part of Perth County, Ontario. This was a paper organization of the compulsory militia, to which every able-bodied male citizen in theory belonged. It did not have equipment, did not train, and while it continued to exist after the voluntary militia was formed, it was distinct from the volunteers.

The Stratford Volunteer Rifle Company was formed in 1856, elected its own officers, and carried on entirely at the expense of its members for two years, before it was officially recognized in 1858.

In response to the Fenian Raids, a temporary battalion-sized composite unit was formed in 1866 at Thorold. It consisted of companies from Stratford, Chatham, Ingersoll, St. Thomas and Guelph.

A general order of the Militia Department of the Province of Canada, dated 14 September 1866 authorized a regimental headquarters. Robert Service of Stratford was promoted to lieutenant-colonel and appointed to command. The Stratford Volunteer Rifle Company became No. 1 Company of the regiment. Other companies were in Listowel and St. Marys.

The principle of Militia units was voluntary service and year-round training while carrying on with civilian life. The Perth Regiment maintained this principle throughout its peacetime service.

=== First World War ===
On 6 August 1914, during events which led to the First World War, details of the regiment were placed on active service for local protection duties.

The Canadian Expeditionary Force (CEF) was organized in 1914 and 1915 using numbered battalions, which had little connection with the existing militia regiments. The 110th Battalion (Perth), CEF was authorized on 22 December 1915. The Perth Regiment recruited the 110th Battalion from Perth county.

The 110th Battalion embarked for Great Britain on 31 October 1916 with a strength of 679 all ranks. On 2 January 1917, personnel of the 110th Battalion were absorbed by the 8th Battalion, CEF to provide reinforcements for the Canadian Corps in the field. The 110th Battalion was disbanded on 17 July 1917.

=== Second World War ===
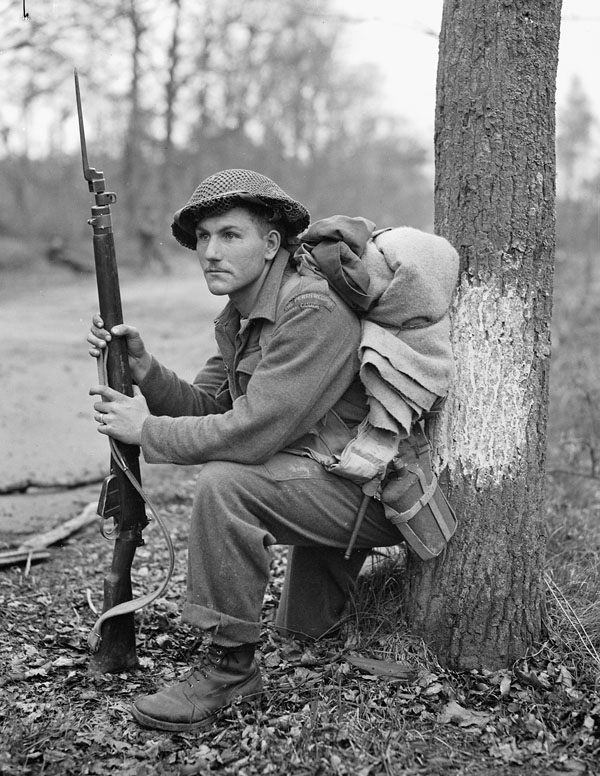
Perth Regiment's Private Earl during the Liberation of Arnhem, April 1945

The 1st Battalion, The Perth Regiment, was mobilized 1 September 1939 for service in World War II. The 1st Battalion embarked for Great Britain on 9 October 1941. It landed in Italy on 8 November 1943, as part of the 11th Infantry Brigade, 5th Canadian Division. The 1st Battalion transferred with the I Canadian Corps to North-West Europe in March 1945, where it fought until the end of the war. It returned home under command of a Perth militia officer, Lt Col MW Andrew and was disbanded on 31 January 1946.

The 2nd (Reserve) Battalion, headquartered in Stratford, was authorized in 1940 and trained recruits for the 1st Battalion.

=== Post War ===
In 1954, as a result of the Kennedy Report on the Reserve Army, this regiment was amalgamated with the Highland Light Infantry of Canada to form the Perth and Waterloo Regiment (Highland Light Infantry of Canada). This was not a successful amalgamation, and in 1957 the two units reverted to their former designations.

In June 1964, the Commission on the Reorganization of the Canadian Army (Militia), commonly called the Suttie Commission, issued its report. The commission proposed the Supplementary Order of Battle to maintain the name of deactivated units and to facilitate reactivation. The commission further recommended that the Perth Regiment be transferred to the Supplementary Order of Battle and that the regiment's personnel be absorbed by 3rd Battalion, the Royal Canadian Regiment (London and Oxford Fusiliers) (now 4th Battalion, the Royal Canadian Regiment).

On 28 February 1965, the Perth Regiment was reduced to nil strength and placed on the Supplementary Order of Battle. At the time it was inactivated, the Perth Regiment consisted of a company in Stratford and a support platoon in St Marys.

Before being moved to the Supplementary Order of Battle, the Perth Regiment its final order of precedence as 16.

== Alliances ==
The Perth Regiment was allied to the Cameronians, the Otago Regiment of New Zealand, 26th Battalion of Australia, and the Witwatersrand Rifles of South Africa.

== Uniform ==
They wore Douglas kilt, green glengarry with green & white diced border, grey sporran with three black points, Douglas hose, and green garter flashes.

== Battle Honours ==
In the list below, battle honours in small capitals were awarded for participation in large operations and campaigns, while those in lowercase indicate honours granted for more specific battles. The battle honours written in bold are emblazoned on the regimental colour.

- **Ypres, 1915**
- **Festubert, 1915**
- **Liri Valley** 25 May – 1 June 1944
- Melfa Crossing 25 May 1944
- Ceprano 27 May 1944
- **Gothic Line** 29 August – 1 September 1944
- Montecchio 30 August 1944
- Point 204 1 September 1944
- **Coriano** 13 September 1944
- **Lamone Crossing** 10–11 December 1944
- **Fosso Munio** 18–20 December 1944
- **Conventello–Comacchio** 2–6 January 1945
- **Italy, 1944–1945**
- **IJsselmeer** 15–18 April 1945
- **Delfzijl Pocket** 23 April – 2 May 1945
- **North-West Europe, 1945**

== Colours ==
The first set of colours was presented by the 28th Regiment Chapter IODE, on 15 June 1927 at Queen's Park Stratford, Ontario.

The second set of colours was presented by the Honourable John Keiller MacKay, Lieutenant Governor of Ontario on 30 June 1962 at Queen's Park Stratford, Ontario.

Both sets of colours are laid up at St. James' Anglican Church, Stratford, Ontario.

== Commanding Officers ==
=== Overseas Battalion ===
- 1915 - LCol JL Youngs
- 1917 - Disbanded
- 1939 - LCol SH McComb, ED
- 1940 - LCol (later Col) GW Little, MVO, OBE, MC, ED
- 1942 - LCol (later BGen) ISH Lind, DSO, ED
- 1943 - LCol (later Col) HET Doucet, OBE, ED (May - Sep)
- 1943 - LCol (later BGen) WS Rutherford, ED
- 1944 - LCol (later BGen) ISH Lind, DSO, ED (Mar - May)
- 1944 - LCol (later BGen) WW Reid, DSO
- 1944 - LCol MW Andrew, DSO, ED, QC
- 1946 - Disbanded

=== Reserve Battalion ===
- 1866 - LCol Robert S Service
- 1872 - LCol WM Smith, VD
- 1881 - LCol D Scot
- 1885 - LColl RS McKnight
- 1898 - LCol AAW Whight
- 1903 - LCol WG Moscrip, VD
- 1908 - LCol GT Cooke
- 1912 - LCol WM Lawrence, VD
- 1920 - LCol JL Youngs, MC
- 1923 - LCol AW Deacon, MC
- 1928 - LCol RM Trow
- 1933 - LCol H Denroche
- 1933 - LCol A Garrod, MC, ED
- 1939 - LCol SH McComb, ED
- 1940 - LCol GDL Rice, ED
- 1944 - Maj TW Orr
- 1946 - LCol John S Whyte, ED
- 1950 - LCol (later B Gen) WH Hempell, CD
- 1954 - LCol EM Hutchinson, CD
- 1959 - LCol FW Savage, CD
- 1962 - LCol EB Burnett, ED
- 1964 - LCol EC Skowby, CD
- 1965 - Assigned to Supplementary Order of battle and reduced to nil strength

== Photo Gallery ==
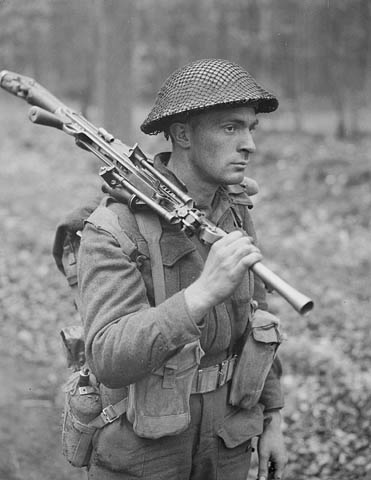
Private H.E. Goddard of The Perth Regiment, carrying a Bren gun while advancing through a forest north of Arnhem, Netherlands, April 1945

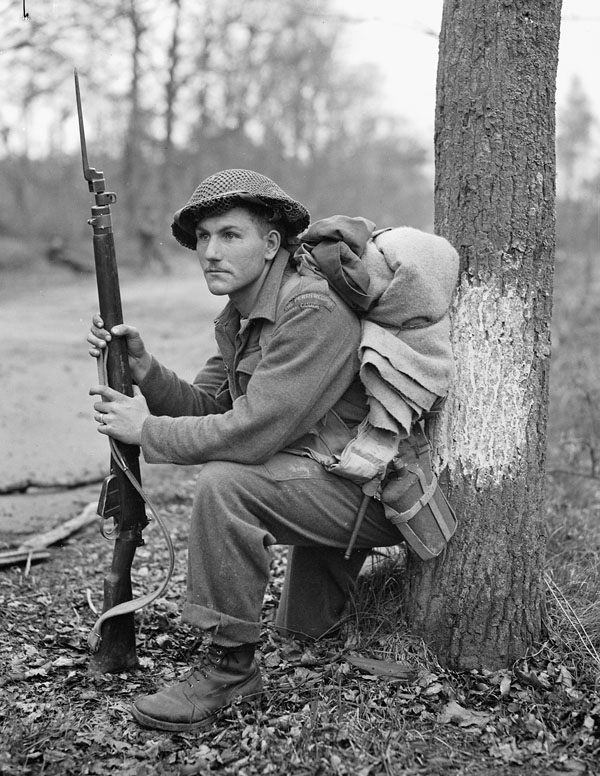
Private K.O. Earl of The Perth Regiment resting in the forest north of Arnhem, Netherlands, April 15, 1945

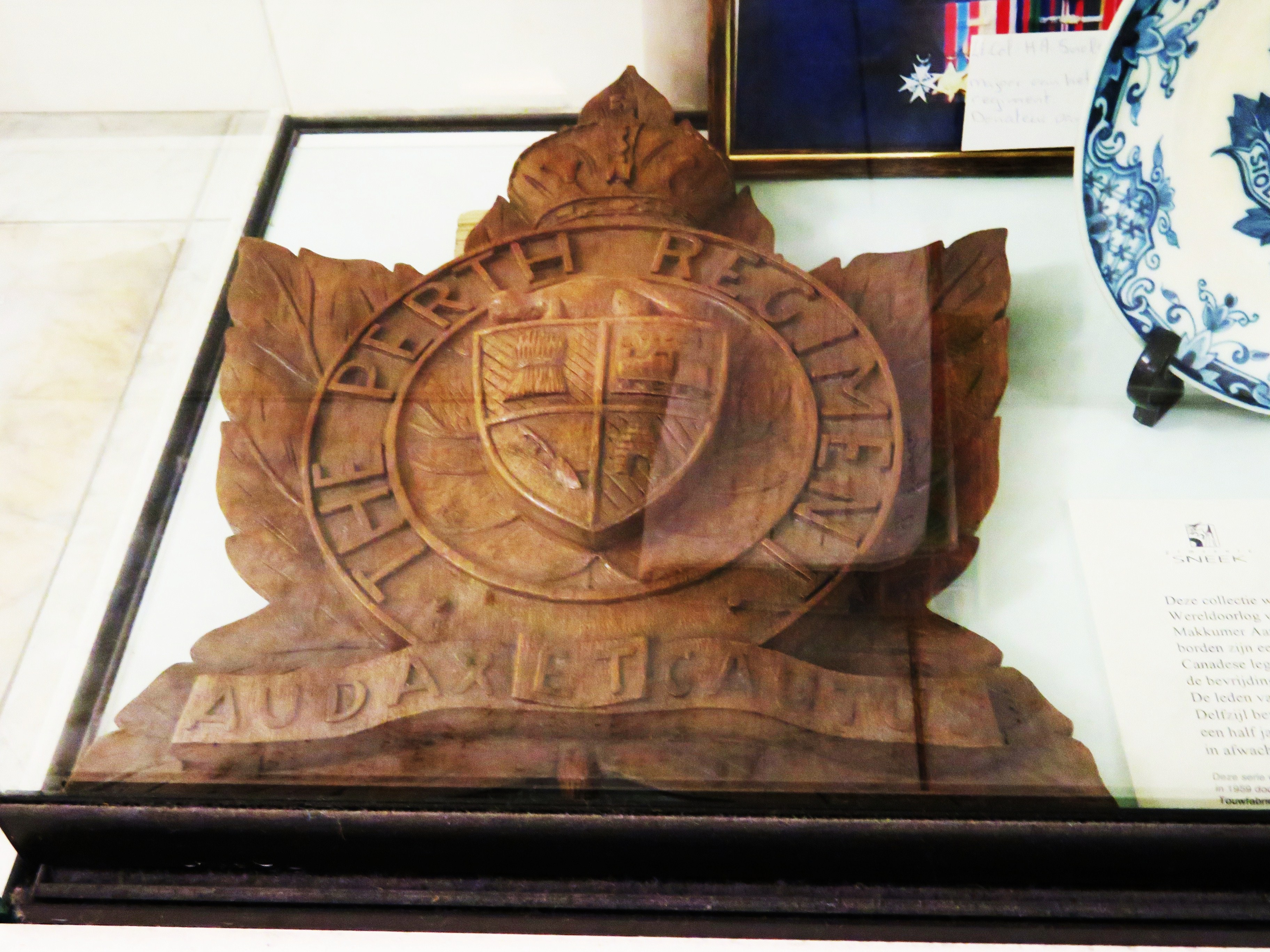
Audax et Cautus

== See also ==
- Canadian-Scottish regiment

== Bibliography ==
- Barnes, R. Money (Major) (1972). The Uniforms and History of the Scottish Regiments. London: Sphere Books Limited.
- Johnston, Stafford (1964). The Fighting Perths: The Story of the First Century in the Life of a Canadian County Regiment. Stratford: B-H Press.
- Scislowski, Stanley & Watt, Gavin K. (1997). Not All of Us Were Brave: Perth Regiment, 11th Infantry Brigade, 5th Canadian Armoured Division. Toronto: Dundurn Press. ISBN 978-1550022988.

Media related to Perth Regiment at Wikimedia Commons
