= 5th (British Columbia) Field Artillery Regiment, RCA =

5th (British Columbia) Field Artillery Regiment, Royal Canadian Artillery
- Active: 12 October 1883-present
- Country: Canada
- Branch: Army
- Type: Field Artillery
- Part of: Royal Regiment of Canadian Artillery
- Garrison/HQ: Victoria, British Columbia
- Mottos: Ubique. Quo fas et gloria ducunt. (Everywhere. Whither right and glory lead)
- March: Quick: British Grenadiers

The 5th (British Columbia) Field Artillery Regiment, Royal Canadian Artillery is a Canadian Army Reserve artillery regiment based at the General Sir Arthur Currie Armoury (formerly the Bay Street Armoury) in Victoria, British Columbia. It is part of the 3rd Canadian Division's 39 Canadian Brigade Group. Although having served for more than 140 years as a field artillery unit, the early history of the regiment is inextricably intertwined with the defences of the naval base at Esquimalt. The regiment is currently equipped with C3 towed 105mm gun-howitzers.

The regiment's band, the Band of the 5th (BC) Field Regiment, is an authorized Primary Reserve band and the only reserve brass-reed band on Vancouver Island.

The regiment's museum is located in the General Sir Arthur Currie Armoury and is open to visitors by appointment.

== Allocated Batteries ==
- 55th Field Battery, RCA
- 56th Field Battery, RCA

The regiment has armouries in Victoria (General Sir Arthur Currie Armoury) and Nanaimo (Brigadier D. R. Sargent Armoury). The 55th and 56th Batteries were redesignated 155 and 156 Batteries on 21 May 2016, based in Victoria and Nanaimo respectively.

== Lineage ==
=== 75th (British Columbia) Heavy Anti-Aircraft Regiment, RCA ===
- Originated 12 October 1883 in Victoria, British Columbia as the British Columbia Provisional Regiment of Garrison Artillery
- Redesignated 7 May 1886 as the British Columbia Brigade of Garrison Artillery
- Redesignated 1 January 1893 as the British Columbia Battalion of Garrison Artillery
- Redesignated 1 January 1895 as the 5th "British Columbia" Battalion of Garrison Artillery
- Redesignated 28 December 1895 as the 5th "British Columbia" Regiment of Garrison Artillery, CA
- Reorganized 1 July 1896 into 1st Battalion and 2nd Battalion, the 5th "British Columbia" Regiment of Garrison Artillery, CA
- 2nd Battalion was detached 1 August 1899, converted to infantry and redesignated the 6th Battalion Rifles (now The British Columbia Regiment (Duke of Connaught's Own) (RCAC)). The 1st Battalion designation was automatically discontinued.
- Redesignated 2 February 1920 as the 5th (British Columbia) Regiment, Canadian Garrison Artillery
- Redesignated 1 July 1925 as the 5th (British Columbia) Coast Brigade, CA
- Redesignated 3 June 1935 as the 5th (British Columbia) Coast Brigade, RCA
- Redesignated 7 November 1940 as the 5th (Reserve) (British Columbia) Coast Brigade, RCA
- Redesignated 1 April 1946 as the 5th (British Columbia) Coast Regiment, RCA
- Redesignated 5 February 1948 as the 5th (British Columbia) Heavy Anti-Aircraft Regiment, RCA
- Redesignated 29 September 1949 as the 75th (British Columbia) Heavy Anti-Aircraft Regiment, RCA
- Amalgamated 17 October 1954 with the 5th (British Columbia) Coast Regiment, RCA, the 120th Heavy Anti-Aircraft Battery, RCA (redesignated as the 120th Harbour Defence Troop, RCA) and the 8th Anti-Aircraft Operations Room, RCA, and redesignated as the 5th West Coast Harbour Defence Battery, RCA
- Redesignated 25 October 1956 as the 5th Independent Medium Battery, RCA, with the 120th Harbour Defence Troop, RCA ceasing its amalgamation
- Redesignated 25 April 1958 as the 5th (British Columbia) Independent Medium Battery, RCA
- Redesignated 12 April 1960 as the 5th (British Columbia) Independent Medium Artillery Battery, RCA
- Redesignated 28 February 1965 as the 5th (British Columbia) Field Battery, RCA and allocated to the 15th Field Artillery Regiment, RCA
- Detached 1 September 1967 from the 15th Field Artillery Regiment, RCA, to operate as an independent battery
- Reorganized 13 September 1991 as a regiment and redesignated as the 5th (British Columbia) Field Artillery Regiment, RCA

=== 5th (British Columbia) Coast Regiment, RCA ===
- Originated 28 October 1948 in Victoria, British Columbia as the British Columbia Coast Regiment, RCA
- Redesignated 29 September 1949 as the 5th (British Columbia) Coast Regiment, RCA
- Amalgamated 17 October 1954 with the 75th (British Columbia) Heavy Anti-Aircraft Regiment, RCA, the 120th Heavy Anti-Aircraft Battery, RCA, and the 8th Anti-Aircraft Operations Room, RCA

=== 8th Anti-Aircraft Operations Room, RCA ===
- Originated 15 December 1936 in Esquimalt, British Columbia as the 17th Fortress Company, RCE
- Converted 1 March 1939 to artillery and redesignated as the 17th Searchlight Battery, RCA (Coastal Defence)
- Redesignated 7 November 1940 as the 17th (Reserve) Searchlight Battery, RCA (CD)
- Redesignated 1 April 1946 as the 8th Anti-Aircraft Gun Operations Room, RCA
- Redesignated 30 June 1951 as the 8th Anti-Aircraft Operations Room, RCA
- Amalgamated 17 October 1954 with the 5th (British Columbia) Coast Regiment, RCA, the 75th (British Columbia) Heavy Anti-Aircraft Regiment, RCA, and the 120th Heavy Anti-Aircraft Battery, RCA

== Perpetuations ==
=== The Great War ===
- 58th Field Battery, CFA, CEF
- 12th Siege Battery CFA CEF

== See also ==
- Military history of Canada
- History of the Canadian Army

Preceded by 3th Field Artillery Regiment, RCA	5th (British Columbia) Field Artillery Regiment, RCA	Succeeded by 6th Field Artillery Regiment, RCA of Royal Canadian Artillery
