= Kennedy Report on the Reserve Army =

Report released in 1954 that reorganized the reserve forces of the Canadian Army

The Kennedy Report on the Reserve Army was a report released in 1954 that reorganized the reserve forces of the Canadian Army. The report was issued by a three-person board, invoked by Chief of the General Staff Guy Simonds, and chaired by Major General Howard K. Kennedy.

The report recommended that the Reserve Army be renamed the Militia, that the command structure be reorganized (divisions and brigades replaced with 26 militia groups), and changes in unit types and armaments (less infantry and artillery, more armour; coastal and air defence units eliminated) be implemented. This was to better provide a partly-trained, partly-equipped force to act as a cadre in the event of a requirement for full-scale mobilization.

The recommendations were generally accepted; the six divisions of the Canadian Army Reserve Force being disbanded and replaced with a larger number of militia groups. The Canadian Army Reserve Force became the Canadian Army (Militia), while the Canadian Army Active Force became the Canadian Army (Regular). Various regiments, such as The North Nova Scotia Highlanders, The Essex Scottish Regiment, The South Alberta Regiment, and The Perth Regiment were dissolved by amalgamation.

The implementation of the report's recommendations significantly reduced the role of the reserve army, thoroughly subordinating it to the regular army. The recommended training requirements were never properly implemented, making it practically impossible for the reserve forces to meet regular-force standards, and there were also challenges with equipment and morale. All this took place in an environment where powerful voices, such as that of Field Marshal Montgomery, were deprecating the importance of augmenting mobilization ability (as opposed to maintaining stronger front-line forces).

== See also ==
- Canadian Army
- Canadian Militia
- Militia Act of 1855
- Otter Commission
- Supplementary Order of Battle
- Unification of the Canadian Armed Forces
