= Yukon Regiment =

The Yukon Regiment
- Active: 19 March 1962 - 15 March 1965
- Country: Canada
- Branch: Canadian Army
- Type: Line Infantry
- Role: Infantry
- Size: One Battalion
- Part of: Royal Canadian Infantry Corps
- Garrison/HQ: Whitehorse, Yukon

The Yukon Regiment was a short lived infantry regiment of the Canadian Army Reserve, currently on the Supplementary Order of Battle. The regiment originated in Whitehorse, Yukon on 19 March 1962, when 'The Yukon Regiment' was authorized to be formed. It was reduced to nil strength and transferred to the Supplementary Order of Battle on 15 June 1968.

== Cap Badge ==
=== Description ===
On a maple leaf Gules the Crest of the Yukon Territory (On a wreath Or and Gules, a husky dog standing on a mount of snow proper) all above a scroll Argent inscribed THE YUKON REGIMENT in letters Sable.

=== Symbolism ===
The badge combines the red maple leaf of Canada, with a widely known official emblem of the Territory.
