= Royal Regiment of Canadian Artillery School =

Principal training institution for the Canadian Armed Forces

The Royal Regiment of Canadian Artillery School
- Active: 1964–present
- Country: Canada
- Branch: Canadian Army
- Type: Training
- Role: Instruction of gunnery
- Part of: Combat Training Centre, Royal Regiment of Canadian Artillery
- Garrison/HQ: CFB Gagetown

Commanders
- Current commander: Lieutenant-Colonel M.W. Riopelle, CD

The Royal Regiment of Canadian Artillery School (RCAS) is the principal training institution for the instruction of gunnery and training of Artillery for the Canadian Armed Forces. The schools instructs all aspects of Artillery such as Gun Line, Air-Defense, Forward Observation, Target Acquisition, and instructor in Gunnery courses.

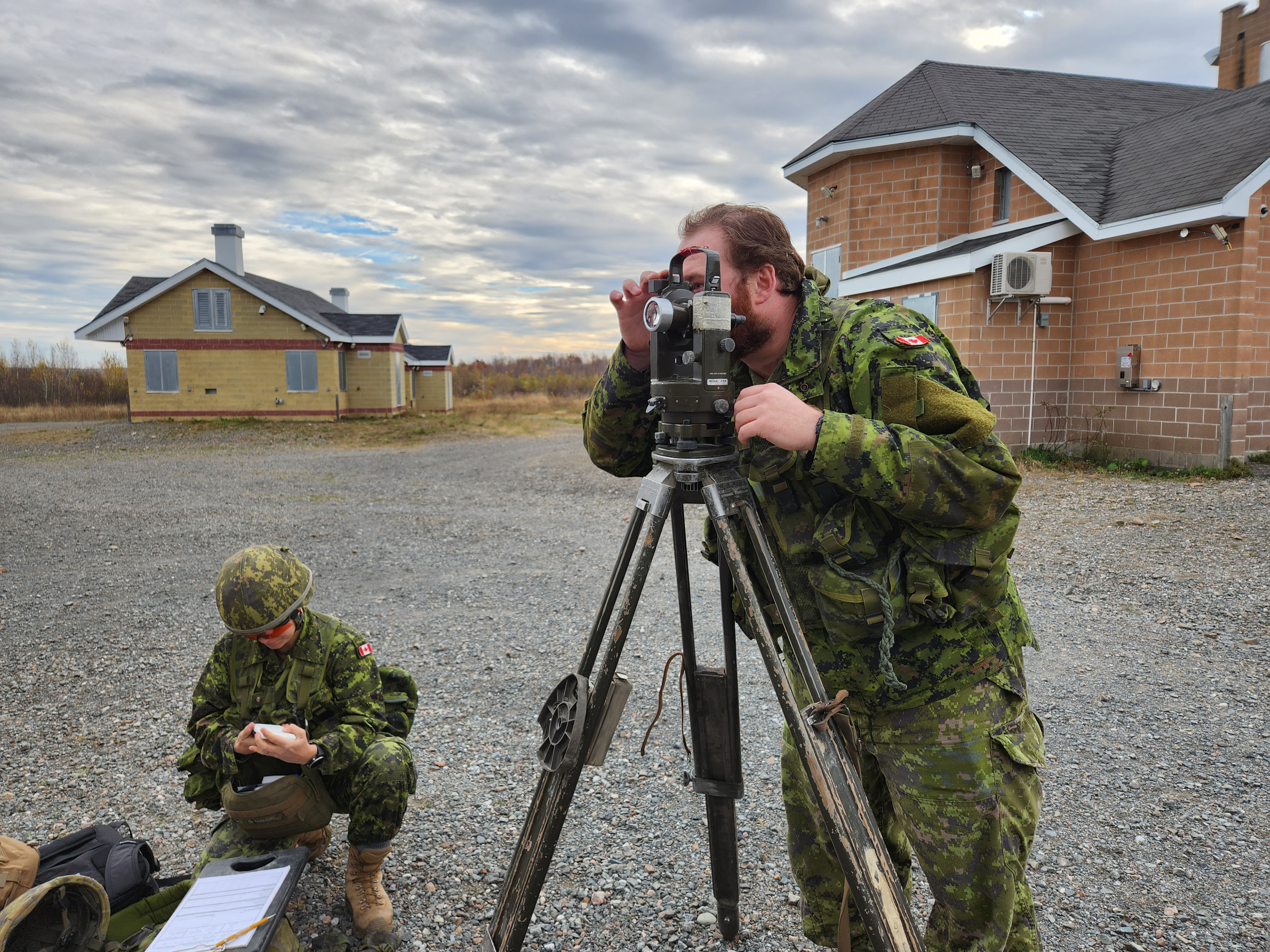
DP1.2 Students practice with survey equipment

== History ==
Training establishments for the Instruction of gunnery have taken place in Canada since before Confederation, with both the French and British using artillery in Canada since the early days of colonisation. In the early days of Artillery instruction there existed multiple schools to teach the militia in gunnery. In 1880, Queen Victoria would grant the Royal prefix to all Canadian gunnery schools

In the 1960s the Artillery school at CFB Shilo would be the only remaining gunnery school in Canada and would eventually be moved to Gagetown during the Unification of the Canadian Armed forces to CFB Gagetown to operate alongside the Infantry and Armoured to form the Combat Arms School, part of the Combat Training Centre.

In 1981, the Royal Canadian Artillery Battle School was formed at CFB Shilo, and in 1985 the Air Defence Artillery School would be formed at CFB Chatham to better train for individual unit tasks.

The current form of the RCAS would be created as a result of an amalgamation of both the Field and Air Defense Artillery Schools in 1996, to form the Royal Canadian School of Artillery (RCAS), later renamed the Royal Regiment of Canadian Artillery School (RRCAS).

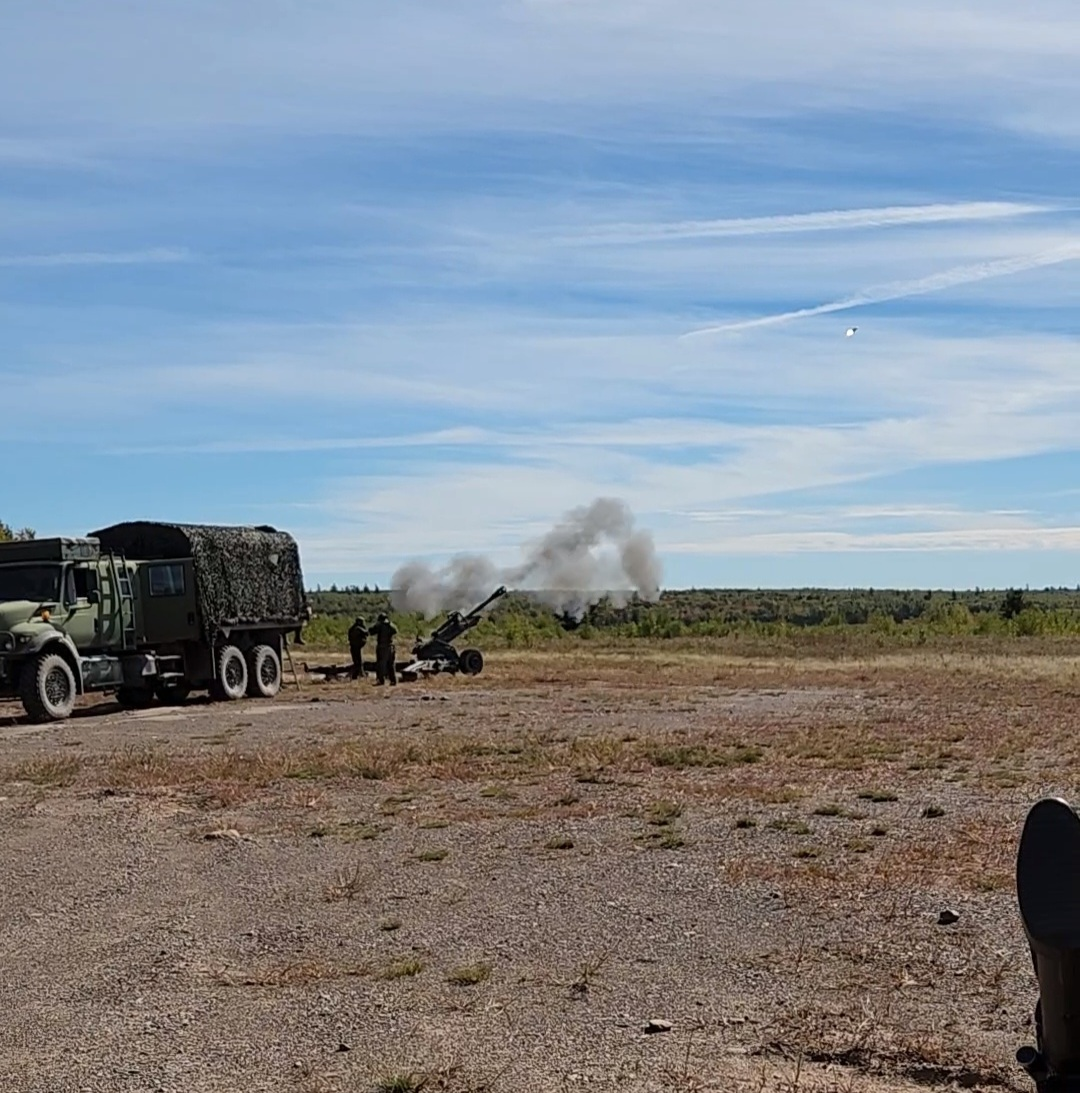
W battery firing LG1 105mm howitzer

== Sub-Units ==
- W Battery
- 45th Depot Battery, RCA (Fire Support)
- 67th Depot Battery, RCA (The Gatekeepers)
- Headquarters Battery
- Chief Instructor-in-Gunnery Cell

== Commandants ==
List of all Commandants of the RCAS:

- Colonel J.S. Orton MBE, MC, CD (1964–1967)
- Colonel D.W. Francis CD (1967–1968)
- Colonel D.R. Baker CD (1968–1971)
- Lieutenant-Colonel J.J.A. Doucet CD (1972–1973)
- Lieutenant-Colonel J.E. Crosman CD (1973–1976)
- Lieutenant-Colonel J.L.L. Charest CD (1976–1979)
- Lieutenant-Colonel R.V. Thompson CD (1979–1981)
- Lieutenant-Colonel D.B. Walton OMM, CD (1981–1983)
- Lieutenant-Colonel L.A. Brunum CD (1983–1986)
- Lieutenant-Colonel M.B. Morrison CD (1986–1988)
- Lieutenant-Colonel D.N. McLaughlin CD (1988–1990)
- Lieutenant-Colonel P.J. Kramers CD (1990–1992)
- Lieutenant-Colonel B.W. MacLeod CD (1992–1994)
- Lieutenant-Colonel R.D. Gunn CD (1994–1995)
- Lieutenant-Colonel S.J. Joudry CD (1995–1996)
- Lieutenant-Colonel D.S. Wiley CD (1996–1999)
- Lieutenant-Colonel K.F. Haeck CD (1999–2002)
- Lieutenant-Colonel (Colonel) Jack Ernest Crossman CD (2002–2004)
- Lieutenant-Colonel B.W. Douglas CD (2004–2006)
- Lieutenant-Colonel (Brigadier-General) Brian McPherson CD
- Lieutenant-Colonel (Colonel) J.M.A. LaFortune CD (2008–2010)
- Lieutenant-Colonel (Colonel) M.J.C. Sullivan CD (2010–2012)
- Lieutenant-Colonel J.E. Allen MSM, CD (2012–2012)
- Lieutenant-Colonel (Major-General) J.D.S. Masson OMM, MSM CD, (2012–2015)
- Lieutenant-Colonel (Colonel) B.M.V. Giroux CD (2015–2017)
- Lieutenant-Colonel (Brigadier-General) N.S. Roby CD (2017–2019)
- Lieutenant-Colonel (Colonel) K.S. Haire CD (2019–2021)
- Lieutenant-Colonel J.A. Phillips MMM, CD (2021 – 2023)
- Lieutenant-Colonel Leclerc-Desjardins CD (2023 – 2025)
- Lieutenant-Colonel M.W. Riopelle CD (2025 – Present)
