= 8th Field Artillery Regiment, RCA =

- Active: 1912-1970
- Country: Canada
- Branch: Canadian Militia (1912-1940); Canadian Army (1940-1970)
- Type: Artillery
- Role: Field Artillery
- Part of: Royal Regiment of Canadian Artillery
- Garrison/HQ: Hamilton, Ontario
- Mottos: Latin: Ubique., lit. 'Everywhere'; Latin: Quo fas et gloria ducunt, lit. 'Whither right and glory lead'
- March: Quick: British Grenadiers
- Engagements: First World War

The 8th Field Artillery Regiment, Royal Canadian Artillery was a Reserve regiment of the Royal Regiment of Canadian Artillery of the Canadian Army based in Hamilton, Ontario from the 1940s to 1970.

The regiment however traced its forebears further back however to 1912 and the establishment of the 13th Brigade, Canadian Field Artillery. During the First World War an 8th Brigade of Canadian Field Artillery was authorized for service with the Canadian Expeditionary Force. The brigade was authorized for service on 4 January 1916, and on 5 February 1916, the brigade embarked for Great Britain. On 14 July 1916, the brigade disembarked in France and later on 8 July 1917, was Redesignated as the 8th Army Brigade, CFA, CEF. The brigade provided field artillery support as part of the 3rd and 4th Canadian Divisional Artilleries in France and Flanders until the end of the war on 11 November 1918. On 23 October 1920, the 8th Brigade, CFA was disbanded.

The regiment was reduced to nil strength in 1970 and placed on the Supplementary Order of Battle.

== Lineage ==
=== 8th Field Artillery Regiment, RCA ===
- Originated on 1 April 1912, in Hamilton, Ontario, as the 13th Brigade, CFA.
- Redesignated on 2 February 1920, as the 8th Brigade, CFA.
- Redesignated on 1 July 1925, as the 8th Field Brigade, CA.
- Redesignated on 3 June 1935, as the 8th Field Brigade, RCA.
- Redesignated on 7 November 1940, as the 8th (Reserve) Field Brigade, RCA.
- Redesignated on 1 October 1942, as the 8th (Reserve) Field Regiment, RCA.
- Redesignated on 1 April 1946, as the 8th Medium Regiment, RCA.
- Redesignated on 28 November 1946, as the 8th Field Regiment, RCA.
- Amalgamated on 1 October 1954, with the 133rd Locating Battery, RCA.
- Redesignated on 12 April 1960, as the 8th Field Artillery Regiment, RCA.
- Reduced to Nil Strength on 1 April 1970, and Transferred to the Supplementary Order of Battle.

=== 133rd Locating Battery, RCA ===
- Originated on 23 August 1949, in Hamilton, Ontario, as the 133rd Locating Battery, RCA.
- Amalgamated on 12 April 1960, with 8th Field Regiment, RCA.

== Allocated Batteries ==
=== 8th Brigade, CFA (2 February 1920) ===
- 11th (Hamilton) Field Battery
- 10th (St. Catharines) Field Battery
- 40th Field Battery
- 49th Field Battery

=== 8th Medium Regiment, RCA (1 April 1946) ===
- 11th (Hamilton) Medium Battery
- 102nd (Wentworth) Medium Battery

=== 8th Field Regiment, RCA (28 November 1946) ===
- 11th (Hamilton) Field Battery
- 33rd Field Battery
- 40th Field Battery

=== 8th Field Regiment, RCA (1 October 1954) ===
- 11th (Hamilton) Field Battery
- 40th Field Battery
- 102nd (Wentworth) Field Battery

== Perpetuations ==
- 8th Brigade, CFA, CEF
