= Bay Street Armoury =

Military building in Victoria, British Columbia, Canada

Coordinates: 48°26′6.75″N 123°21′50.16″W

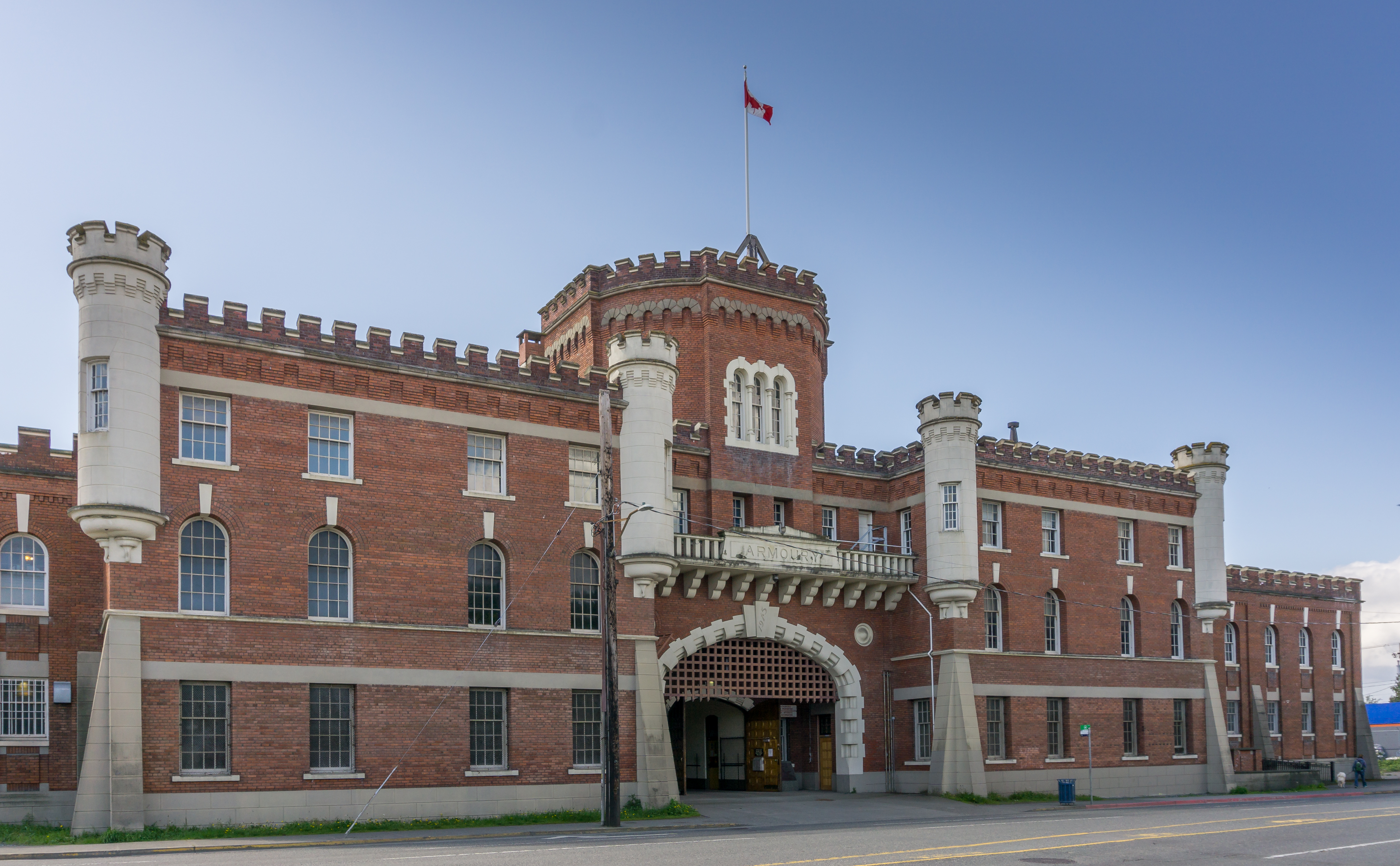
The Bay Street Armoury building in Victoria, British Columbia.

General Sir Arthur William Currie, GCMG, KCB, VD Armoury (Formerly Bay Street Armoury) is located at 715 Bay Street in Victoria, British Columbia.

The Bay Street Drill Hall was completed in 1915. It was created to provide training facilities for local militia units such as the Fifth Regiment of artillery, as well as to provide a home for two newly formed units, the 50th Gordon Highlanders of Canada and HQ Military District No. 11. The Armoury was designed by architect William Ridgway Wilson, (1863-1957).

In its earlier years the armoury had more extensive use for public events as modern public facilities in Victoria had not yet been built.

It was designated a historic building in 1989. it is a two-storey drill hall with Tudor Revival elements, built during the 1896 to 1918 period when over 100 drill halls and armouries were erected across Canada; its scale reflects the dramatic increase in military participation following Canada's performance during the Second Boer War.

On Friday, 05 December 2025 the Bay Street Armoury was renamed to the Gen Sir Arthur William Currie, GCMG, KCB, VD Armoury, after the World War I General, Arthur Currie.

== Units ==
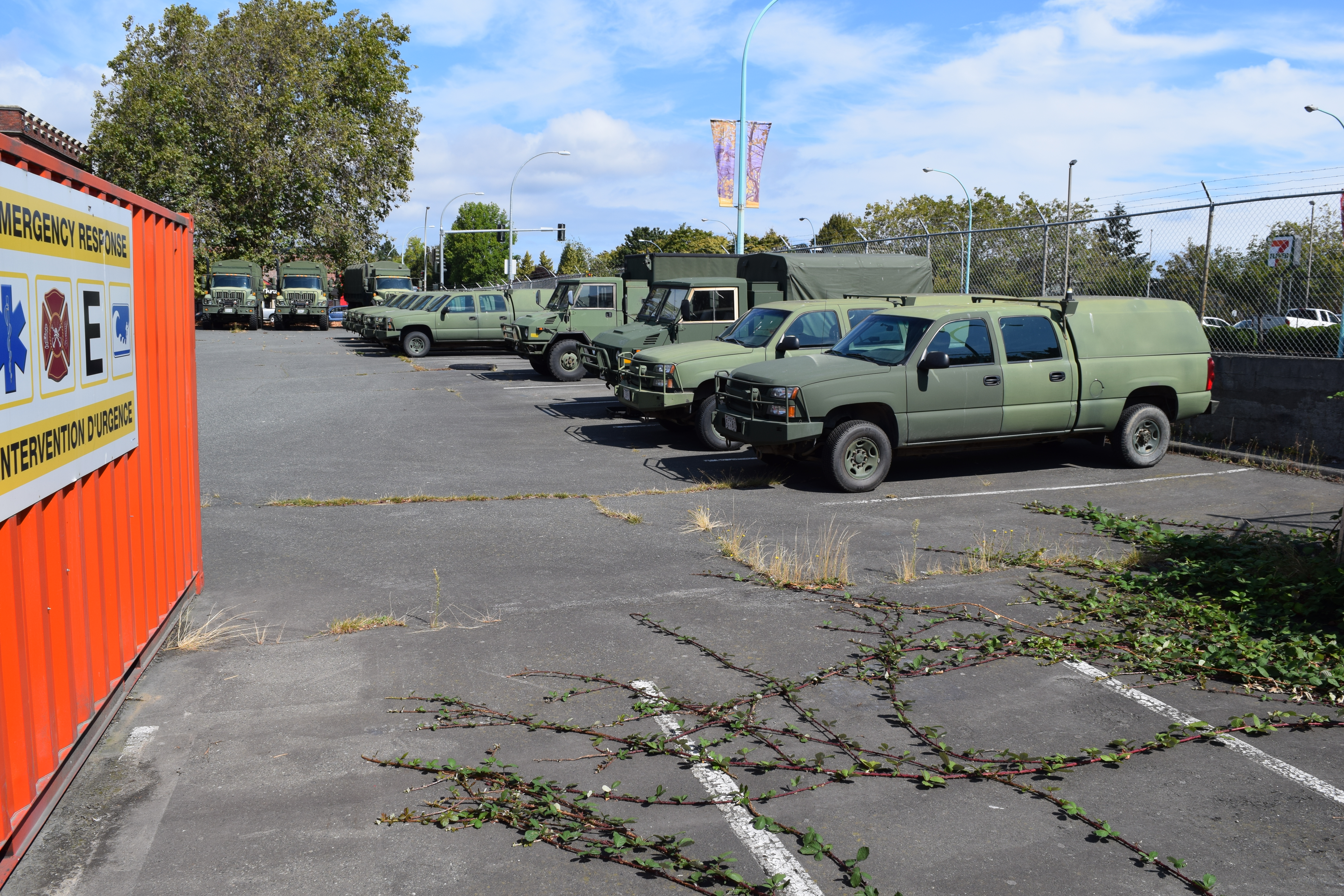
Vehicles at the armoury

The units stationed at the Bay Street Armoury are the 5th (British Columbia) Field Artillery Regiment, RCA, and The Canadian Scottish Regiment (Princess Mary's). The Armoury also hosts a squadron of the Royal Canadian Air Cadets.

Units that formally worked at the Bay Street Armoury included 11 (Victoria) Service Battalion (renamed 39 Service Battalion), 11 (Victoria) Medical Company (renamed 11 (Victoria) Field Ambulance), and 11 (Victoria) Military Police Platoon (renamed 12 Military Police Platoon). These units moved to Ashton Armory in 1994.

== 5th (BC) Artillery Regiment Museum ==
The 5th (BC) Artillery Regiment Museum is located in the armoury. The museum's artefacts reflect the history of 5th (British Columbia) Field Artillery Regiment, RCA and associated units from 1861 to the present day. Exhibits include field artillery and cannons, uniforms, band instruments, medals, weapons, insignia, photographs and more. The museum is open on Tuesday evenings.

== See also ==
- List of historic places in Victoria, British Columbia
