= Herb Petras =

Canadian general

Major-General (Ret'd) Herb Petras, CMM, CD, began his military career at the age of 16 when he joined the Royal Canadian Electrical and Mechanical Engineers. He attained the rank of warrant officer. On graduation from university he transferred to the infantry, where he commanded the Second Battalion, Irish Regiment and Northern Ontario Militia District (now 33 Canadian Brigade Group).

In 1980, he was selected to attend the United States Marine Corps Command and Staff College (Reserve) in Quantico, Virginia, US. This was followed by a tour on the Militia Officer Staff Course in Kingston.

On relinquishing command Petras was posted to Land Force Central Area Headquarters, where he served in strategic planning, the director of the Militia Officer Training School, responsible for all officer staff training, deputy chief of staff (operations) and deputy commander of Land Force Central Area.

In August 1999, he was posted to Chief of Land Staff, to do Language and Senior Leadership training. The following year, Petras was appointed Director General Land Reserves (DGLRes). During his tour as DGLRes he played a major role in implementing Phases I and II of Land Force Reserve Restructure.

In July 2003, he was appointed director general land combat development, a new position, with the mandate to shape, and re-energize the capability development process for the army. He served in that role until his appointment as chief – reserves and cadets in December 2004.

In addition to being the principal advisor to the Chief of the Defence Staff (CDS) on all matters Reserve, he led the preparation of the Canadian Forces (CF) Transformation Directive "The Future of the CF Reserve" which focused on Reserves as an operational, as well as a strategic capability, and set the foundation for the ongoing transformation of the Reserves in the Canadian Forces. Petras also served as chair of the NATO Reserve Forces Committee, where his work contributed to highlighting Canada's leadership role in NATO.

Petras was appointed Commander in the Order of Military Merit in 2006.

His military career complemented his civilian career in the education sector, where he served as director of athletics, and then principal of St Charles College and secondary school coordinator at the Sudbury Catholic School Board.

Petras has a Bachelor of Arts degree from Laurentian University and a master's degree from the University of Toronto.

He retired from the Canadian Forces in 2008, and is currently a member of the senior directing staff at the Canadian Forces College in Toronto.
