= Militia Act of 1855 =

Act of Parliament of Province of Canada

Parliament of the Province of Canada Parliament of Canada
- Long title: An Act to regulate the Militia of this Province, and to repeal the Acts now in force for that purpose.
- Citation: Anno Decimo-Octavo. Victoriae Reginae. Cap. LXXVII
- Territorial extent: Province of Canada; Provinces and territories of Canada
- Royal assent: 19 May 1855
- Status: Repealed

The Militia Act of 1855 was an Act passed by the Parliament of the Province of Canada that permitted the formation of an "Active Militia", which was later subdivided into the Permanent Active Militia (a standing army) and the Non-Permanent Active Militia, and divided the province into 18 military districts.

== History ==
Assisted by volunteer staff officers, each district was commanded by a colonel, while the entire operation was led by Colonel Étienne-Paschal Taché. Trained at the expense of taxpayers, the volunteers were armed, equipped and paid 5 shillings a day for 10 days of training a year (20 days for those in the artillery), with captains being paid 10 shillings 6 pence a day, however, the men had to provide their own uniforms. Initially set at 5,000 men, the Act's popularity forced the government to double its size to 10,000 men by 1856.

By 1858, enthusiasm waned when economic depression occupied the minds of Canadians. In 1860, military spirit was revived by the royal visit of the Prince of Wales. Canadians, Nova Scotians, and New Brunswickers launched their own volunteer units. These companies began to form into battalions that gradually eclipsed the Sedentary Militia. In 1864, the Sedentary Militia was re-styled as the "Non-Service Militia", and in 1869, its battalions were reduced to the "Reserve Militia" of each county. The Reserve Militia was last enrolled in 1873 (but never called out), deferred thereafter, and the theory that every able-bodied man was liable for service was finally abolished in 1950.

Exemption from military service: "Every person bearing a certificate from the Society of Quakers, Mennonites or Tunkers, or any inhabitant of Canada, of any religious denomination, otherwise subject to military duty, but who, from the doctrine of religion, is averse to bearing arms and refuses personal military service, shall be exempt from such service when balloted in time of peace, or war, upon such conditions and under such regulations as the Governor in Council, may, from time to time, prescribe." From 1869 to World War I, several orders in council were issued providing "entire exemption" for religious groups that the Canadian government was encouraging to immigrate to Canada. These were Mennonites from Russia (1873), Doukhobors (1898) and Hutterites (1899).

== Ministers responsible ==
- Minister of Militia and Defence (non British Army units up to 1906) for the Province of Canada 1855 to 1867.
- Minister of Militia and Defence 1867 to 1923.
- Minister of National Defence 1923 to 1940.

After 1940, the Militia became the Canadian Army with Active or Regular Forces and Reserve.

== See also ==
- Canadian Militia
- Royal Canadian Artillery
- Volunteer Army (British)
- National Defence Act 1923
- Military Service Act, 1917
- Naval Aid Bill 1912
- Naval Service Act 1910 - gave rise to the Naval Service Act 1911
- Otter Commission 1920
- Kennedy Report on the Reserve Army
- Supplementary Order of Battle
- Unification of the Canadian Armed Forces
