= Royal Regiment of Canadian Artillery =

Artillery branch of the Canadian Army

The Royal Regiment of Canadian Artillery
- Le Régiment royal de l'Artillerie canadienne (French)
- Regimental badge
- Active: 1871–present
- Country: Canada
- Branch: Canadian Army
- Type: Artillery
- Role: Field artillery; Air defence artillery
- Home station: CFB Shilo
- Patron: St. Barbara
- Mottos: Quo fas et gloria ducunt (Latin for 'whither right and glory lead')
- Colours: The guns of the RCA themselves
- March: Slow march: "Royal Artillery Slow March"; Quick march (dismounted parades): "British Grenadiers/The Voice of the Guns"; Trot past: "Keel Row"; Gallop past (horse artillery only): "Bonnie Dundee"
- Anniversaries: 1855: Militia Act of 1855 passed by the Parliament of the Province of Canada and creation the first truly Canadian army units; 27 November 1856: first Canadian artillery unit formed (Battalion of Montreal Artillery); 10 August 1883: Regiment of Canadian Artillery of the Permanent Active Militia authorized to be formed
- Current weapon systems: 105 mm Howitzer, C3; 155 mm Howitzer M777C1
- Battle honours: The word ubique (Latin for 'everywhere'), takes the place of all past and future battle honours in recognition of the artillery's widespread service in all battles and campaigns since its creation
- Website: rca-arc.org

Commanders
- Captain General: King Charles III
- Colonel commandant: Brigadier-General (Ret'd) D. Patterson (23 October 2021-present)
- Acting/Senior Serving Gunner: Brigadier-General S.Hunter (2021-present)
- Director RCA: Colonel K.L.A Bouckaert (2021-present)
- Regimental Colonel: Colonel David Grebstad (June 2022–present)
- Commander home station: Lieutenant-Colonel C.A. Wood (July 2021-present)
- Regimental sergeant-major: Chief Warrant Officer (MrGnr) Sean McGowan (2024-present)

Insignia
- Abbreviation: RCA (for Royal Canadian Artillery, the former regimental designation of 3 June 1935)
- Headdress: Dark blue beret

The Royal Regiment of Canadian Artillery (French: Le Régiment royal de l'Artillerie canadienne), formerly and commonly known as the Royal Canadian Artillery, is the artillery personnel branch of the Canadian Army.

== History ==
Many of the units and batteries of the Royal Regiment of Canadian Artillery are older than the Dominion of Canada itself. The first artillery company in Canada was formed in the province of Canada (New France) in 1750.

Volunteer Canadian artillery batteries existed before 1855 but their history is mostly unknown. Seven batteries of artillery were formed after the passage of the Militia Act of 1855 which allowed Canada to retain a paid military force of 5,000 men. One of the pre-1855 volunteer batteries formed in Saint John, New Brunswick, in 1793 was called the "Loyal Company of Artillery" and exists today as the 3rd Field Artillery Regiment, RCA.

=== After Confederation ===
On 20 October 1871, the first regular Canadian army units were created, in the form of two batteries of garrison artillery; thus, that date is considered the regiment's birthday. "A" Battery in Kingston, Ontario, and "B" Battery in Quebec City, Quebec, became gunnery schools and performed garrison duties in their respective towns. They are still active today as part of the 1st Regiment, Royal Canadian Horse Artillery (RCHA).

The Royal Canadian Artillery was granted its 'Royal' prefix by Queen Victoria on May 24, 1893.

The Royal Canadian Artillery has participated in every major conflict in Canada's history.

=== Riel Rebellions ===
In 1870, in response to the Red River Rebellion led by Louis Riel, Colonel Garnet Wolseley led a force of British regulars and Canadian Militia across Northern Ontario to quell the uprising. The force never partook in any combat. Following the establishment of Manitoba in May 1870, the militia portion of the force was garrisoned along the Red River. After 1872 this included the newly formed Manitoba Demi-Battery, which was composed of Regular gunners of "A" and "B" Battery.

In 1885, when Riel led the North-West Rebellion in the District of Saskatchewan, A and B Batteries, as well as several militia batteries, including the Winnipeg Field Battery, were dispatched to quell the uprising. Upon arriving in Saskatchewan, "A" Battery and Winnipeg Field fought at Fish Creek and Batoche. "B" Battery moved west to Swift Current where they participated in the Battle of Cut Knife, which saw the first use by Canadian soldiers of the machine gun, and the last time in Canadian history that bows and arrows were used in battle.

In 1886, the Regular Gunners of A & B Batteries returned east, transferring their guns to the North-West Mounted Police.

=== Boer War ===
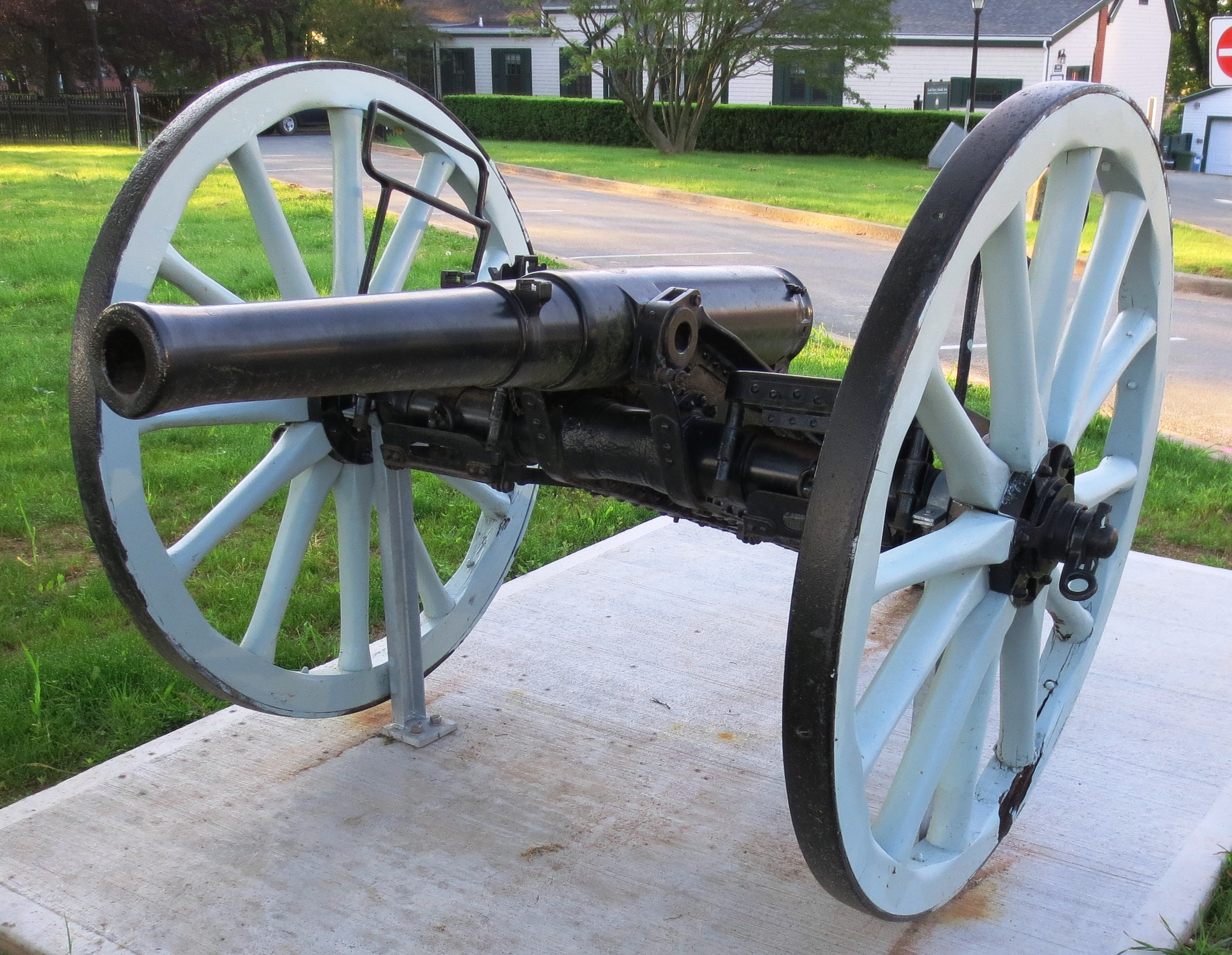
A 12-pounder gun at the Royal Artillery Park, Halifax, Nova Scotia

"The British Grenadiers"
"The British Grenadiers", performed here by the United States Army Band Strings ensemble, is the authorized march of several British Commonwealth military regiments.

During the war in South Africa, Canada contributed the Brigade Division of the Canadian Field Artillery. It consisted of three batteries, named "C", "D" and "E", each of six 12-pounder field guns. Each battery consisted of three sections of two guns each, and was manned by a core of Permanent Force soldiers, with additional members from the Militia. The militia for "C" and "D" batteries came from Ontario and Winnipeg, while "E" battery had militia from Quebec, New Brunswick, and Nova Scotia.

"D" and "E" Batteries arrived in Cape Town aboard the SS Laurentian in February 1900, and were soon sent north to form part of a column based at Victoria West under Colonel Sir Charles Parsons. In March and April they took part in an operation in the Kenhardt district, covering 700 miles (1,100 km) in six weeks, seeing little action, but much heavy rain. On 29 May, "E" battery was part of another operation under Lieutenant-General Sir Charles Warren, when it was attacked at Faber's Put. The Boers were eventually driven off, though the battery had one man killed and eight wounded. In his subsequent despatch Warren particularly mentioned "E" Battery's Major Ogilvie and Captain Mackie. By the end of June "E" Battery had been split up into sections and was stationed along the Kimberley–Mafeking Railway.

In July 1900 "D" Battery moved to Pretoria to operate in the Transvaal in a column commanded by Colonel Ian Hamilton, and saw much action, with a section particularly distinguishing itself at the battle of Leliefontein, when 100 men of the Royal Canadian Dragoons and 2nd Canadian Mounted Rifles, bolstered by a single Colt machine gun and the two 12-pounders of the battery, repelled an attack by 200 mounted Boers while covering the withdrawal of the main column. Three Victoria Crosses were awarded for valour during the engagement.

"C" Battery arrived at Cape Town aboard the SS Columbian in March 1900, but within two weeks were re-embarked to sail to Beira, from where they travelled by train, cart, and forced march to join Lieutenant-Colonel Herbert Plumer's column 70 miles (110 km) south of Otse by mid-April to take part in the relief of Mafeking. Colonel Baden-Powell, the garrison commander at Mafeking, sent a telegram to the Canadian Government: "Mafeking relieved today, and most grateful for invaluable assistance of Canadian Artillery, which made record march from Beira to help us". From the end of May the battery operated with Plumer's column in the Zeerust district until November, seeing action regularly.

The unit never operated as a whole, with the batteries, and sometimes even sections, operating independently, often for months at a time, and it was only reunited when it regrouped to return to Canada in June 1901.

=== World War I ===
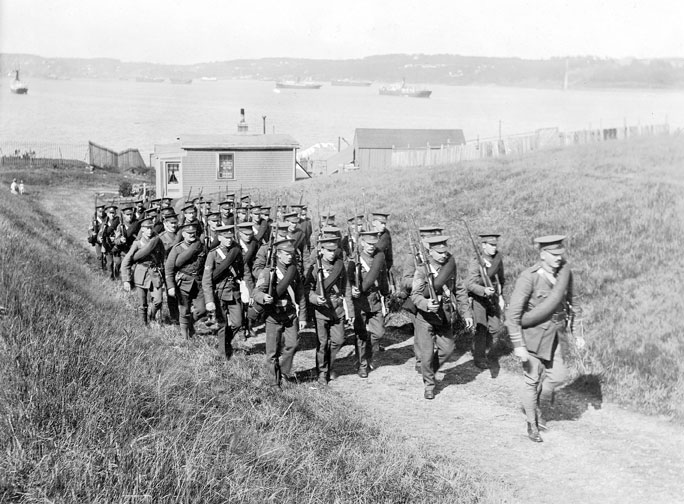
A detachment of the 1st Regiment Canadian Garrison Artillery at Fort Charlotte in Halifax in 1914

The Canadian Artillery and the Garrison Artillery were the designations of the Non-Permanent Active Militia as of 1 January 1914. The Canadian Artillery and the Garrison Artillery were collectively re-designated the Royal Canadian Artillery on 3 June 1935.

Formation	Sub-Units
By November 1918, the 1st Canadian Division had expanded to the following artillery units:
1st Brigade, C.F.A.	1st Field Battery; 3rd Field Battery; 4th Field Battery; 2nd Howitzer Battery
2nd Brigade, C.F.A.	5th Field Battery; 6th Field Battery; 7th Field Battery; 48th Howitzer Battery; 1st Division Ammunition Column
By November 1918, the 2nd Canadian Division had expanded to the following artillery units:
5th Brigade, C.F.A.	17th Field Battery; 18th Field Battery; 20th Field Battery; 23rd Howitzer Battery
6th Brigade, C.F.A.	15th Field Battery; 16th Field Battery; 25th Field Battery; 22nd Howitzer Battery; 2nd Division Ammunition Column
By November 1918, the 3rd Canadian Division had expanded to the following artillery units:
9th Brigade, C.F.A.	31st Field Battery; 33rd Field Battery; 45th Field Battery; 36th Howitzer Battery
10th Brigade, C.F.A.	38th Field Battery; 39th Field Battery; 40th Field Battery; 35th Howitzer Battery; 3rd Division Ammunition Column
By November 1918, the 4th Canadian Division had expanded to the following artillery units:
3rd Brigade, C.F.A.	10th Field Battery; 11th Field Battery; 12th Field Battery; 9th Howitzer Battery
4th Brigade, C.F.A.	13th Field Battery; 19th Field Battery; 27th Field Battery; 21st Howitzer Battery; 4th Division Ammunition Column
Canadian Corps Troops – Corps Heavy Artillery
1st Brigade, C.G.A.	1st Siege Battery; 3rd Siege Battery; 7th Siege Battery; 9th Siege Battery
2nd Brigade, C.G.A.	1st Heavy Battery; 2nd Heavy Battery; 2nd Siege Battery; 4th Siege Battery; 5th Siege Battery; 6th Siege Battery
3rd Brigade, C.G.A.	8th Siege Battery; 10th Siege Battery; 11th Siege Battery; 12th Siege Battery
5th Divisional Artillery
13th Brigade, C.F.A.	52nd Field Battery; 53rd Field Battery; 55th Field Battery; 51st Howitzer Battery
14th Brigade, C.F.A.	60th Field Battery; 61st Field Battery; 66th Field Battery; 58th Howitzer Battery; 5th Division Ammunition Column
Army Service Corps	5th Divisional Artillery Motor Transport Detachment
Canadian Cavalry Brigade – Artillery	Royal Canadian Horse Artillery Brigade
Army troops – Attached to the British Expeditionary Force – Artillery
8th Army Brigade, C.F.A.	24th Field Battery; 30th Field Battery; 32nd Field Battery; 43rd Howitzer Battery; 8th Army Brigade Ammunition Column; "E" Anti-Aircraft Battery

=== World War II ===
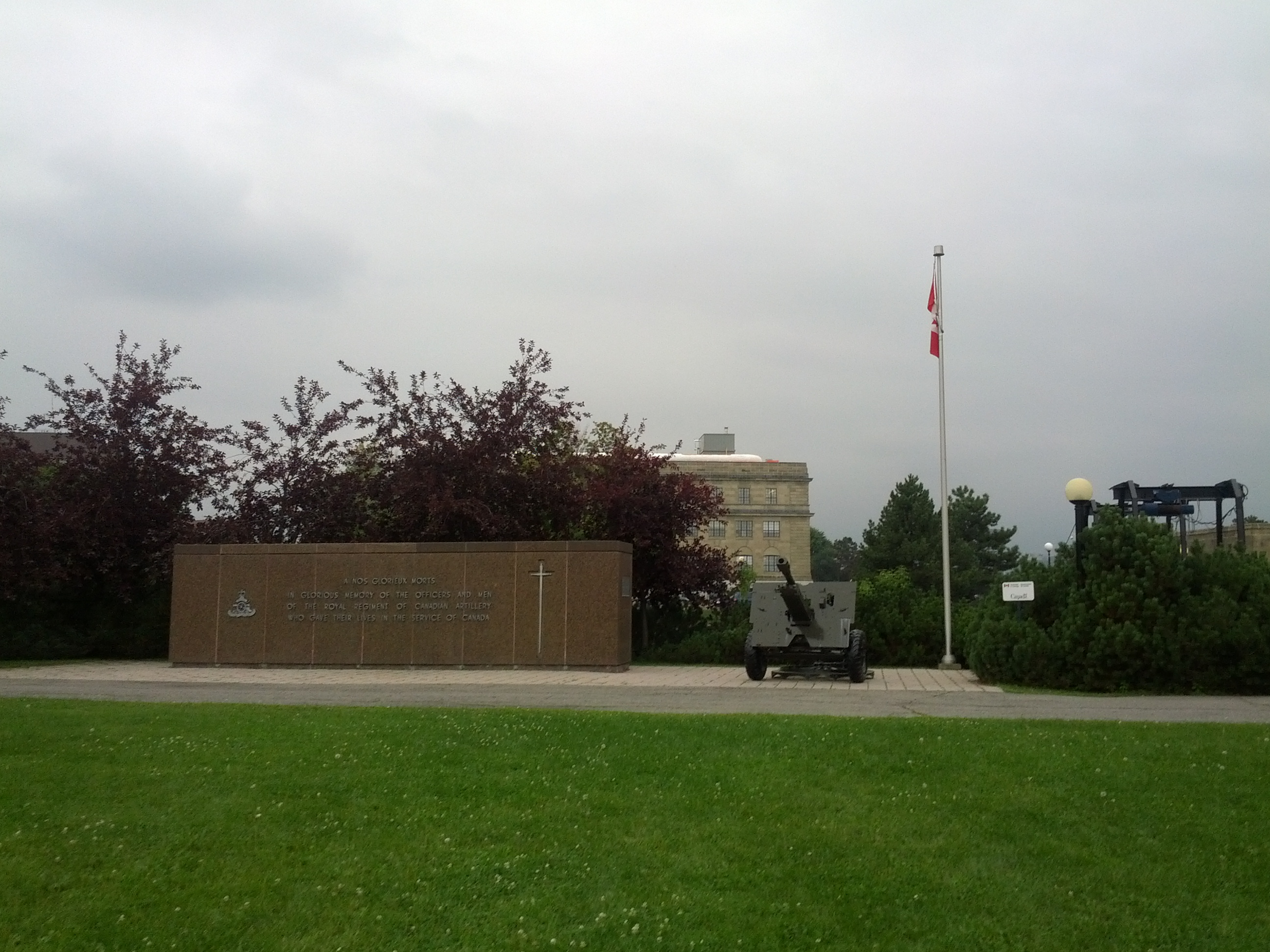
Monument to The Royal Regiment of Canadian Artillery in Ottawa.

The R.C.H.A. and R.C.A. expanded tremendously during the war to contribute the following units to the European theater:

Formation	Regiments
1st Canadian Infantry Division	1st Field Regiment, Royal Canadian Horse Artillery; 2nd Field Regiment, Royal Canadian Artillery; 3rd Field Regiment, Royal Canadian Artillery; 1st Anti-Tank Regiment; 2nd Light Anti-Aircraft Regiment
2nd Canadian Infantry Division	4th Field Regiment; 5th Field Regiment; 6th Field Regiment; 2nd Anti-Tank Regiment; 3rd Light Anti-Aircraft Regiment
3rd Canadian Infantry Division	12th Field Regiment; 13th Field Regiment; 14th Field Regiment; 3rd Anti-Tank Regiment; 4th Light Anti-Aircraft Regiment
4th Canadian (Armoured) Division	15th Field Regiment; 23rd Field Regiment (Self-Propelled); 5th Anti-Tank Regiment; 8th Light Anti-Aircraft Regiment
5th Canadian (Armoured) Division	17th Field Regiment; 8th Field Regiment (Self-Propelled); 4th Anti-Tank Regiment; 5th Light Anti-Aircraft Regiment
I Canadian Corps Troops	7th Anti-Tank Regiment R.C.A.; 1st Survey Regiment R.C.A.
II Canadian Corps Troops	6th Anti-Tank Regiment R.C.A.; 2nd Survey Regiment R.C.A.; 6th Light Anti-Aircraft Regiment R.C.A.
First Canadian Army Troops	No. 1 Army Group R.C.A.; 11th Army Field Regiment; 1st Medium Regiment, Royal Canadian Artillery; 2nd Medium Regiment, Royal Canadian Artillery; 5th Medium Regiment, Royal Canadian Artillery
First Canadian Army Troops	No. 2 Army Group R.C.A.; 19th Army Field Regiment; 3rd Medium Regiment, Royal Canadian Artillery; 4th Medium Regiment, Royal Canadian Artillery; 7th Medium Regiment, Royal Canadian Artillery

Other regiments included the 9th Anti-Tank Regiment (Self-Propelled) (Argyll Light Infantry), RCA.

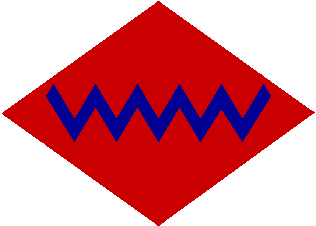
The formation patch worn by R.C.A. personnel attached directly to I Canadian Corps.

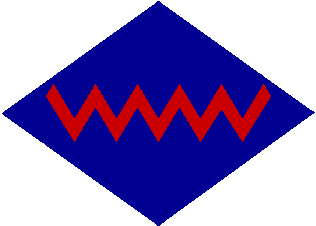
The formation patch worn by R.C.A. personnel attached directly to II Canadian Corps.

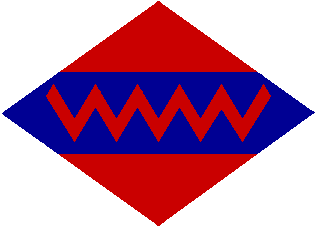
The formation patch worn by R.C.A. personnel attached directly to the First Canadian Army.

=== Coastal defences Pacific coast ===
The RCA was also responsible for the defence of Canada on both the west and east coasts. In 1936 a review was done by Major Treatt of the Royal Artillery of the existing defences and potential sites for new forts. Efforts to improve the existing fortifications and build new ones were well underway by 1939.

There were approximately 10 armed forts and gun positions established along the Pacific west coast. The ones in the Strait of Juan de Fuca were integrated with the U.S. coastal defences. As the war progressed and the threat of attack diminished, the forts were gradually drawn down and demobilized. The last active coastal defence fort on the west coast, Fort Rodd Hill, was deactivated in 1958.

=== Cold War ===
The Regular and Reserve components of the Royal Canadian Horse Artillery, Royal Canadian Artillery and Royal Canadian Garrison Artillery were collectively re-designated the Royal Regiment of Canadian Artillery on 29 October 1956.

=== Afghanistan ===
"F" Battery, 2nd Regiment, RCHA, fired the first Canadian artillery rounds in Afghanistan in February 2004 as part of Operation Athena's first rotation. The mission was shot with a 105 mm LG1 and consisted of illumination rounds shot in a range spread to identify a potential rocket launching site used by insurgents.

In December 2005, 1st Regiment, RCHA, conducted an inaugural firing of its first 155 mm M777 towed howitzers. The first six guns delivered were supplied by the United States Marine Corps under a foreign military sales (FMS) contract between the U.S. and Canada. The Canadian guns were first fired by "A" Battery, 1 RCHA, at CFB Shilo and then were deployed to Afghanistan in support of Operation Archer, and were put into service in the Canadian theatre of operations around Kandahar in early 2006. This marked the first use by any nation of the M777 in combat operations. Regular RCHA units, reinforced by volunteers from Reserve units, continued to support operations until Canada completed its combat mission in Afghanistan in March 2014.

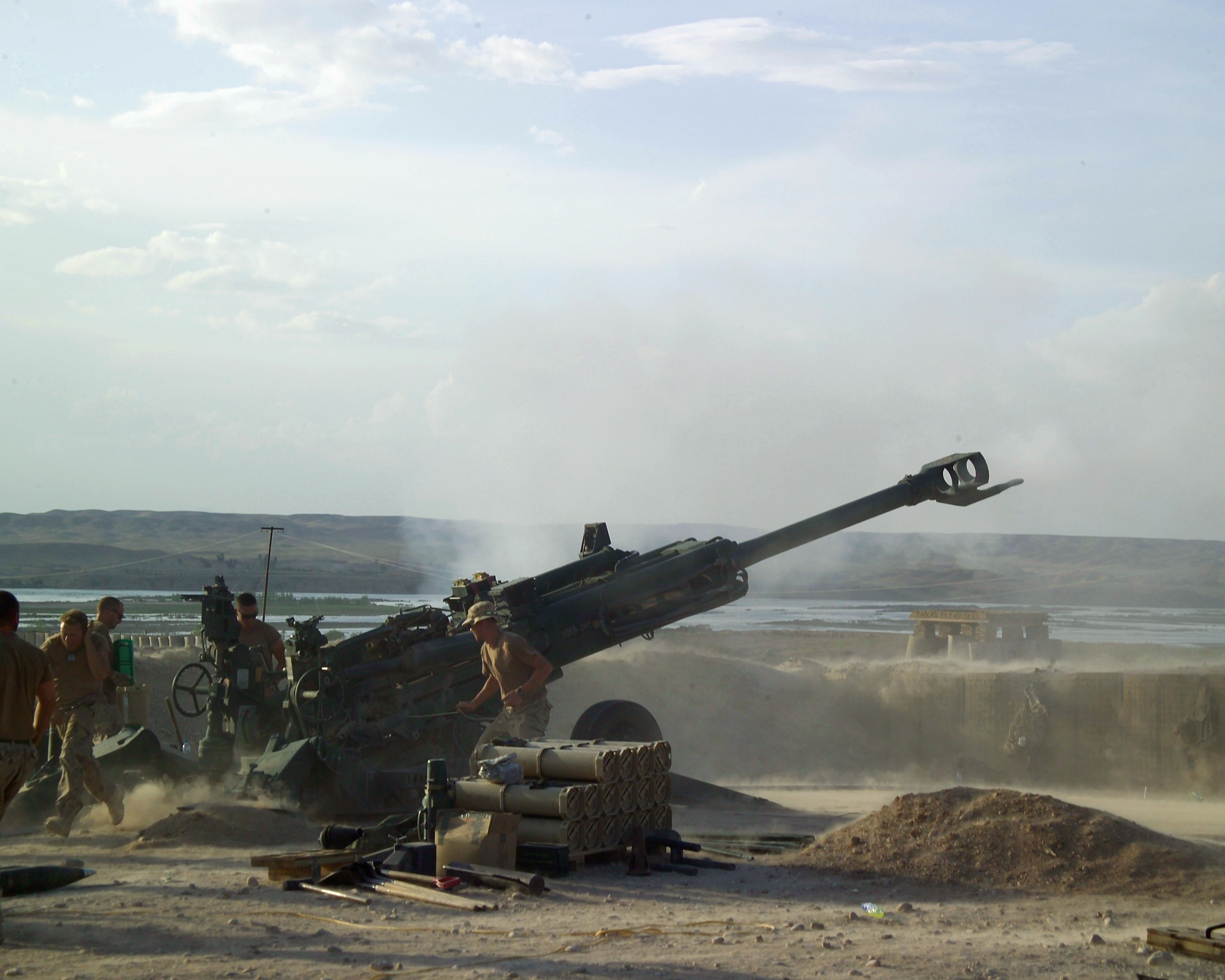
Canadian soldiers fire an M777 howitzer in Afghanistan.

=== Since Afghanistan ===
In June 2017, the Royal Canadian Artillery Band, one of only two Regular bands in the Canadian Army, provided musical support for a contingent of the 2nd Battalion, Princess Patricia's Canadian Light Infantry which provided the Queen's Guard at Buckingham Palace, St James's Palace and the Tower of London, as well as Windsor Castle. In October–November 2018, the Band again deployed to England to provide musical support for a contingent from the 3rd Battalion, The Royal Canadian Regiment, which provided the Queen's Guard.

== Units ==
The Royal Regiment of Canadian Artillery is composed of both regular and reserve (militia) forces. The regular force component is composed of five units, four of which are front line operation units; of these, three are field artillery regiments while the fourth is a low level air defence unit. The fifth regular unit is the Royal Canadian Artillery School. Additionally, while the three field artillery regiments are on the RCA's order of battle, they are badged as regiments of the Royal Canadian Horse Artillery.

In 2026, as part of the ongoing restructuring of the regular Canadian Army, the formation of two new regular artillery regiments was announced. The first, 8th (Air Defence) Regiment, Royal Canadian Artillery, is due to stand up in 2026 and will form one of a pair of artillery units dedicated to the air defence mission, with 4th Regiment, RCA to convert to a dedicated air defence unit from 2027. The second, 9th (Rocket) Regiment, Royal Canadian Artillery, is to be formed by the conversion of one of the field artillery regiments by 2030, and will operate missile systems in the long range strike and anti-shipping roles. The field artillery regiment designated for this task, 1st Regiment, RCHA, will subsequently be re-established in its previous role.

=== Regulars ===
Regiment	Headquarters	Batteries
1st Regiment, Royal Canadian Horse Artillery	CFB Shilo	"A" (The Queen's) Battery; "B" Battery; "C" Battery; "Z" Battery; Headquarters and Services Battery
2nd Regiment, Royal Canadian Horse Artillery	CFB Petawawa	"D" Battery; "E" Battery; "F" Battery; "Y" Battery; Headquarters and Services Battery
4th Artillery Regiment (General Support), RCA (Note: On 5 September 2014 the regiment officially changed its name from 4th Air Defence Regiment RCA to the current name in order to reflect better its evolving support to the Canadian Army,) (Note: 4th Regiment will convert back to a dedicated air defence unit operating in the Very Short Range Air Defence (VSHORAD) role by 2028. This will be reflected in the regiment changing back to its former name.)	CFB Gagetown	127th Battery – airspace coordination centre (ASCC) (Note: built to support a brigade group when ordered); 128th Battery – counter-battery medium-range radars (MRR).; 129th Battery – CU-172 Blackjack small unmanned aircraft systems (SUAS).; Headquarters and Services Battery
5^{e} Régiment d'artillerie légère du Canada	CFB Valcartier	"X" Battery – howitzer battery; "Q" Battery – surveillance and target acquisition battery; "R" Battery – howitzer battery; "V" Battery – forward observation battery; Headquarters and Services Battery
8th (Air Defence) Regiment, RCA	CFB Gagetown	3 x Short-Range Air Defence batteries (to be formed by 2029); Headquarters and Services Battery
The Royal Regiment of Canadian Artillery School	CFB Gagetown	"W" Battery (Formerly of the presently stood-down 4th Regiment, Royal Canadian Horse Artillery); 45th Depot Battery, RCA (Fire Support); 67th Depot Battery, RCA (The Gatekeepers); Headquarters Battery

=== Reserves ===
==== Regiments ====
Regiment	Headquarters	Batteries
1st (Halifax-Dartmouth) Field Artillery Regiment, RCA	Halifax, Nova Scotia	51st Field Battery, RCA; 84th Field Battery, RCA (Yarmouth, Nova Scotia)
2nd Field Artillery Regiment, RCA	Montreal, Quebec	7th Field Battery, RCA; 50th Field Battery, RCA; 66th Field Battery, RCA
3rd Field Artillery Regiment, RCA	Saint John, New Brunswick	89th Field Battery, RCA; 115th Field Battery, RCA (The Loyal Company); The Band of the 3rd Field Artillery Regiment, RCA
5th (British Columbia) Field Artillery Regiment, RCA	Victoria, British Columbia	155th Field Battery, RCA (Victoria, British Columbia); 156th Field Battery, RCA (Nanaimo, British Columbia); The Band of the 5th (BC) Field Regiment, RCA (Victoria, British Columbia)
6th Field Artillery Regiment, RCA	Lévis, Quebec	57th Field Battery, RCA; 59th Field Battery, RCA; 58th Field Battery, RCA
7th Toronto Regiment, RCA	Toronto, Ontario	9th Field Battery, RCA; 15th Field Battery, RCA; 130th Field Battery, RCA; The Band of the 7th Toronto Regiment, RCA
10th Field Artillery Regiment, RCA	Regina, Saskatchewan	18th Field Battery, RCA (Regina, Saskatchewan); 64th Field Battery, RCA (Yorkton, Saskatchewan)
11th Field Artillery Regiment, RCA	Guelph, Ontario	11th Field Battery (Hamilton-Wentworth), RCA; 16th Field Battery, RCA; 29th Field Battery, RCA
15th Field Artillery Regiment, RCA	Vancouver, British Columbia	31st Field Battery, RCA; 68th Field Battery, RCA; The Band of the 15th Field Regiment, RCA
20th Field Artillery Regiment, RCA	Edmonton, Alberta	61st Field Battery, RCA (Edmonton, Alberta); 78th Field Battery, RCA (Red Deer, Alberta)
26th Field Artillery Regiment, RCA	Brandon, Manitoba	13th Field Battery, RCA (Portage la Prairie, Manitoba); 71st Field Battery, RCA (Brandon, Manitoba)
30th Field Artillery Regiment, RCA	Ottawa, Ontario	1st Field Battery, RCA; 2nd Field Battery, RCA
42nd Field Artillery Regiment (Lanark and Renfrew Scottish), RCA	Pembroke, Ontario	35th Field Battery, RCA
49th Field Artillery Regiment, RCA	Sault Ste. Marie, Ontario	30th Field Battery, RCA; 148th Field Battery, RCA
56th Field Artillery Regiment, RCA	Brantford, Ontario	10th Field Battery, RCA (St Catharines); 54th Field Battery, RCA (Brantford); 69th Field battery, RCA (Simcoe)
62nd Field Artillery Regiment, RCA	Shawinigan, Quebec	81st Field Battery, RCA; 185th Field Battery, RCA; The Band of the 62nd Field Artillery Regiment, RCA

==== Independent batteries ====
Independent Battery	Headquarters
20th Independent Field Battery, RCA	Lethbridge, AB
84th Independent Field Battery, RCA	Yarmouth, Nova Scotia
116th Independent Field Battery, RCA	Kenora, Ontario

Since spring 2005, 10th Field Regiment, 26th Field Regiment and 116th Independent Field Battery have been grouped together as 38 Canadian Brigade Group's (38 CBG) Artillery Tactical Group (ATG).

==== Bands ====
Current:

Band	Headquarters	Formation
The Royal Canadian Artillery Band	Edmonton, AB	Regular Force
The Band of the 5th (BC) Field Regiment, RCA	Victoria, BC	Reserve Force
The Band of the 7th Toronto Regiment, RCA	Toronto, ON	Reserve Force
The Band of the 15th Field Regiment, RCA	Vancouver, BC	Reserve Force

Former:

Band
RCA 11th Field Regiment Trumpet Band
RCA 44th Field Regiment Trumpet Band
RCA 30th Field Regiment Trumpet Band
RCA 8th Field Regiment Trumpet Band
RCA 56th Field Regiment Trumpet Band
RCA 7th Field Regiment Trumpet Band

== Supplementary Order of Battle ==
Regiments on the Supplementary Order of Battle legally exist but have no personnel or materiel.

Regiment	Formed	To SOB	Headquarters
3rd Regiment, Royal Canadian Horse Artillery	1951	1992	Shilo, Manitoba
4th Regiment, Royal Canadian Horse Artillery	1952	1970	Petawawa, Ontario
8th Field Artillery Regiment, RCA	1912	1970	Hamilton, Ontario
12th Field Artillery Regiment, RCA	1905	1965	Fredericton, New Brunswick
14th Field Artillery Regiment, RCA	1912	1968	Yarmouth, Nova Scotia
18th Field Artillery Regiment, RCA	1920	1970	Lethbridge, Alberta
21st Field Artillery Regiment, RCA	1936	1970	Wingham, Ontario
24th Field Artillery Regiment, Royal Canadian Artillery	1914	1965	Trail, British Columbia
27th Field Artillery Regiment, RCA	1910	1970	Farnham, Quebec
29th Field Artillery Regiment, RCA	1898	1965	Sarnia, Ontario
34th Field Artillery Regiment, RCA	1942	1965	Montreal, Quebec
37th Field Artillery Regiment, RCA	1905	1965	Montreal, Quebec
39th Field Artillery Regiment (Self-Propelled), RCA	1914	1965	Winnipeg, Manitoba
40th Field Artillery Regiment, RCA	1936	1981	Kenora, Ontario
44th Field Artillery Regiment, RCA	1946	1965	St. Catharines, Ontario
46th Field Artillery Regiment, RCA	1936	1968	Drummondville, Quebec
50th Field Artillery Regiment (The Prince of Wales Rangers), RCA	1866	1970	Peterborough, Ontario
53rd Field Artillery Regiment, RCA	1946	1968	Yorkton, Saskatchewan
57th Field Artillery Regiment (2nd/10th Dragoons), RCA	1872	1970	Niagara Falls, Ontario
19th Medium Artillery Regiment, RCA	1920	1965	Calgary, Alberta
33rd Medium Artillery Regiment, RCA	1946	1965	Cobourg, Ontario
42nd Medium Artillery Regiment, RCA	1931	1965	Toronto, Ontario
1st Artillery Locating Regiment, RCA	1946	1965	Toronto, Ontario

== Order of precedence ==
RCHA on parade with guns:

Preceded by Naval Operations Branch	The Royal Canadian Horse Artillery (See note below)	Succeeded by Army elements of Royal Military College of Canada

RCHA on dismounted parades:

Preceded by Army elements of Royal Military College of Canada	The Royal Canadian Horse Artillery (See note below)	Succeeded by Royal Canadian Armoured Corps

RCA units:

Preceded by Royal Canadian Armoured Corps	The Royal Canadian Artillery	Succeeded by Corps of Royal Canadian Engineers

Despite not being the senior component of the Canadian Army, the honour of "the right of the line" (precedence over other units), on an army parade, is held by the units of the RCHA when on parade with their guns. On dismounted parades, RCHA units take precedence over all other land force units except formed bodies of Officer Cadets of the Royal Military College of Canada representing their college. RCA units parade to the left of units of the Royal Canadian Armoured Corps. The Royal Canadian Artillery does not carry colours. Its guns are its colours and are saluted on parade.

== Affiliations ==
- United Kingdom – Royal Regiment of Artillery
- Australia – Royal Regiment of Australian Artillery
- New Zealand – Royal Regiment of New Zealand Artillery

== Royal Canadian Artillery Museum ==
Royal Canadian Artillery Museum
- Location: CFB Shilo, P.O. Box 5000, Stn Main, Shilo, Manitoba, Canada
- Type: Artillery Museum
- Website: rca-arc.org/heritage/artillery-museums/

As the principal artillery museum in Canada, the Royal Canadian Artillery Museum presents, acquires, preserves, researches and interprets the contributions of the Royal Regiment of Canadian Artillery and the Canadian military to the heritage of Canada. The museum is affiliated with: CMA, CHIN, OMMC and Virtual Museum of Canada.

== Memorials ==
A memorial wall and an artillery field gun, were erected on 21 September 1959 by the Royal Regiment of Canadian Artillery, which is dedicated to the memory of the members of the regiment killed in the service of Canada. It was relocated from its original location at Major's Hill Park to Green Island Park in Ottawa, Ontario and rededicated on 24 May 1998.

== Recognition ==
The freedom of the city was accepted by the 5th (British Columbia) Field Battery, Royal Regiment of Canadian Artillery in Victoria, British Columbia on 4 November 1979.

== Armoury ==
Site	Date(s)	Designated	Location	Description	Image
Colonel D. V. Currie VC Armoury, 1215 Main Street North.	1913–14	1998 Register of the Government of Canada Heritage Buildings	Moose Jaw, Saskatchewan	large, low-massed brick structure in the north end of Moose Jaw in a mixed commercial, recreational and residential neighbourhood.; Currently the home of the Saskatchewan Dragoons; it has housed 95th Saskatchewan Rifles, the 60th Rifles, the King's Own Rifles of Canada, the 77th Battery, Royal Canadian Artillery, the 19th Medical Company, Royal Canadian Army Medical Corps, and the 142nd Transport Company, Royal Canadian Army Service Corps	

== Popular culture ==
- James Doohan was a lieutenant in the 14th Field Regiment, RCA, during World War II. During D-Day he was wounded by friendly fire, and his right middle finger was amputated. He later played Montgomery Scott on Star Trek.
- The Royal Canadian Artillery is playable force featured heavily in the video game Company of Heroes: Opposing Fronts.
- The Royal Canadian Horse Artillery are playable units in the Wargame franchise in "Wargame: Airland Battle" and "Wargame: Red Dragon" by Eugen Systems.
- The Royal Canadian Artillery are also playable unites featured in both Steel Division: Normandy 44 and its sequel Steel Division 2 by Eugen Systems.

== See also ==
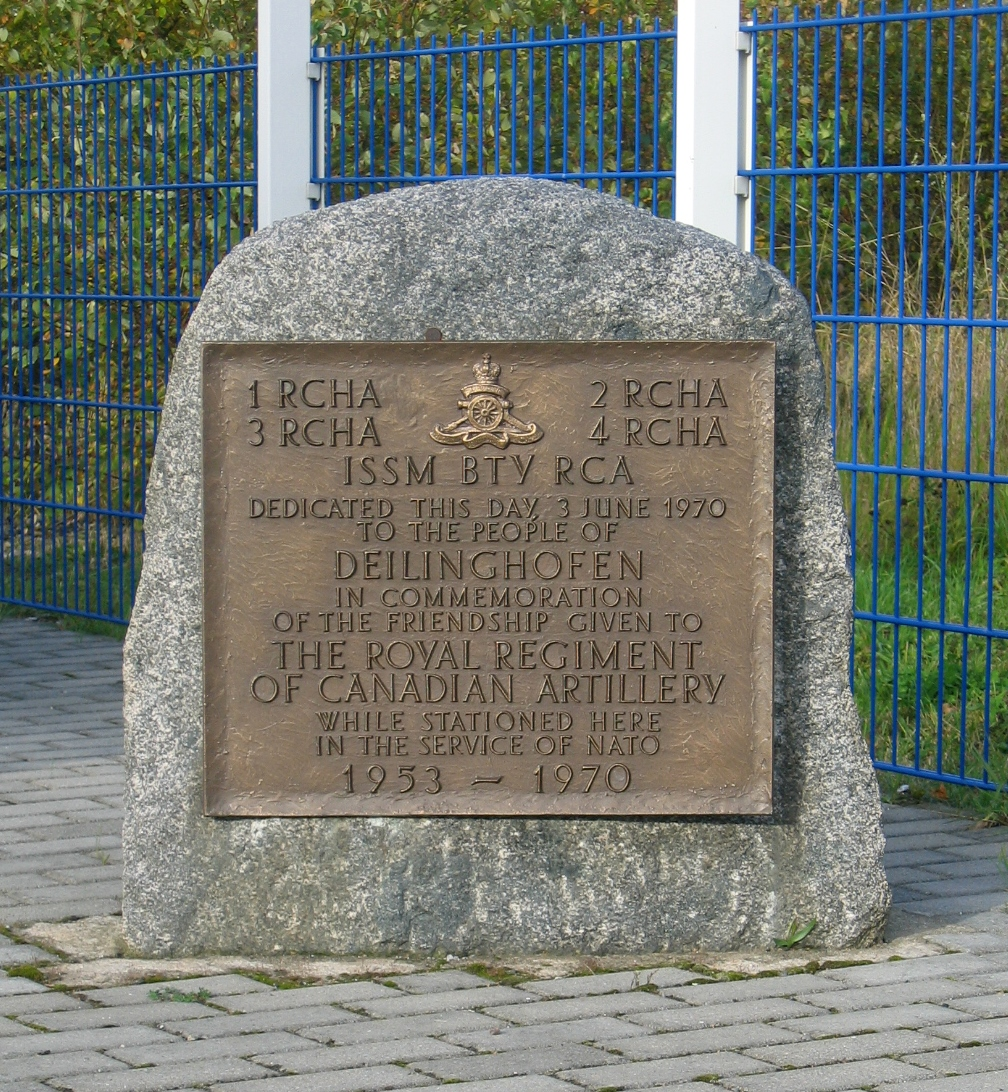
Plaque in commemoration of the friendship given to the Royal Regiment of Canadian Artillery while stationed in Hemer-Deilinghofen in the service of NATO. 1953–1970

- Canadian Forces
- Canadian Forces Land Force Command
- History of the Canadian Army
- List of armouries in Canada
- List of Canadian organizations with royal patronage
- Military history of Canada
- Monarchy of Canada
- Organization of Military Museums of Canada
- Supplementary Order of Battle
