= Supplementary Order of Battle =

Category of regiments

In the Canadian Army, the Supplementary Order of Battle is a category of regiments and (since 2026) divisions that are reduced to zero strength but continues to exist administratively. This is done when the need for the unit's continued operation is no longer relevant, and the regiment or division is re-manned only when the Department of National Defence deems the unit is required again. The Supplementary Order of Battle was instituted during the army rationalizations in the 1960s as an alternative to outright disbandment. If a regiment is re-manned and moved from the Supplementary Order of Battle, it takes its old place in the order of precedence and its colours, traditions and battle honours remain as if there had been no interruption of service.

In contrast, regiments that are completely disbanded are not placed on the Supplementary Order of Battle. For example, the Canadian Airborne Regiment was completely disbanded in the aftermath of the Somalia Affair in 1993, and is not placed on the Supplementary Order of Battle.

Three regiments have been removed from the Supplementary Order of Battle by amalgamating them with existing Primary Reserve units: the Irish Fusiliers of Canada (The Vancouver Regiment), on the order since 1965, was merged into the British Columbia Regiment (Duke of Connaught's Own) in 2002. The 19th Alberta Dragoons, also on the order since 1965, was merged into the South Alberta Light Horse in 2006. The Royal Rifles of Canada, on the order since 1966, was merged into the Voltigeurs de Québec in 2019.

On September 5, 2008, Canadian Defence Minister Peter MacKay announced that The Halifax Rifles (RCAC) would be reorganized as an active unit. The Halifax Rifles are the first, and so far only, regiment to rejoin the Primary Reserve from the Supplementary Order of Battle.

On September 10, 2026, the 3rd Canadian Division and the 4th Canadian Division were added to the Supplementary Order of Battle, being the first time in Canadian history that divisions were placed on the Supplementary Order of Battle.

== Divisions on the Supplementary Order of Battle ==
Division	Formed	To SOB	Headquarters
3rd Canadian Division	1915	2026	CFB Edmonton
4th Canadian Division	1916	2026	Denison Armoury

== Regiments on the Supplementary Order of Battle ==
=== Royal Canadian Armoured Corps ===
Armoured units on the Supplementary Order of Battle
Regiment	Formed	To SOB	Headquarters
4th Princess Louise Dragoon Guards	1875	1965	Ottawa
12th Manitoba Dragoons	1903	1964	Winnipeg
14th Canadian Hussars	1910	1968	Swift Current

=== Royal Regiment of Canadian Artillery ===
Regiment	Formed	To SOB	Headquarters
3rd Regiment, Royal Canadian Horse Artillery	1951	1992	Shilo, Manitoba
4th Regiment, Royal Canadian Horse Artillery	1952	1970	Petawawa, Ontario
8th Field Artillery Regiment, RCA	1912	1970	Hamilton, Ontario
12th Field Artillery Regiment, RCA	1905	1965	Fredericton, New Brunswick
14th Field Artillery Regiment, RCA	1912	1968	Yarmouth, Nova Scotia
18th Field Artillery Regiment, RCA	1920	1970	Lethbridge, Alberta
21st Field Artillery Regiment, RCA	1936	1970	Wingham, Ontario
24th Field Artillery Regiment, RCA	1914	1965	Trail, British Columbia
27th Field Artillery Regiment, RCA	1910	1970	Farnham, Quebec
29th Field Artillery Regiment, RCA	1898	1965	Sarnia, Ontario
34th Field Artillery Regiment, RCA	1942	1965	Montreal, Quebec
37th Field Artillery Regiment, RCA	1905	1965	Montreal, Quebec
39th Field Artillery Regiment (Self-Propelled), RCA	1914	1965	Winnipeg, Manitoba
40th Field Artillery Regiment, RCA	1936	1981	Kenora, Ontario
44th Field Artillery Regiment, RCA	1946	1965	St. Catharines, Ontario
46th Field Artillery Regiment, RCA	1936	1968	Drummondville, Quebec
50th Field Artillery Regiment (The Prince of Wales Rangers), RCA	1866	1970	Peterborough, Ontario
53rd Field Artillery Regiment, RCA	1946	1968	Yorkton, Saskatchewan
57th Field Artillery Regiment (2nd/10th Dragoons), RCA	1872	1970	Niagara Falls, Ontario
19th Medium Artillery Regiment, RCA	1920	1965	Calgary, Alberta
33rd Medium Artillery Regiment, RCA	1946	1965	Cobourg, Ontario
42nd Medium Artillery Regiment, RCA	1931	1965	Toronto, Ontario
1st Artillery Locating Regiment, RCA	1946	1965	Toronto, Ontario

=== Royal Canadian Infantry Corps ===
Infantry units on the Supplementary Order of Battle
Regiment	Formed	To SOB	Headquarters
Canadian Guards	1951	1970	Petawawa
Victoria Rifles of Canada	1862	1965	Montreal
Régiment de Joliette	1871	1964	Joliette
Perth Regiment	1886	1965	Stratford, Ontario
South Saskatchewan Regiment	1905	1968	Estevan
Winnipeg Grenadiers	1908	1965	Winnipeg
1st Battalion, Irish Regiment of Canada	1915	1965	Toronto
Yukon Regiment	1962	1968	Whitehorse, Yukon

== See also ==
- Canadian Militia
- Canadian Army
- Primary Reserve
- History of the Canadian Army
- Militia Act of 1855
- Otter Commission 1920
- National Defence Act 1923
- Kennedy Report on the Reserve Army 1954
- Unification of the Canadian Armed Forces 1968
