= 180th Battalion (Sportsmen), CEF =

The 180th (Sportsmen) Battalion, CEF was a unit in the Canadian Expeditionary Force during the First World War. Based in Toronto, Ontario, the unit began recruiting during the winter of 1915/16 in that city. After sailing to England in November 1916, the battalion was absorbed into the 3rd Reserve Battalion on January 6, 1917. The 180th (Sportsmen) Battalion, CEF had one Officer Commanding: Lieut-Col. R. H. Greer.
