= 15th Army Group =

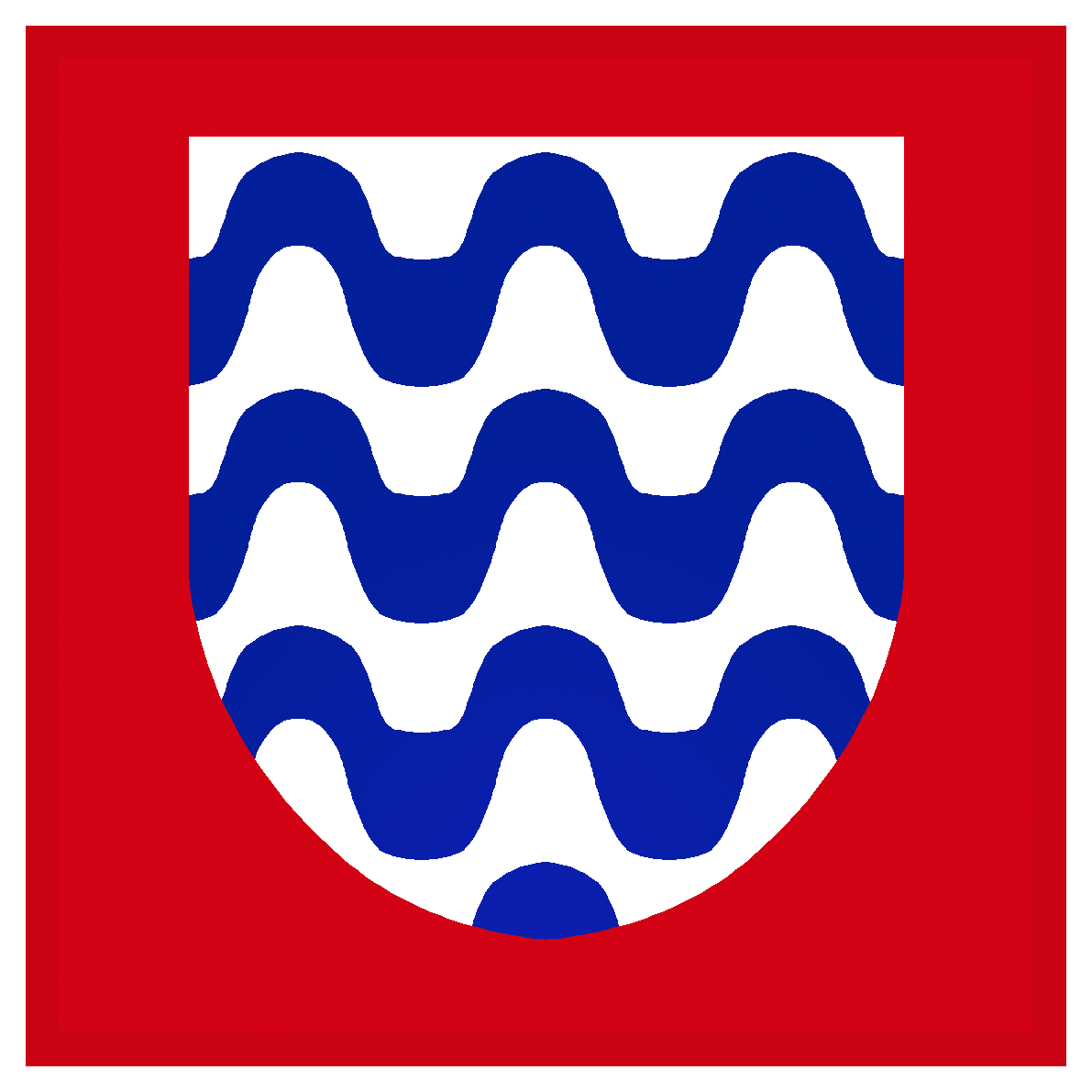
- Formation badge
- Active: 1943–45
- Countries: United States; British Empire; India; Italy; Canada; Poland; South Africa; Brazil; Free France; Greece
- Type: Army group
- Role: Headquarters
- Size: 1,200,000
- Part of: Allied Force Headquarters

Commanders
- Notable commanders: Harold Alexander; Mark W. Clark

The 15th Army Group was an army group in World War II, composed of the British Eighth Army and initially the Seventh United States Army (1943), replaced by the Fifth United States Army (from January 1944), which apart from units from across the British Empire and United States, also had entire units from other allied countries/regions, including: one corps from Free France and one from Poland; one division from Brazil; multiple separate brigades of Italians and Greeks; plus support to, and from, local Italian partisans. It operated in the Italian Campaign from 1943 to 1945.

== History ==
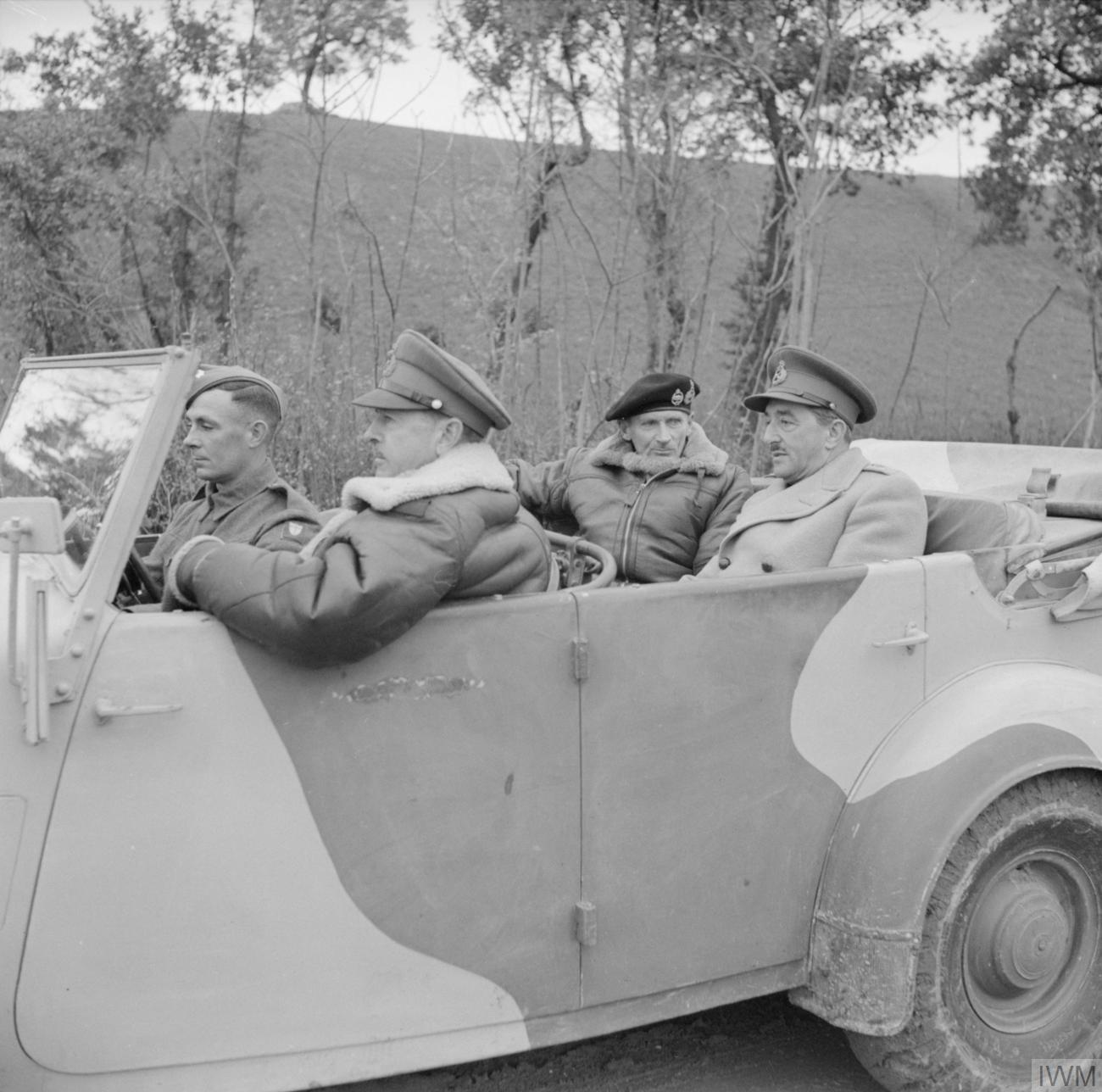
General Sir Bernard Montgomery in his staff car with General Sir Harold Alexander, commanding the 15th Army Group, and General Sir Alan Brooke, during an inspection of the headquarters of the 8th Indian Infantry Division, Italy, 15 December 1943.

The 15th Army Group was activated in 1943 in Algiers, North Africa, to plan the invasion of Sicily, codenamed Operation Husky. Its main forces for this job were the Seventh United States Army, under Lieutenant General George Patton, and the British Eighth Army, under General Bernard Montgomery. Following the capture of Sicily, the army group became responsible for the invasion of mainland Italy for which the U.S. Seventh Army was replaced by the U.S. Fifth Army, under Lieutenant General Mark W. Clark. In January 1944, the army group was re-designated successively Allied forces in Italy and then Allied Central Mediterranean Force.

In March 1944, the army group was renamed Allied Armies in Italy. Throughout this period, the army group was under command of the British General Sir Harold Alexander. By late 1944, the army group had pushed northward through Italy, capturing Rome, and driving the retreating Axis forces into Northern Italy. Despite and due to the rapid advance of the Allied forces in Italy in June–July 1944, after the liberation of Rome, the high allied command in Western Europe decided to take away from the Italian front the

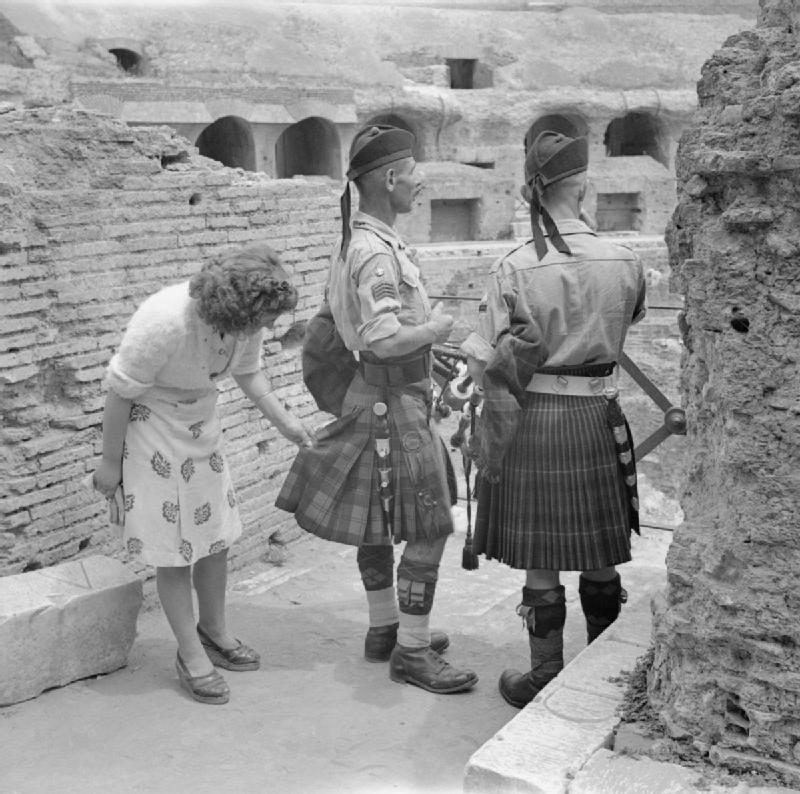
An Italian woman inspects Scottish troops in kilts in the Colosseum of Rome, 6 June 1944.

French Expeditionary Corps and the U.S. VI Corps, reassigned for landing in the South of France in support of the advance in the north of that country, and to liberate southern France, including the huge port complexes of Marseilles and Toulon, and bring into action the seven divisions of the French 1st Army (1st and 5th armoured, 1st, 2nd, 3rd, 4th, and 9th infantry) that had been reequipped in French North Africa by the United States. The gap in the ranks of the U.S. Fifth Army caused by the withdrawal of seven divisions (three US Army, the 3rd, 36th, and 45th infantry divisions; and four French, the 1st, 2nd, 3rd, and 4th divisions) was filled in 1944-45 by five US Army (10th Mountain, 85th, 88th, 91st, and 92nd infantry divisions) and one US-equipped Brazilian Army division (the 1st). Additional replacements and service elements were provided by conversion of the US Army's 2nd Cavalry Division, which had arrived in the theatre in 1944.

In order to complicate the Allied ambitions in Italy, between October 1944 and March 1945, the available British forces were also weakened by breaking up the 1st Armoured Division because of a lack of replacements for 8th Army's casualties, and the withdrawal and deployment to Greece of two British infantry divisions (4th and 46th), the British-controlled 4th Indian Division, the British 23rd Armoured Brigade, the British 2nd Parachute Brigade, and the Greek 3rd Mountain Brigade. In addition, the Canadian I Corps and the British 5th Infantry Division were withdrawn and redeployed to northwestern Europe in Operation Goldflake, to make up for British and Canadian losses in France and Belgium in 1944. The British and Canadian divisions that were withdrawn to shore up 21st Army Group took advantage of the ports in southern France liberated by the US 7th and French 1st armies in Operation Dragoon. The new gaps on the Italian front was filled by four Italian "combat groups," each equivalent to a "light" (two brigade) division under the British table of organization and equipment, additional US troops (detached from the forces in France or converted from army-level cavalry and anti-aircraft units) and one additional brigade made up largely of infantry recruited in the British Mandate of Palestine.

In December 1944, Alexander was made Supreme Commander of the Allied Forces Headquarters responsible for all military operations in the Mediterranean theatre and Lieutenant General Mark Clark became the new commander and the army group was renamed 15th Army Group once again. After the definitive break up of the Gothic Line, the Axis forces in Italy were finally defeated in the 15th Army Group's spring offensive, with Axis forces surrendering on 2 May 1945. On 5 July, 15 Army Group was reorganized and redesignated the U.S. Occupational Forces Austria.

== Order of battle ==
Order of Battle for 15th Army Group, August 1944-April 1945

- 15th Army Group - (General Sir Harold Alexander)
  - British Eighth Army - (Lieutenant-General Sir Oliver Leese)
    - British V Corps (Lieutenant-General Charles Keightley)
      - British 1st Armoured Division - (Major-General Richard Hull)
      - British 4th Infantry Division - (Major-General Alfred Dudley Ward)
      - 4th Indian Infantry Division - (Major-General Arthur Holworthy)
      - British 46th Infantry Division - (Major-General John Hawkesworth)
      - British 56th Infantry Division - (Major-General John Yeldham Whitfield)
      - British 25th Tank Brigade (Brigadier James Noel Tetley)
      - Italian Combat Group "Cremona"
      - Jewish Brigade (Brigadier Ernest Benjamin)
    - I Canadian Corps - (Lieutenant-General E. L. M. Burns)
      - 1st Canadian Infantry Division - (Major-General Christopher Vokes)
      - 2nd New Zealand Division - (Lieutenant-General Bernard Freyberg, 1st Baron Freyberg)
      - 5th Canadian Armoured Division - (Major-General Bert Hoffmeister)
      - 3rd Greek Mountain Brigade - (Lieutenant General Thrasyvoulos Tsakalotos)
      - British 21st Tank Brigade
      - 1st Canadian Armoured Brigade (Brigadier Robert Andrew Wyman, later Brigadier William Cameron Murphy)
    - II Polish Corps - (Lieutenant General Władysław Anders)
      - 3rd Carpathian Infantry Division - (Major-General Bronisław Duch)
      - 5th Kresowa Infantry Division - (Major-General Nikodem Sulik)
      - 2nd Armoured Brigade
    - British X Corps - (Lieutenant-General Sir Richard McCreery)
      - 10th Indian Infantry Division - (Major-General Denys Reid)
      - Italian Combat Group "Friuli"
      - British 9th Armoured Brigade
    - Italian Co-belligerent Army - (Lieutenant General Paolo Berardi)
      - Italian Combat Group "Mantova"
      - Italian Combat Group "Piceno"
  - US Fifth Army - (Lieutenant General Mark W. Clark)
    - US II Corps - (Major General Geoffrey Keyes)
      - 34th Infantry Division - (Major General Charles L. Bolte)
      - 88th Infantry Division - (Major General Paul W. Kendall)
      - 91st Infantry Division - (Major General William G. Livesay)
      - Italian Combat Group "Legnano"
    - US IV Corps - (Major General Willis D. Crittenberger)
      - 6th South African Armoured Division - (Major General Evered Poole)
      - 85th Infantry Division - (Major General John B. Coulter)
      - 92nd Infantry Division - (Major General Edward Almond)
        - 442nd Regimental Combat Team - (Colonel Virgil R. Miller)
      - 1st Brazilian Infantry Division - (Major General Mascarenhas de Morais)
      - 10th Mountain Division - (Major General George Price Hays)
    - British XIII Corps - (Lieutenant-General Sidney Kirkman)
      - British 1st Infantry Division - (Major-General Charles Loewen)
      - British 6th Armoured Division - (Major-General Horatius Murray)
      - 8th Indian Infantry Division - (Major-General Dudley Russell)
      - Italian Combat Group "Folgore"
    - Army Group Reserve
      - US 1st Armored Division - (Major General Vernon Prichard)
  - Italian resistance movement

== Bibliography ==
- Doherty, Richard. "Victory in Italy, 15th Army Group's Final Campaign 1945" Pen & Sword Books Ltd 2015 ISBN 9781783462988
- Vigneras, Marcel "Rearming the French" CENTER OF MILITARY HISTORY, UNITED STATES ARMY, WASHINGTON, D.C., 1989 {Library of Congress-CMH_Pub_11-6}
- Fisher, Ernest F "Cassino to the Alps" CENTER OF MILITARY HISTORY, UNITED STATES ARMY, WASHINGTON, D.C., 1989 {Library of Congress-CMH_Pub_6-4-1}
