= Pacific Coast Militia Rangers =

- Active: 1942-1945
- Disbanded: 1945
- Country: Canada
- Type: Rangers
- Role: Home defence Defence from invasion surveillance scouting coast-watching search and rescue wilderness survival
- Size: 138 companies
- Part of: Canadian Army Pacific Command
- Motto: Vigilans (Latin for 'the watchers')
- Engagements: Second World War

Commanders
- Notable commanders: Lieutenant Colonel Cyrus Wesley Peck, VC, DSO

The Pacific Coast Militia Rangers (PCMR) was a volunteer home-defence force active in British Columbia and the Yukon supporting the Canadian Army during the Second World War. The Rangers were first formed in early March 1942 amid fears of Japanese attacks on Canada’s Pacific coast. Similar to that of the British Home Guard, the Rangers recruited men who knew remote terrain to patrol, observe, and support local defence. Following the end of the war, the Rangers were stood down on 30 September 1945.

== Origins ==
Following Japan’s attack on Pearl Harbor and Canada’s declaration of war against Japan, British Columbians pressured the federal government to strengthen coastal defences. The Army initially organized the force as the Coastal Defence Guards, before recognizing it as the Pacific Coast Militia Rangers.

The PCMR was designed for conditions that conventional local militia units were not well suited to: rugged, forested, and sparsely populated coastal country. It drew on the older North American “Ranger” tradition of small, mobile, lightly disciplined units using scouting, observation, and guerrilla-style tactics.

== Organization and personnel ==
The Rangers were unpaid volunteers, many of whom were too young or too old for overseas service, medically unfit for regular enlistment, or employed in essential industries such as fishing, logging, mining, trapping, prospecting, and ranching. Their local knowledge of terrain, waterways, and remote routes was central to their intended role. Beyond military preparedness, the organization served a civilian morale function: it gave people excluded from overseas service a way to contribute, reassured rural communities, and reinforced public support for the war effort.

Overall organization, training, and direction of the PCMR was held by Canadian Army Pacific Command. At the top, Lieutenant-Colonel Thomas A.H. “Tommy” Taylor had responsibility for organizing and training the Rangers, supported by a small Pacific Command headquarters staff. The force’s companies were geographically dispersed across British Columbia and Yukon, which made centralized command difficult and placed substantial authority in local leaders.

== PCMR Companies ==
The PCMR was organized into companies, platoons, and sections. A company could have a headquarters and up to five platoons and was led by a Ranger Captain. Each platoon contained up to 30 other ranks and was commanded by a Reserve Militia Lieutenant. Sections were commanded by Sergeants. At its height, the PCMR had about 15,000 volunteers organized into 138 companies, under three principal patrol areas: Vancouver Island, the Lower Fraser Valley, and the Bridge River area. The force also extended into Yukon, reaching as far as Dawson City.

== Ranks ==
	Officers							Other Ranks							
PCMR Rank	No equivalent	No equivalent	Lieutenant Colonel	Major	Captain	Lieutenant	No equivalent	No equivalent	Company Sergeant Major (CSM)	Staff Sergeant	Sergeant	No equivalent	Corporal	Lance Corporal	Private
Insignia															No Insignia
Canadian Army equivalents	Brigadier	Colonel	Lieutenant Colonel	Major	Captain	Lieutenant	Second Lieutenant	Warrant Officer Class I/Regimental Sergeant Major (RSM)	Warrant Officer Class II/Company Sergeant Major (CSM)	Staff Sergeant	Sergeant	Lance Sergeant	Corporal	Lance Corporal	Private

== Duties and training ==
Rangers conducted coast-watching and military surveillance while carrying on their ordinary work, reported suspicious vessels or activity, and were prepared to guide or delay enemy forces in the event of an invasion. They also took part in search-and-rescue work and reported Japanese balloon bombs that reached the British Columbia coast.

Training emphasized rifle marksmanship, observation, anti-sabotage measures, protection of transport and communication routes, and local defence against minor raids. Because companies were dispersed across remote communities, many members could not attend centralized training; the Army therefore issued The Ranger, a training publication first circulated on 1 September 1942, with practical articles on shooting, edible plants, fieldcraft, and improvised shelter.

== Equipment ==
Early shortages of suitable uniforms and weapons affected the force. Equipment later standardized around .303 rifles, steel helmets, armbands, and weather-resistant clothing suited to the coastal climate.

Some members also used American lever-action rifles, including Winchester Model 94 and Model 64 rifles and Marlin Model 1936 rifles, alongside surplus First World War-era M1917 Enfield rifles, Ross rifles, and later Sten guns.

== Disbandment and legacy ==
The PCMR never engaged enemy forces in combat. After Japan’s surrender, it was stood down at a ceremony at Brockton Point Oval in Vancouver on 30 September 1945. At the ceremony, Major General F.F. Worthington noted that, “the citizens of this country owe you a great debt of gratitude for the services you have rendered in the defence of their homes.”

Its legacy continued through the Canadian Rangers, formally established on 23 May 1947 to provide a military presence in Canada’s remote northern, coastal, and isolated regions. The modern Rangers retain the PCMR motto, Vigilans (“vigilant”), and inherit its emphasis on local knowledge, surveillance, and service in communities distant from conventional military infrastructure.

== Media ==
- Pacific Coast Militia Rangers

== See also ==
- Veterans Guard of Canada
- Home Guard (United Kingdom)
- Auxiliary Units
- Volunteer Defence Corps (Australia)
- Coastwatchers
- Home Guard (New Zealand)
- Japanese balloon bombs
