= Pacific Command =

Pacific Command may refer to:

- Pacific Command (Canadian Army), a formation of the Canadian Army created during the Second World War
- United States Indo-Pacific Command (previously United States Pacific Command), a unified combatant command of the United States Armed Forces
