= 1st Canadian Armoured Brigade =

Brigade of the Canadian Army

1st Canadian Army Tank Brigade; 1st Canadian Armoured Brigade (Independent)
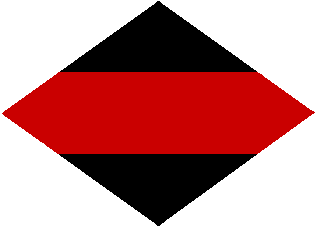
- Brigade formation patch: late 1942 – 1945
- Active: 4 February 1941 – 15 September 1945
- Country: Canada
- Branch: Canadian Army
- Type: Armoured
- Role: Armoured support for infantry units
- Size: Brigade
- Part of: British Eighth Army; U.S. Fifth Army; First Canadian Army

Commanders
- Notable commanders: Frederic Franklin Worthington; Robert Andrew Wyman; William Cameron Murphy

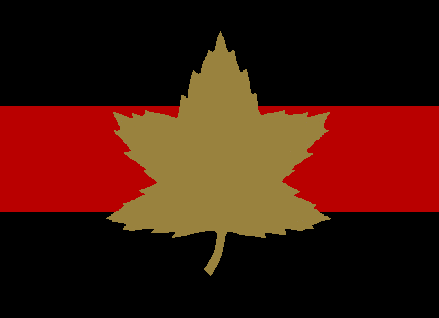
The formation sign used to identify tanks and other vehicles in the 1st Canadian Armoured Brigade.

The 1st Canadian Army Tank Brigade, later known as 1st Canadian Armoured Brigade (Independent), was an armoured brigade of the Canadian Army, raised during the Second World War. The brigade was composed of the 11th Ontario, 12th Three Rivers and 14th Calgary Armoured Regiments and saw service in the Italian campaign and later in north-west Europe. It was one of only two independent Canadian armoured brigades in combat, the other being 2nd Canadian Armoured Brigade (Independent).

== History ==
The 1st Canadian Army Tank Brigade was formed on 4 February 1941. The Ontario Regiment and the Three Rivers Regiment were transferred from the 1st Canadian (Armoured) Division's 1st Canadian Armoured Brigade to provide the nucleus of the newly formed army tank brigade in February 1941. In March, the Calgary Regiment joined the new independent army tank brigade as the brigade's junior regiment. The Fort Garry Horse, part of 1st Canadian Armoured Brigade once alongside the Ontario Regiment and the Three Rivers Regiment, and was joined by the new replacements transferred to the 1st Canadian Armoured Brigade, 1st Canadian (Armoured) Division in May 1941, being Lord Strathcona's Horse and 1st Hussars. The division was later renamed to 5th Canadian (Armoured) Division on 26 June 1941.

The Canadian Armoured Corps followed the same brigade structuring as the Royal Armoured Corps. An army tank brigade was a corps headquarters asset consisting of heavily armoured and slow infantry tanks, which in summer 1941 for the Canadians meant the Churchill tank, while an armoured brigade was a core component of an armoured division, consisting of lighter armoured and faster cruiser tanks alongside a motor battalion (motorized infantry) being part of the brigade as well. For the Canadians in summer 1941 the cruiser tank model that equipped 1st and 2nd Canadian Armoured Brigades in 5th Canadian (Armoured) Division were Valentine tanks.

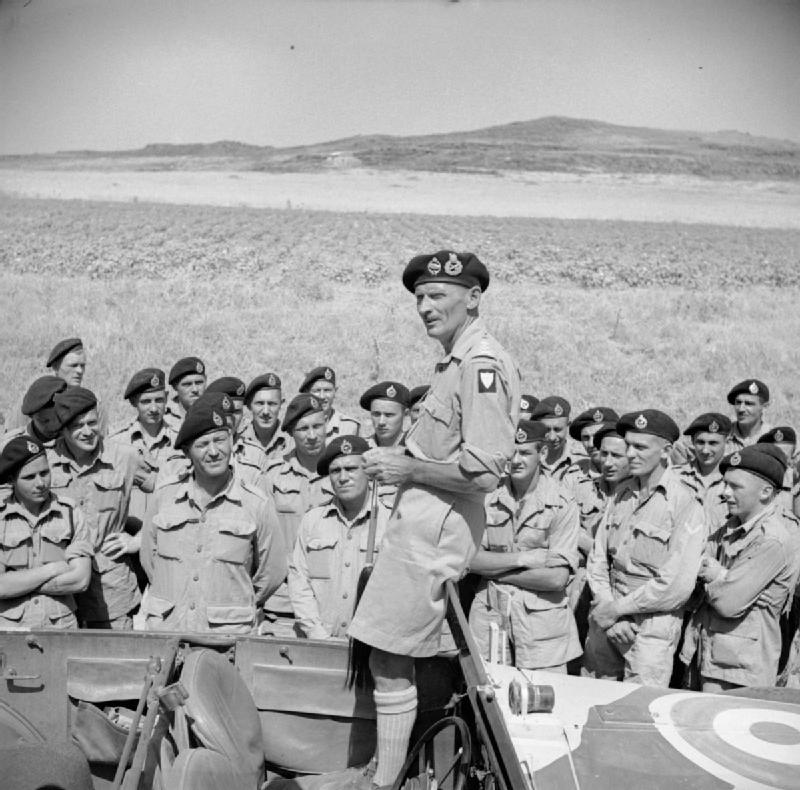
General Sir Bernard Montgomery, commander of the British Eighth Army, addresses officers and men of the 11th Army Tank Regiment (The Ontario Regiment (Tank)) near Lentini, Sicily, 25 July 1943.

The 1st Canadian Army Tank Brigade moved to the United Kingdom in the summer of 1941; personnel arrived in the Clyde on 30 June and were promptly moved to the Salisbury Plain Training Area where they were issued sufficient Churchill tanks for training. The Calgary Regiment participated in the disastrous Dieppe landing in 1942 being the first unit of the Canadian Armoured Corps to see combat during the Second World War. Issued brand new M4 Sherman tanks, the entire brigade moved to the Mediterranean, with the Three Rivers Regiment participating in the assault landing at Pachino. The remainder of the brigade landed with the follow-up convoy of 13 July and served alongside the Three Rivers Regiment for the final weeks of the Allied invasion of Sicily. The 1st Canadian Army Tank Brigade's role in the latter operations was largely one of fire support, the rugged terrain limiting the role of the armoured corps. The fight for Sicily ended with 1st Canadian Army Tank Brigade in reserve. Preparing for Operation Baytown, the Allied invasion of Italy, it was redesignated 1st Canadian Armoured Brigade (Independent) 26 August 1943. Although reorganized as an armoured brigade, no motor battalion served under command. Having established a reputation for both courage and skill, the Canadian tankers were in constant demand by senior British commanders. The previous 1st Canadian Armoured Brigade had cease to exist since 1 January 1943 in the reorganization of armoured divisions from two armoured brigades to one armoured brigade supported by one infantry brigade. In 5th Canadian (Armoured) Division this saw 1st Canadian Armoured Brigade basically be fully dissolved as it re-raised as the second iteration of the 11th Canadian Infantry Brigade in this war. The 2nd Canadian Armoured Brigade was simply renamed to 5th Canadian Armoured Brigade and continued to serve as that divisions armoured brigade until the war's end.

The brigade took part in the landings of the Eighth Army on the toe of Italy in Operation Baytown in September 1943. Its regiments participated in the Battles of Potenza, Termoli, Ortona. During the fourth and final Battle of Monte Cassino in May 1944, the brigade helped break the Winter Line (Gustav Line), crossing the Gari River in support of the 8th Indian Division. Its regiments helped the 1st Canadian Division and the 78th Division in breaking the Hitler Line. It cooperated with the XIII Corps in the Battle of Lake Trasimeno. It was active in the crossing of the Arno River and later fought on the Gothic Line.

Combined with the 1st Canadian Infantry Division and 5th Canadian Armoured Division as part of I Canadian Corps, the 1st Canadian Armoured Brigade (Independent) was moved from the Italian Front and joined the First Canadian Army in Northern Europe at the beginning of 1945. Here it participated in the crossing of the IJssel River. In its two incarnations as 1st Canadian Army Tank Brigade and 1st Canadian Armoured Brigade (Independent), the brigade's service at Dieppe, France, in Sicily, Italy and northwest Europe earned it the distinction of the longest and widest service of any brigade of the Canadian Army during the Second World War.

== Organization ==
The battle order starting 4 February 1941:

- 1st Canadian Armoured Brigade Headquarters Squadron (The Prince Edward Island Light Horse, until 1 November 1943)
- 11th Armoured Regiment (The Ontario Regiment)
- 12th Armoured Regiment (Three Rivers Regiment)
- 14th Armoured Regiment (Calgary Regiment)
- "A" Squadron, 25th Armoured Delivery Regiment (The Elgin Regiment) (later "B" Squadron)
- 1st Canadian Armoured Brigade Signals, Royal Canadian Corps of Signals
- 1st Canadian Armoured Brigade No. 83 Company, RCASC
- 1st Canadian Light Field Ambulance, RCAMC
- 1st Canadian Armoured Brigade Workshop, RCEME
- 1st Canadian Armoured Brigade Ordnance Field Park, RCOC
- 1st Canadian Heavy Recovery Troop, RCEME
- 1st Canadian Armoured Brigade Workshop, RCEME
- 1st Canadian Assault Troop, CAC (Added 1 June, 1944)

== Brigade Commanders ==
- Vacant (4 February - 4 March 1941)
- Brigadier F. F. Worthington (5 March 1941 – 28 January 1942)
- Vacant (29 January - 1 February 1942)
- Brigadier R.A. Wyman (2 February 1942 – 26 February 1944)
- Brigadier W.C. Murphy (27 February 1944 – 25 June 1945)
