= Pacific Command Water Transport Company, RCASC =

Pacific Command - Water Transport Company - (Royal Canadian Army Service Corps)
- Active: 1942 to 1945
- Country: Canada
- Branch: Canadian Army
- Role: Water-borne Freight Hauling, Maritime Patrol
- Weapons: Twin Mounted Lewis guns,.303 Lee–Enfield rifles,.303

The Pacific Command Water Transport Company, RCASC, was a secret freight-patrol shipping unit of the Canadian Army based at Vancouver, British Columbia, during the Second World War. The unit fell under the jurisdiction of Pacific Command, the Canadian Army formation responsible for defending the Pacific Coast of Canada against Japanese attack.

== History ==
Based at the Old Vancouver Hotel and the RCASC wharf (Vancouver) under the command of Major C.G. Matthews, the Pacific Command Water Transport Company of the Royal Canadian Army Service Corps was formed in 1942, utilizing fishing packers and seiners leased from local civilians for army use. The company was tasked with resupplying camps established to build a telephone line from British Columbia to Dutch Harbor, Alaska, after the Aleutian Islands Attu and Kiska were occupied by Japanese Imperial Forces. Upon completion of the communication link, the Water Transport Company was assigned with resupplying freight and personnel to remote Royal Canadian Air Force radar stations on the west coast of British Columbia, basing ships at Coal Harbour, Port Alberni, and Prince Rupert. The company maintained an estimated 70 vessels (including scows) in its order-of-battle, each motor vessel mounted with a twin-Lewis Gun .303 battery and Lee–Enfield rifles for all crewmembers, usually eight other-ranks soldiers.

On 6 March 1945, after the munitions freighter Greenhill Park exploded in Vancouver harbour, the MV General Kennedy, MV General Mackenzie, MV Brigadier Sutherland Brown, and MV General Cotton (skippered by Warrant Officer 'Dutchy' Knox) rendered assistance, towing the stricken vessel to outer harbour in preparation for beaching. The company also towed targets for Royal Canadian Artillery coastal gunnery practice. Ships in the Water Transport Company, RCASC, sailed under their own distinctive flag, a maritime blue ensign with crossed swords on the fly. The company was disbanded in 1945.

== Ships ==
- MLC No. 42
- MV Anna M (Z49) (Skipper: G. Wilson)
- MV Brigadier Sutherland Brown
- MV Brigadier D.J. Macdonald
- MV Colonel Greer
- MV Colonel Holmes
- MV Colonel Lawson
- MV Colonel Ogilvy
- MV Colonel Peters
- MV Colonel Roy
- MV Colonel Stuart
- MV Colonel Wadmore
- MV Colonel Ward
- MV Colonel Robinson
- MV General Anderson (Z27)
- MV General Cotton (Z72) (Skipper: W.O. 'Dutchy' Knox)
- MV General Hertzberg
- MV General Kennedy
- MV General Lake
- MV General Leckie
- MV General Mackenzie
- MV Good Partner
- MV Lady Rose
- PPL 42
- PPL 45
- PPL 144
- RCASC No. 2 (scow)
- RCASC No. 5
- RCASC No. 6
- RCASC No. 9
- RCASC No. 10
- RCASC No. 23 (range target-towing speed boat; 24 knots [44 km/h; 28 mph])
- RCASC No. 26

== See also ==
- Pacific Command (Canadian Army)

== Sources ==
- Cliff Faulknor, RCASC, The Unknown Service (unpublished), 2002
- Library and Archives Canada File No. 3225 War Diary of Pacific Command Water Transport Company, RCASC, Ottawa, 1945.
- Knight, Darrell The West Coast Privateers: a History of the Pacific Command "WATER TRANSPORT COMPANY" of the Royal Canadian Army Service Corps (300-page manuscript, unpublished) Calgary, 2008
