= F. F. Worthington =

- Born: Frederic Franklin Worthington; 17 September 1889; Peterhead, Scotland
- Died: 8 December 1967 (aged 78); Ottawa, Ontario, Canada
- Military career
- Allegiance: Canada
- Branch: Canadian Army
- Service years: 1915–1948
- Rank: Major General
- Nicknames: "Worthy" "Fighting Frank"
- Commands: Pacific Command (1945–46); Camp Borden (1944–45); 4th Canadian (Armoured) Division (1942–44); 1st Canadian Tank Brigade (1941–42); Canadian Armoured Fighting Vehicle Training Centre (1939–40)
- Conflicts: Mexican Civil War; First World War; Second World War
- Awards: Companion of the Order of the Bath; Military Cross & Bar; Military Medal & Bar; Canadian Forces' Decoration

Major-General Frederic Franklin Worthington, CB, MC & Bar, MM & Bar, CD (17 September 1889 – 8 December 1967), nicknamed "Worthy" and "Fighting Frank", was a senior Canadian Army officer. He is considered the father of the Royal Canadian Armoured Corps.

== Early life and career ==
Worthington was born in Peterhead, Scotland. His military career began, somewhat unofficially, as a mercenary. He served in the Nicaraguan Army in the war against San Salvador and Honduras, but when the Nicaraguan Republican government fell, the army dissolved and Worthington left the country to avoid capture. He later found work sailing on cargo steamers.

The life of a mercenary was appealing to Worthington, and he soon found himself gunrunning to Cuba, for which he was imprisoned in Cuba in 1908. In 1913, Worthington fought on the side of Francisco Madero in the Mexican Civil War against the Diaz government. His war service was short-lived, however, as he was wounded in a battle.

Worthington served in the Canadian Machine Gun Corps in 1917. He was awarded the Military Medal for actions near Vimy Ridge, on 6 January 1917 for holding his position during a German advance. He was later awarded a bar to his MM.

After the First World War, Worthington was a proponent of adopting armoured fighting vehicles. As a captain, Worthington took an eight-month course in the Canadian Armoured Fighting Vehicle School at Camp Borden in 1930, equipped with twelve Carden Loyd machine gun carriers. In 1936, then Major Worthington became an instructor at the Royal Tank School in Bovington Camp near Dorset, England, returning to Borden to assume the post of Commandant of the Canadian Armoured Fighting Vehicle School in 1938. Thanks to Worthington's determination, Canada acquired its first tanks in 1938: two Vickers light tanks, and ten more the following year.

== Second World War ==
In 1940, the Canadian Armoured Corps was formally established (the Royal prefix was granted in 1945). As its first senior officer, Colonel Worthington bought 265 US-built M1917 tanks of First World War vintage to use in training. Because U.S. neutrality laws prohibited the sale of weapons to Canada, these antiques were bought for $120 each as scrap metal from the Rock Island Arsenal by the "Camp Borden Iron Foundry". During the Second World War Worthington organized the 1st Canadian Tank Brigade (later the 1st Canadian Armoured Brigade, an independent formation) and then converted the 4th Canadian Infantry Division to an armoured division in only five months. The division served overseas under the designation 4th Canadian (Armoured) Division and included the 4th Canadian Armoured Brigade and the 10th Canadian Infantry Brigade.

In early 1944, Worthington was forced to relinquish command of the 4th Armoured Division, "officially" due to poor health, but in fact it was due to changes in Canada's Army commanders. Worthington supported Lieutenant-General Andrew McNaughton, but it was Lieutenant-General Guy Simonds who got command of II Canadian Corps. Worthington was simply edged out in favour of others. It was the biggest regret of his career that he never commanded a division in war. Simonds would later admit that he had made a mistake taking Worthington's command away from him.

In 1944 he returned to Canada to administer Camp Borden, where replacements were trained for the Canadian Armoured Corps and Infantry, as well as the Royal Canadian Army Service Corps and the Canadian Provost Corps. Worthy soon discovered that other things had changed since he left in 1942. Black market selling was out of control by this time, with fuel, food and building materials being the hot items. Worthington had an unconventional method of stopping the stolen items from leaving the camp. He posted provost marshals at the gates to search vehicles leaving, forcing the thieves to take the back roads and trails to get out of camp. Worthington had the engineers dig trenches to make it impossible for vehicles to get through. The most unconventional method, however, was having the engineers lay landmines on the back trails, with the trigger points set back about 50 yards, thus ensuring that no one would actually get hurt. The troops got the message though, as no one wanted to take any chances with a commander who mined roadways.

Worthington served as General Officer Commander in Chief of Pacific Command from 1 April 1945 to 26 January 1946. Later he was appointed the first Colonel-Commandant of the Royal Canadian Armoured Corps.

== Later life ==
Worthington died on 8 December 1967 at Ottawa's Military Hospital. After his funeral in Ottawa, his body was flown by a RCAF Caribou aircraft to Camp Borden and in accordance with his wishes, was interred in Worthington Park. Four Centurion tanks fired a 13 gun salute and three RCAF Chipmunk aircraft did a low-level "fly-past".

The Major-General F.F. Worthington Memorial Park is also home to the tank collection of the Base Borden Military Museum. The Worthington Trophy for best Canadian armoured regiment was named after him.

Military offices
Preceded by Lionel Frank Page	GOC 4th Canadian (Armoured) Division; 1942–1944	Succeeded by George Kitching
