= Base Borden Military Museum =

Coordinates: 44.290°N 79.893°W

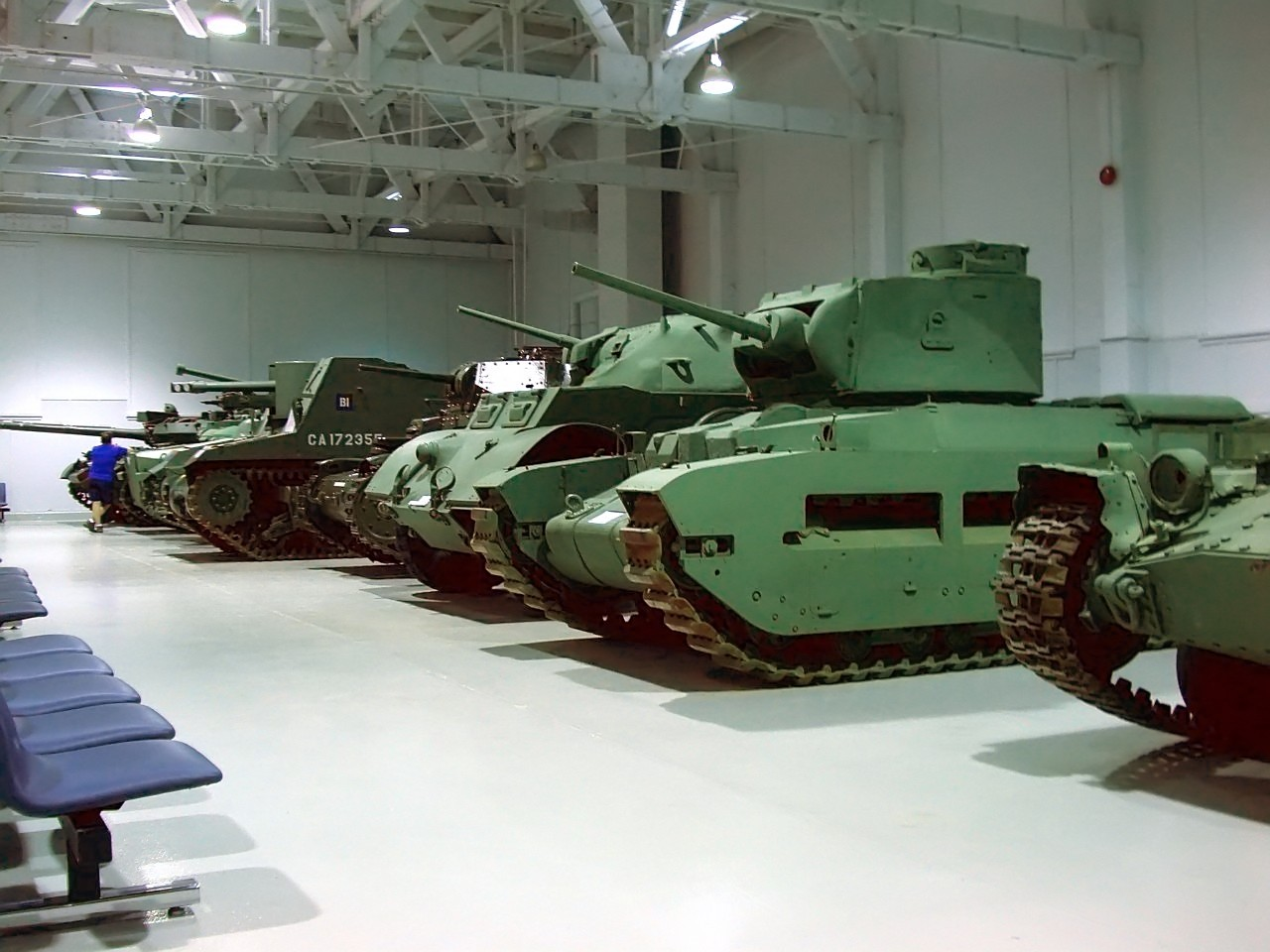
- Vehicles on display inside the museum
- Established: 1970
- Location: CFB Borden, Borden, Ontario, Canada
- Type: Military museum
- Website: https://cfmws.ca/borden/facilities/borden-military-museum

Base Borden Military Museum is a military museum located on the grounds of CFB Borden, in Borden, Ontario, Canada. Combining seven separate collections, it has numerous items, equipment and vehicles from all eras of Canadian military history, including a large number of historic armored vehicles and aircraft displayed outside in the Major-General F. F. Worthington Memorial Park and around the base.

The museum is located just south of Angus, Ontario. The museum, which combines all the separate museums at the base, was established in the 1970s. These included the Worthington Collection and the RCEME Corps Collection.

In June 2007 a new main building for the museum complex was opened, with a large hangar for the display of historic military vehicles. The museum complex consists of several buildings and 2 memorial parks as well as an Arboretum. It also operates an the Air Annex focused on the RCAF history in Hangar 11.

Hangar 11 was reopened in April 2024 after a renovation.

The Museum is affiliated with: CMA, CHIN, OMMC and Virtual Museum of Canada.

== Gallery ==
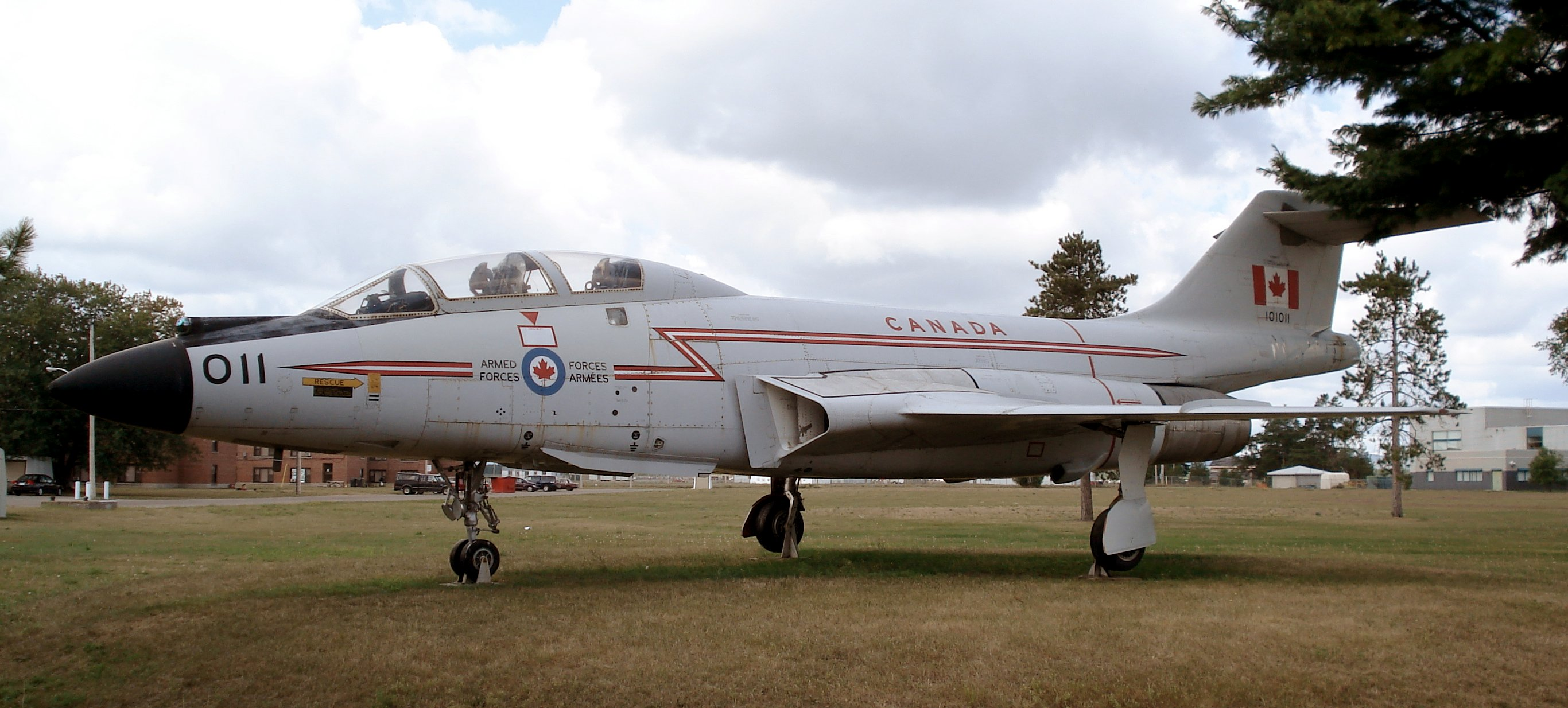
Canadian CF-101 Voodoo interceptor

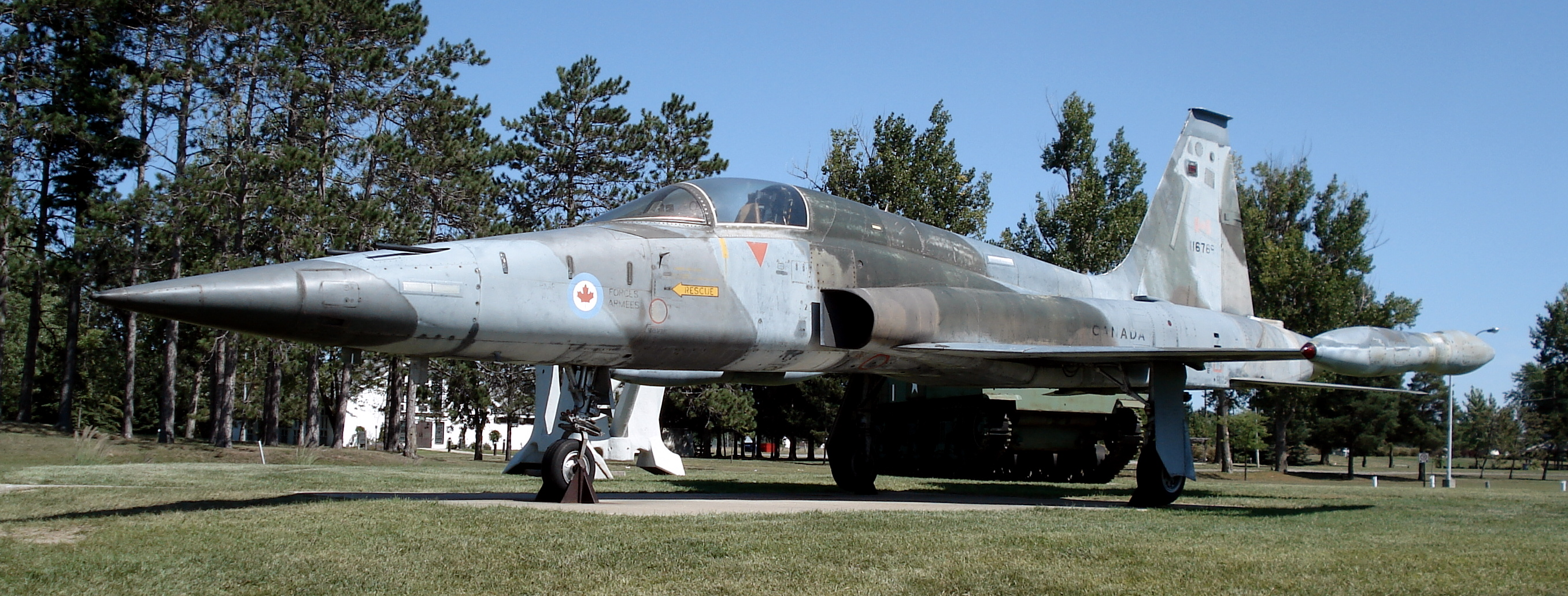
Canadian CF-116 fighter

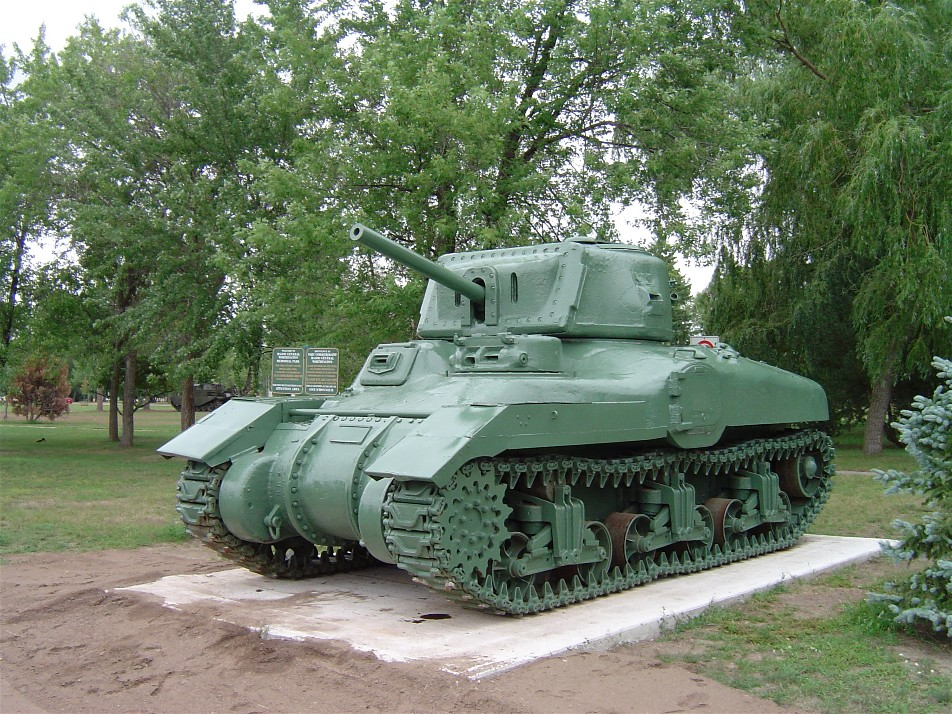
Canadian Ram tank

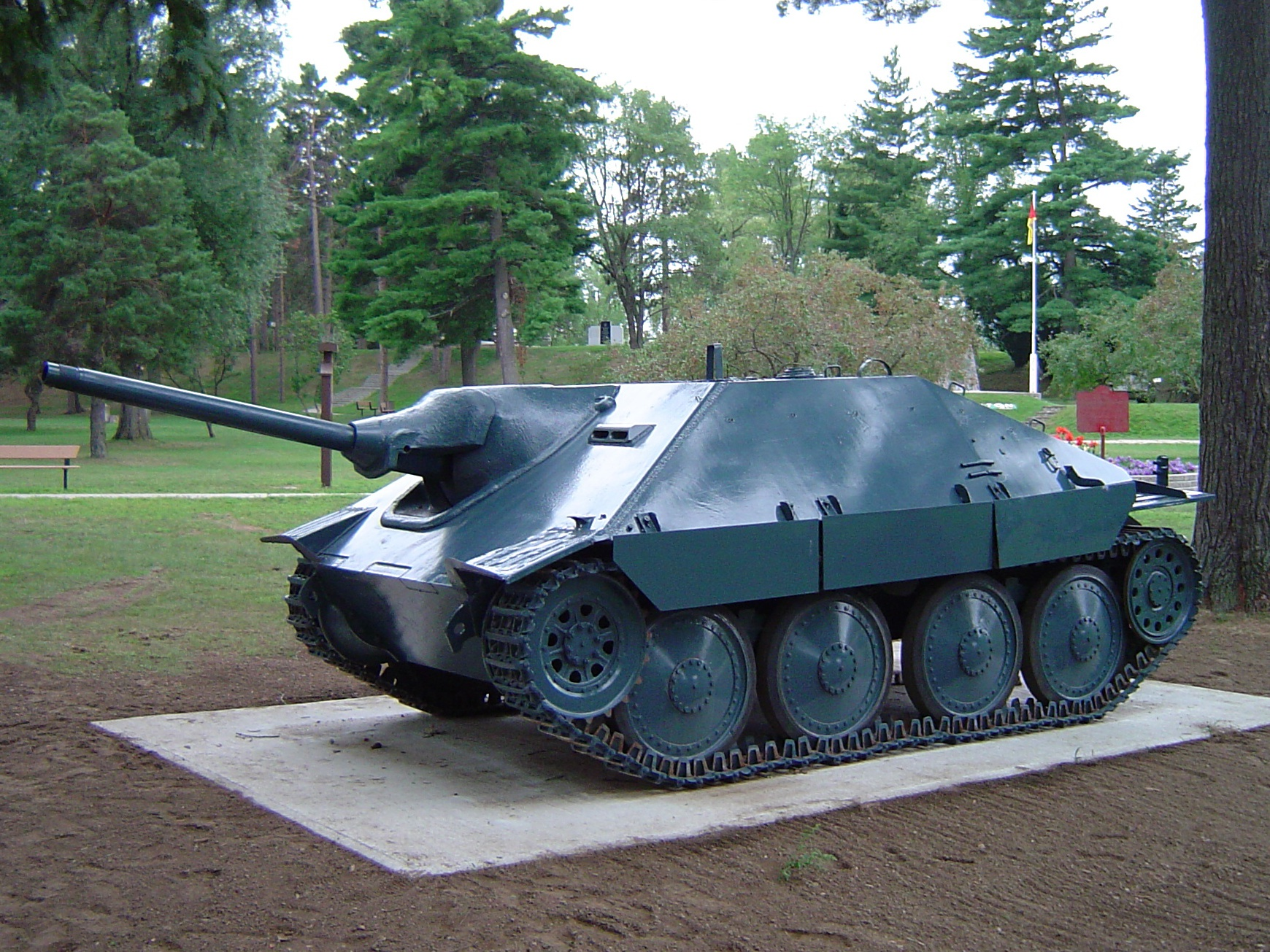
German Hetzer tank destroyer

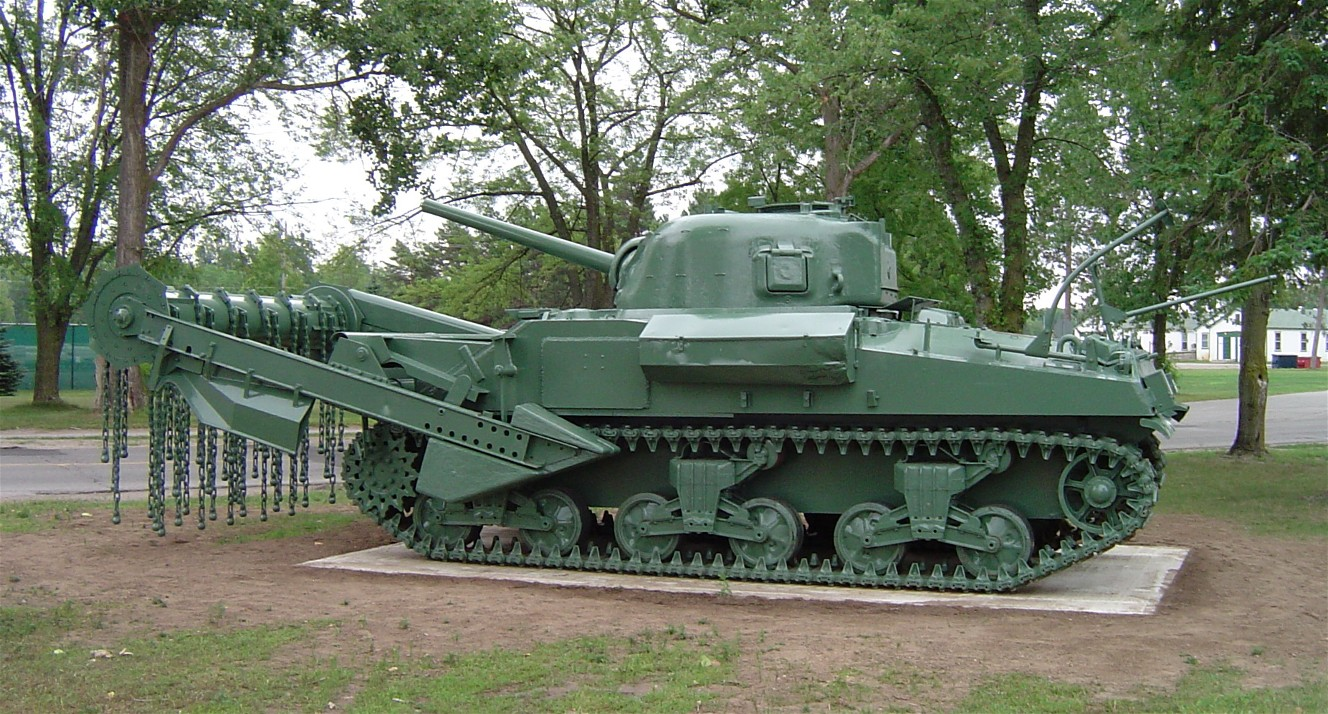
Crab flail tank

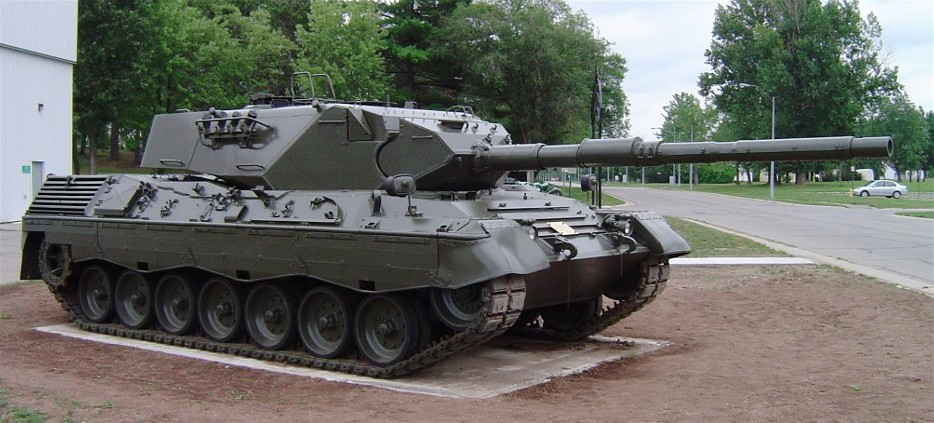
German Leopard 1 tank (A4 model, not a Canadian Leopard C1)

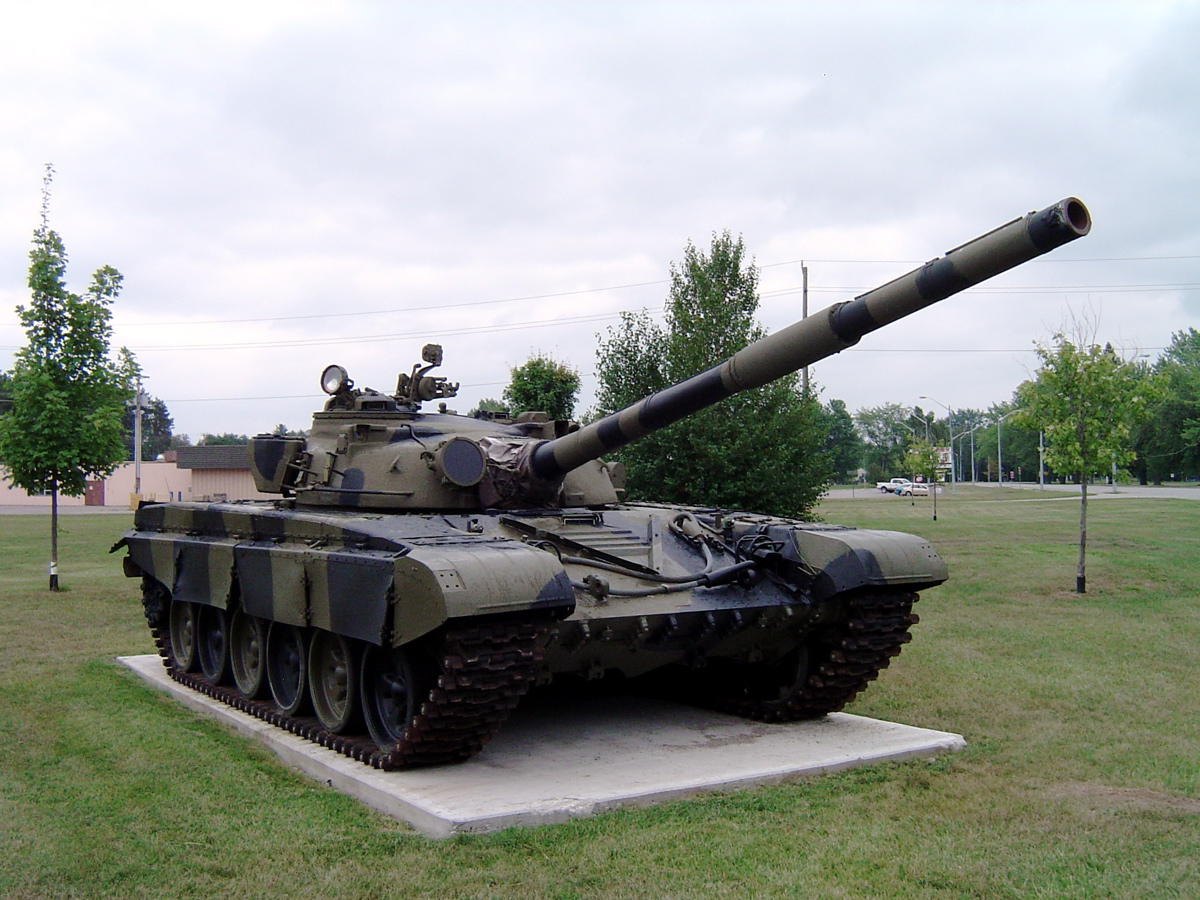
Soviet T-72 tank

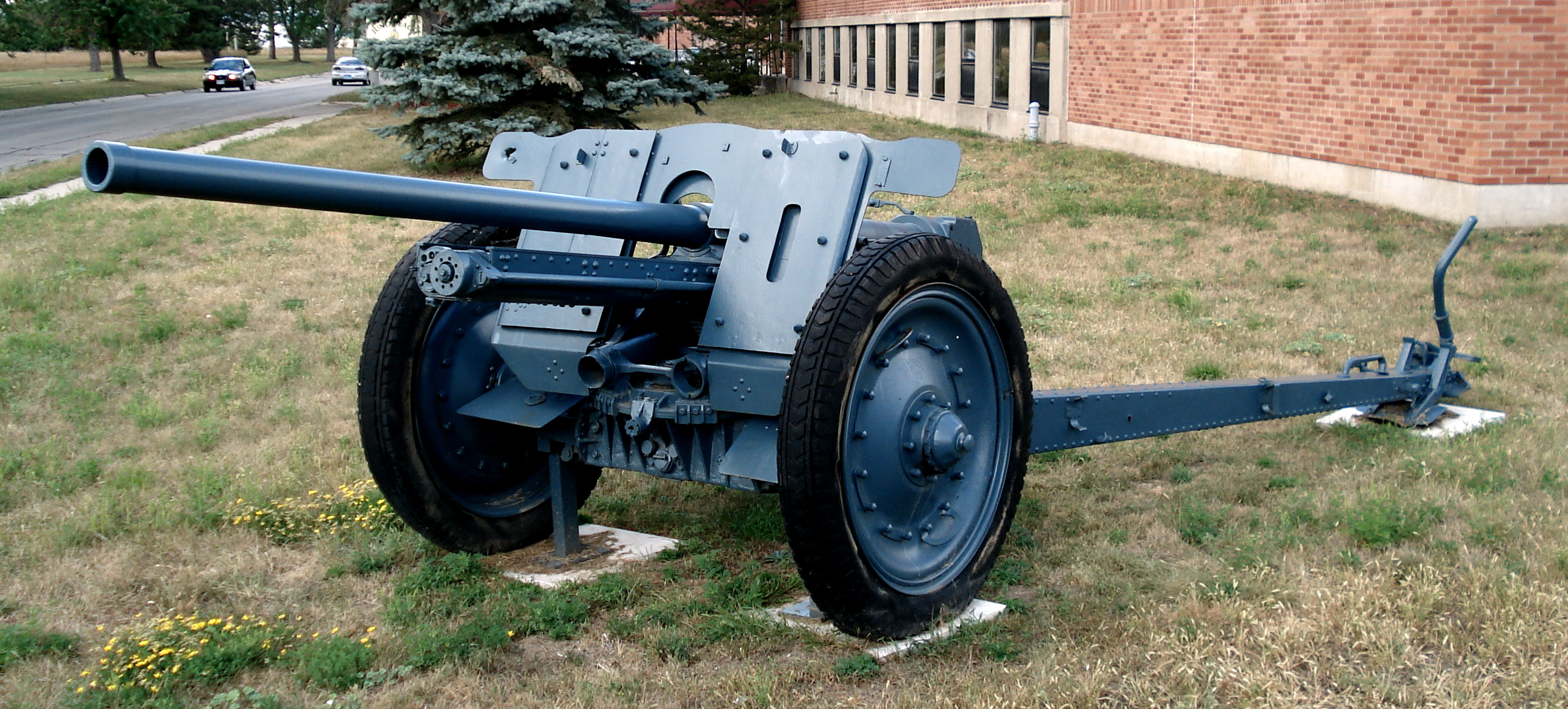
German Pak 36(r) antitank gun

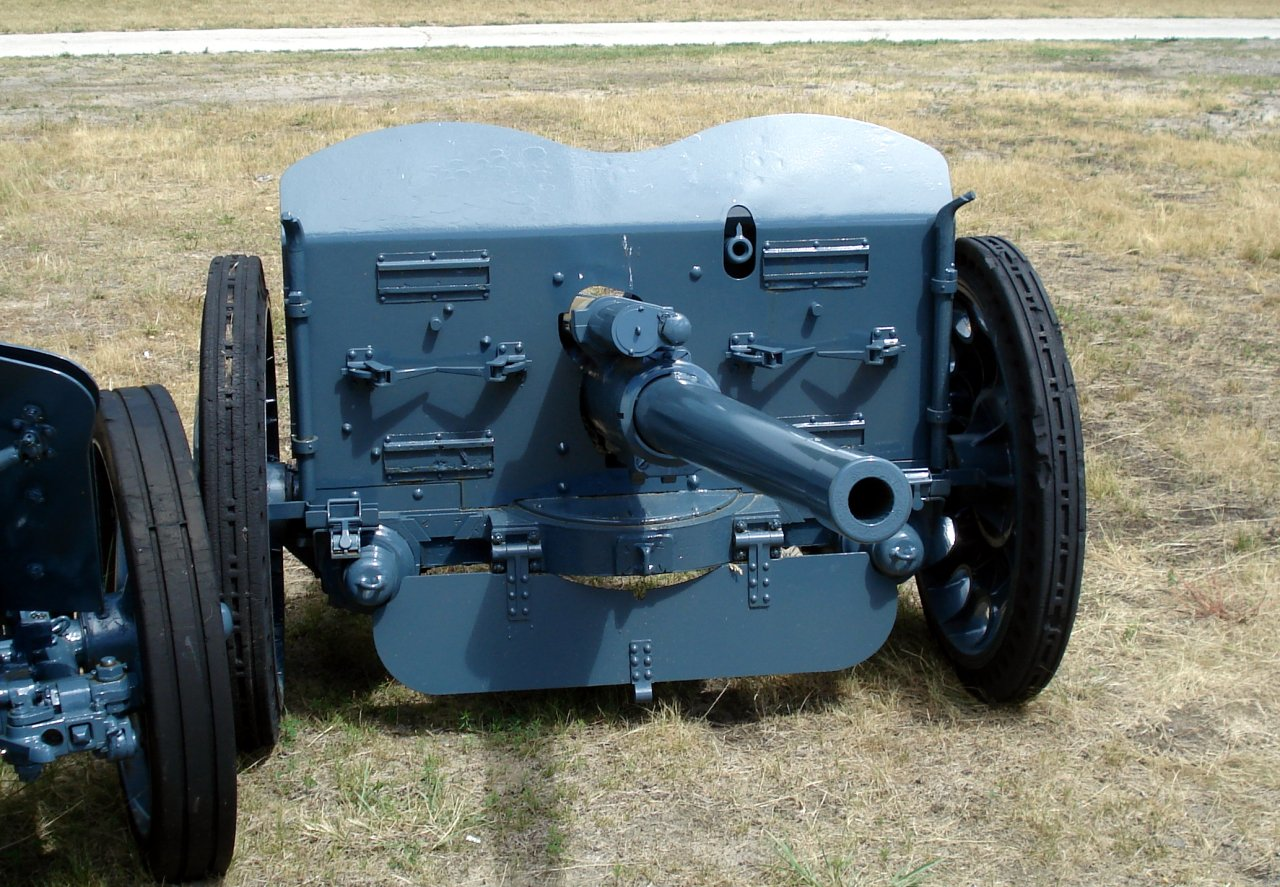
47 mm APX anti-tank gun

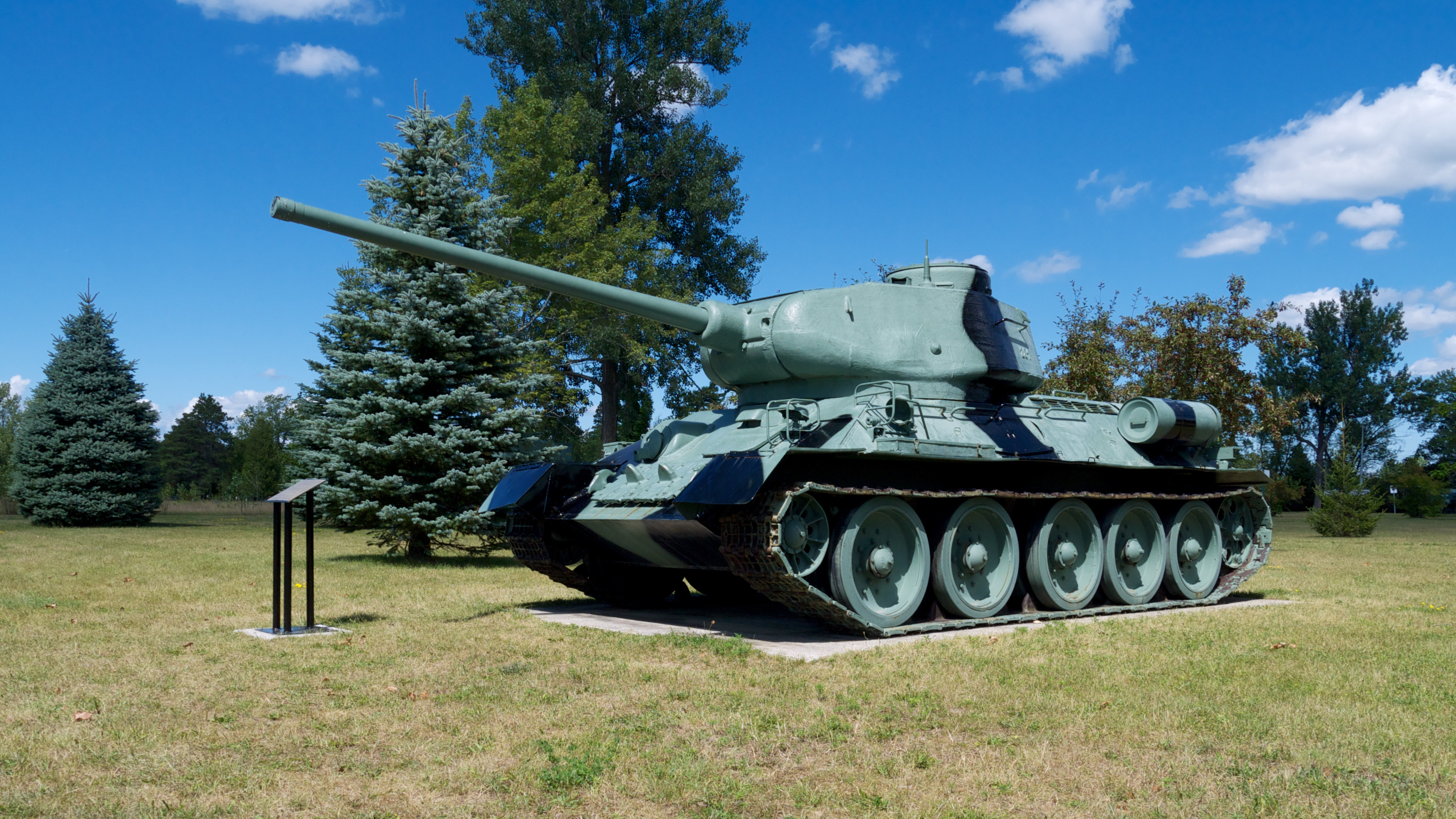
T-34-85

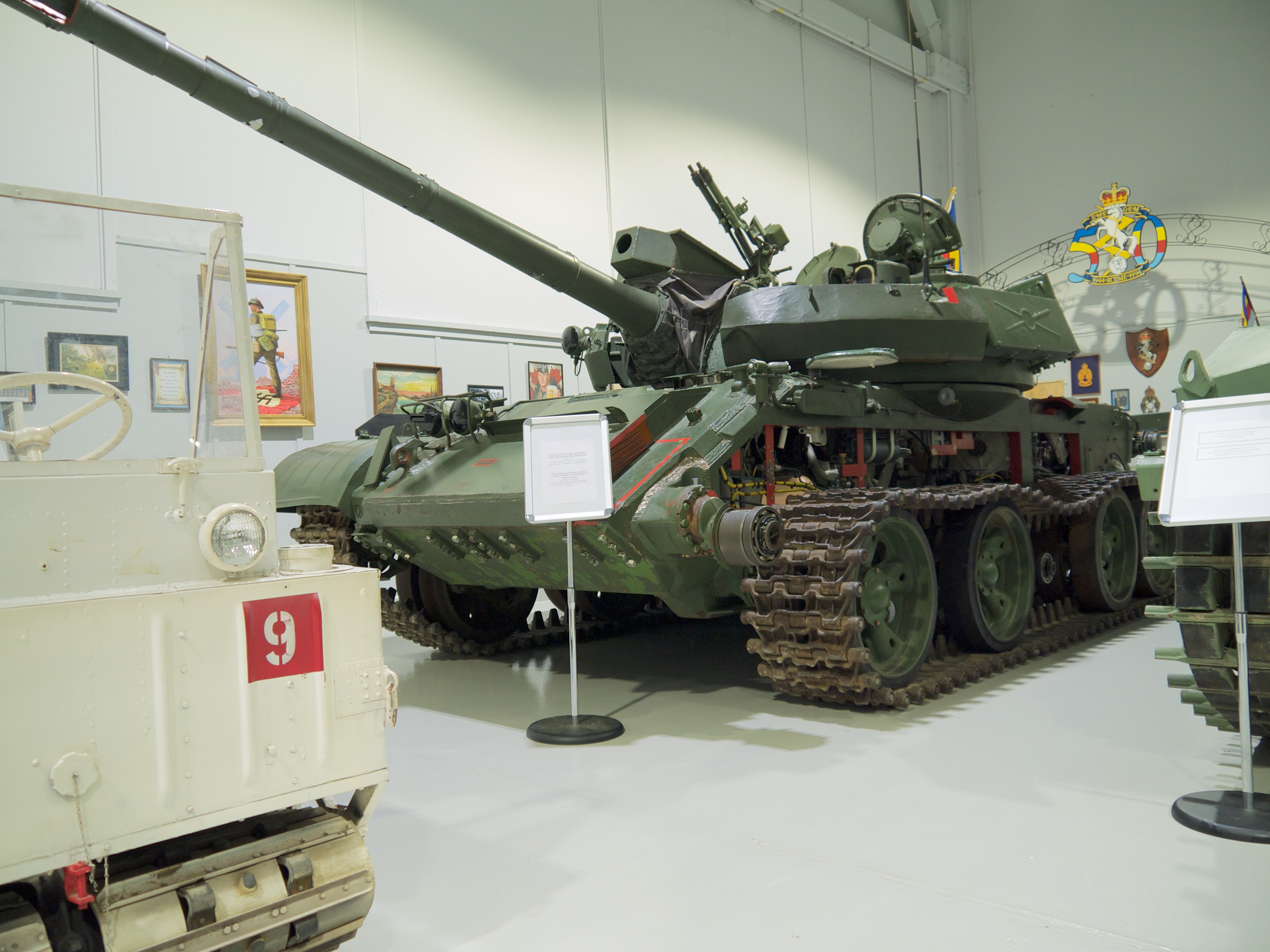
T-55

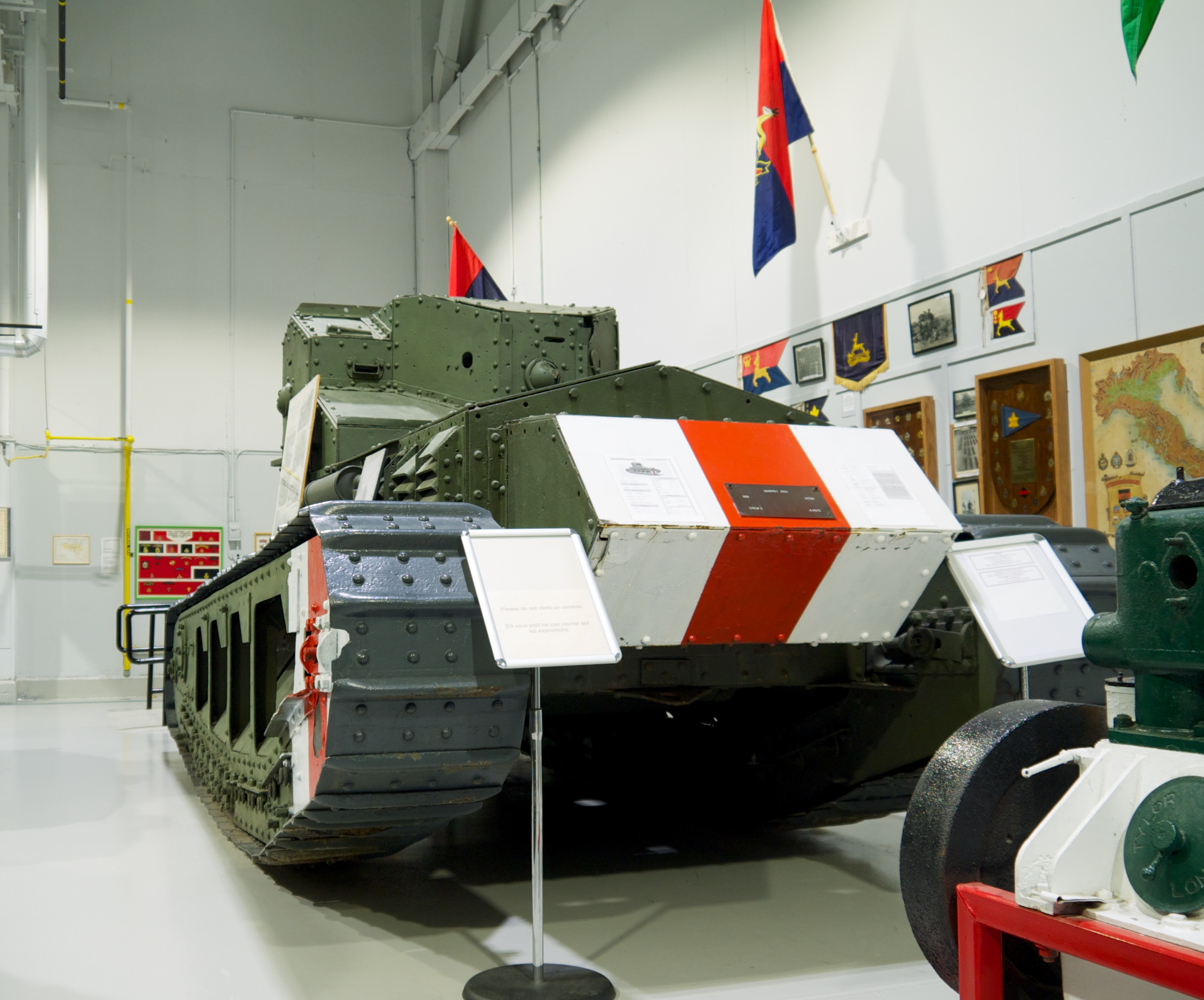
Whippet

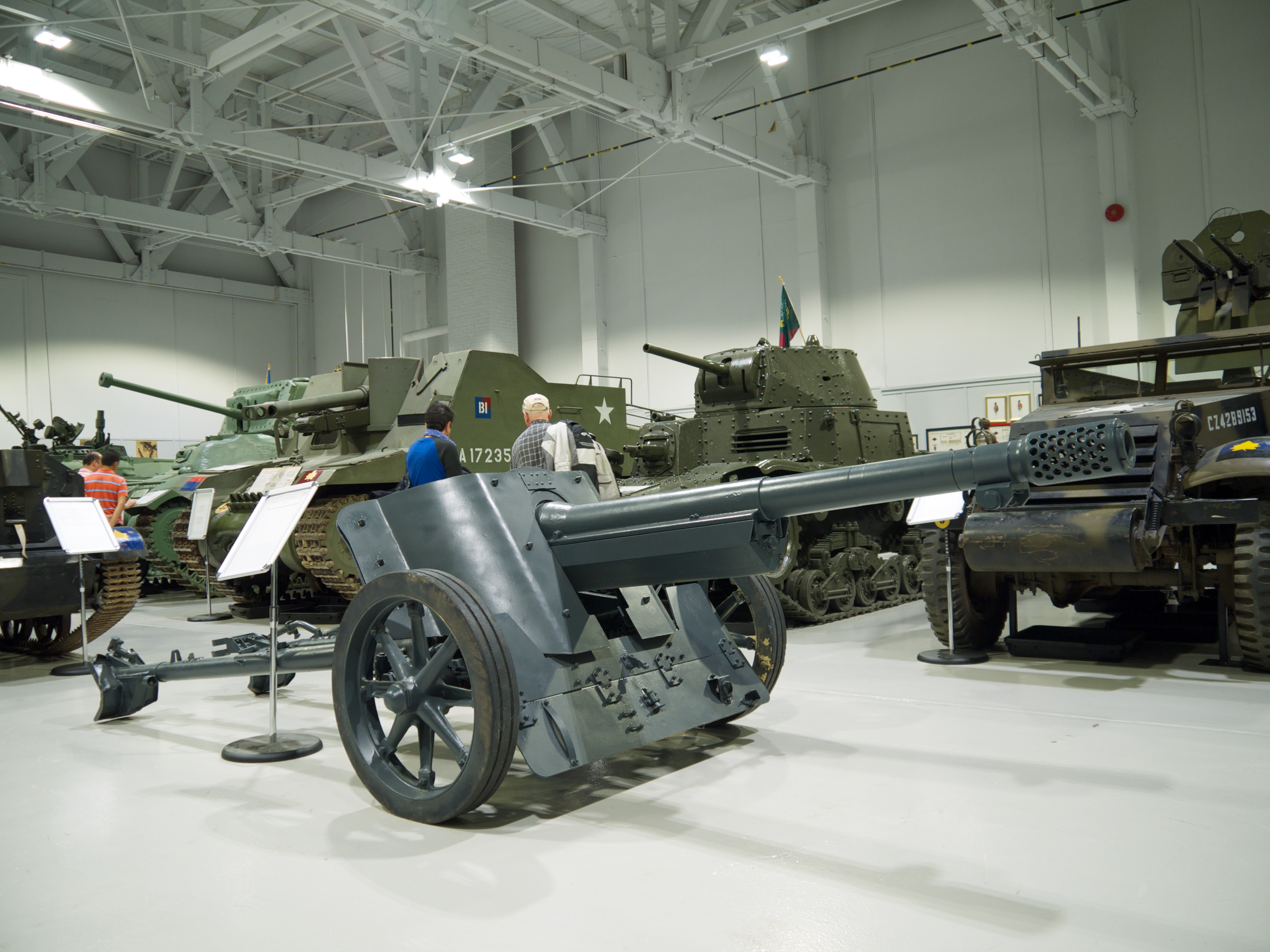
7.5 cm Pak 97/38

== See also ==
- Organization of Military Museums of Canada
- Elgin Military Museum
- Maritime Museum of the Atlantic
- National Air Force Museum of Canada
- The Military Museums
- The Queen's Own Cameron Highlanders of Canada Museum
- Virtual Museum of Canada
- Organization of Military Museums of Canada
- Military history of Canada
