= William Cameron Murphy =

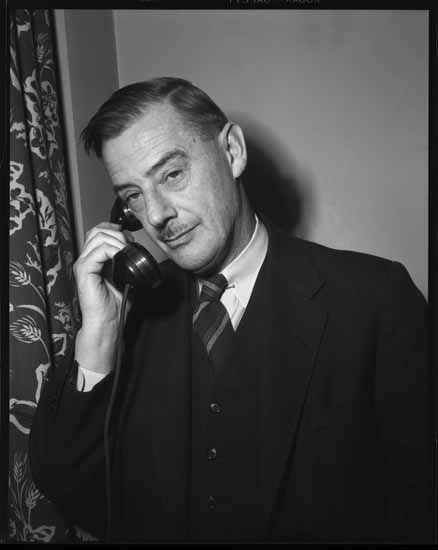

Brigadier William Cameron Murphy, CBE, DSO, ED, QC (27 April 1905 – 1961) was a Canadian lawyer and Canadian Army officer who commanded the 1st Canadian Armoured Brigade during the last stages of the Second World War.

== Biography ==
The son of Mr Justice Denis Murphy of the Supreme Court of British Columbia, Murphy was born in Ashcroft and educated at Lord Roberts Elementary School, King George Secondary School, and the University of British Columbia. He was called to the bar of British Columbia in 1929.

At the outbreak of the Second World War, Murphy was a major with the British Columbia Regiment (Duke of Connaught's Own), but reverted to the lower rank of captain in order to go overseas with the Princess Patricia's Canadian Light Infantry. He became commanding officer of the British Columbia Dragoons in 1942. From 1943 to 1944, he was appointed to the staff of the 5th Canadian Armoured Division.

In 1944, he assumed command of the 1st Canadian Armoured Brigade, which fought in Italy and participated in the liberation of the Netherlands.

Murphy was appointed to the Vancouver Police Commission in 1955. He was a director of several companies.

== Honours ==
For his services in Italy, Murphy was appointed to the Distinguished Service Order in 1944, twice mentioned in despatches in 1945, and appointed a Commander of the Order of the British Empire. He received the American Legion of Merit in 1944.

In 1945, Murphy was made a Doctor of Laws, honoris causa, by the University of British Columbia.

The Brigadier W.C. Murphy Armoury in Vernon, British Columbia is named in his honour.
