= Robert Andrew Wyman =

Canadian Army officer

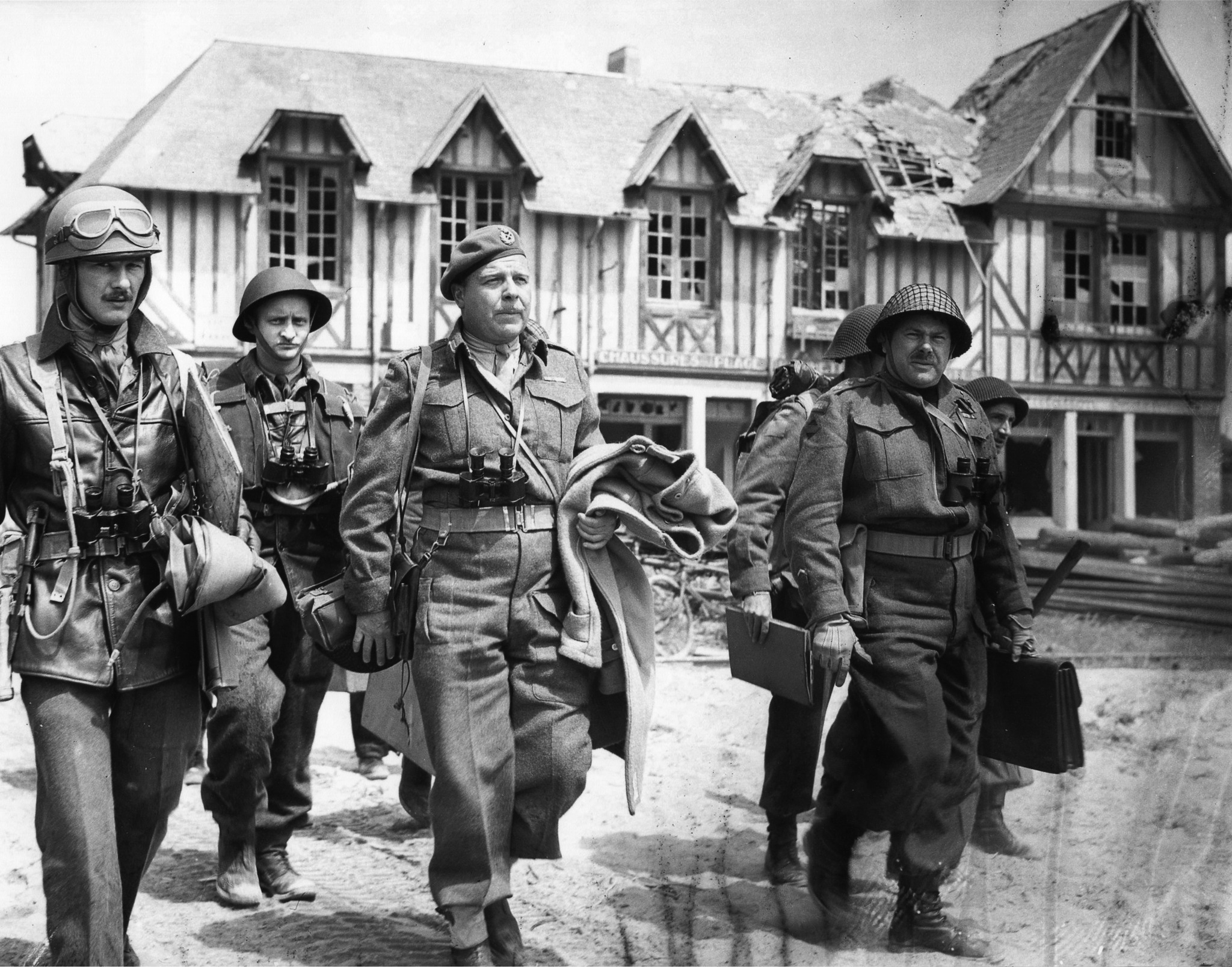
- (L-R): Capt. Charles Turton (ADC), A/Maj. Bill Seamark (GSO3-Ops), and Maj-Gen. Rod Keller (GOC) of the 3rd CID along with Brig. Bob Wyman (BC) of 2nd CAB. 6 June 1944
- Born: 23 February 1904; Philadelphia, Pennsylvania, U.S.A.
- Died: 23 March 1967 (aged 63); Vancouver, British Columbia, Canada
- Military career
- Allegiance: Canada
- Branch: Canadian Army
- Service years: 1921-1945
- Rank: Brigadier
- Unit: Canadian Armoured Corps

Brigadier Robert "Bob" Andrew Wyman, CBE, DSO, ED (23 February 1904 – 23 March 1967) was a Canadian Army senior field officer who commanded Canadian Armoured Corps (CAC) formations on the front lines of the Second World War. He commanded the 1st Canadian Armoured Brigade on the Italian Front from 10 July 1943 to 26 February 1944, having served as its commander since 2 February 1942. Wyman was later appointed as commander of the 2nd Canadian Armoured Brigade on 15 April 1944, leading the formation during the Normandy Campaign on the Western Front from 6 June to 8 August 1944. On 8 August, at the start of Operation Totalize, Wyman was wounded in action, effectively ending his wartime service. He did not return to an active field command for the rest of the conflict's duration.
