= Pacific Command (Canadian Army) =

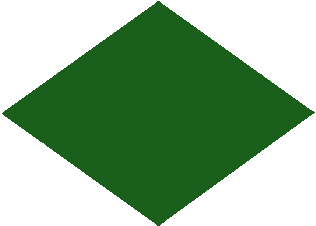
- Formation patch of Pacific Command.
- Active: During the Second World War, 1940–1946
- Country: Canada
- Branch: Canadian Army
- Garrison/HQ: Headquarters: Vancouver, BC
- Engagements: Second World War: Aleutian Islands campaign; Operation Cottage

Commanders
- Notable commanders: Maj.-Gen. George Pearkes, VC

Pacific Command was a formation of the Canadian Army created during the Second World War to strengthen and administer home defence facilities on Canada's Pacific Coast against possible Japanese attack. A second major function was to train reinforcements to be sent to the Canadian divisions in Europe. Pacific Command combined the pre-war Military District No. 11 (British Columbia and the Yukon Territory) with Military District No. 13 (Alberta and the District of Mackenzie of the Northwest Territories). The command headquarters was initially housed in Esquimalt Fortress near Victoria, but on 30 November 1942 it was moved to the Old Hotel Vancouver in downtown Vancouver.

== History ==
After the United States entered the war in December 1941, Canada and the U.S. coordinated their defence of the west coast of North America. Thus Pacific Command operated in close cooperation with Western Defense Command to the south and with Alaska Defense Command to the north.

The troops of Pacific Command were concentrated in the three strategic coastal centres:

- Victoria-Esquimalt, the capital of British Columbia and the location of Canada's Pacific naval base and headquarters
- Vancouver, the largest city in British Columbia, Canada's largest port on the Pacific, and the Pacific terminus of the Canadian Pacific Railway
- Prince Rupert, the second Pacific terminus of the Canadian National Railway (in addition to Vancouver)

By the middle of the war a significant proportion of the troops of Pacific Command were conscripts under the National Resources Mobilization Act (NRMA) adopted in June 1940. This act precluded the use of conscripts in overseas operations. However, a plebiscite held in April 1942 released the Canadian government from this restriction (see the Conscription Crisis of 1944). Even after the plebiscite, the government was reluctant to send conscripts into combat outside of North America. The Terrace Mutiny occurred in November 1944 among troops of Pacific Command when it was learned that the government of Prime Minister William Lyon Mackenzie King had decided to start sending conscripts to Europe to reinforce depleted combat units.

In August 1943 troops of Pacific Command participated in Operation Cottage, in the final stages of the Aleutian Islands campaign. However, that campaign ended without a shot being fired at the enemy when it was discovered that the Japanese occupiers of Kiska had already evacuated the island. The only "enemy" the Pacific Command troops inflicted upon physically were American forces, after a Canadian soldier mistakenly shot at American lines, causing a sporadic friendly fire incident between the two forces that left 28 Americans and four Canadians dead, with 50 others injured.

Apart from one incident when Japanese submarine I-26 shelled the lighthouse at Estevan Point on 20 June 1942, and the arrival of ineffectual fire balloons launched from Japan between November 1944 and April 1945, the feared military threat from Japan never materialized. The two home defence infantry divisions attached to Pacific Command were thus broken up and their personnel were redistributed to other formations.

General Order Number 21/1946, dated 28 January 1946, effective 23 January 1946 authorized five commands, among which was the new Western Command, which appears to have absorbed the area of the former Pacific Command.

== Composition ==
- Victoria and Esquimalt Fortress
  - 31st (Alberta) Reconnaissance Regiment, CAC
  - 5th (B.C.) Coast Regiment, RCA
  - 27th Anti-Aircraft Regiment, RCA
  - 21st Field Regiment, RCA
  - 3rd Battalion, The Regina Rifle Regiment
  - 1st Battalion, Le Régiment de Hull
- Vancouver Defences
  - 15th (Vancouver) Coast Regiment, RCA
  - 28th Anti-Aircraft Regiment, RCA
  - 1st Battalion, The Royal Rifles of Canada
  - 1st Battalion, The Canadian Fusiliers (City of London Regiment)
- Prince Rupert Defences
  - 17th (North British Columbia) Coast Regiment, RCA
  - 29th Anti-Aircraft Regiment, RCA
  - 34th Anti-Aircraft Regiment, RCA (at Annette Island, Alaska)
  - One battery of the 22nd Field Regiment, RCA
  - 1st Battalion, The Midland Regiment (Northumberland and Durham)
  - 1st Battalion, The Winnipeg Grenadiers
  - Two companies of 1st Battalion, King's Own Rifles of Canada
- 30th Anti-Aircraft Regiment, RCA (Vancouver Island)
- Pacific Coast Militia Rangers
- Pacific Command Water Transport Company, R.C.A.S.C.
- 19th Infantry Brigade, Command Reserve (Vernon)
- 6th Canadian Infantry Division (Vancouver Island), Mar. 1942 - Dec. 1944
  - Divisional troops based in Esquimalt
  - 13th Infantry Brigade (Port Alberni)
  - 18th Infantry Brigade (Nanaimo)
- 8th Canadian Infantry Division (Northern British Columbia), Mar. 1942 - Oct. 1943
  - Divisional troops based in Prince George
  - 14th Infantry Brigade (Terrace)
  - 16th Infantry Brigade (Prince George)

== Commanders ==
The following three generals served as General Officers Commander-in-Chief (GOC-in-C) Pacific Command:

- Major-General Ronald Alexander, 30 October 1940 – 30 June 1942
- Major-General George Pearkes, 2 September 1942 – 15 February 1945
- Major-General Franklin Worthington, 1 April 1945 – 26 January 1946

== See also ==
- Atlantic Command (Canadian Army), the corresponding command on the Atlantic Coast
- Fort Rodd Hill National Historic Site, important coastal defence installation protecting the naval port at Esquimalt
