= Royal Canadian Army Service Corps =

Administrative and transport unit of the Canadian Army from 1901 to 1968

- Badge of the corps
- Active: 1 November 1901–1 February 1968
- Country: Canada
- Branch: Canadian Army
- Type: Administrative corps
- Role: Military logistics, military supply-chain management, military administration
- Motto: Nil sine labore (Latin for 'nothing without work')
- March: "Wait for the Wagon"

The Royal Canadian Army Service Corps (RCASC) was an administrative and transport corps of the Canadian Army. The Canadian Army Service Corps was established in the Non-Permanent Active Militia in 1901 and in the Permanent Active Militia in 1903. The Canadian Permanent Army Service Corps was redesignated The Royal Canadian Army Service Corps on 3 Nov 1919.

== History ==
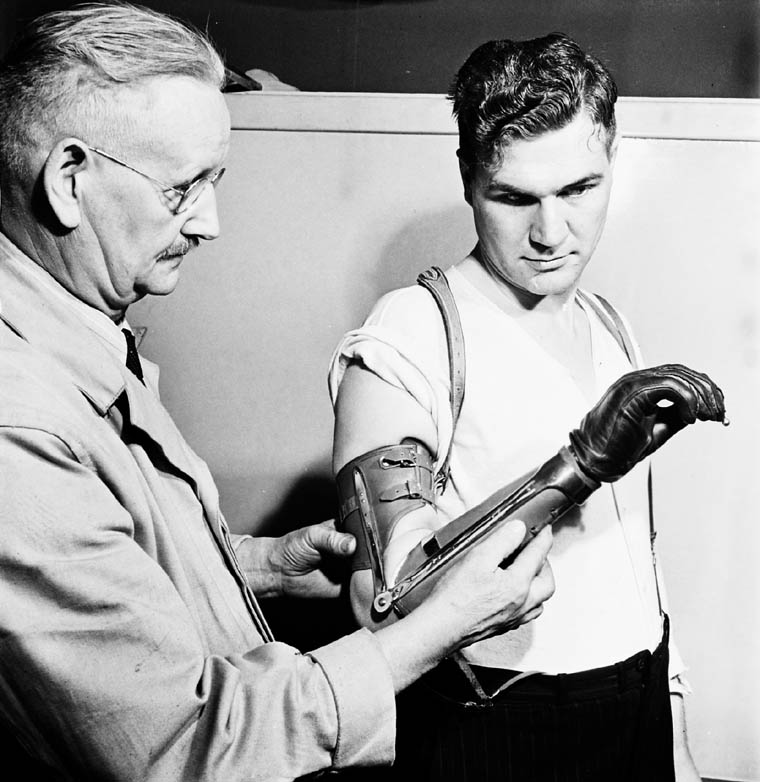
Private Ed Gerris of the RCASC, seen here with Principal Eccles of Shaw Business Schools, is using an artificial hand

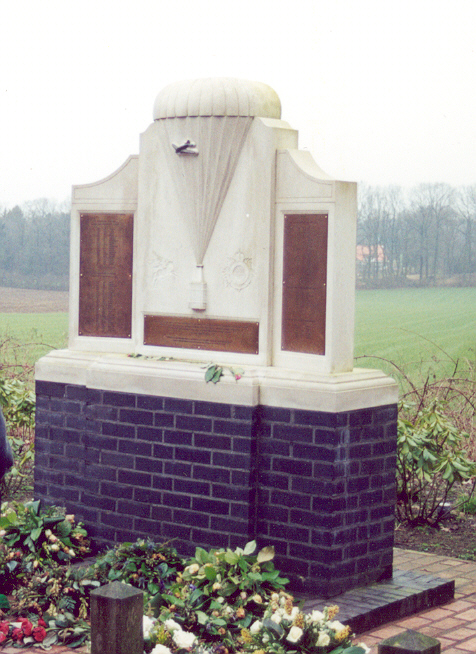
Arnhem monument honours air despatchers of the RCASC who worked with aircrew of the Royal Air Force and the Royal Canadian Air Force

The RCASC was established by General Order No. 141, as the Canadian Army Service Corps (CASC), on November 1, 1901. The CASC was modelled directly off the British Army Service Corps to provide all transportation and supply services to the Army. Initially, the CASC consisted of four companies to support the Active Militia units (No. 1 at London, No. 2 at Toronto, No. 3 at Kingston and No. 4 at Montreal).

The Permanent Component of the CASC was created under General Order 21 of December 1903 and the corps grew quickly, doubling the number of units by 1903, and growing by another three companies by 1905. By the summer of 1914 the CASC had a strength of 3000 personnel in eighteen companies.

At the same time the Non-permanent CASC was increased with additional companies being formed at No. 5 at Ottawa, No. 6 at Sherbrooke, No. 7 at Saint John NB, and No. 8 at Kentville NS. No. 1 Company located at London was relocated to Ottawa and in 1903 to Guelph. In August 1905 further nonpermanent companies were added at No. 9 at Hamilton, No. 10 at Quebec City, and No. 11 at Winnipeg. In February 1907 a second Toronto company, No. 12 was formed and in April 1910 No. 14 at Calgary, No. 15 at Montreal, No. 16 at London, No. 17 at Raymond, Quebec, No. 18 at Winnipeg and No. 19 at Vancouver (there was no No. 13.). In August 1914 a further three non-permanent C.A.S.C. Companies were authorized No. 20 at Regina, No. 21 at Victoria and No. 22 at Edmonton.

During World War I, the CASC provided a support element for each Canadian Division, and later on, for the Canadian Corps. With the introduction of motorized vehicles, the CASC carried commodities of a greater range and of greater weights. Motorized transportation also resulted in expanded responsibilities such as driving ambulances and engineer pontoon vehicles, carrying all natures of ammunition, and mobile repair and recovery. In recognition of the services rendered during the Great War, His Majesty King George V authorized the designator “Royal” in 1919.

The RCASC, along with the rest of the Army, underwent a rapid expansion as Canada mobilized for the Second World War. In addition to maintaining transport for the army on land, the RCASC also commanded and maintained a ship-borne freight and patrol company, the Pacific Command Water Transport Company, during World War II. The RCASC provided support to Canadian Soldiers wherever they went; training in Canada and Great Britain, the campaign in north-west Europe, (see: British logistics in the Normandy Campaign ), and in the campaign in Italy. The RCASC moved supplies from the rear areas to the front-lines. They delivered all rations, ammunition, petroleum products, and all other essentials. They did so with a variety of vehicles ranging from three- to ten-ton trucks, and forty-ton tank transporters.

During the 1950s, the RCASC committed No. 1 and No. 2 Movement Control Groups, 54 Canadian Transport Company, 28 Motorized Ambulance Company, and 58 General Transport Company to the Korean War. In 1952, 23 Transport Company relieved 54 Transport Company, which was in turn relieved by 56 Transport Company. 3 Transport Company was the last to serve in Korea in 1954. 4 Transport Company (previously known as 56 Transport Company and then 5 Transport Company) moved from Winnipeg to Calgary in August 1967. In June 1968, 4 Transport Company combined with elements of the static 13 Transport Company. Three months later that organization became the Transport Company of 1st Service Battalion.

== Unification ==
When the Army, Royal Canadian Navy, and Royal Canadian Air Force were merged in 1968 to form the Canadian Forces, the administrative Corps of the Army were deactivated and merged with their Naval and Air Force counterparts to form the Canadian Forces' personnel branches.

- The RCASC's transport and supply elements were combined with the Royal Canadian Ordnance Corps to form the Logistics Branch
- The RCASC's clerical trades were merged with the Royal Canadian Army Pay Corps and the Royal Canadian Postal Corps to form the Administration Branch (later merged with the Logistics Branch)
- Until the formation of the Service Battalions in September 1968, all transportation service was provided by the Royal Canadian Army Service Corps.

== RCASC units overseas 1945 ==
1st Armoured Brigade

- 1st Armoured Brigade Company

2nd Armoured Brigade

- 2nd Armoured Brigade Company

1st Infantry Division

- 1st Infantry Divisional Troops Company
- 1st Infantry Brigade Company
- 2nd Infantry Brigade Company
- 3rd Infantry Brigade Company

2nd Infantry Division

- 2nd Infantry Divisional Troops Company
- 4th Infantry Brigade Company
- 5th Infantry Brigade Company
- 6th Infantry Brigade Company

3rd Infantry Division

- 3rd Infantry Divisional Troops Company
- 7th Infantry Brigade Company
- 8th Infantry Brigade Company
- 9th Infantry Brigade Company

4th Armoured Division

- 4th Armoured Divisional Troops Company
- 4th Armoured Divisional Transport Company
- 4th Armoured Brigade Company
- 10th Infantry Brigade Company

5th Armoured Division

- 5th Armoured Divisional Troops Company
- 5th Armoured Divisional Transport Company
- 5th Armoured Brigade Company
- 11th Infantry Brigade Company

1st Corps Troops

- 1st Headquarters Corps Car Company
- 1st Corps Transport Company
- No. 31 Corps Troops Company
- No. 32 Corps Troops Company

2nd Corps Troops

- No. 2 Headquarters Corps Car Company
- 2nd Corps Transport Company
- No. 33 Corps Troops Company
- No. 34 Corps Troops Company

First Canadian Army Troops

- No. 1 Army Headquarters Car Company
- No. 35 Army Troops Composite Company
- No. 36 Army Troops Composite Company
- No. 81 Artillery Company
- No. 82 Artillery Company
- No. 41 Army Transport Company
- No. 45 Army Transport Company
- No. 47 Army Transport Company
- No. 63 Army Transport Company
- No. 64 Army Transport Company
- No. 1 Motor Ambulance Convoy
- No. 2 Motor Ambulance Convoy

General Headquarters, Line of Communication and Base Troops

- No. 66 General Transport Company
- No. 69 General Transport Company
- No. 1 Base Transport Company
- No. 65 Tank Transporter Company
- No. 85 Bridge Company
- No. 86 Bridge Company

== RCASC units in Korea and Japan 1950–1955 ==
Korea

- No. 54 Canadian Transport Company (4 May 1951 – 11 April 1952):
- No. 23 Transport Company (10 April 1952 – 27 March 1953):
- No. 56 Transport Company (22 March 1953 – 15 April 1954):
- No. 3 Transport Company (26 March 1954 – 27 November 1954):

Japan

- No. 57 General Transport Company (1 December 52 – 26 February 1953) redesignated No. 58 General Transport Company 27 February 1953 – 4 January 1955
- No. 2 Canadian Movement Control Group (7 October 50 – 4 January 55)

== Bands ==
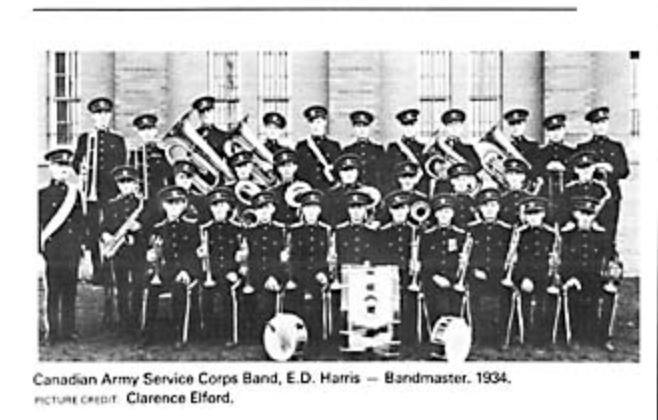
An RCASC Band in Calgary, 1934

The RCASC sported multiple military bands during its 67-year history. The full dress uniform at the time was the army's dress blues accompanied by a white pith helmet. The original band wore a khaki uniform, however, the commanding officer arranged for a dress blue uniform.

The following is a list featuring the organization of RCASC bands in the past:

- Royal Canadian Army Service Corps Brass and Reed Band
- Royal Canadian Army Service Corps Bugle Band
- Royal Canadian Army Service Corps Apprentice School Bugle Band
- Band of the 5th Column, Royal Canadian Army Service Corps (Toronto)
- No. 49 "Tipper" Company (High River)
- 153 Company, 7 Column, RCASC (High River)

The Calgary units of the RCASC formed a band in 1932, with its first public performance was being on 12 March 1933 at Strand theatre. Many band members went overseas in 1940 and a new trumpet and drum band was formed at Sarcee Barracks to replace this band. The latter was dissolved at the end of the war and a new RCASC band was organized by George Bealing in 1948. By the end the summer of 1942, the band mainly consisted of musicians from the depleted ranks of the West Canadian Collieries Band. This band officially disbanded in 1963, with most remaining members transferring to The King's Own Calgary Regiment Band. On 2 September 1939, the RCASC Trumpet Band marched through the streets of Ottawa with accompanying placards that were designed to recruit Canadian volunteers following the declaration of war on Nazi Germany.

The 5th Column RCASC Trumpet Band from Toronto was the RCASC predecessor to the then Jolly Jesters and the modern-day Burlington Commanders Drum Corps. At the time of its active service, it was part of the army reserve. In 1955, the army forbade the band from performing at a civilian function in Toronto. As a result, the band made the decision to remove itself from the army order of battle and become a civilian group.

Notable RCASC bandsmen included the following officers and personnel:

- Peter John Powers, founder of a local unit band and former National President of the Federation of Musicians for Canada.
- J. Alan Wood
- Alexander D. Knight Jr, former member of the RCASC trumpet band and former Vice President/business manager of the Toronto Signals Band.
- George Edward Jardine, Canadian authors
- Ted Reilly, Drum Major of the RCASC Toronto Band and founder of the Jolly Jesters.

== Armoury ==
| Site | Date(s) | Designated | Description | Image |
|---|---|---|---|---|
| Colonel D. V. Currie VC Armoury, 1215 Main Street North, Moose Jaw, Saskatchewan | 1913-14 | 1998 Register of the Government of Canada Heritage Buildings | large, low-massed brick structure located in the north end of Moose Jaw in a mixed commercial, recreational and residential neighbourhood.; Currently the home of the Saskatchewan Dragoons; it has housed 95th Saskatchewan Rifles, the 60th Rifles, the King's Own Rifles of Canada, the 77th Battery, Royal Canadian Artillery, the 19th Medical Company, Royal Canadian Army Medical Corps, and the 142nd Transport Company, Royal Canadian Army Service Corps | |

== See also ==
- List of armouries in Canada
- Military history of Canada
- History of the Canadian Army
- Canadian Forces
