= Ontario Regiment Museum =

Coordinates: 43°55′02″N 78°53′37″W

The Ontario Regiment RCAC Museum
- Established: 1980
- Location: South Field of the Oshawa Municipal Airport, 1000 Stevenson Rd N, Oshawa, Ontario, Canada
- Type: Canadian Forces Museum
- Website: www.ontrmuseum.ca

The Ontario Regiment (RCAC) Museum is a military museum located in Oshawa, Ontario, Canada. The museum is located on the South Field of the Oshawa Municipal Airport, 1000 Stevenson Rd N, Oshawa, Ontario (50 km east of Toronto, Ontario).

The museum is composed of a static section tracing the history of the Ontario Regiment, and a "Vehicle Section" with more than 130 operational military vehicles, including jeeps, trucks and tanks, making it the largest collection in North America.

== Mission ==
The museum restores, preserves, displays, and commemorates the service of the Canadian Armed Forces (with an emphasis on the Royal Canadian Armoured Corps and its vehicles) and its role in the history of Canada. It does this through using artifacts to tell the story of the Ontario Regiment from 1850 to the present day and its collection of historical military vehicles to "bring history to life." The museum seeks to honour those who came before and those who are currently serving and to make the history accessible to the public in an engaging, relevant, and exciting way.

== Volunteers and supporters ==
The museum is a non-profit organization with two full-time staff and more than 200 volunteer members. These members act as guides, drivers, and maintainers of the vehicle collection, as well as the first line of restorers to bring historic vehicles back to life.

The museum is a proud member of the Durham Region Community and is often supported by members of the Ontario Regiment, the Ontario Regiment Cadet Corps, Royal Canadian Legion Branches 43 and 637, and 420 Wing (Oshawa)–Royal Canadian Air force Association.

The museum is also supported by the Royal Canadian Armoured Corp Association (Cavalry), the Royal Canadian Armoured Corps, and the Canadian Forces Directorate of History and Heritage.

== The Museum ==
=== The grounds and buildings ===
The museum is housed on the South Field of the Historic Oshawa Executive Airport. The airport opened in June 1941 under the British Commonwealth Air Training Plan as No. 20 Elementary Flying Training School RCAF Station Oshawa. Only three of the original buildings are still standing. Potential military pilots from Commonwealth and Occupied countries were trained in this field. There is one primary museum building composed of the Static or Museum Section, three workshops (not open to the public), a vehicle bay, and the Military Vehicle Conservation Centre. The Museum has the use of two other building but these are not open to the public.

=== The Museum Section ===
The Museum Section documents the story of the Ontario Regiment RCAC from its beginnings in 1866 as the 34th Ontario Battalion of Infantry, through WW1 as the 34th and 116th Battalions, 11th Armoured Regiment (The Ontario Regiment (Tank)) in WW2 and the Ontario Regiment (RCAC) today. Members of this regiment have served Canada in every military operation since the Fenian Raids.

The museum recounts the history through the display of artefacts grouped by type and period - Pre-Confederation, South African War, WW1, WW2, Afghanistan. These artefacts include uniforms, personal items, weapons (deactivated), medals, pictures, and trophies. The Museum Section can be enjoyed by the visitor alone, but the use of a guide is recommended to get some of the backstories behind the artefacts.

=== The Military Vehicle Conservation Centre ===
The Military Vehicle Conservation Centre was added on in 2018 and provided an additional 15,300 square feet for the vehicle collection. While in this section of the museum, visitors will experience the largest operational, historical military vehicle fleet in North America and teams of volunteers maintaining and restoring them.

=== The vehicle collection ===
The vehicle collection started in 1976 when the then Honorary Colonel of the Ontario Regiment, Norman Wilton, purchased nine Ferret Scout Cars for use as a ceremonial troop. The original nine cars soon grew with the addition of BART - M4A2(76) W HVSS. Bart was acquired after WW2 from the US and was used as a training vehicle by the Ontario Regiment until the mid-1970s. Since then, the vehicle collection has continued to grow. The current inventory includes, but is not limited to, the following vehicles:

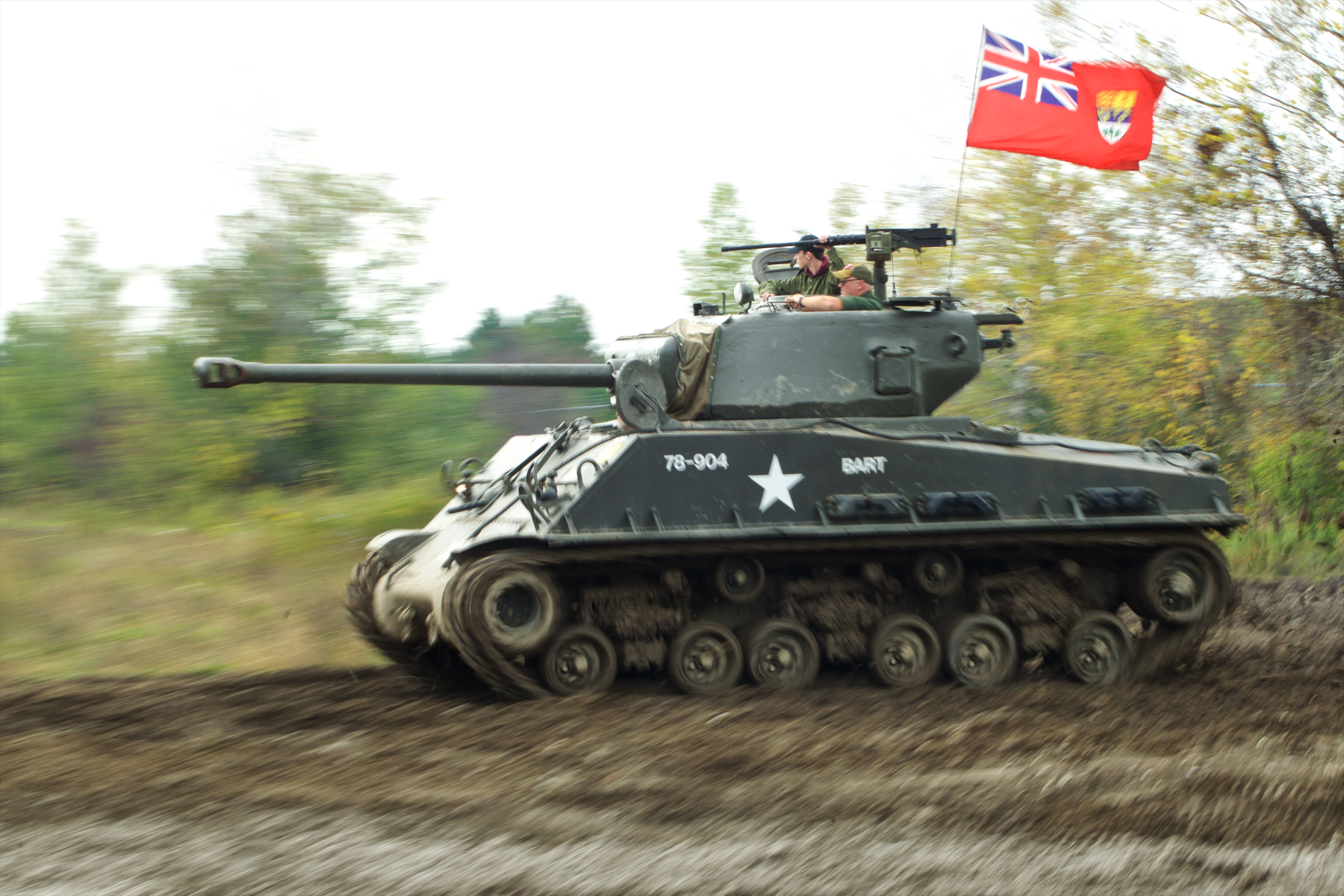
Bart on the move at the Ontario Regiment Museum

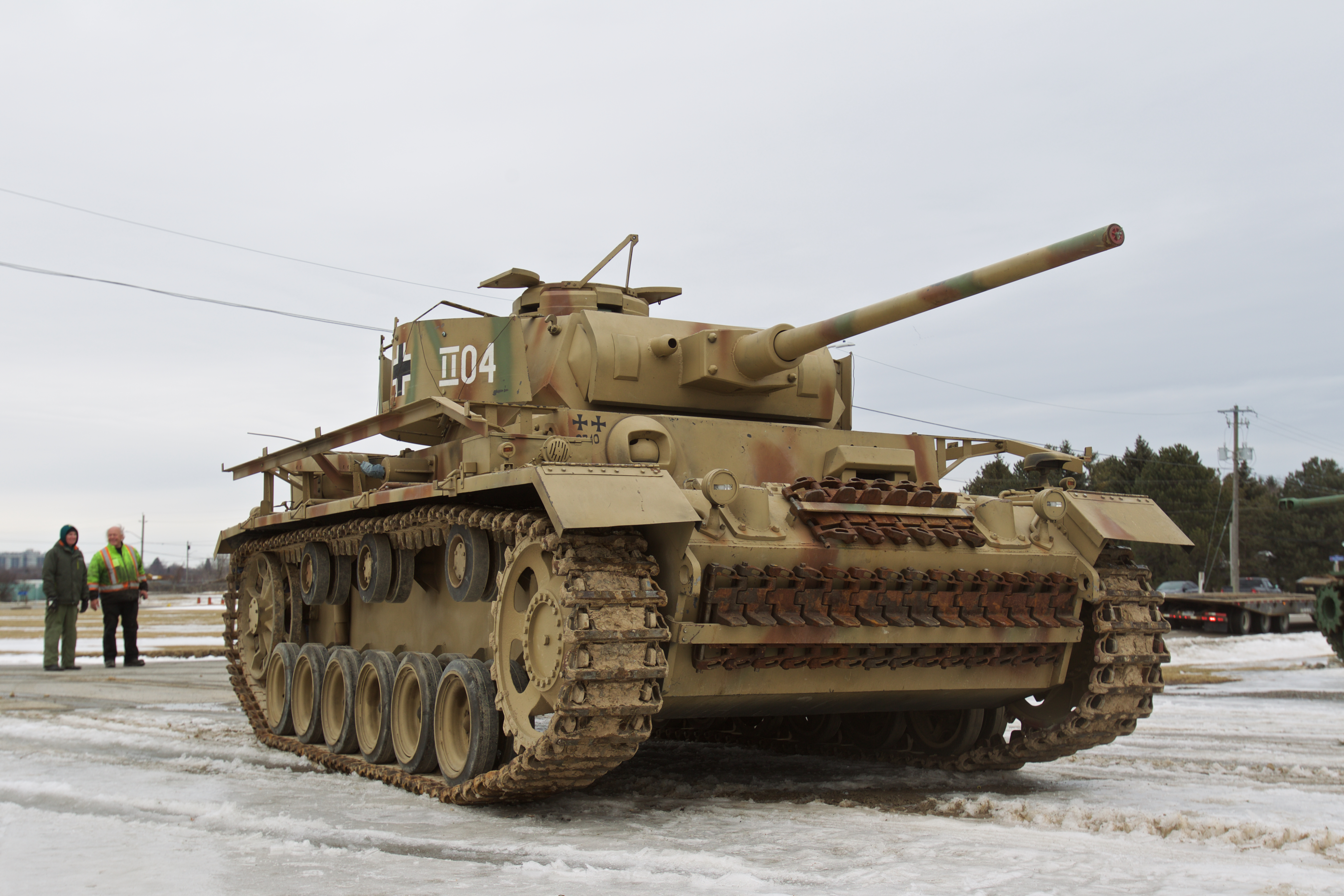
Panzer III J at the Ontario Regiment Museum

==== World War Two ====
- M4A2(76) W HVSS - BART and BILLY
- M3A1 Stuart
- M24 Chaffee - one of 24 acquired from the US after WW2
- M8 Greyhound
- Several CMP Trucks including a Radio Van with serial number 1 built in Oshawa
- Universal Carrier
- Fox armoured car - built at the GM plant in Oshawa
- Daimler Dingo armoured car
- Panzer III - Our Panzer II is a reproduction using authentic German Parts and/or parts cast from original
- Hetzer - The Museum's Hetzer is a G-13 retrofitted to German Army Specifications
- Sd.Kfz. 251 - There is a C and D variant. These are Czech OT-810s retrofitted to German Army Specification.
- T-34/85 - Iconic Soviet Tank of WW2. This vehicle fought in Eastern Europe as a 75 mm variant, and the Soviet invasion of Manchuria in its current 85 mm configuration.
- FLAK 88 - One of three in Canada, undergoing Restoration
- Willys MB - The Museum has several Jeeps including one used by the Ontario Regiment in Sicily and

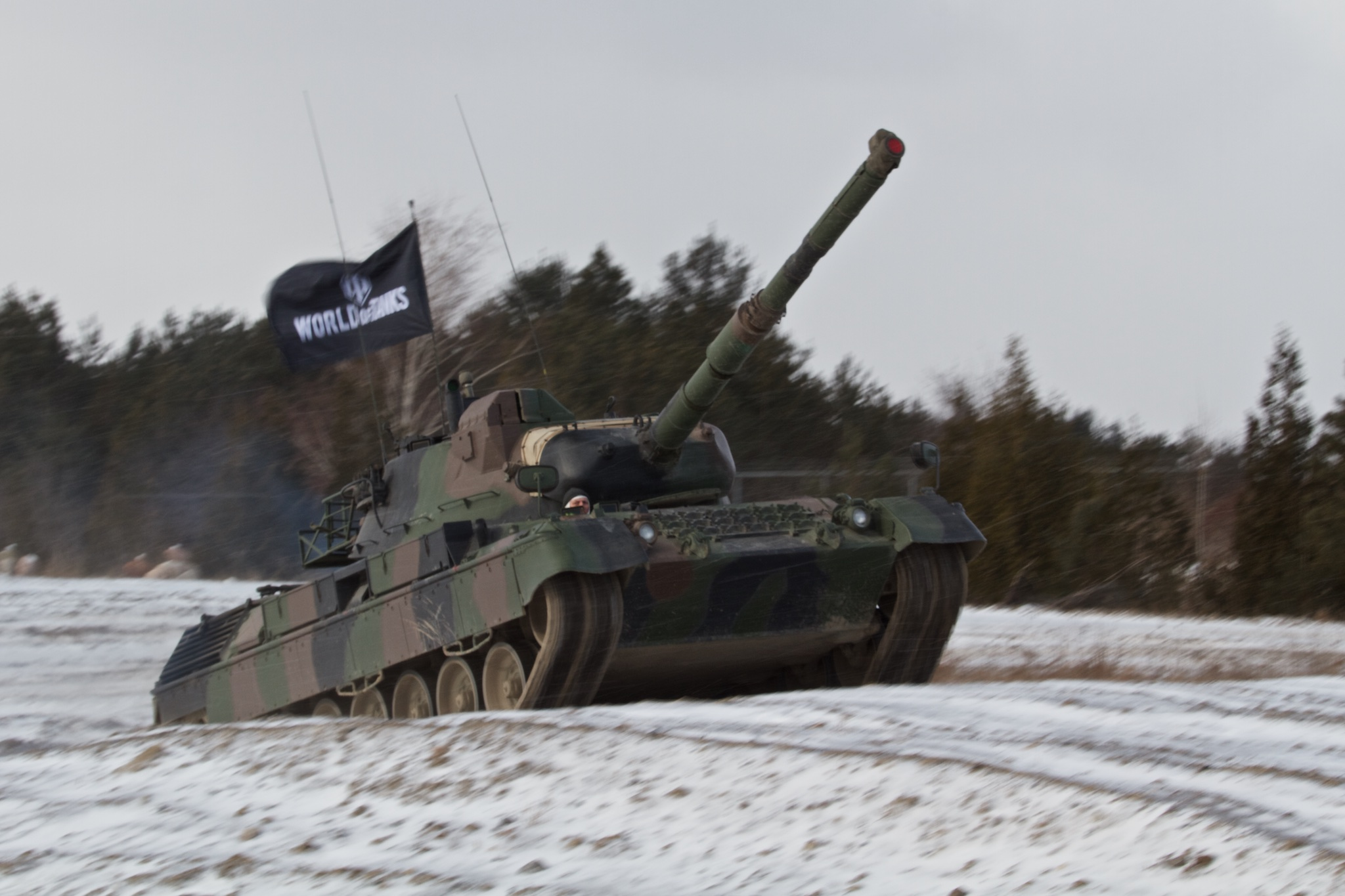
Leopard in the snow at the Ontario Regiment Museum

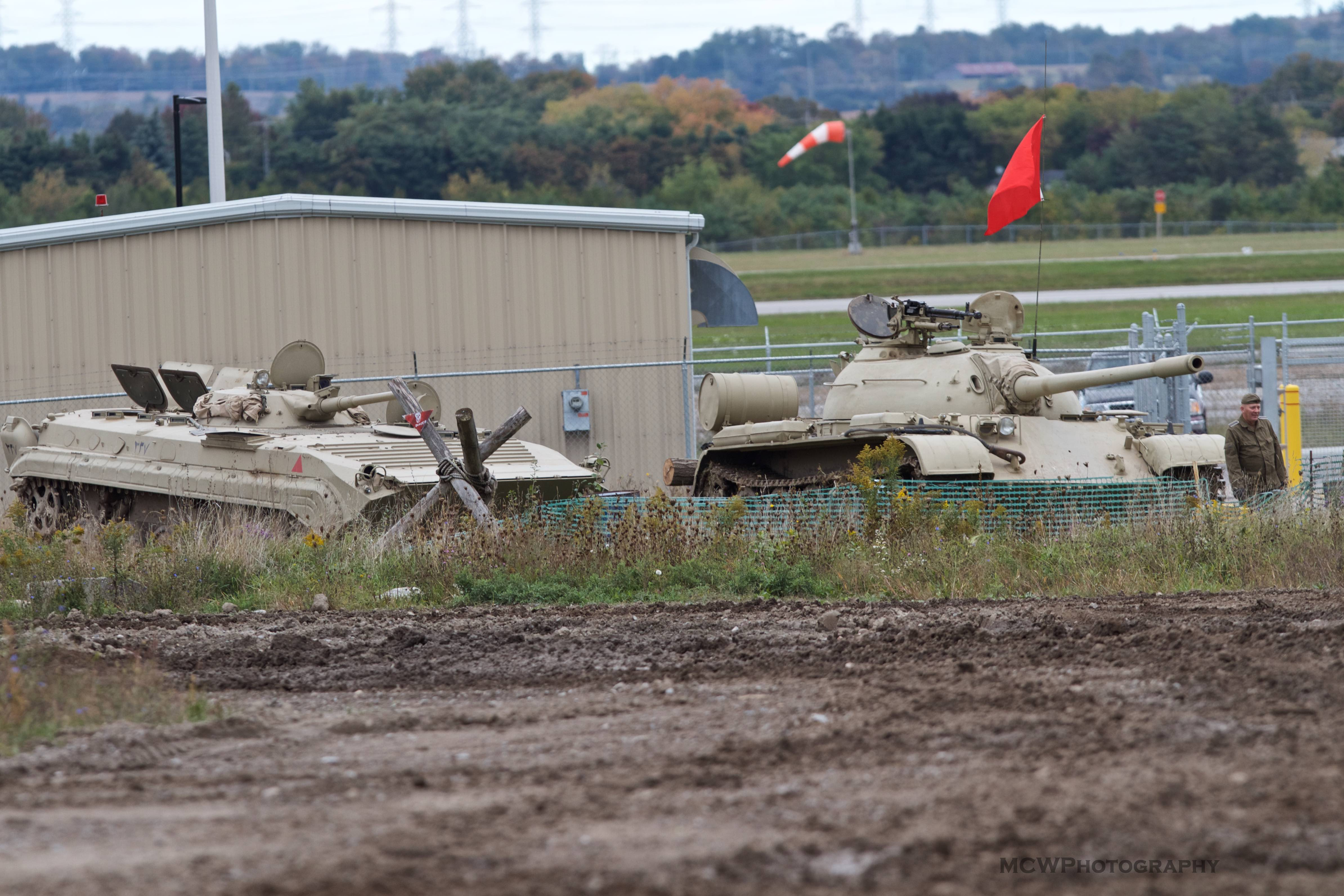
T-54A and BMP 1 at Ontario Regiment Museum during Tank Saturday

==== Cold War ====
- T54A - Our T54 is in Iraqi colours
- BMP-1 - Along with the T54A, this was the bulk of Soviet Cold War Armour
- M60 - The Museum operates a US Army and US Marine Corps M60A3
- Leopard 1 - Five Leopards including C1 and C2 variants.
- M113 - Both US and Canadian versions along with engineering, TOW, and Communications variants.
- Centurion - Running again after 40 years.
- Chieftain - Mark 10 and Mark 11
- FV432 - British Armoured Personnel Carrier
- M151 MUTT - Canadian and US Jeep
- M551 Sheridan - Air droppable and amphibious tank

==== Gulf War ====
- CVR-T - British family of Combat Vehicles Reconnaissance - Tracked, Examples of all members of the family are at the Museum
- AVGP - Canadian family of Armoured Vehicles - Cougar (Fire Support), Grizzly (Personnel Carrier), Husky (Recovery)
- HUMMWV - USMC version with .50 cal mount

==== Modern era ====
- LAV III - Iconic vehicle used by Canadian Forces in Afghanistan
- M113 TLAV - M113 A3 upgraded for Canadian Service
- Sandcat Armoured Patrol Vehicle
- Land Rover Wolf

Since December 2022, a new exhibit features a rare WW2 Howitzer Motor Carriage M7B1, often referred to as the M7 Priest. More than 4,000 of the U.S.-made M7 Priests were built during the war. The tank was used by the Americans, the British, the Canadians and the Free French. Many of the Canadian soldiers who stormed Juno Beach on D-Day advanced in M7 Priests.

== Events ==
The museum holds special events where the public can watch vehicles of the collection in motion. These include Tank Saturdays and the internationally recognized Aquino Weekend.

=== Tank Saturdays ===
Tank Saturdays are single-day events, normally on the second Saturday of each summer month (May to October). These are themed events with a one-hour display show based on that theme. Often, re-enactors will be a part of the show. Armoured vehicle rides are usually available. Tank Saturdays conclude with a "Battle Royale" where two tanks and their crews go head-to-head in the museum's tank arena.

=== Aquino Weekend ===
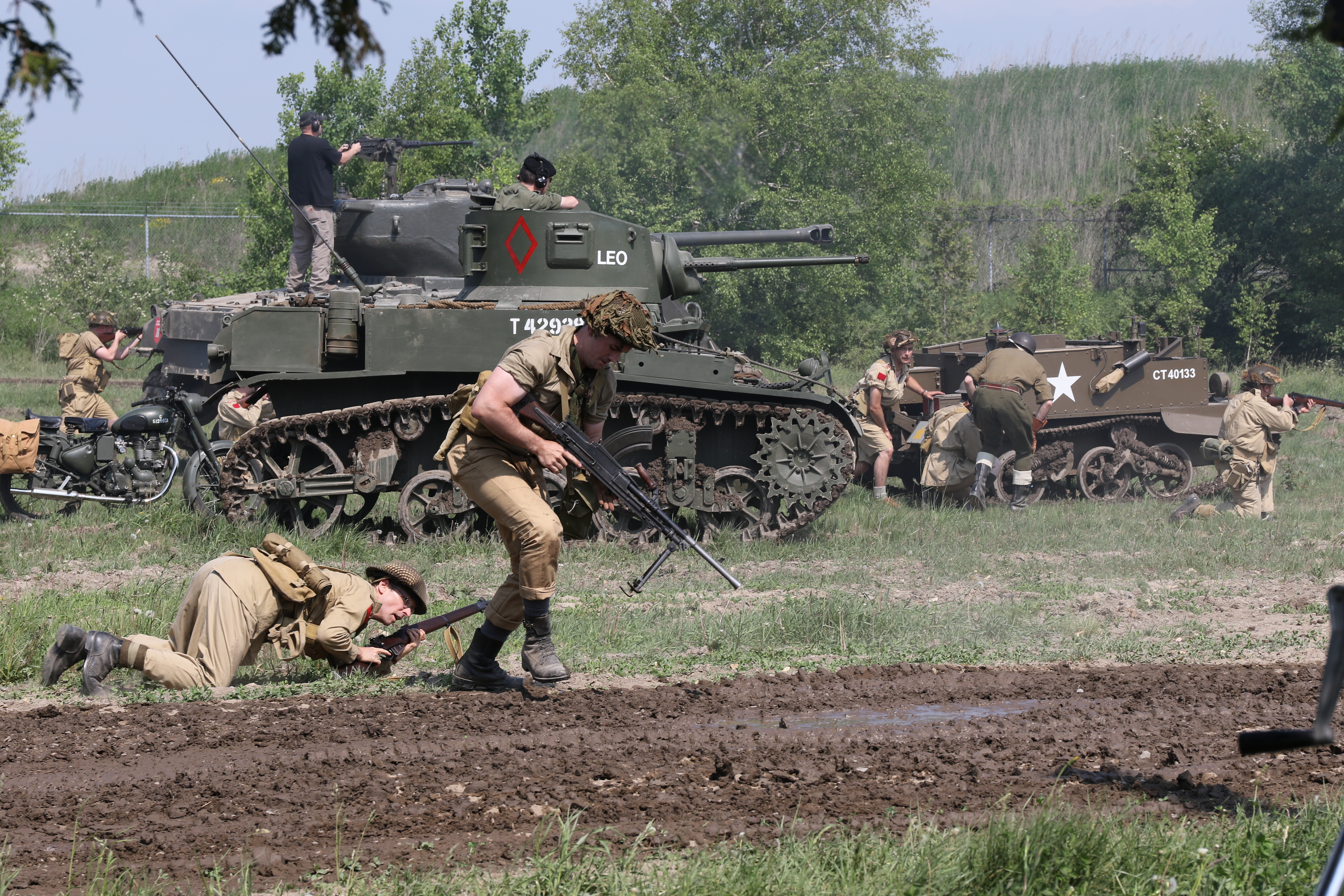
A picture from the Ontario Regiment Museum's Aquino tank weekend, 30 May 2015.

Aquino Weekend is a two-day world-class event held during the second weekend in June, and, from 2024, in July. There are two themed one-hour battle demonstrations on both Saturday and Sunday. Common themes are "WW2 - Western Front", "WW2 - Eastern Front", "Gulf War", and "Viet Nam". Each simulated battle consists of vehicles, reenactors, firepower and pyrotechnics. Additionally, there are vendors and static reenactor displays. Each day concludes with a "Battle Royale" where two tanks and their crews go head-to-head in the Museum's tank arena.

=== Tank rides and experiences ===
The museum offers experiences in their historic vehicles. These experiences are more than rides; they can be a full experience working with the crews preparing the vehicle and a complete tour of all the crew positions.

=== Tours ===
Group or specialized tours are also available. Interested parties should contact the museum to enquire about availability.

== World of Tanks ==
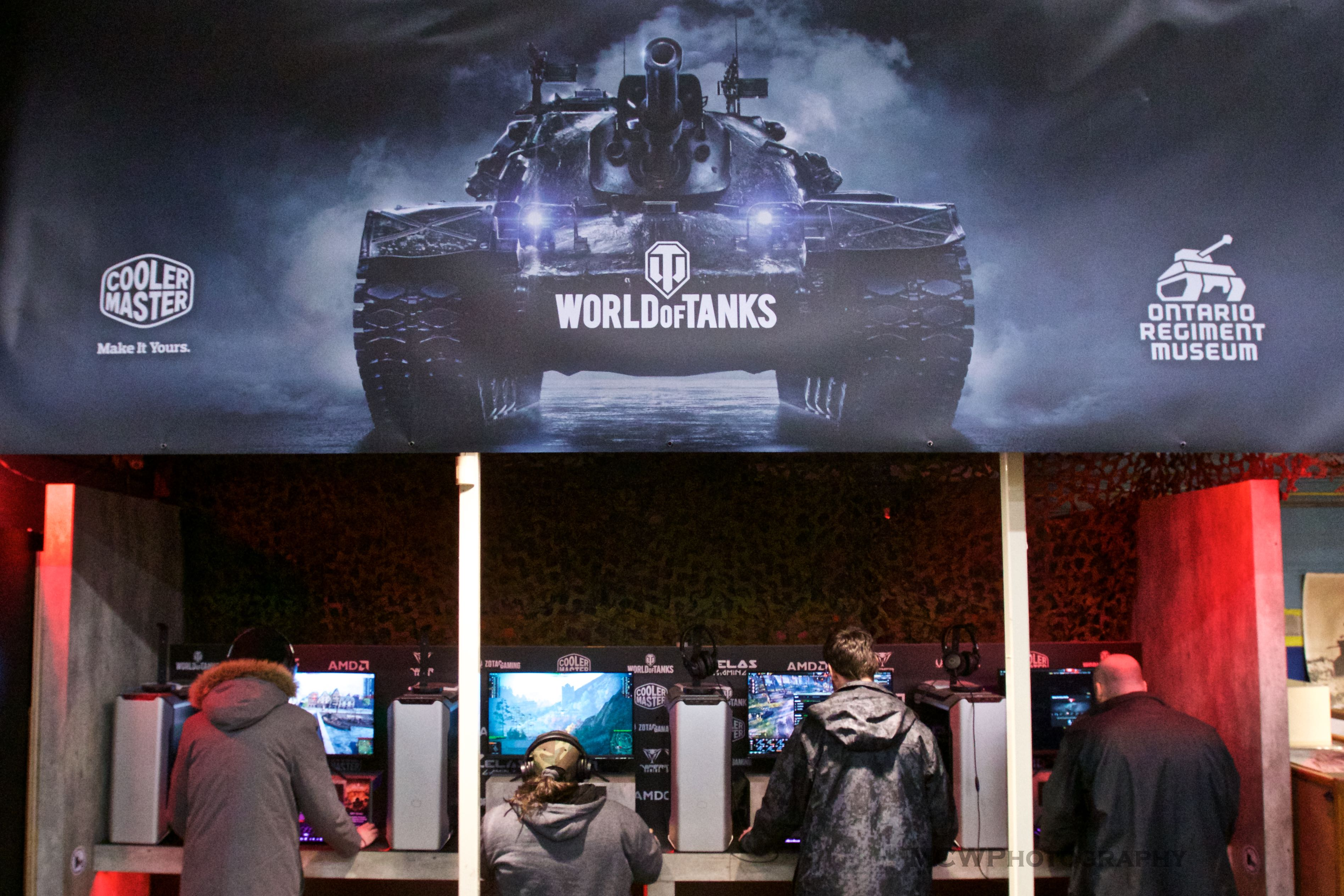
World of Tanks Gaming Station at Ontario Regiment Museum

The computer game World of Tanks is a partner of the Ontario Regiment RCAC Museum. There is a World of Tanks gaming station at the museum where visitors can play the game on fast optimized personal computers, with standard WOT vehicles or customized vehicles from the museum.

== See also ==
- The Ontario Regiment (RCAC), Oshawa, Ontario
- Ontario Regiment Ferret Club, Oshawa, Ontario
- Oshawa Military and Industrial Museum, Oshawa, Ontario
- Royal Canadian Armoured Corps

== Other tank museums ==
- Musée des Blindés – France
- The Tank Museum – United Kingdom
- Yad La-Shiryon – Latrun, Israel
- Parola Tank Museum – Finland
- Military museum Lešany – Czech Republic
- German Tank Museum – Germany
- Military Museum, Belgrade – Serbia
- Canadian War Museum – Ottawa, Ontario
- Base Borden Military Museum – Canada
- Dutch Cavalry Museum – Amersfoort, The Netherlands
- Nationaal Militair Museum – Soesterberg, The Netherlands
- Royal Tank Museum – Jordan
- American Heritage Museum – United States
- Royal Australian Armoured Corps Memorial and Army Tank Museum – Puckapunyal, Australia
- Australian Armour and Artillery Museum – Cairns, Australia
