= Oshawa Executive Airport =

Airport in Ontario, Canada

Oshawa Executive Airport Aéroport d’Oshawa
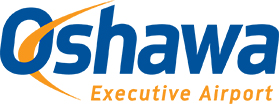

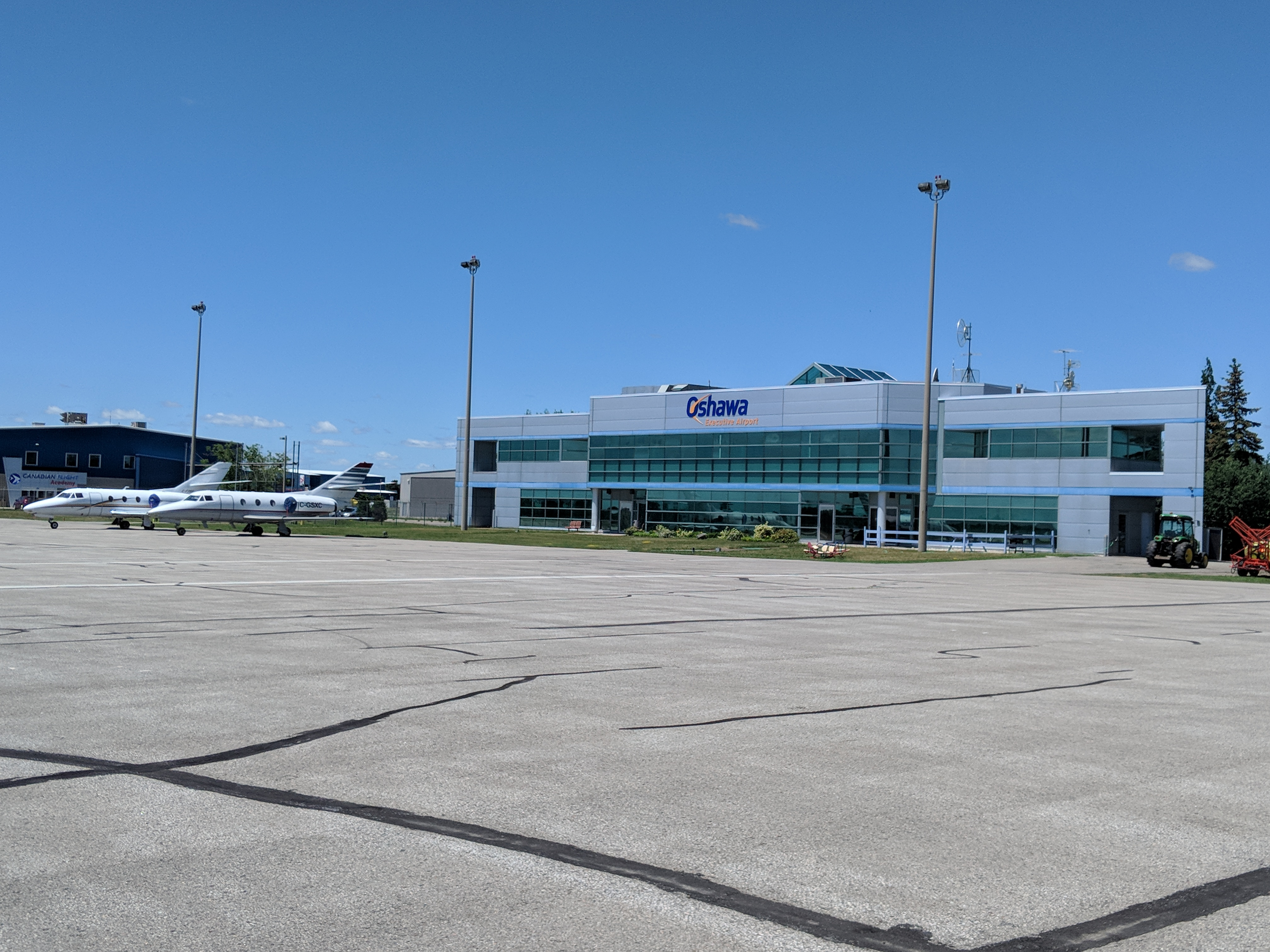
- IATA: YOO; ICAO: CYOO; WMO: 71697

Summary
- Airport type: Public
- Owner/Operator: City of Oshawa
- Serves: Greater Toronto and Durham Region
- Location: Oshawa, Ontario
- Opened: June 1941; 85 years ago
- Time zone: EST (UTC−05:00)
  - Summer (DST): EDT (UTC−04:00)
- Elevation AMSL: 460 ft (140 m)
- Coordinates: 43°55′22″N 078°53′47″W
- Website: Oshawa Executive Airport

Map
- Location in Ontario CYOO (Ontario) CYOO (Canada)

Runways
Direction	Length		Surface
Direction	ft	m	Surface
05/23	2,654	809	Asphalt
12/30	5,057	1,541	Asphalt

Statistics (2019)
- Aircraft movements: 89,805
- Sources: AIP Canada Supplement; Canada Flight Supplement; Environment Canada; Movements from Statistics Canada

Oshawa Executive Airport (IATA: YOO, ICAO: CYOO) is a municipal airport adjacent to the north end of the city of Oshawa, Ontario, Canada. It is the busiest general aviation airport without scheduled airline service in the Greater Toronto Area by aircraft movements and one of the busiest general aviation only airports in Canada. It includes two paved runways and instrument approaches.

From 2002 to 2008, Oshawa hosted the annual Canadian Aviation Expo, Canada's largest annual aviation event, before the expo moved to John C. Munro Hamilton International Airport in 2009. Oshawa Airport now hosts the Girls Take Flight event that takes place every spring.

The airport is classified as an airport of entry by Nav Canada and is staffed on call by the Canada Border Services Agency. CBSA officers at this airport can handle aircraft with no more than 50 passengers. The officers also provided weekday call out for general aviation arriving from outside Canada to Buttonville Municipal Airport in nearby Markham before that airport was closed in 2023.

== History ==
The airport opened in June 1941 under the British Commonwealth Air Training Plan as No. 20 Elementary Flying Training School RCAF Station Oshawa. Student flyers used Tiger Moth aircraft and were trained by civilian instructors from the Oshawa, Kingston, and Brant-Norfolk flying clubs. A relief landing field was located at Whitby. The school closed in December 1944 and the airfield was turned over to the Department of Transport. The then-Town of Oshawa took over the facility in 1947.

The planned construction of a Pickering Airport, between Oshawa and Toronto, raised questions about the future of the Oshawa airport. In 2018 the mayor of nearby Pickering made the construction of a new modern jet airport in Pickering a key part of his platform, winning a landslide victory. Local media continues to report that there remains strong opposition to the construction of the Pickering Airport by some residents. This project was initiated in 1972, then placed on hold in 1975. The Greater Toronto Airports Authority (GTAA) is not related to Oshawa Airport in any way and as of 2011 has no further role in Pickering Airports development.

In 2008 the City of Oshawa adopted the Oshawa Municipal Airport Business Plan which includes a commitment to operate the airport for a minimum of 25 years. Dozens of upgrades completed by 2010 include construction of new Taxiway "C", Phase 1 of Hangarminium Complex, cardlock fuel facility, and Automated Weather Observation System.

On July 11, 2011, Ornge Air Medivac announced that it would open a 24-hour base to help cut the airlift response time to Toronto hospitals. This plan was cancelled in 2013.

In 2011–2012, local politicians and the contracted airport management were endeavouring to expand the main runway from 4,000 to 5,000 ft (1,200 to 1,500 m) to acquire additional and larger corporate traffic. This was met with much opposition, as the existing surrounding community is already in close proximity of the runway and the flight paths. The surrounding community asserts that increasing activity at an airport closely nested among residential communities is irresponsible. The surrounding community is also concerned that they are not being represented appropriately by the local standing committees. The proposal to expand was delayed at a public meeting on December 5, 2011, as there was not enough room in the Oshawa Council Chambers to accommodate all of the public that showed up in opposition. A new meeting date was to be set sometime in January 2012. After the meeting and great opposition from the general public, it was decided in August 2012 that the expansion project would be cancelled. There has been no revival of the expansion plan since.

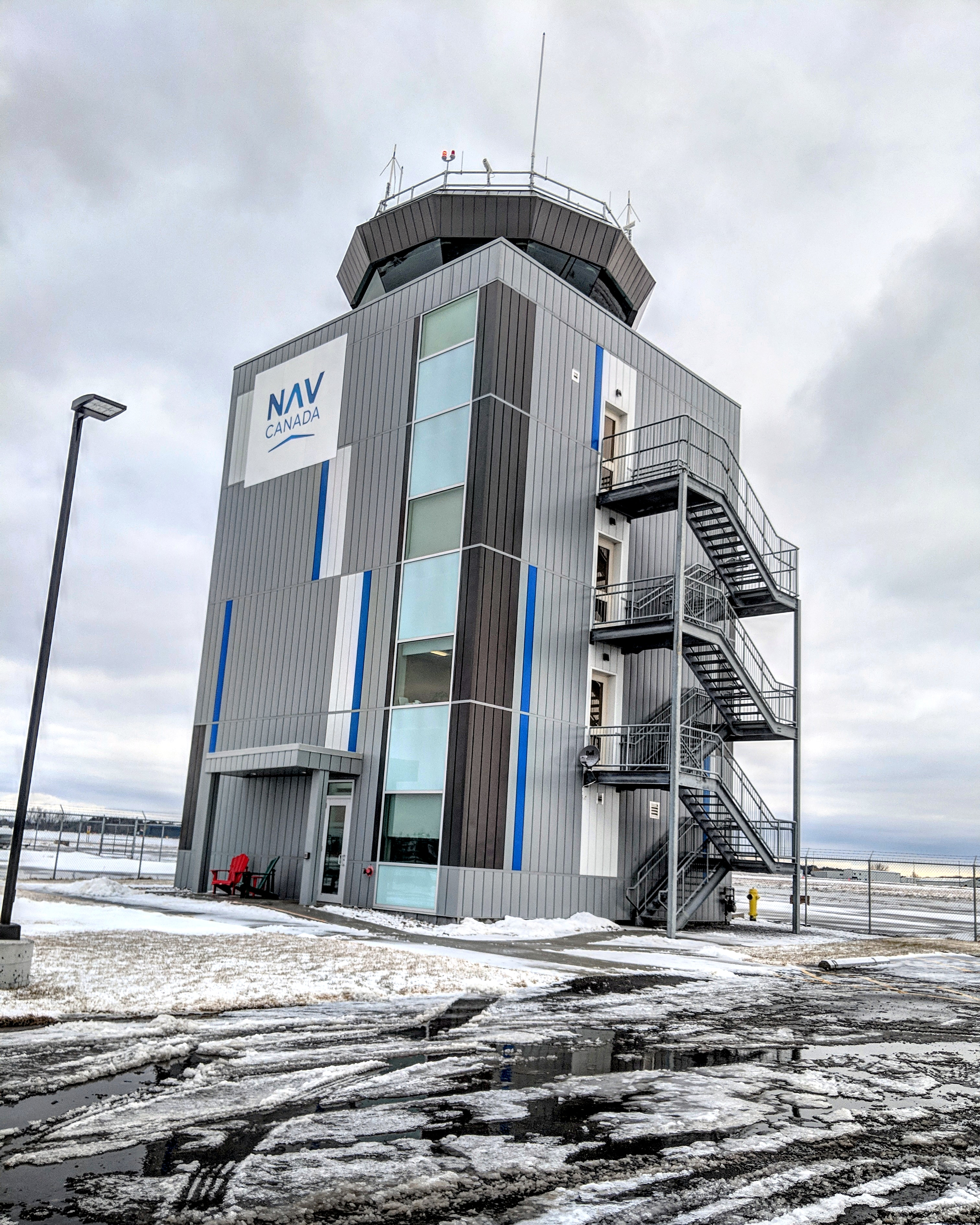
New Nav Canada control tower in Oshawa

In 2016, the City of Oshawa approved a $6 million plan to reconstruct runway 12-30 that would involve an estimated four-week closure of the airport to all fixed-wing aircraft. The construction started on September 5, 2017, and the runway reopened on October 10, 2017. The airport added new LED edge lights and PAPIs on runway 12–30 to improve night and low advisability conditions. During this time Nav Canada approved and started construction on a new control tower to the northwest of the original tower that was built over 50 years earlier. The new tower was estimated to cost $9 million and opened for use in June 2018.

On November 1, 2018, Nav Canada announced the closure of Markham's Buttonville Municipal Airport's control tower and weather office effective January 3, 2019. The terminal area forecast station was installed at Oshawa Executive and scheduled to be operational on the same day that Buttonville shut down its facility.

In 2024, runway 12/30 was extended to 4,675 feet (1,425 m).

In March of 2026, Canadian Flight Academy (CFA) relocated to Peterborough Regional Airport, due to an expired lease.

== Facilities ==
Oshawa Executive Airport is managed and maintained by Total Aviation & Airport Solutions under contract from the operator, the City of Oshawa. TAAS also operate and control the fuel pumps on the North Apron.

Commercial radio stations CKDO and CKGE-FM, licensed to Oshawa, and CJKX, licensed to Ajax, operate from studios on the Oshawa Airport grounds. These organizations operate on former airport land at the entrances to the airport on Taunton Road: Mandarin Chinese Buffet restaurant; Taunton Health Centre, part of the largest, multi-specialty medical group practice in Canada, including Urgent Care, Laboratory, Pharmacy and a dental office aptly named, The Airport Dental Centre; Airport Self Storage Ltd., with ten buildings on six acres; National Defence, The Ontario Regiment, Royal Canadian Armoured Corps, Oshawa Airport Armoury; and the Durham Children's Aid Society.

A live fire training simulator opened south of the control tower in October 2009. It is a partnership between Durham College and the fire departments of Clarington, Oshawa and Whitby.

=== Fixed-base operator ===
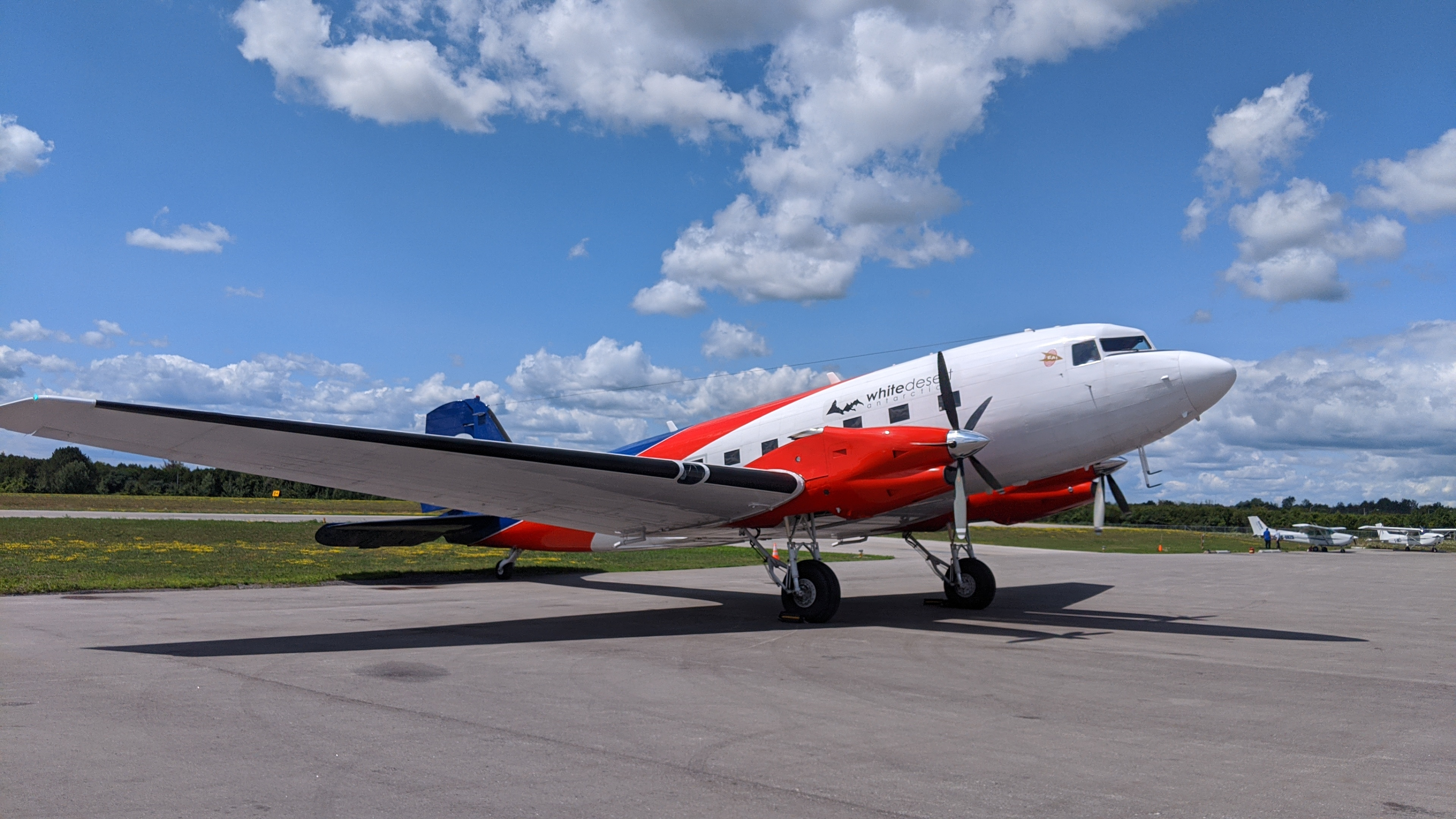
ALCI Aviation Basler BT-67 at Enterprise Apron. Commonly used at Oshawa Airport.

Enterprise Airlines is currently the only full-service FBO at the airport. Enterprise officially opened its doors in 1994 at the original location on the south end of the field next to the old control tower. Enterprise moved to the northwest corner of the field in 2000. The FBO stays open 24 hours per day, 7 days a week, operating for medevac services and the police air support unit.

=== Tenants ===
- Airborne Sensing
- Air Nunavut
- ALCI Aviation
- Amaris Premium Aviation
- Aviation Unlimited (aircraft sales)
- Canadian Flight Academy/Toronto Airways Limited (flight training)
- Canadian Owners and Pilots Association
- Canada Border Services Agency (on call)
- Corporate Aircraft Restorations
- Durham Aviation Services Ltd.
- Durham Flight Centre (flight training)
- Durham Region Branch, Ontario Genealogical Society
- Durham Regional Police Service Air Support Unit
- Enterprise Airlines (AvFuel FBO)
- Girls Take Flight (annual event)
- Gemini Gymnastics
- Jeffery Homes
- Nav Canada (control tower)
- Optech Inc.
- Oshawa Airport Golf Club
- Oshawa Military and Industrial Museum
- R.C.A.F. 420 Wing, Royal Canadian Air Force Association
- Recreational Aircraft Association, Oshawa District
- Robert Stuart Aviation Museum
- Ryan Terminal (FBO)
- Skyway Cafe
- Smooth Air Charters
- Total Aviation & Airport Solutions
- W.G. Cox Aviation Supply

== Emergency services ==
- Oshawa Fire Services
- Durham Region EMS

== See also ==
- List of airports in the Greater Toronto Area
- RCAF Station Oshawa
