= Ontario Regiment RCAC Regimental Museum =

Accredited Canadian Forces Museum

Coordinates: 43.92018°N 78.89467°W

The Ontario Regiment (RCAC) Museum
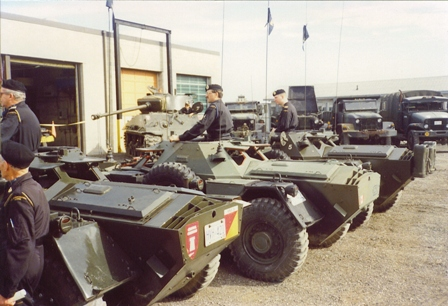
- Established: 1980
- Location: Oshawa, Ontario, Canada
- Website: http://www.ontrmuseum.ca (Official)

The Oshawa Military and Industrial Museum, also known as The Ontario Regiment (RCAC) "Ferret Club," is an accredited Canadian Forces Museum located in Oshawa, Ontario, Canada. Founded in 1980, it has evolved into the Historic Vehicle Section of the Ontario Regiment Museum.

The museum's maintainers are a group of volunteer military vehicle enthusiasts. The group includes civilians as well as several current and former members of the RCAC, and other units of the Canadian Army and the Canadian Armed Forces (CAF).

== Description ==
Almost every vehicle in the museum's collection is operational or in some state of repair or restoration. Many vehicles, including the vintage Sherman Mark IV, Chaffee, M60 and Sheridan tanks, armored personnel carriers, trucks and jeeps, are frequently driven in parades and other ceremonial activities involving the Ontario Regiment or other units of the CAF.

The funding required to restore, maintain, and fuel the museum's historic vehicle collection and static displays is provided entirely by volunteers—current and former members of the Canadian Forces, veterans, cadets and civilians. The museum raises some of its operating funds by providing the use of some vehicles for select recognizable Canadian and international television or film productions. Many vehicles in the museum's collection are visible from Stevenson Rd N, the road leading into the south field of the Oshawa Executive Airport.

== Historical development ==
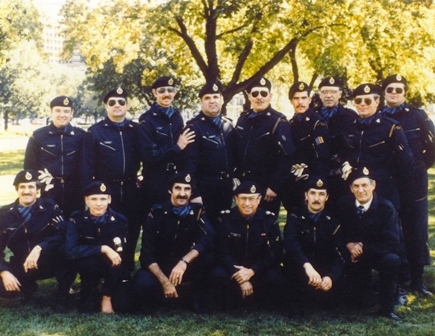
The Originals: Several ONTR NCOs and soldiers (retired and serving) along with former CO LCol Skea (front middle) formed the Ferret Club's original cadre in 1980

The museum was founded in 1980 as the Ontario Regiment Ferret Club. Housed in a garage in north Oshawa, the collection began with nine fully restored surplus Canadian Ferret armoured cars.

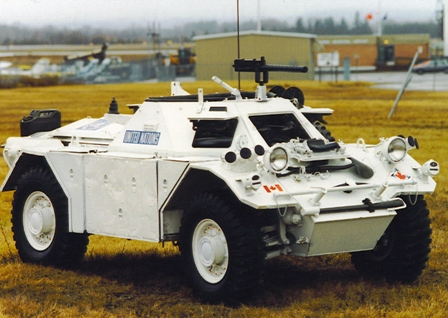
Ferret Scout Car in Canadian UN detail, 1993

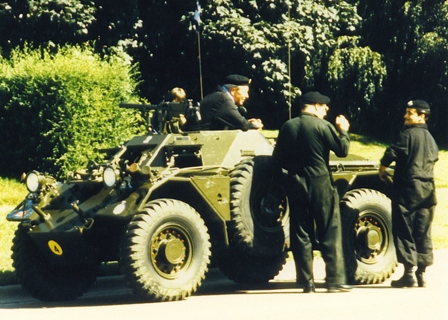
First parade: (From left) ONT R HLCol Wilton, with CO LCol Morin and USO Capt Wilkinson (8CH), Oshawa, 1981

The club was relocated to a disused dairy farm on Oshawa's 8th Concession for much of the 1980s before finding a permanent home on the Oshawa Airport lands, one of the many British Commonwealth Air Training Plan sites for allied pilots during the Second World War.

== Collections ==
=== Historic Vehicle Section (Ferret Club) ===
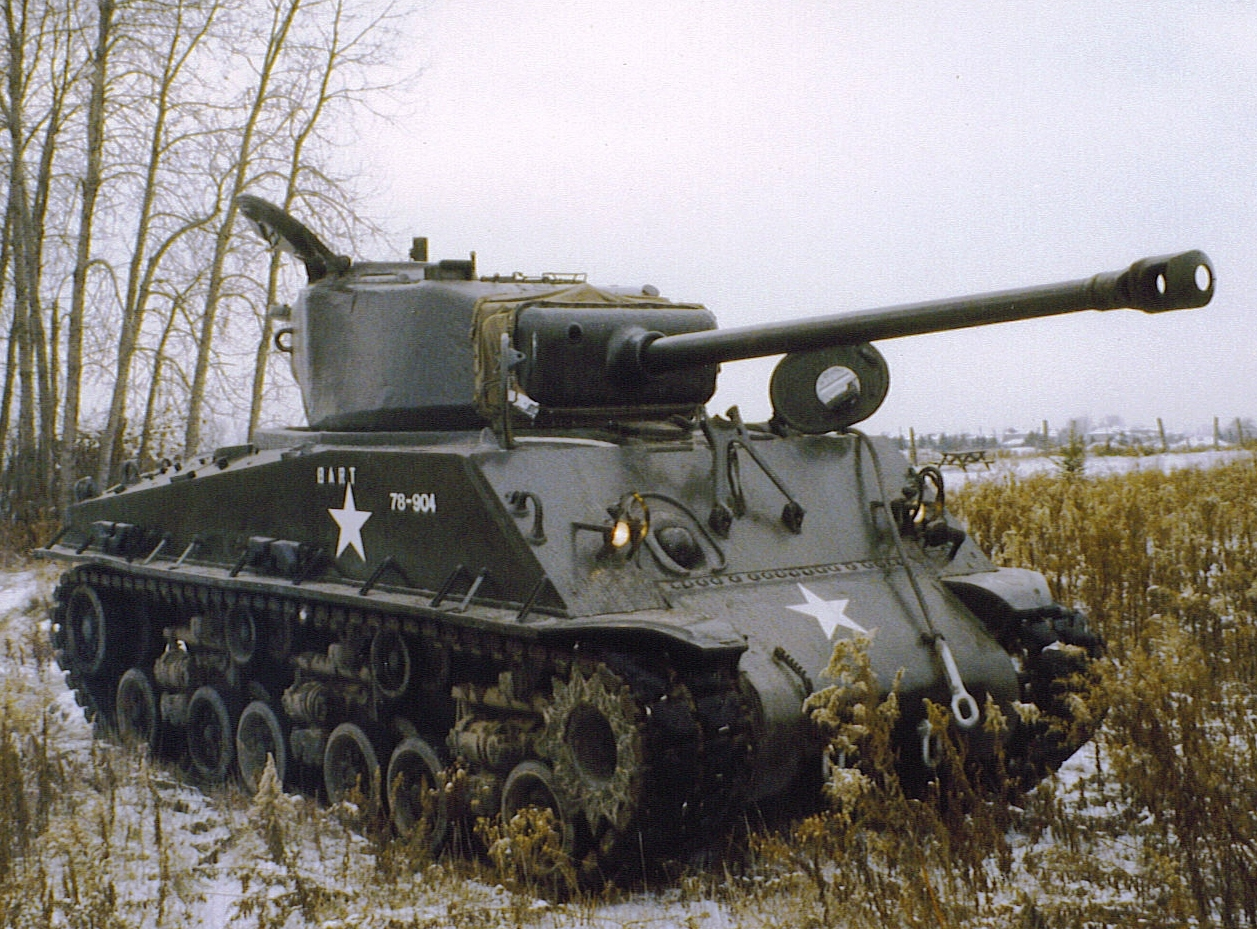
Bart: Mark IV Sherman tank of the Ontario Regiment (RCAC) Museum, 1993

The museum's collection contains over 70 vehicles, including jeeps, carry-alls, carriers, tanks and a motorcycle. Aside from fully restored Bren Gun Carrier and M24 Chaffee, a pair of M4A2(76)W HVSS, and one unrestored Centurion, there are also a number of foreign-operated vehicles including a Scania HLVW prototype.

Other highlights of the collection include two M60A3s and two M551A1 Sheridans. A number of ex-US Army M113A2s are maintained and driven regularly, as are the M113C&R Lynx. Soft-skin vehicles include a number of examples of different Canadian military pattern vehicles, as well as many jeeps and examples of the Dodge M37. Post-war trucks are also on display.

=== Static Display Section ===
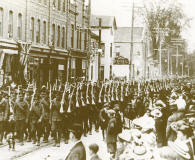
116thBn rifle company marched through Oshawa on 27 May 1916

The museum's Static Display Section consists of uniforms, medals, photographs, diaries, historical books and artifacts relevant to the history of the Regiment, the Royal Canadian Armoured Corps, and the Canadian Army from the 1850s to the present day. These artifacts are displayed in diorama settings depicting their era of use. Among the medals displayed include those of past members of the Ontario Regiment, including the original Order of Canada awarded to its longest-serving Honorary Colonel, RS (Sam) McLaughlin.
