= Oshawa Civic Band =

The Oshawa Civic Band is a traditional Canadian "British" brass band based in the city of Oshawa, Ontario. It is similar to the bands of The Salvation Army, which means that all parts, except for the bass trombone and percussion, are in treble clef, and the instrumentation is made up of Eb Soprano Cornet, Solo, 1st/Repiano, 2nd and 3rd Bb Cornets, Bb Flugal Horn, Solo, 1st and 2nd Eb Tenor Horns, 1st and 2nd Baritones, Euphonium, 1st and 2nd (Tenor) Trombones, Bass Trombone, EEb and BBb bass and percussion.

== History ==
=== Military service ===
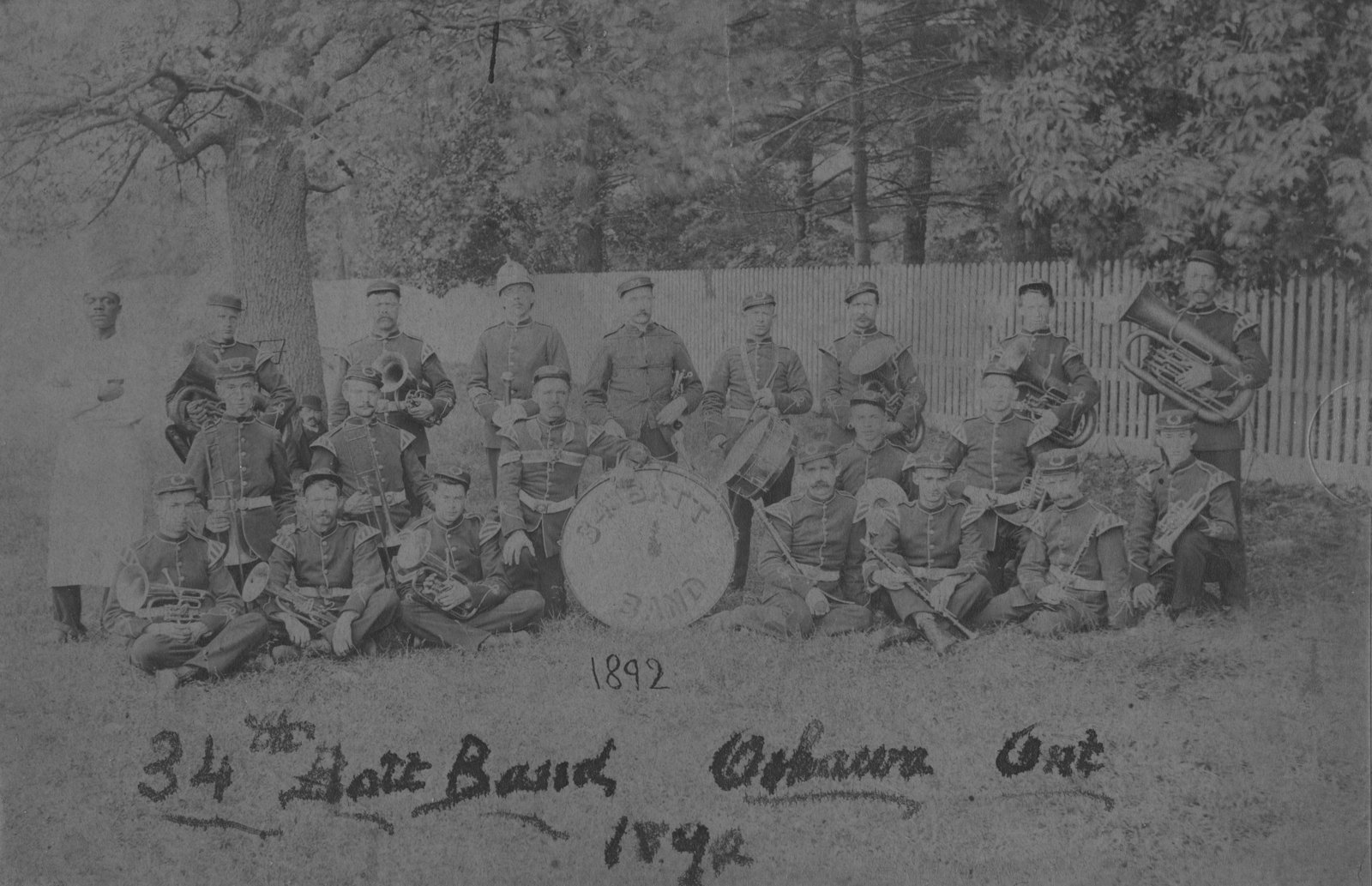
A photograph of the 34th Battalion military band, with instruments, taken in 1892.

The band began life in 1870 as the band of the 34th Ontario Regiment, and was a traditional Military band. In 1920, the regimental band merged with the Oshawa Citizens' Band, to become the Oshawa Civic and Regimental Band. As time passed the band evolved into its current configuration. In 1942, a bandshell and a bandroom were built in Oshawa's Memorial Park for use by the group, with the sponsorship of industrialist Samuel McLaughlin.

=== Civilian service ===
Official ties with the regiment were ended in 1968 due to budget cuts by the federal government as a result of the Unification of the Canadian Armed Forces. After this, Naval Lieutenant Bill Askew intervened in the destruction of the band's history, resulting in it officially assuming the name of Oshawa Civic band and has since become incorporated. Many of the former regimental bandsmen continue to play with the Civic Band today. The band performs regular outdoor concerts in Oshawa during the summer months, as well as at special events and ceremonies. The band has often performed in concert with other musical groups, including the Festival Singers and the County Town Singers. In 2016, the band recorded a CD.
