= 182nd Battalion (Ontario County), CEF =

The 182nd Battalion (Ontario County), CEF was a unit in the Canadian Expeditionary Force during the First World War. Based in Whitby, Ontario, the unit began recruiting during the winter of 1915/16 in Ontario County, Ontario. After sailing to England in May 1917, the battalion was either absorbed into the 18th Reserve Battalion or into the 3rd Canadian Reserve Battalion (Central Ontario). The 182nd Battalion (Ontario County), CEF had one Officer Commanding: Lieut-Col. A. A. Cockburn.

The 182nd Battalion (Ontario County), CEF, is perpetuated by The Ontario Regiment (RCAC).
