= Canadian Aviation Expo =

Type	Tradeshow and Fly-in
Founded	1992
Headquarters	Oshawa, Ontario, Canada
Held at	Canadian Warplane Heritage
Website	www.canadianaviationexpo.com

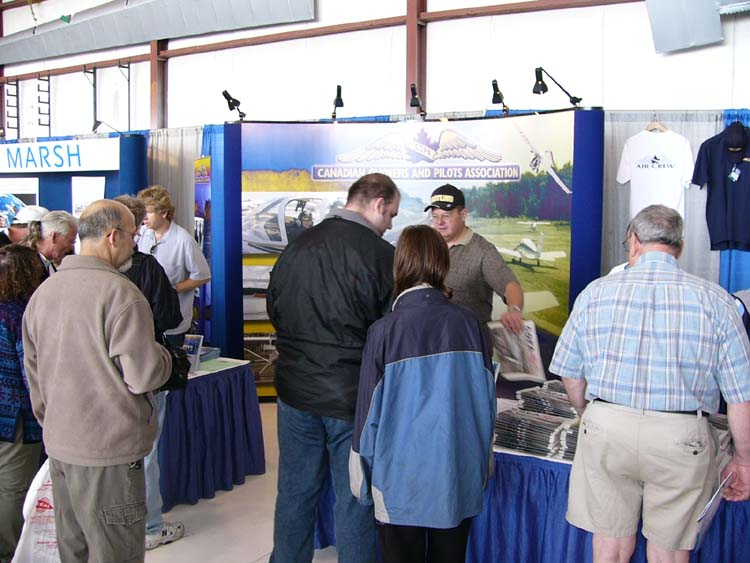
COPA's booth, part of the tradeshow at the 2004 Canadian Aviation Expo

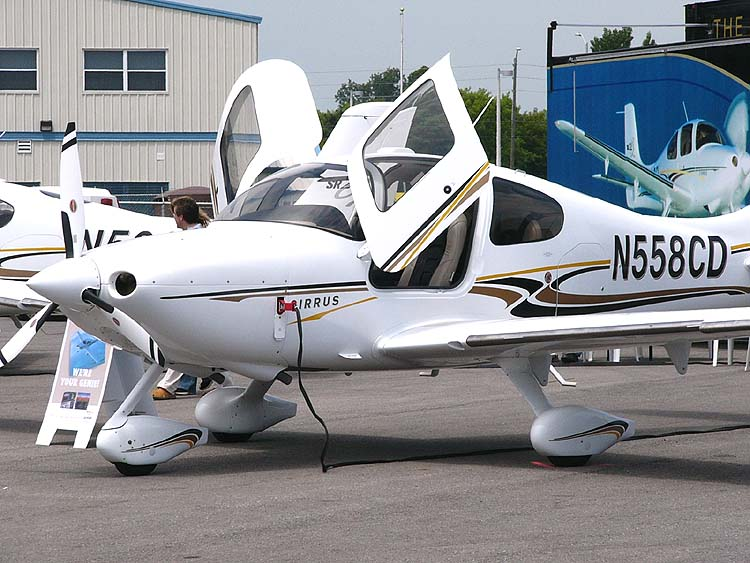
A Cirrus SR22 on display at the Expo in 2004

The Canadian Aviation Expo (CAE) was Canada's largest aviation event, combining a three-day tradeshow with a fly-in. Except for 2007 it included an airshow. The Expo was held annually at the beginning of May at various airports across the GTHA. The event attracted about 20,000 visitors per year.

== History ==
The event was started as the Toronto Aviation & Aircraft Show in 1993 by Toronto Air Traffic Controller Eamonn Flynn, and was held at the Toronto International Centre, adjacent Toronto Pearson International Airport. In 1994, requiring a greatly increased display area, it was moved to the Canadian Airlines hangar at Toronto Pearson International Airport, and later to accommodate a fly-in aspect of the show, moved to Downsview Airport in north Toronto. The business was purchased prior to the 2001 show by Stephen Wilcox. The move to the Oshawa Airport was made in 2002 and the name was changed to Canadian Aviation Expo at the same time.

In 2009 the Expo moved from Oshawa Airport to Hamilton Airport where it used the facilities of the Canadian Warplane Heritage Museum in a joint show.

The event has not been held since 2014.

== Management ==
Principals in the operation of the show since 2002 have been Stephen Wilcox, Steve Nichols and John Green.

== Sponsors ==
The Expo's major sponsor since 2002 has been Breitling.

A major supporter of this event is the Canadian Owners and Pilots Association who held their annual convention in conjunction with the CAE in both 2003 and 2006.

== See also ==
- History of aviation in Canada
