= Fire services in Durham Region =

Fire services in Durham Region, Ontario, Canada, are provided by each municipality. There are 27 fire stations across the region.

== Operations ==
Ajax Fire and Emergency Services consists of 100 full-time staff operating from three fire halls. The department has six pumpers, two aerials, a pumper/tanker and rescue truck. The stations are as follows:

- Hall 41 - 40 Westney Road North
- Hall 42 - 435 Monarch Avenue
- Hall 43 - HQ - 900 Salem Road North

Brock Township Fire Department is mainly a part-time operation, with 68 part-time staff and a full-time chief, full-time fire prevention officer operating from three fire halls. Vehicles operated include four pumpers, three rescue vehicles and three tankers. The department operates from the following stations:

- Station 8-1- Sunderland
- Station 8-2 - Cannington
- Station 8-3 - Beaverton

Clarington Fire Services consists of 50 full-time staff and approximately 120 part-time staff operating from five fire halls. Equipment consists of seven pumpers, one aerial, one rescue, one brush truck and five tankers. The department operates from the following stations:

- Hall #11 - 2240 Highway 2, Bowmanville (HQ) (Staffed by full-time firefighters)
- Hall #12 - 247 King St. East, Newcastle (Staffed by full time & part-time firefighters)
- Hall #13 - 5708 Main St., Orono Staffed by part-time firefighters)
- Hall #14 - 2611 Trulls Rd., Courtice (Staffed by full-time firefighters)
- Hall #15 - 2354 Concession 8, Enniskillen Staffed by part-time firefighters)

Oshawa Fire Services consists of over 238 full-time staff operating from six fire stations. The service operates six pumpers, two aerials, two rescues, and one tanker. There are six fire stations:

- Station #1 - 199 Adelaide Avenue West (HQ)
- Station #2 - 1111 Simcoe Street South
- Station #3 - 50 Beatrice Street East
- Station #4 - 50 Harmony Road North
- Station #5 - 1550 Harmony Road North
- Station #6 - 2631 Simcoe St. North

Oshawa Fire Services responds to calls at Oshawa Executive Airport.

Pickering Fire Services consists of 101 full-time staff operating from 4 fire halls. The service has five pumper/rescues, an aerial device, three tankers, one heavy rescue, a brush truck, and one support/rehab unit. All stations are full-time halls and are as follows:

- Hall # 52 - 553 Kingston Road
- Hall # 54 - 4941 Old Brock Road, Claremont
- Hall # 55 - 1616 Bayly Street - (HQ) opened 1970
- Hall # 56 - 1115 Finch Avenue

Hall # 1 was located at Kingston Road at Rosebank Road in a quonset hut. Old Station 2 on Pickering Beach Road is now in Ajax, Ontario. The old Brougham Fire Hall later became Station 3 and is now an abandoned antiques store on Highway 7 between Old Brock Road and Brougham Road.

Scugog Township Fire Department is mainly a part-time operation, but there are a number of full-time staff. The department operates five pumpers and two rescue units from two fire halls. These stations are:

- Hall #61 - 30 Crandel St., Port Perry
- Hall #62 - 3550 Durham Road 57, Caesarea

Uxbridge Fire Department consists of two full-time staff and 40 part-time staff operating from one fire hall. Equipment consists of three pumpers, one tanker and a rescue. The single station is located at 301 Brock Street West. Station 71

Whitby Fire and Emergency Services consists of over 140 full-time staff operating from 5 fire halls. The department has eight pumpers, two elevated platforms, a tanker and rescue truck. The stations are as follows:

- Station # 31 - 6745 Baldwin St., Brooklin
- Station # 32 - 1600 Manning Rd.
- Station # 33 - 1501 Brock St. South
- Station # 34 (formerly #6) - 734 Dundas St. West
- Station # 35 - 111 McKinney Dr. (HQ)
- proposed new fire halls**
- Station #36 - West Whitby Development (Rossland/Cornation Road)
- Station #37 & Training Grounds - Cochrane Street/Highway #7 Area Brooklin West

== See also ==
- Durham Regional Police Service
- Durham Region EMS
- Vancouver Fire and Rescue Services
- PARA-Marine Search and Rescue
