= RCAF Station Oshawa =

Former Canadian military airfield in Ontario

- Oshawa, Ontario; Near Oshawa, Ontario in Canada

Site information
- Operator: Royal Canadian Air Force

Location
- Location within Ontario
- Coordinates: 43°53′N 78°54′W

Airfield information
- Identifiers: IATA: none, ICAO: none
- Elevation: 450 ft (140 m) AMSL
Runways
Direction	Length and surface
6/24	2,640 ft (800 m) Hard Surfaced
14/32	2,625 ft (800 m) Hard Surfaced
8/26	2,635 ft (803 m) Hard Surfaced

RCAF Station Oshawa was a training station of the British Commonwealth Air Training Plan (BCATP) during World War II located near Oshawa, Ontario, Canada.

The No. 20 Elementary Flying Training School (EFTS) was located in Oshawa from June 1941 to December 1944. Student flyers used Tiger Moth aircraft and were trained by civilian instructors from the Oshawa, Kingston, and Brant-Norfolk flying clubs. A relief landing field was located at Whitby (at Hopkins Street and Gerdau Court now an industrial site).

The military left in 1944 but as federal owned until sale to then Town of Oshawa in 1947. The airport is still in use as the Oshawa Executive Airport.

== Aerodrome information ==
In approximately 1942 the aerodrome was listed as RCAF Aerodrome - Oshawa, Ontario at 43°53′N 78°54′W with a variation of 8 degrees west and elevation of 450 ft (140 m). The aerodrome was listed with three runways as follows:

Runway Name	Length	Width	Surface
6/24	2,640 ft (800 m)	150 ft (46 m)	Hard Surfaced
14/32	2,625 ft (800 m)	150 ft (46 m)	Hard Surfaced
8/26	2,635 ft (803 m)	150 ft (46 m)	Hard Surfaced

== Relief landing field - Whitby ==
In approximately 1942 the aerodrome was listed as RCAF Aerodrome - Whitby, Ontario at 43°51′N 78°55′W with a variation of 8 degrees west and elevation of 275 ft (84 m). The aerodrome was listed as a "Turf - All-way field - Rectangular field."
