= Region of Durham Paramedic Services =

Region of Durham Paramedic Service
- Established: 2000
- Headquarters: Whitby, Ontario, Canada
- Jurisdiction: Regional municipality
- Employees: 315
- BLS or ALS: Both ALS and BLS
- Ambulances: 41 and 11 other support vehicles
- Chief: Troy Cheseboro
- Responses: 96457 (2011)
- Website: durham.ca

Region of Durham Paramedic Service provides emergency medical services to Durham Region in Ontario, Canada.

The service has 315 paramedics in twelve response stations throughout the region. The service began in 2000 and replaced six different contractors to the Ontario Ministry of Health.

== Operations ==
There are 12 paramedic response stations located across Durham Region:

- Whitby Paramedic Station & Headquarters - 4040 Anderson Street
- Oshawa (North) Paramedic Station - 1260 Wilson Rd. N.
- Oshawa (South) Paramedic Station - 497 Bloor Street East
- Courtice Paramedic Station - 2701 Courtice Road
- Bowmanville Paramedic Station - 9 St. George Street South
- Beaverton Paramedic Station - 343 Bay Street, PO Box 59
- Ajax Paramedic Station - 175 Hunt Street
- Pickering Paramedic Station - 1103 Kingston Road
- Uxbridge Paramedic Station - 4 Campbell Drive moved Uxbridge Fire Station 301 Brock St W, Uxbridge, ON L9P 0A4
- Port Perry Paramedic Station - 1775 Reach Street
- Sunderland Paramedic Station - S1050 Durham Regional Rd 10
- Seaton RDPS Training Center 1890 5th Concession Rd, Pickering, ON L0H 1J0
- Enniskillen RDPS Community Paramedicine 2354 Concession Rd 8, Clarington, ON L1C 5X4 Fire Station

== Fleet ==
- 41 Type III Ambulances - Ford E-Series 26 front line and 15 spare
- 7 rapid response vehicles - Chevrolet Tahoe SUV
- 1 emergency response and command unit - Chevy Tahoe SUV
- 1 logistics van - Chevy Express
- 1 emergency support unit Dodge Ram Van
- 3 administrative support units
- 3 Command Vehicles staffed by Superintendents (either ACP or PCP status)
- 1 Ford F350 for the supervisor of community paramedics

== See also ==
Paramedicine in Canada

- List of EMS Services in Ontario
- Paramedics in Canada
- Emergency Medical Services in Canada

Emergency Services in Durham Region

- Durham Regional Police Service
- Fire Services in Durham Region
- PARA-Marine Search and Rescue
