= Ontario Regiment =

Ontario Regiment (RCAC)
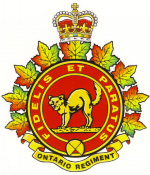
- Badge of the regiment
- Active: 14 September 1866–present
- Country: Province of Canada (1866–1867); Canada (1867–present)
- Branch: Army (Reserve)
- Type: Armoured
- Role: Cavalry
- Size: One regiment
- Part of: Royal Canadian Armoured Corps
- Garrison/HQ: 53 Simcoe Street North, Oshawa, Ontario
- Nicknames: Ontarios, ONTR
- Mottos: Fidelis et paratus (Latin for 'faithful and prepared')
- March: Dismounted: "John Peel"; Mounted: "My Boy Willie"
- Anniversaries: 14 September 1866 – Regimental Birthday; 1 March - Saint David's Day
- Engagements: First World War; Second World War; War in Afghanistan
- Battle honours: See #Battle honours

Commanders
- Commanding officer: LCol Christian Caron, CD
- Regimental sergeant major: CWO Riley Falls, CD
- Abbreviation: ONT R

Insignia
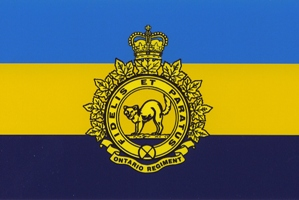
- Camp Flag

- NATO Map Symbol

The Ontario Regiment (RCAC) is a Primary Reserve armoured reconnaissance regiment of the Canadian Army. The unit is based in downtown Oshawa, Ontario, and is named after Ontario County (1852–1974). Formed in 1866, and more commonly known as the 'Ontarios', 'black cats' or 'ONT R' (pronounced "ON-tar"), the regiment ranks among the oldest continuously serving Reserve (Militia) regiments in Canada and is one of the senior armoured regiments in the Royal Canadian Armoured Corps (RCAC).

== Lineage ==
=== The Ontario Regiment (RCAC) ===
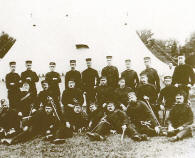
Officers of the 34th (Ontario) Battalion of Infantry at Camp Niagara, 1892

- Originated 14 September 1866 in Whitby, Canada West, as the 34th "Ontario Battalion of Infantry"
- Redesignated 8 May 1900 as the 34th Ontario Regiment
- Redesignated 1 May 1920 as The Ontario Regiment
- Redesignated 15 December 1936 as The Ontario Regiment (Tank)
- Redesignated 13 August 1940 as the 2nd Regiment, The Ontario Regiment (Tank)
- Converted 1 April 1941 to armour and redesignated as the 11th (Reserve) Army Tank Battalion, (The Ontario Regiment (Tank))
- Redesignated 15 August 1942 as the 11th (Reserve) Army Tank Regiment (Ontario Regiment (Tank))
- Redesignated 1 April 1946 as the 11th Armoured Regiment (Ontario Regiment), RCAC
- Redesignated 4 February 1949 as The Ontario Regiment (11th Armoured Regiment)
- Redesignated 19 May 1958 as The Ontario Regiment (RCAC)

== Perpetuations ==
=== Great War perpetuations ===
- 116th Battalion (Ontario County), CEF
- 182nd Battalion (Ontario County), CEF

== History ==
=== Great War ===
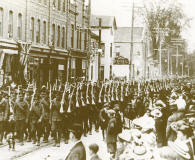
The 116th Battalion (Ontario Regiment) marches through Oshawa, May 1916

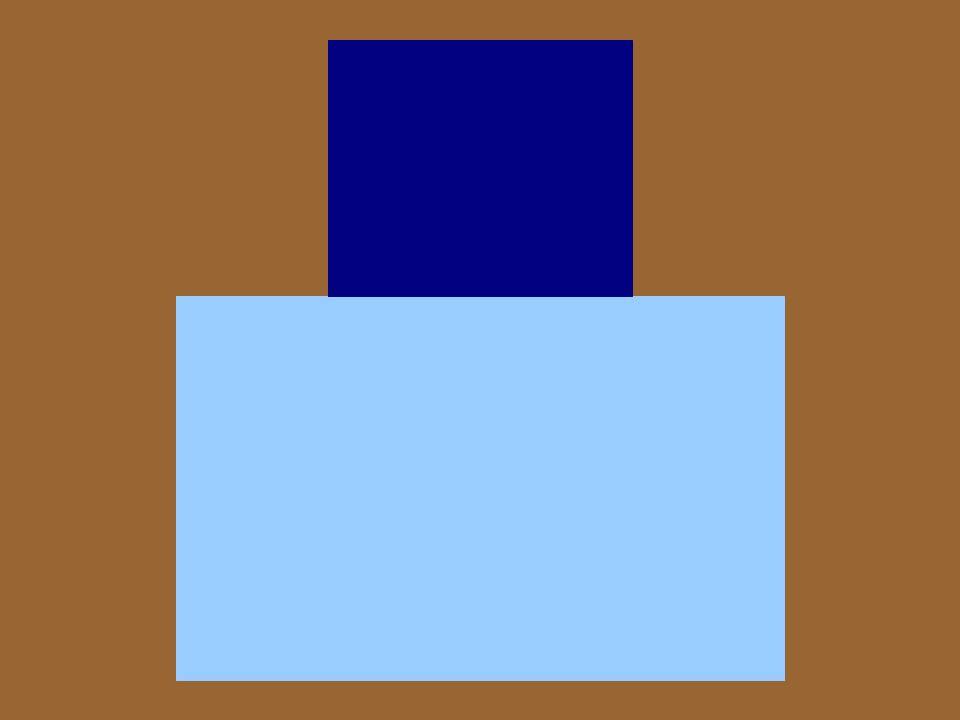
The distinguishing patch of the 116th Battalion (Ontario County), CEF.

The 116th Battalion (Ontario County), CEF was authorized on 22 December 1915 and embarked for Britain on 24 July 1916. From October to December 1916 it provided reinforcements for the Canadian Corps in the field, and on 11 February 1917 it disembarked in France, where it fought with the 9th Infantry Brigade, 3rd Canadian Division in France and Flanders until the end of the war. The battalion was disbanded on 30 August 1920.

The 182nd Battalion (Ontario County), CEF was authorized on 15 July 1916 and embarked for Britain on 3 May 1917, where its personnel were absorbed by the 18th Reserve Battalion, CEF on 16 May 1917 to provide reinforcements for the Canadian Corps in the field. The battalion was disbanded on 1 September 1917.

=== Second World War ===
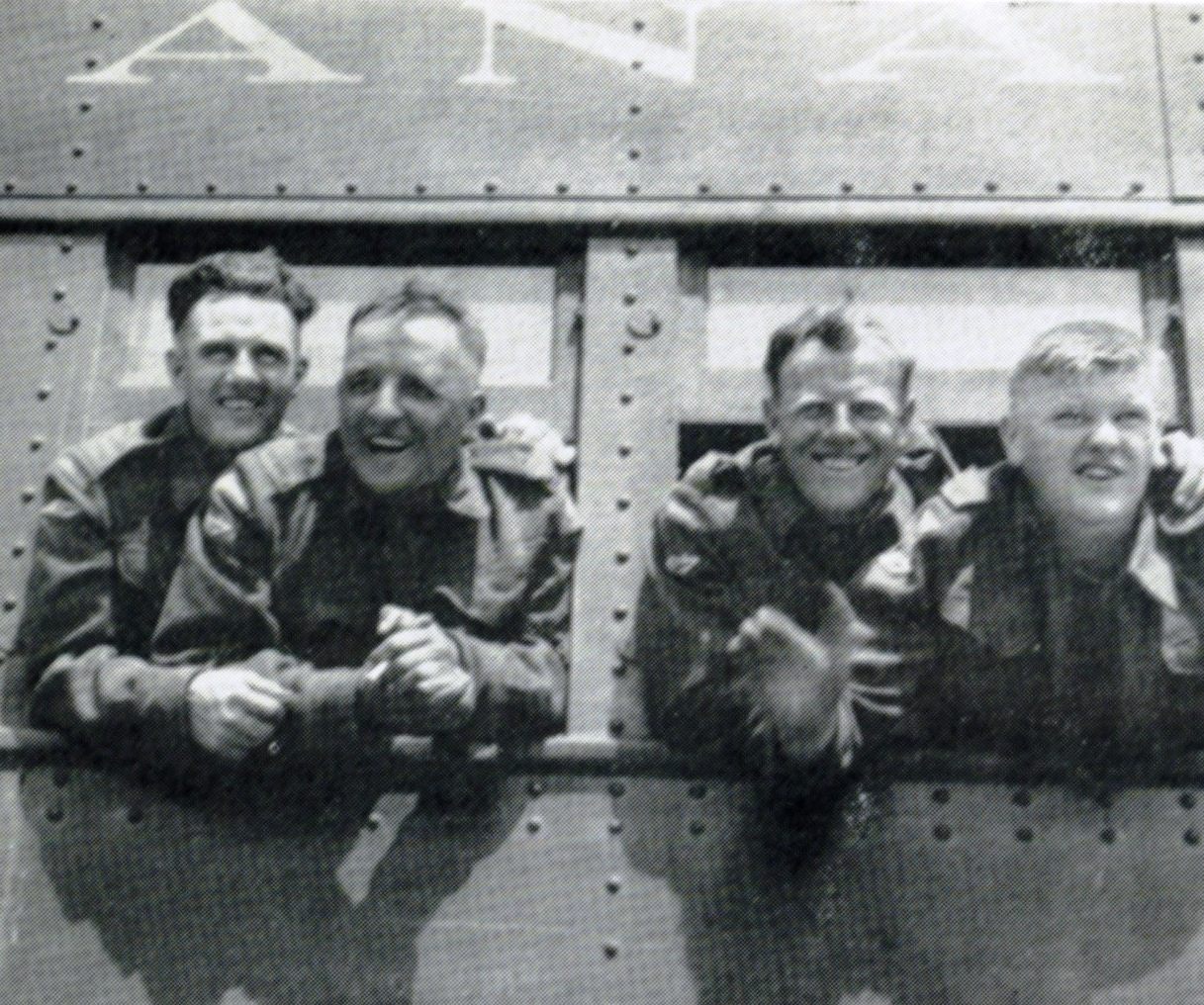
Soldiers of The Ontario Regiment entrain from Camp Borden travelling to Halifax and England

The regiment mobilized The Ontario Regiment (Tank), CASF, on 1 September 1939. It was redesignated as The Ontario Regiment (Tank), CASF, on 13 August 1940. It was converted to armour on 23 November 1940, and an army tank battalion on 11 February 1941, under the designation 11th Army Tank Battalion (The Ontario Regiment (Tank)), CAC, CASF. It was redesignated the 11th Army Tank Regiment (The Ontario Regiment (Tank)), CAC, CASF, on 15 May 1942 and the 11th Armoured Regiment (The Ontario Regiment), CAC, CASF, on 26 August 1943 and the 11th Armoured Regiment (The Ontario Regiment), RCAC, CASF, on 2 August 1945. On 21 June 1941 it embarked for Britain. The regiment landed in Sicily on 13 July 1943, as part of the 1st Canadian Armoured Brigade, and in Italy on 3 September 1943 in support of 17th Brigade, 5th British Division. On 8 March 1945 the regiment moved with the I Canadian Corps to North-West Europe as part of Operation Goldflake, where it fought until the end of the war. The overseas regiment was disbanded on 15 December 1945.

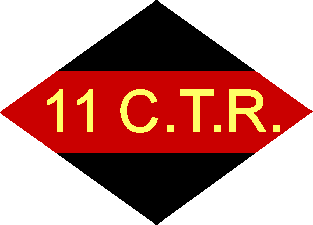
The unit patch of the 11th Canadian Army Tank Regiment during WWII.

Within six days of mobilization, 594 men had enlisted for active service. In June 1941, the regiment sailed from Halifax on the Pasteur, arriving in Greenock, Scotland, on 1 July, and headed south to Headley Down, England. The Ontarios were the first Canadians to be issued the Churchill tank, with which it trained in exercises in its experimental period of 1941–1942. On 21 December 1941, the regiment moved to Brighton, alternating between there and Shermanbury park in operational roles in the defence of the English coast. The unit fought with distinction in several theatres during the war, beginning with the Allied invasion of Sicily in July 1943, through the Italian Campaign seeing action in the fierce Liri Valley, Monte Cassino, and on to Ortona. In 1945, the unit entered the Northwest European theatre where it fought with distinction in the Dutch Campaign winning honours at Arnhem.

=== 1945–present ===
Upon demobilization, The Ontarios continued as a reserve armoured regiment using Mark IV Sherman Tanks. In fact, the regiment was one of the last Canadian militia units to give up their Shermans in 1972. Some of these actual tanks can be seen as monuments or gate guards at [CFB Kingston] and the former Denison Armoury on Dufferin Street in Toronto.

There were two more name changes for the regiment after World War II. In 1946, the regiment was designated the 11th Armoured Regiment (Ontario Regiment) and in 1958, the regiment assumed the title by which it is known today: The Ontario Regiment (RCAC).

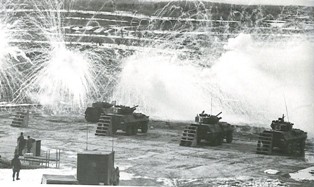
Cougars of the Ontario Regiment fire on the range at Central Militia Area Gun Camp, Meaford, 1985

The regiment's role was changed to armoured reconnaissance and the unit employed jeeps in the armoured reconnaissance vehicle in this role. In 1980, the Ontarios were re-designated an armoured regiment, this time employing the Cougar armoured vehicle. During many of the subsequent years, the regiment maintained a wheeled armoured reconnaissance squadron (later downsized to an RHQ recce troop) employing the Iltis jeep. Many of the regiment's soldiers, NCOs and officers enjoy the unique distinction among their peers in reserve armoured regiments of having been trained in both armoured and reconnaissance roles.

With the retirement of the Cougar in the 2004, the regiment was again re-designated an armoured reconnaissance unit, briefly employing and conducting trials on all terrain vehicles. Today, the regiment continues its reconnaissance tasking and has adopted the Mercedes-built LUVW G-Wagon.

A significant number of the regiment's soldiers have volunteered for active duty with NATO in Germany, United Nations missions in Cyprus, Bosnia, the Golan Heights, Cambodia, the former Yugoslavia and, most recently, the NATO-led engagement with ISAF in Afghanistan.

The Ontario Regiment exercised the Freedom of the City of Oshawa and the County of Ontario in 1966, and the Freedom of the Region of Durham in 1979.

A regimental "challenge" coin was issued in late 2009 by LCol R Brown and CWO DJ Munroe to the members and officers serving, as a remembrance of those Ontarios who have fallen in the line of duty. The coin is produced in pewter colour and shows the regimental cap badge on the front side, and the Royal Canadian Armoured Corps Cap badge on the reverse, along with a serial number. A year later, the unit's CO and RSM perceived some gaps in the official honours and awards process, particularly at the unit level. As such, in November 2010, a Command Team Coin of Excellence was presented. The coin is gold in colour and shows the regimental cap badge in full colour, ringed with the words 'For Excellence'. The reverse in gold shows the ranks of the CO and RSM, along with the flag of the Royal Canadian Armoured Corps.

A complete historical list of the unit's key appointments is maintained at the Regimental Museum's official website.

=== Lineage chart ===
Lineage chart

1858	Independent rifle and infy coys
1866	34th "Ontario Bn of Infy"
1900	34th Ontario Regt
1915	116th "Overseas" Bn, CEF
1916	182nd "Overseas" Bn, CEF
1917	Absorbed by 18th Reserve Bn
1920	Disbanded	1st Bn (116th Bn, CEF), The Ontario Regt	2nd Bn (182nd Bn, CEF), (Note: Reserve order of battle) The Ontario Regt
1936	The Ontario Regt (Tank)	Disbanded
1939	The Ontario Regt (Tank), CASF
1940	The Ontario Regt (Tank), CASF	2nd Regt, The Ontario Regt (Tank)
1941	11th Army Tank Bn (The Ontario Regt (Tank)), CAC, CASF	11th (Reserve) Army Tank Bn (The Ontario Regt (Tank))
1942	11th Army Tank Regt (The Ontario Regt (Tank)), CAC, CASF	11th (Reserve) Army Tank Regt (Ontario Regt (Tank))
1943	11th Armd Regt (The Ontario Regt), CAC, CASF
1945	11th Armd Regt (The Ontario Regt), RCAC, CASF
1945	Disbanded
1946	11th Armd Regt (Ontario Regt), RCAC
1949	The Ontario Regt (11th Armd Regt)
1958	The Ontario Regt (RCAC)

== Regimental Band ==
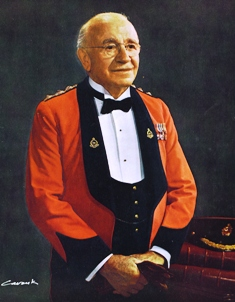
HCol RS (Sam) McLaughlin

Since 1866, the 34th Battalion and its successor units including the 116th Battalion, 182nd Battalion, and the Ontarios, maintained an award-winning brass marching band. The Regimental band earned top national honours in 1948 at the Canadian National Exhibition in Toronto. The band's patron, Colonel Robert Samuel McLaughlin (Colonel Sam), funded the purchase of the band's instruments and uniforms for several decades, having gone so far as to build a bandshell at Oshawa's Memorial Park to provide the bandsmen with their own venue to entertain Oshawa's citizens.

The Regiment maintained its band until 1968 when, due to a reorganization of the Canadian Forces, the unit's band establishment was eliminated by the federal government of the day. Lt (N) Bill Askew, a naval veteran of World War II and officer with the 1913 Ontario Regiment Cadet Corps refused to let the band wither. Under his leadership, the band was transformed into the present-day Oshawa Civic Band. Many of the former regimental bandsmen continue to play with the Civic Band today. The Civic Band regularly performs in a summer concert series at Oshawa's Memorial Park and, from to time, at military functions including the Regimental Ball (held each May) and the Regiment's annual Parkwood Promenade.

For almost forty years, the band of the 1913 Ontario Regiment Cadet Corps has provided the Regiment with much of its marching music at public events and official regimental functions.

== Allied regiment: The Royal Welsh Regiment ==
Since 1928, The Ontarios have maintained a strong friendship and alliance with its allied British regiment, the Royal Welsh (Formerly the Welch Regiment (41st of Foot) which amalgamated with the South Wales Borderers (24th of Foot) to form the Royal Regiment of Wales (RRW) in 1969.) In 2006, under a further reorganization of the British Army, the RRW was amalgamated with the Royal Welch Fusiliers (RWF) to form the Royal Welsh Regiment (RWR).

Several exchange visits have taken place over the years. In 1969, officers and men of the Ontarios performed 'groundskeeping' duties on the occasion of the Welsh’s amalgamation parade at Cardiff Castle, and Capt Russell Baird represented the Ontarios at the Investiture in Caernarvon. In September 1983, a small group of Welsh officers and soldiers were on parade in Oshawa on the occasion of the Ontarios’ change of command. In July 1989, the Ontarios sent a 35-man guard to Wales for the RRW’s Tercentenary parade at Cardiff Castle. HRH Charles, Prince of Wales the longtime colonel-in-chief of the Welsh, inspected the regiment. The Welsh reciprocated in 1991 by providing a guard for a parade at Iroquois Park in Whitby, Ontario, to mark the Ontarios’ 125th anniversary. More recently, in September 2004, the Welsh band toured many of its War of 1812 battlefields near Niagara and encampments throughout Ontario including Kingston. The band also visited Oshawa to perform at the Ontarios' annual Parkwood Promenade, held at the home of Colonel R.S. McLaughlin, the unit's former patron and long-serving honorary colonel.

The Ontario Regiment received the Freedom of the city of Oshawa and the County of Ontario in 1966 and the Freedom of the Regional Municipality of Durham in 1979.

A complete historical list of the unit's key appointments is available online at the Regimental Museum's official website.

== Battle honours ==
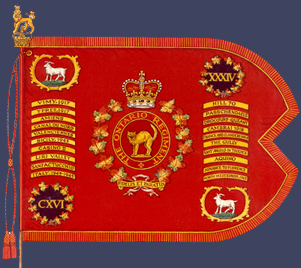
Guidon of The Ontario Regiment (RCAC), presented by Queen Elizabeth II, Ottawa, 1967

In the list below, battle honours in small capitals were awarded for participation in large operations and campaigns, while those in lowercase indicate honours granted for more specific battles. Those battle honours in bold are emblazoned on the regimental guidon.

=== First World War honours ===
- Somme, 1916
- Arras, 1917, '18
- **Vimy, 1917**
- **Hill 70**
- **Ypres, 1917**
- **Passchendaele**
- **Amiens**
- Scarpe, 1918
- **Drocourt–Quéant**
- Hindenburg Line
- **Canal du Nord**
- **Cambrai, 1918**
- **Valenciennes**
- **France and Flanders, 1916–18**

=== Second World War honours ===
- Pursuit to Messina
- **Sicily, 1943**
- Colle d'Anchise
- The Gully
- **Casa Berardi**
- Ortona
- Point 59
- **Cassino II**
- Gustav Line
- **Sant'Angelo in Teodice**
- **Liri Valley**
- **Aquino**
- Trasimene Line
- **Sanfatucchio**
- Arezzo
- **Advance to Florence**
- **Italy, 1943–1945**
- Arnhem, 1945
- **North-West Europe, 1945**

=== War in Afghanistan ===
- Afghanistan

== See also ==
- Ontario Regiment RCAC Regimental Museum

== Media ==
- The Adjutant. The 116th Battalion in France. Toronto: EPS Allen, 1921.
- Schragg, Captain Lex. History of The Ontario Regiment, 1866-1951. Oshawa: General Printers, 1952.
- Marteinson, John Kristjan & Michael R. McNorgan. The Royal Canadian Armoured Corps: An Illustrated History. Toronto: Robin Brass Studio, 2000. (French version also available)
- Barris, Ted. Victory at Vimy. Markham: Thomas Allen Publishers, 2007.

Preceded by 8th Canadian Hussars (Princess Louise's)	The Ontario Regiment (RCAC)	Succeeded by Queen's York Rangers (1st American Regiment)
