= Durham Regional Police Service =

Police agency of Durham Region, Ontario, Canada

- Motto: Leaders in Community Safety

Agency overview
- Formed: 1974

Jurisdictional structure
- Operations jurisdiction: Canada
- Constituting instrument: Community Safety and Policing Act, 2019 (SO 2019, c. 1, Sched. 1)

Operational structure
- Headquarters: Whitby, Ontario
- Sworn members: 904
- Unsworn members: 307
- Elected officer responsible: Hon. Michael Kerzner, Solicitor General of Ontario
- Agency executive: Peter Moreira, Chief of Police
- Divisions: 5

Facilities
- Police cars: 398
- Police boats: 2
- Helicopters: 1
- Dogs: 8 police service dogs

Website
- Official website

The Durham Regional Police Service (DRPS) is the police service operated by and serving the Regional Municipality of Durham, Ontario, Canada. The DRPS has a strength of over 900 sworn officers and over 300 unsworn members, and serves the following local municipalities, with a combined population of 706,200:

- Pickering
- Oshawa
- Whitby
- Ajax
- Clarington
- Scugog
- Brock
- Uxbridge

The DRPS was formed in 1974 through the amalgamation of six local police forces in the area, coinciding with the establishment of the Regional Municipality of Durham:

- Oshawa Police
- Whitby Police
- Bowmanville Police
- Uxbridge Police
- Pickering Township Police
- Ajax Police

== Organization ==
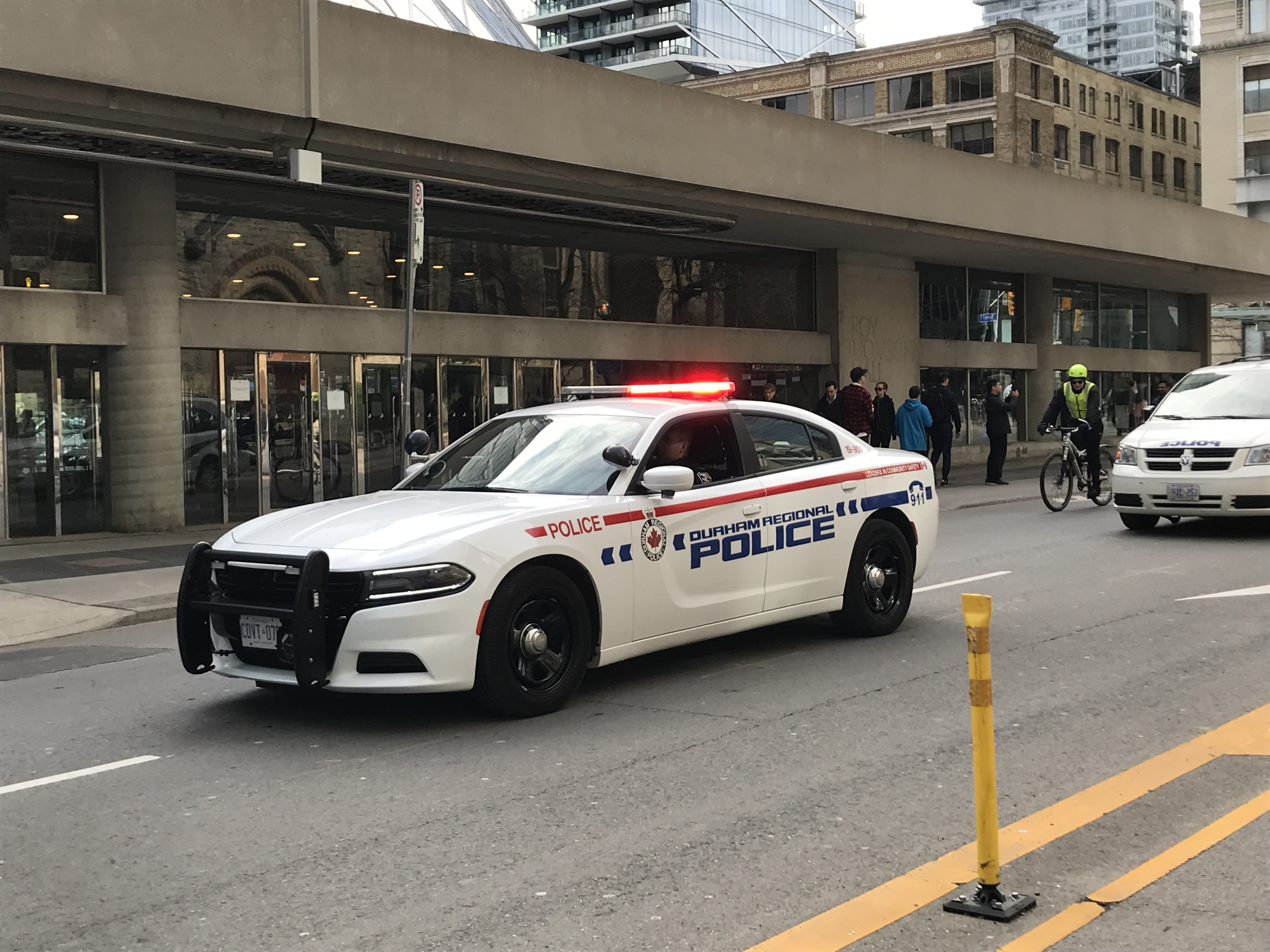
A Durham Regional Police Service Dodge Charger police car

The Durham Regional Police Service is led by:

- Chief of Police Peter Moreira
- Deputy Chief Chris Kirkpatrick (Strategic &

Operational Support Command)

- Deputy Chief Dean Bertrim (Serious & Organized

Crime Command)

- Deputy Chief Kim Yeandle (Public Safety Command)
- Chief Administrative Officer Stan MacLellan

Durham Regional Police Headquarters is in Whitby, Ontario at the Regional Municipality of Durham Headquarters building. Budgeted expenditures for DRPS in Durham Region's 2020 budget were $241.4 million

In October 2008, the Durham Regional Police Service was named one of "Canada's Top 100 Employers" by Mediacorp Canada Inc. and was featured in Maclean's newsmagazine. Later that month, it was also named one of Greater Toronto's Top Employers, which was announced by the Toronto Star newspaper.

Durham Regional Police is a member of OALEP.

In late May 2019, after a request by the Ministry of the Solicitor General (Ontario), the Ontario Civilian Police Commission issued an order that appointed a retired Toronto deputy chief, Mike Federico, as administrator to oversee the force during the OCPC investigation after some of the senior ranks were alleged to have been corrupt and of an abuse of power. As of May 24, 2019, none of the allegations had been proven. Federico’s responsibilities were to include "approving promotions and overseeing all internal discipline". The allegations were first brought to light in an April 19 report in the Toronto Star; at the time, a lawyer representing Chief Paul Martin said the allegations are "false and defamatory". Martin announced on 9 July 2020 that he would be retiring from the Service effective September 2020.

=== Police senior officers ===
The day-to-day and regional operations are commanded by senior officers:

- Deputy Chief
- Superintendent
- Inspector
- Civilian directors and managers

=== Police officers ===
- Detective / Staff Sergeant
- Detective / Sergeant
- Detective Constable
- Senior Constable
- Constable - 1st class
- Constable - 2nd class
- Constable - 3rd class
- Constable - 4th class
- Special Constables

== Operational support units ==
In 2014, the Durham Regional Police Service had an authorized strength of 871 sworn members and 331 civilians.

Some of the units within the force are:

- Air support unit
- Auxiliary unit (auxiliary constable)
- Canine unit
- Case management unit
- Central cellblock unit
- Communications-911 unit
- Community services unit
- Corporate communications unit
- Courts unit
- Crime analysis unit
- Diversity unit
- Domestic violence investigative unit
- Drug enforcement unit
- E-crimes unit
- Emergency measures/labour liaison unit
- Explosive disposal unit
- Facilities management unit
- Financial services unit
- Firearms unit
- Fleet services unit
- Forensic identification unit
- Fraud unit
- Freedom of information unit
- Gun and gang unit
- General occurrence auditing unit
- Health, wellness and safety unit
- Homicide unit
- Hostage negotiators
- Human resources unit
- Information technology unit
- Legal services unit
- Marine unit
- Major incident command
- Mental health unit
- Offender management unit
- Patrol support unit
- Polygraph unit
- Prisoner transport unit
- Professional standards unit
- Property unit
- Public order unit
- Quality assurance unit
- Regional youth unit
- Robbery unit
- Records unit
- Senior support unit
- Sexual assault and child abuse unit
- Strategic planning unit
- Surveillance unit
- Tactical support unit
- Technical services section
- Threat assessment unit
- Traffic services branch
- Victim services unit
- Volunteer unit
- Warrant liaison unit

== Policing divisions ==
The force is organized into several divisions:

- West Division - Serving Ajax and Pickering
- Central West Division - Serving Whitby and Western Oshawa
- Central East Division - Serving Oshawa
- East Division - Serving Clarington, Oshawa and Scugog
- North Division - Serving Brock, Scugog and Uxbridge

The Durham Regional Police Service is one of two Greater Toronto Area police forces with police aviation capabilities, the other being the York Regional Police. They operate one Bell 206B-3 helicopter (callsign "AIR1") and delivered in 2003. DRP Air Unit began in 2000 with a leased Bell Jet Ranger helicopter after shared a helicopter with York Regional Police for a two years pilot trial and was the Greater Toronto Region first police force to operate helicopters. An Airbus H-135 was ordered in 2024 to replace the Bell 206B in 2027.

Some vehicles bear the motto "Leaders in Community Safety".

== Tactical Support Unit ==
The Tactical Support Unit is responsible for handling dangerous situations not handled by regular uniformed officers. The Durham Regional Police TSU also has a mutual-aid agreement with the York Regional Police Emergency Response Unit. In the event of a large-scale event, or an incident that could take a significant amount of time, both departments provide assistance to one another.

== Marine unit ==
The marine unit is responsible for the enforcement of three bodies of water in the region: Lake Ontario, Lake Scugog, and Lake Simcoe. They also police the area of and around Beaverton, Thorah Island, and parts of the Trent-Severn Waterway. Members of the marine unit are specially trained for marine enforcement and rescue duties, including ice rescue. The unit is attached to the traffic enforcement unit.

The Durham Regional Police Marine Unit also has a mutual aid agreement with the Toronto Police Service for Lake Ontario as well as side-scan sonar and ROV, and with the York Regional Police for Lake Simcoe as well as side-scan sonar and diver services. In the event of a large-scale event, or a call-out that could take a significant amount of manpower, these police services provide mutual assistance to one another.

The Marine Unit consists of one officer, active during the summer months. Durham Police do not patrol the water ways during the off season and winter months.

Additional SAR support provided by PARA-Marine Search and Rescue, and COMRA Canadian Coast Guard and Canadian Forces 424 Squadron (air support from CFB Trenton).

=== Equipment ===
- a 26-foot Zodiac RHIB (2011) with two 200 hp Yamaha outboard engines - transported by trailer to Lake Scugog and Lake Simcoe
- a 34-foot Hike Metal Products patrol with two 340 hp supercharged diesel Volvo engines, search and rescue vessel (2004) - named "David J. Edwards"

== Uniform ==
The DRPS crest is used on vehicles, headgear and uniforms, and consists of St. Edward's Crown over a round blue shield with the legend "Durham Regional Police" in white, encircling a red maple leaf overlaid with gold scales of justice. The crest is based on that of the former City of Oshawa police department, with the maple leaf and scales replacing the city's coat of arms.

Officers are issued Glock .40 caliber pistols.

== See also ==
- Region of Durham Paramedic Services
- Fire Services in Durham Region
- Police brutality
